= Statuary of the West Front of Salisbury Cathedral =

This article presents the statues to be found on the Great West Front of Salisbury Cathedral, in Salisbury, England. It names all the statues and their dates of installation, sculptors where known, and the attributes and identifying features of the statues. There are photographs of the statues with an enumerated photograph to show their position on the façade.

== Statues ==
There are 79 figures on the Great West Front.

- 7 are from the 14th century, of which two were modified in the mid-18th century.
- 63 were installed between 1867 and around 1871 from the workshops of James Redfern.
- 5 were installed in the 20th century.
- 4 were installed in the 21st century.

== Display scheme ==
The overall scheme is divided into six tiers. The niche numbering system works from left to right (north to south) as viewed from the west, and from top to bottom. The four lower tiers begin on the north face of the north turret and continue around onto the south face of the south turret; only the lower two tiers have statues on the north face.

=== Tier 1: The Vesica ===
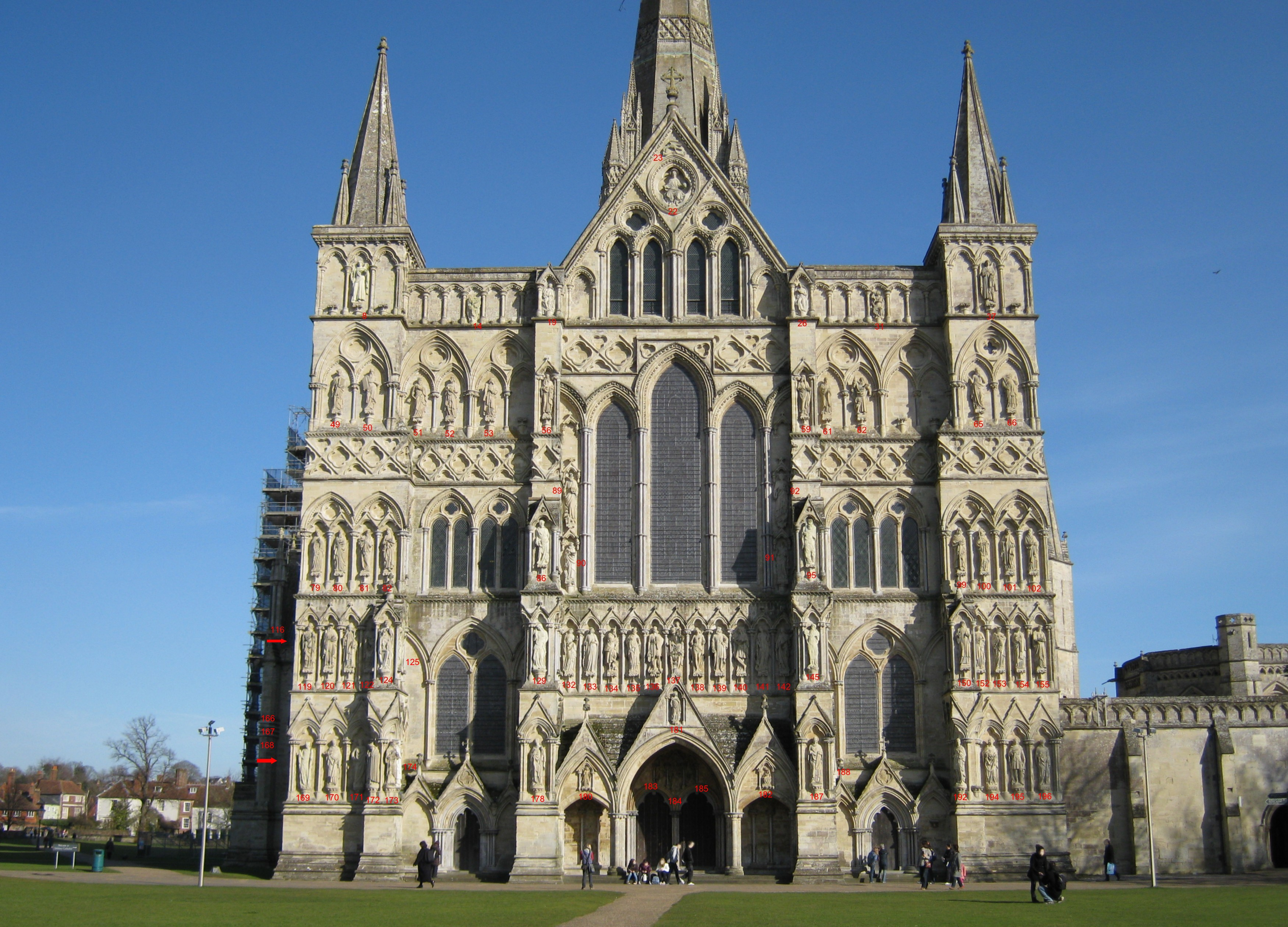
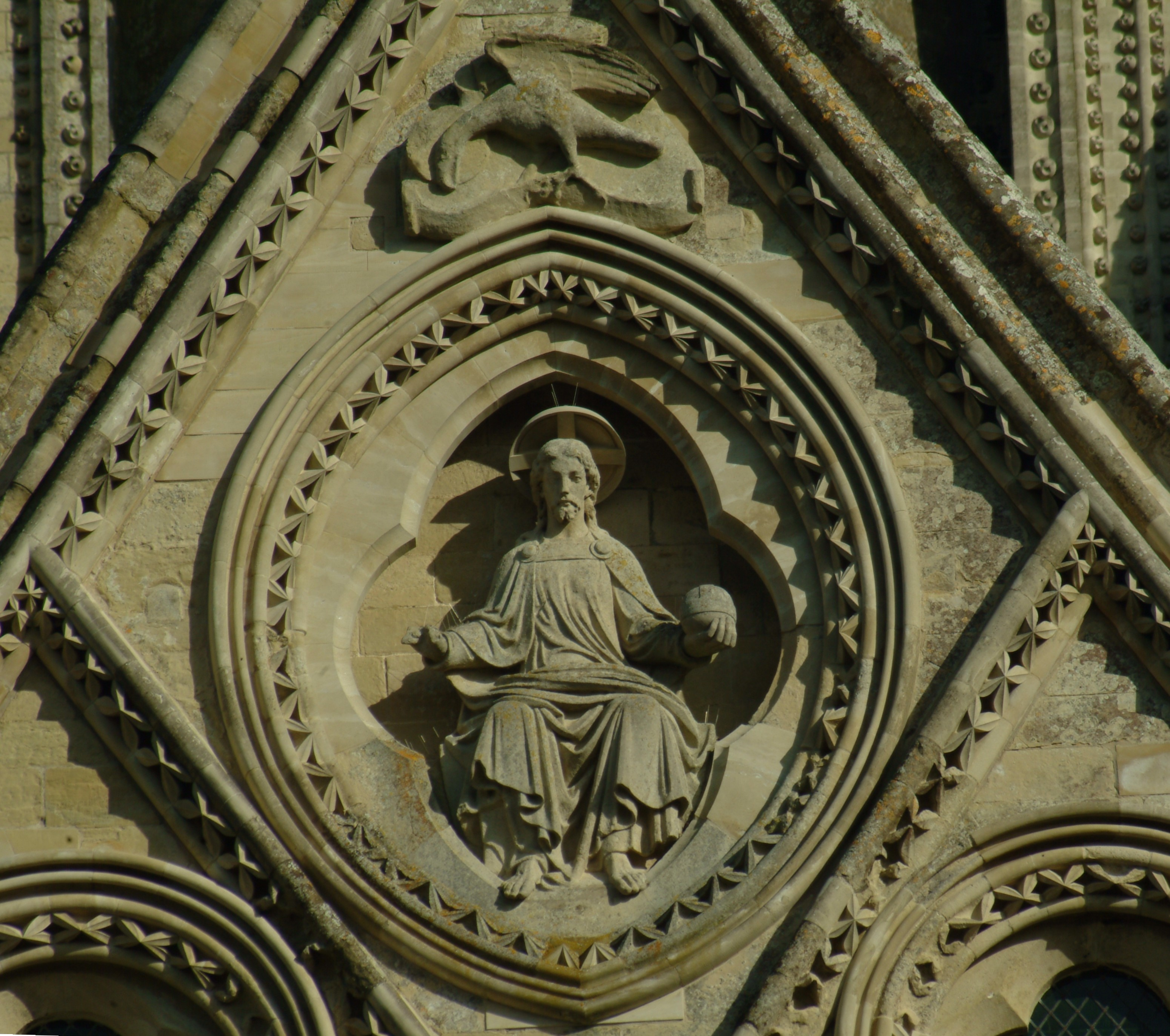
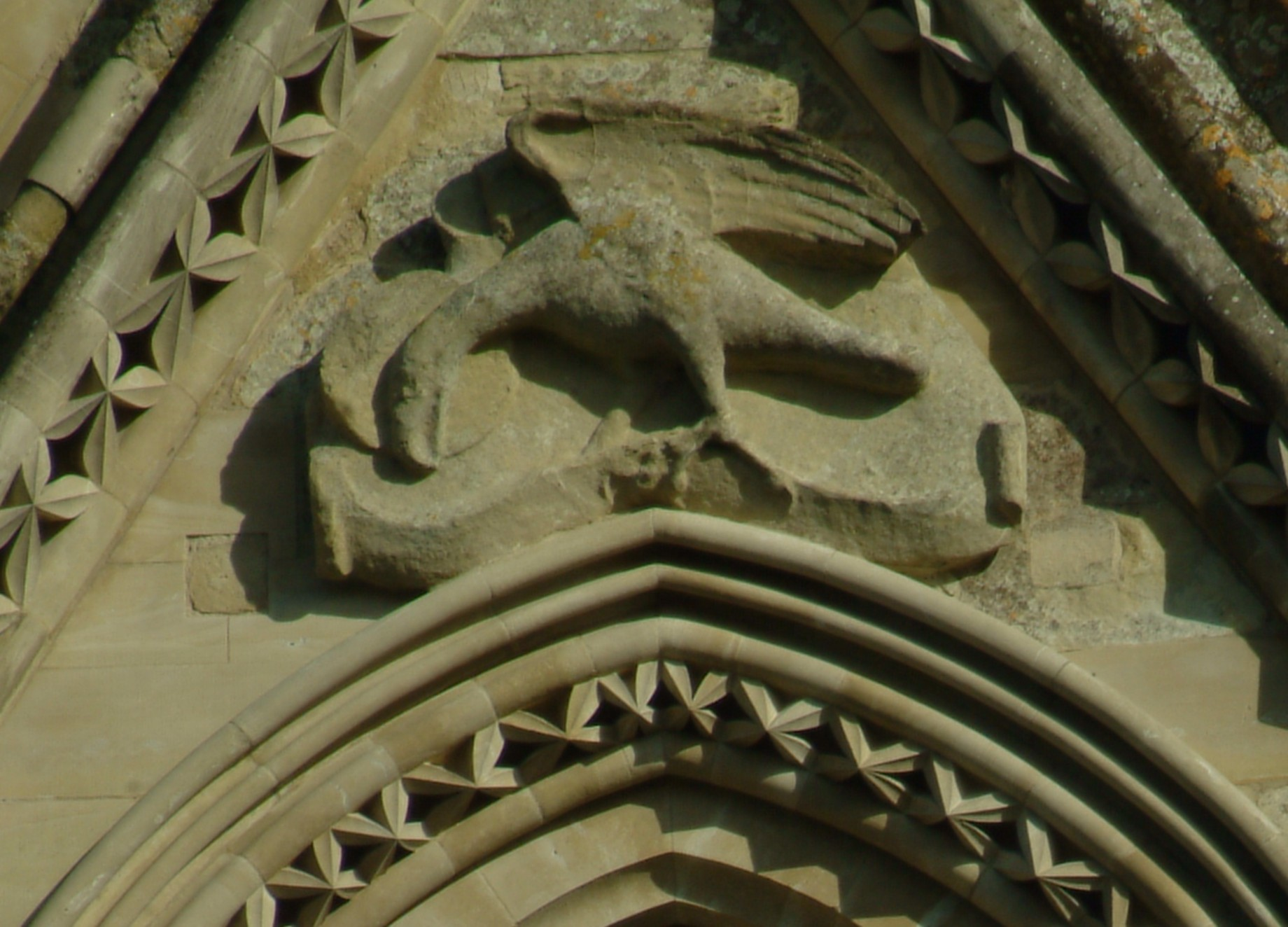
Niche No.	Statue	Date Installed	Sculptor	Attributes or identifying features	Photo West Front showing niche numbers.
8	Christ in Majesty	?1867	James Redfern	Holding an orb in the left hand. Right hand missing some fingers.	Christ in Majesty.
23	Eagle of St John	c. 14th century	Anon	Showing a nimbus and holding a phylactery.	Eagle of St John the Evangelist.

=== Tier 2: The Angels ===
8
Standing archangel
?1867
James Redfern
Holding an orb and staff.

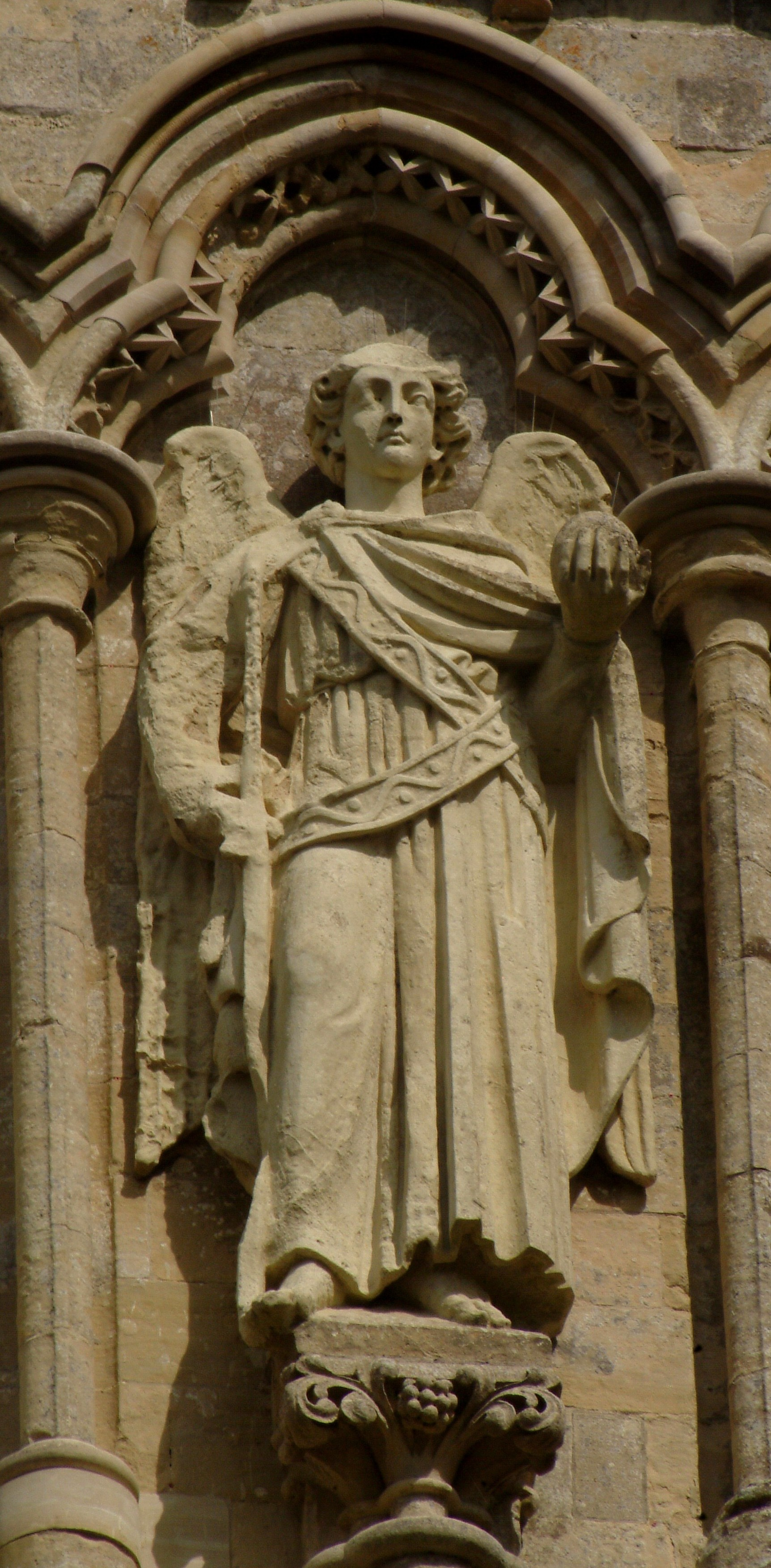
Standing Archangel in niche 8

14
Seated angel
?1867
James Redfern
Head missing, playing a harp.

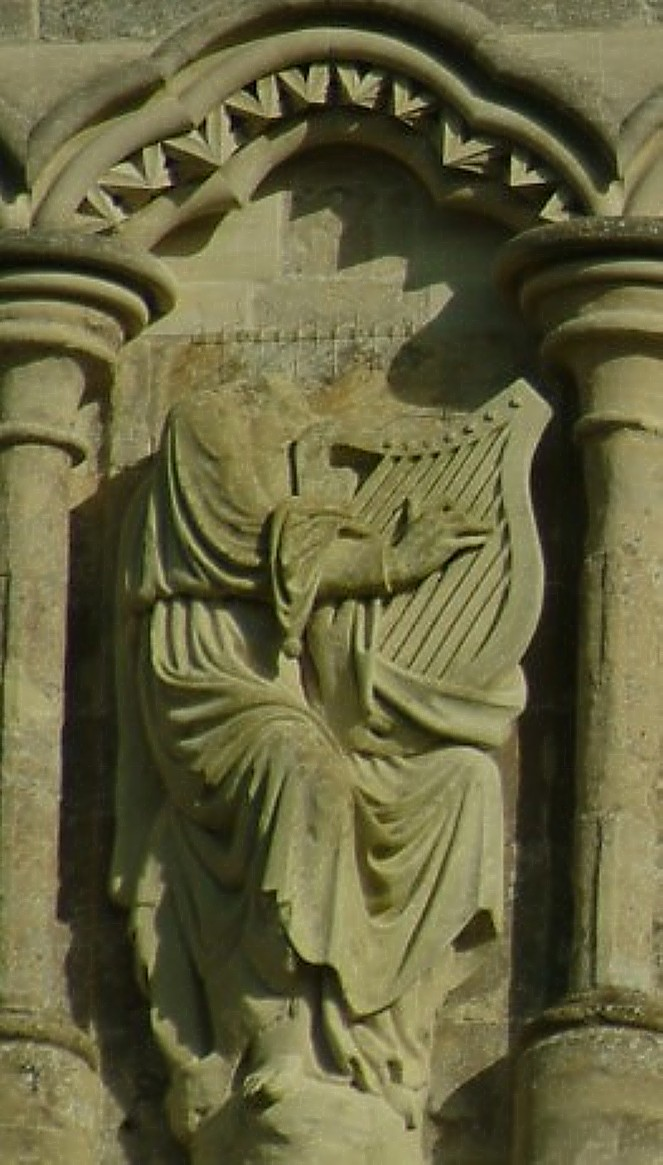
Angel in niche 14

19
Seated angel
1999
Jason Battle
Right hand raised to chest

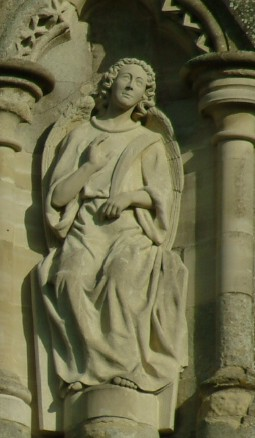
Angel in niche 19

26
Seated angel
2000
Jay Battle
Holding a crown.

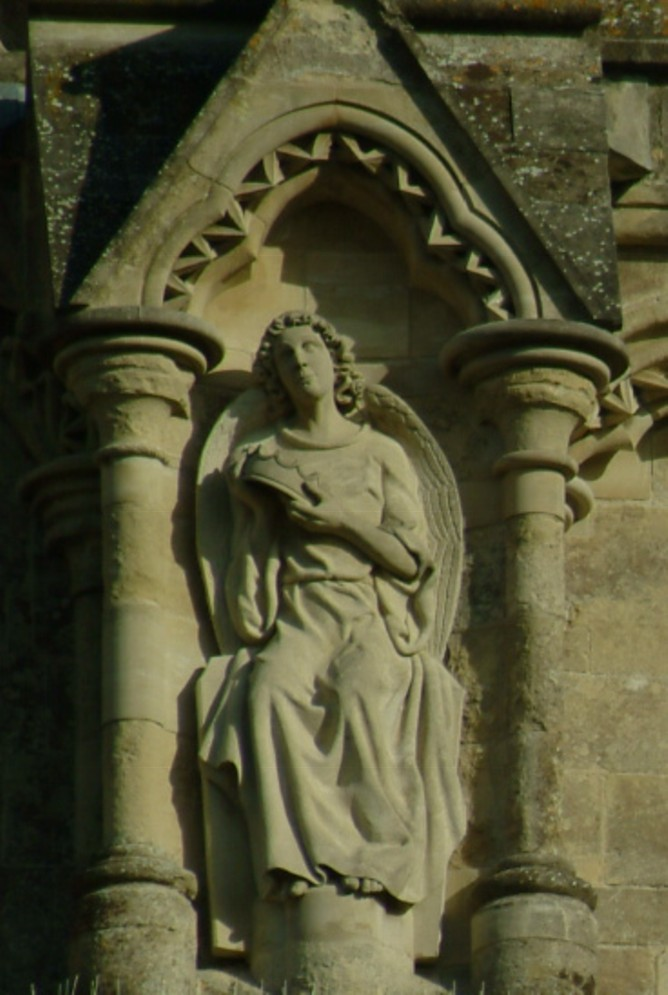
Angel in niche 26

31
Seated angel
?1867
James Redfern
Face damaged, holding an open scroll.

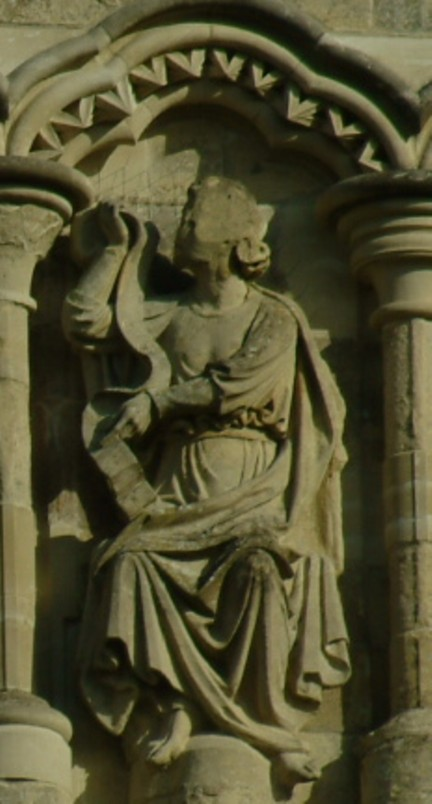
Angel in niche 31

37
Standing archangel
?1867
James Redfern
Missing right hand, orb in left hand.

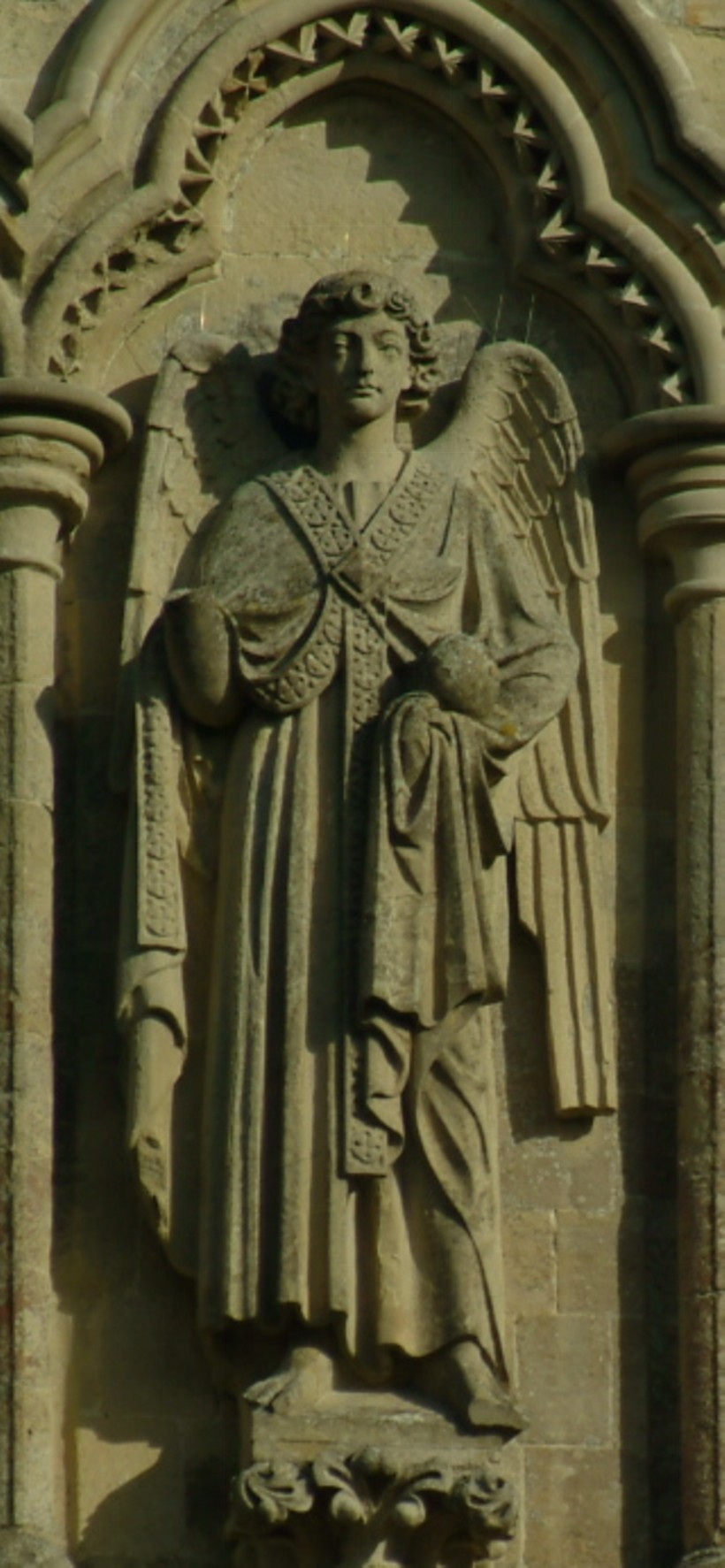
Archangel in niche 37

=== Tier 3: Old Testament Patriarchs and Prophets ===
49
King David
1869
James Redfern
Left hand supporting a harp.

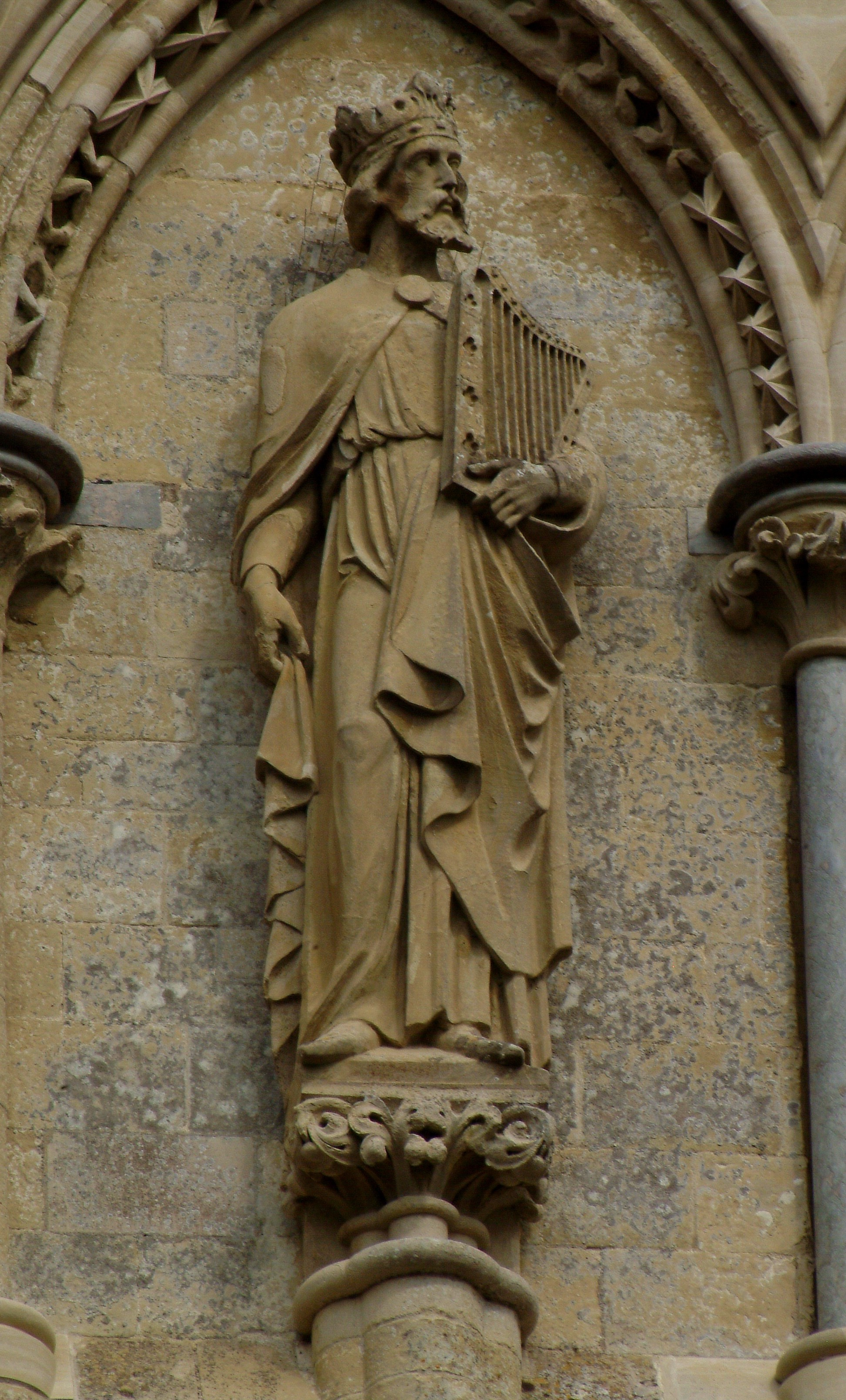
King David

50
Moses
1869
James Redfern
'Horns' of light on head, holding the Tablets of the Law.

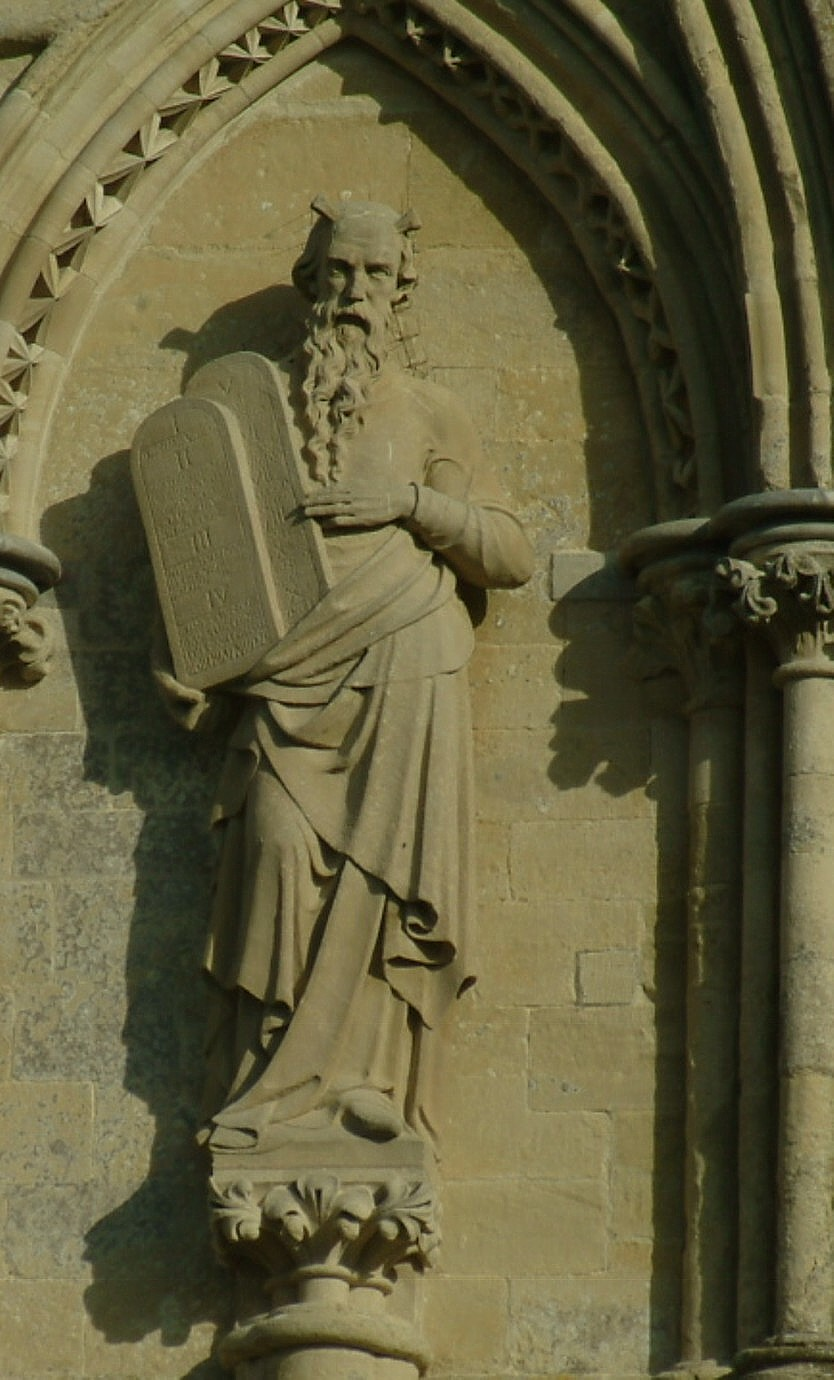
Moses

51
Isaiah
1869–70
James Redfern
Scroll in right hand, left hand across chest.

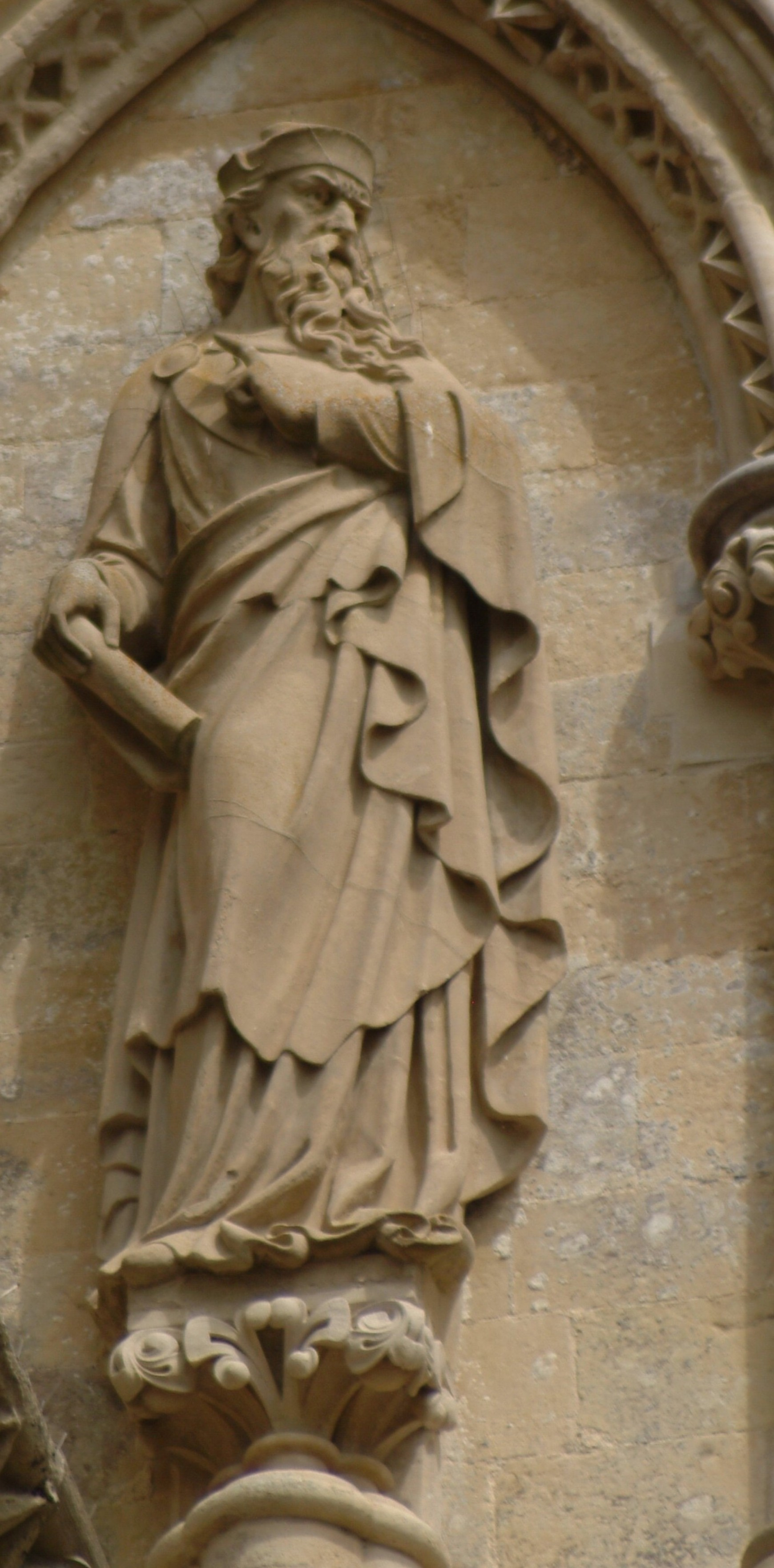
Isaiah

52
Jeremiah
1869–70
James Redfern
Scroll in left hand, right hand raised to chest.

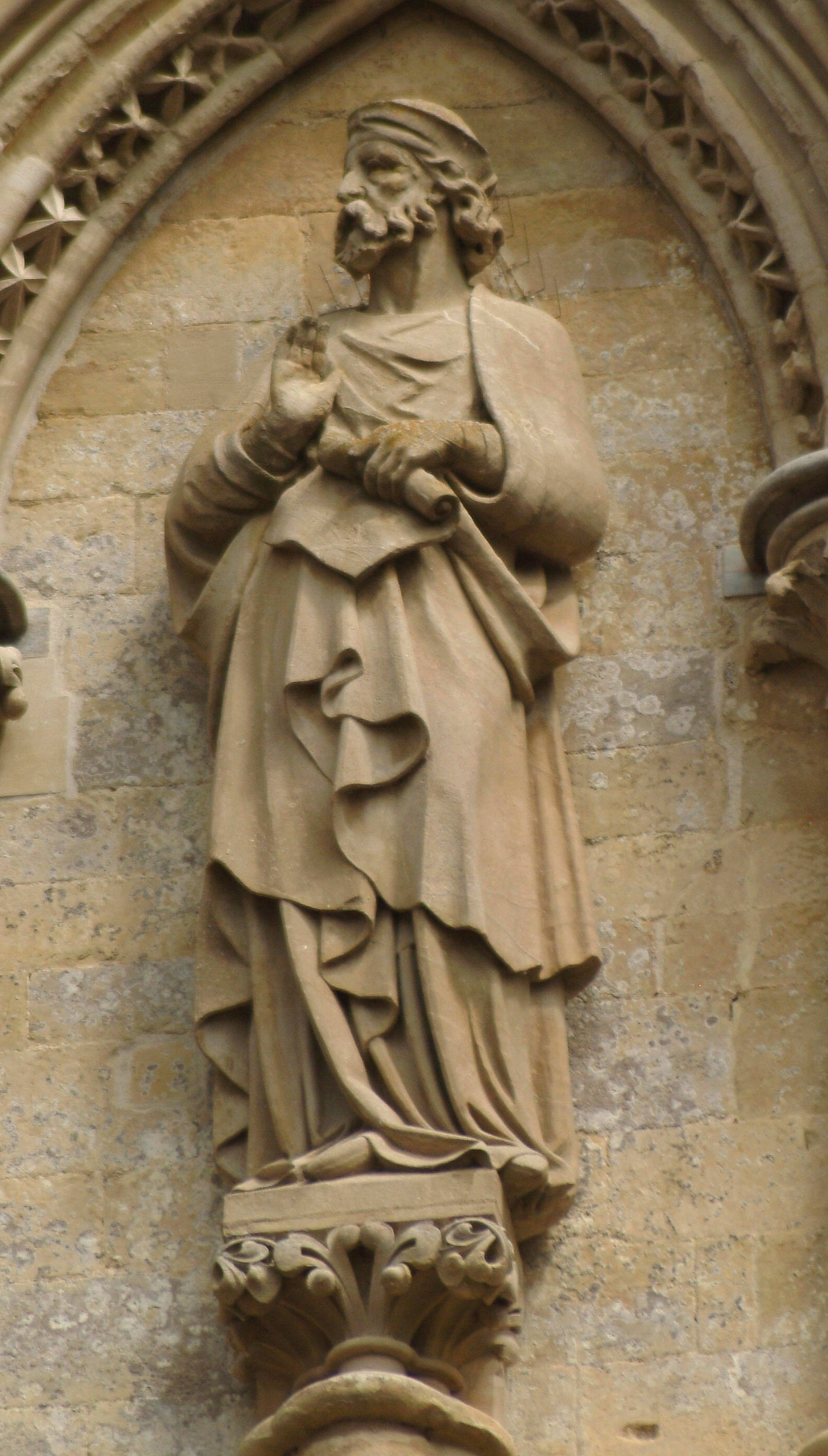
Jeremiah

53
Ezekiel
1869–70
James Redfern
Looking to left, open scroll in right hand.

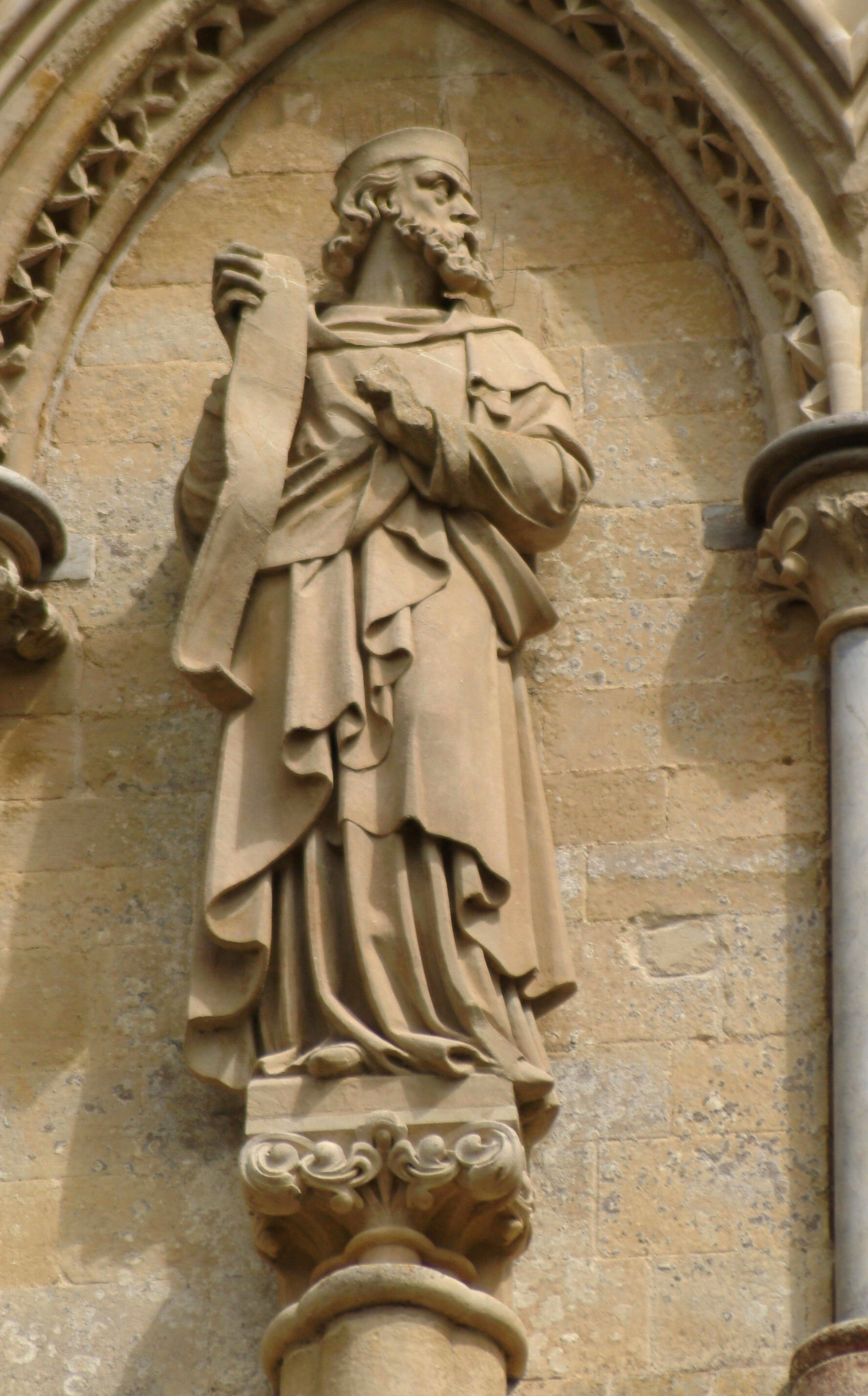
Ezekiel

56
Abraham
1867–69
James Redfern
Knife in right hand, left hand missing.

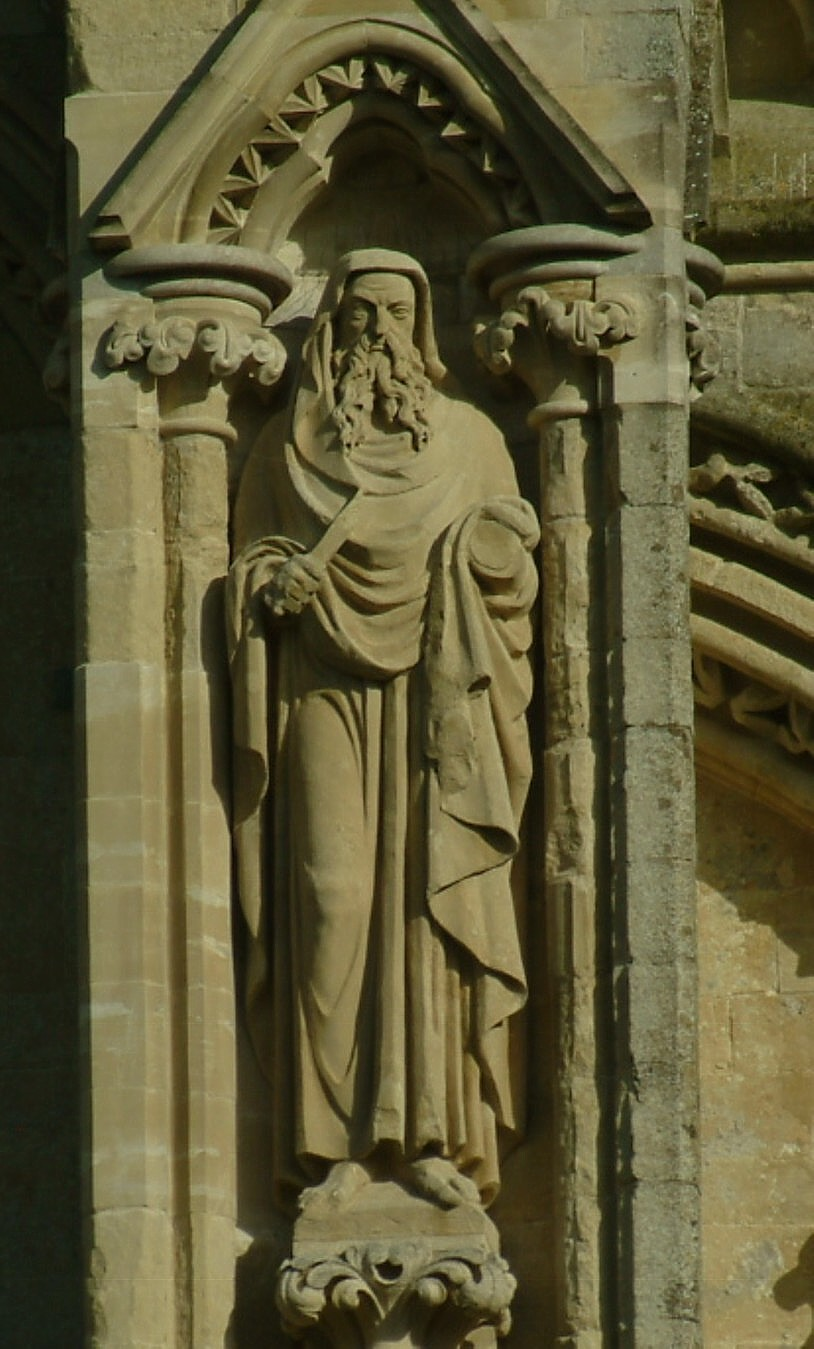
Abraham

59
Noah
1867–69
James Redfern
Holding a model Ark in left hand, right hand missing.

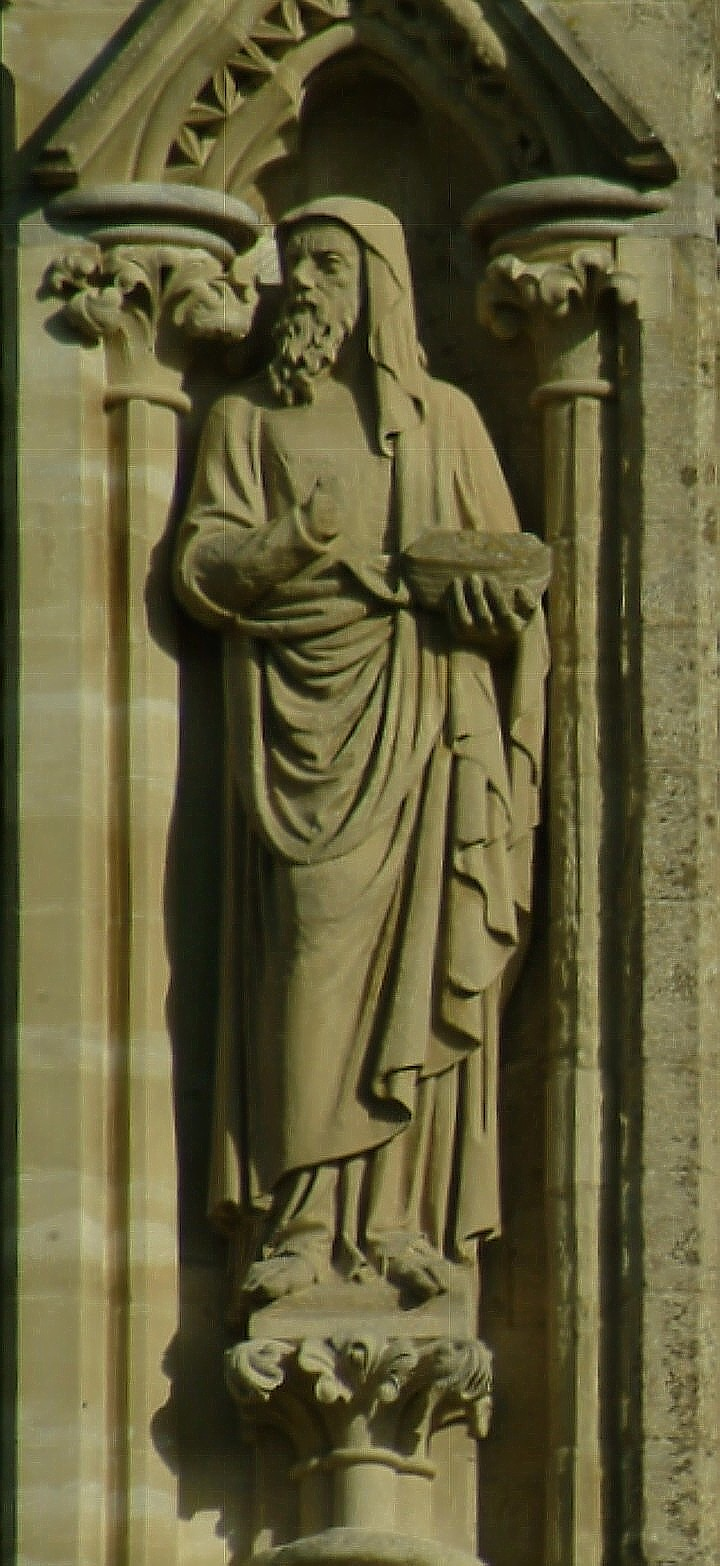
Moses

61
Job
After 1870
Anon
Open scroll in left hand showing his name.

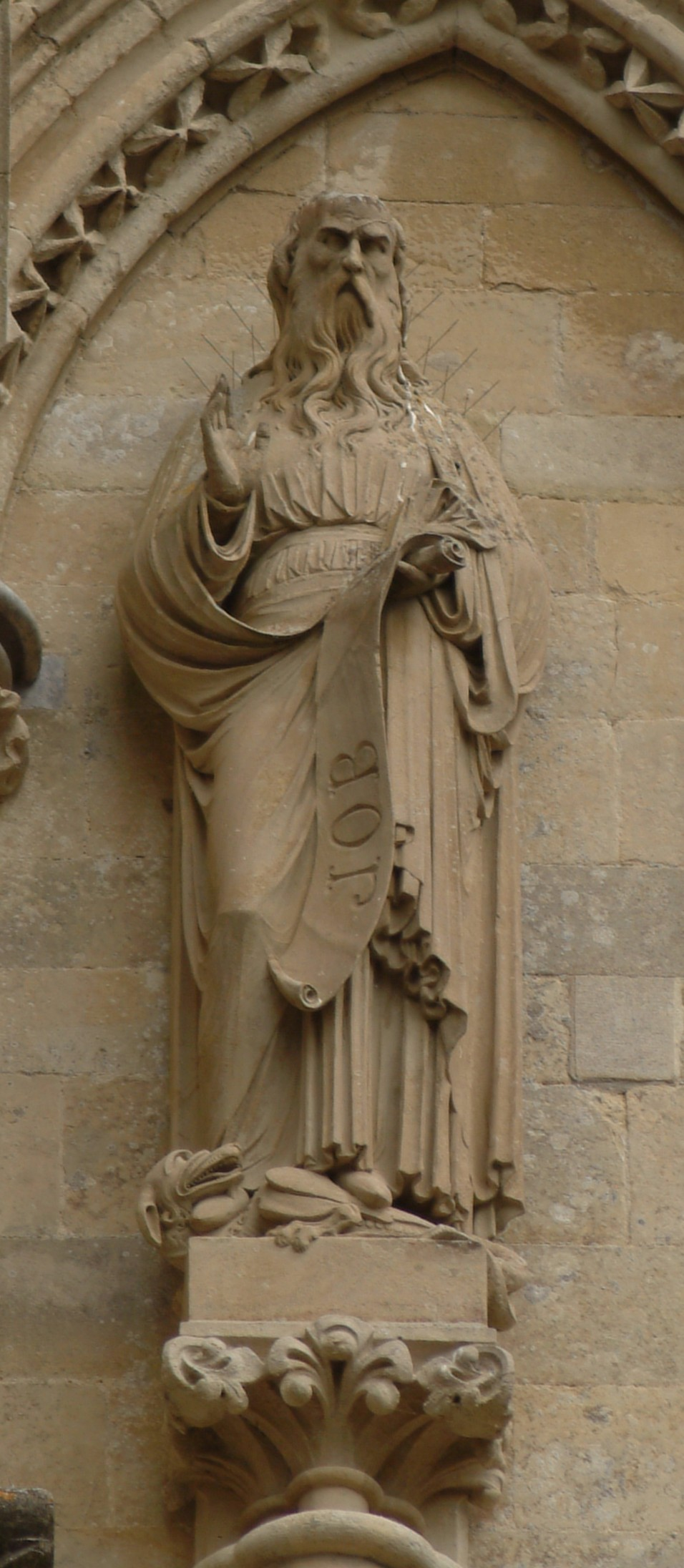
Job

62
Daniel
Early 20th century
Anon
Open book in left hand, lion at right side.

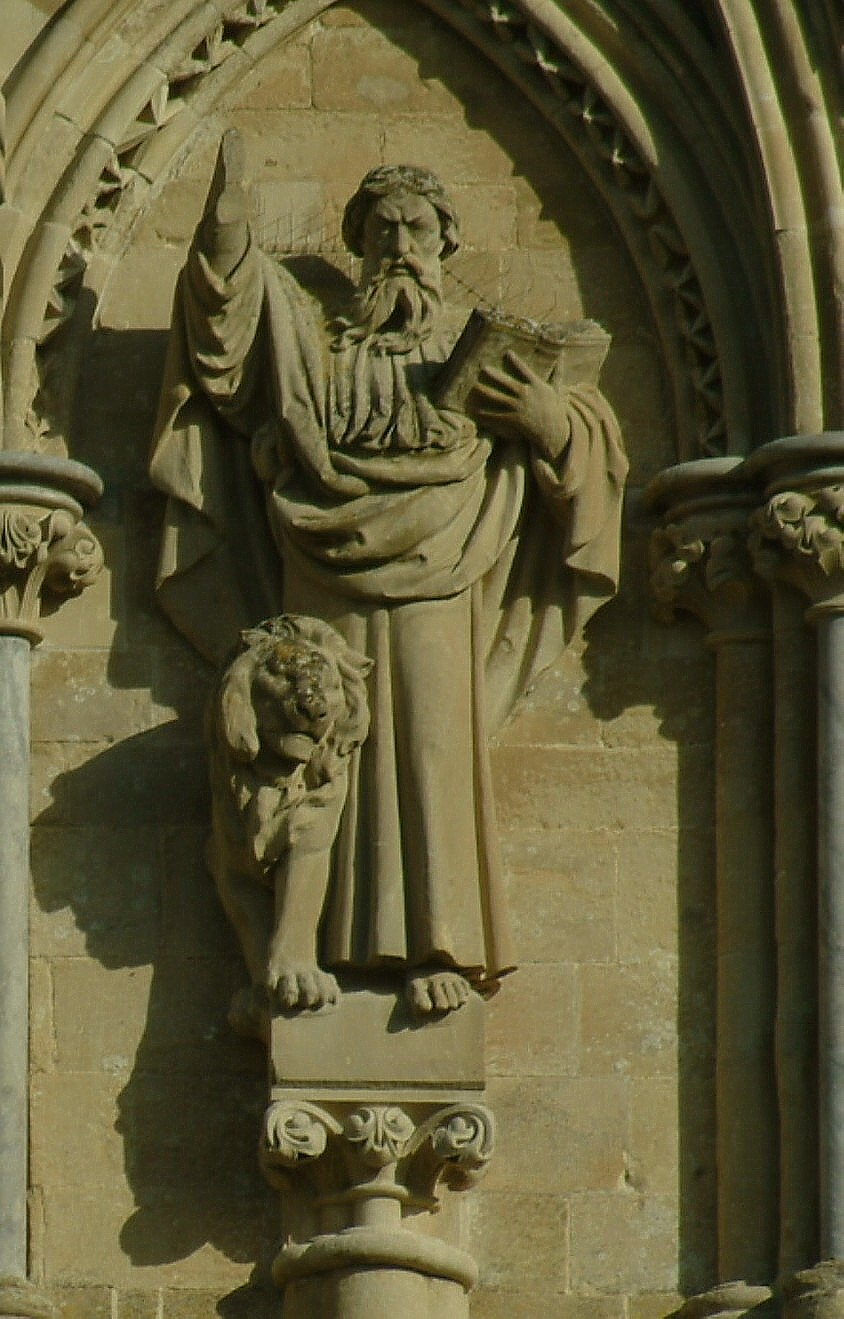
Daniel

65
Samuel
1869
James Redfern
Left hand holding beard, right hand raised.

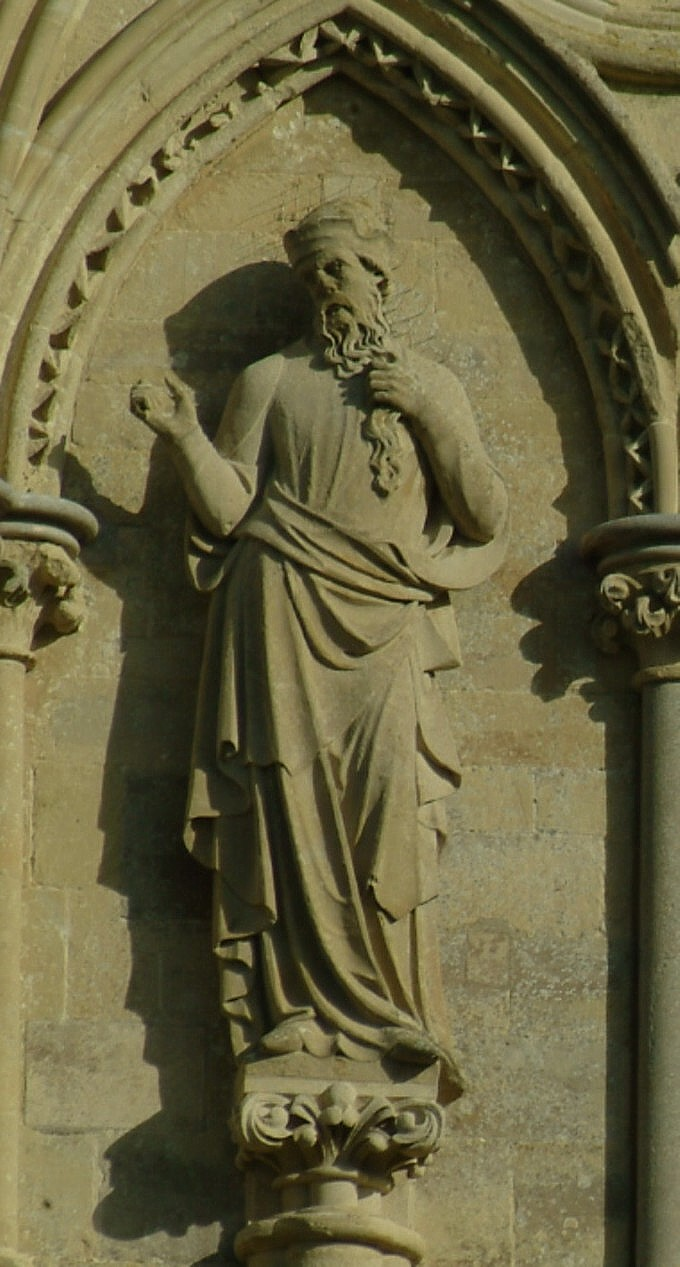
Samuel

66
King Solomon
1869
James Redfern
Head missing, sceptre in right hand, bag hanging from belt.

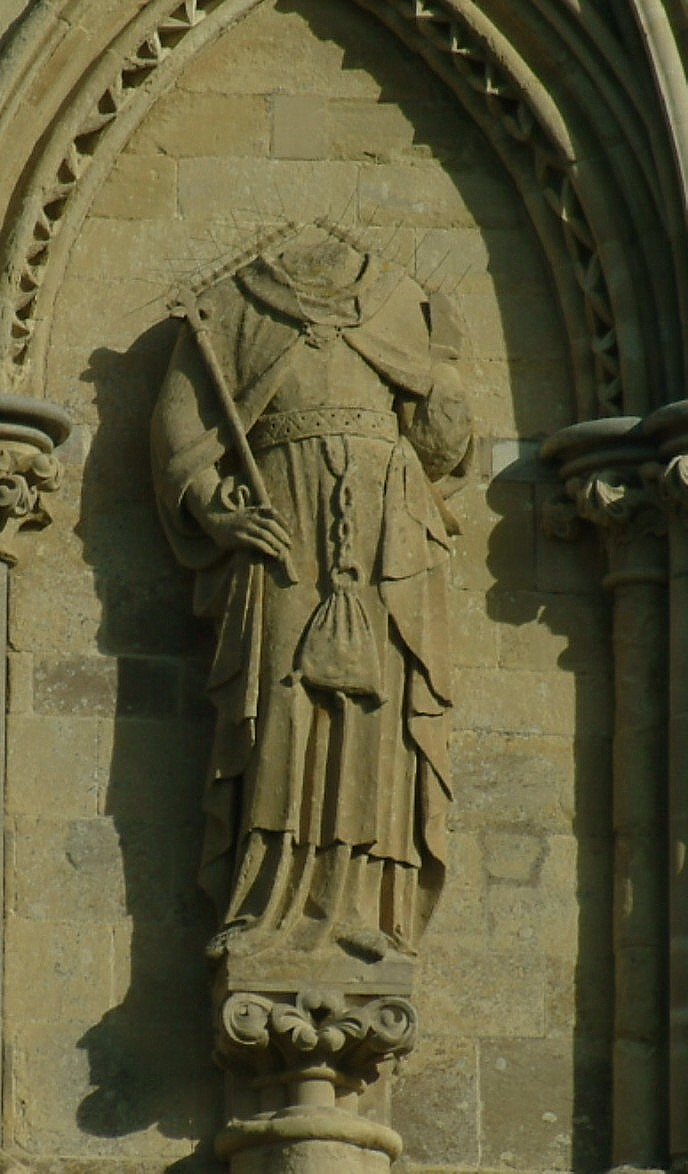
King Solomon

=== Tier 4: Apostles ===
79
St Jude
1867–69
James Redfern
Hands together at chest, halberd leaning against body.

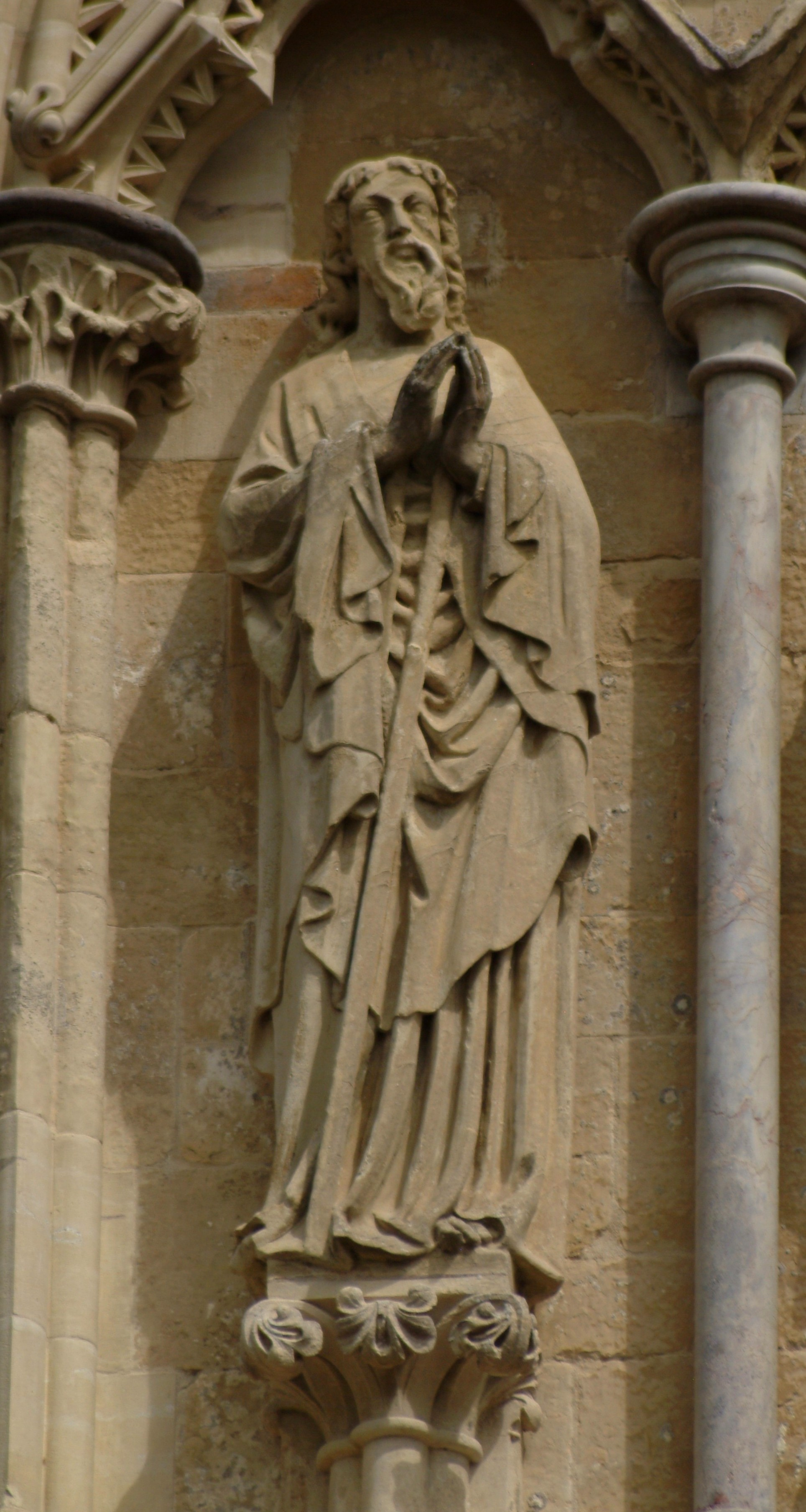
St Jude

80
St Simon
1867–69
James Redfern
Holding a long saw.

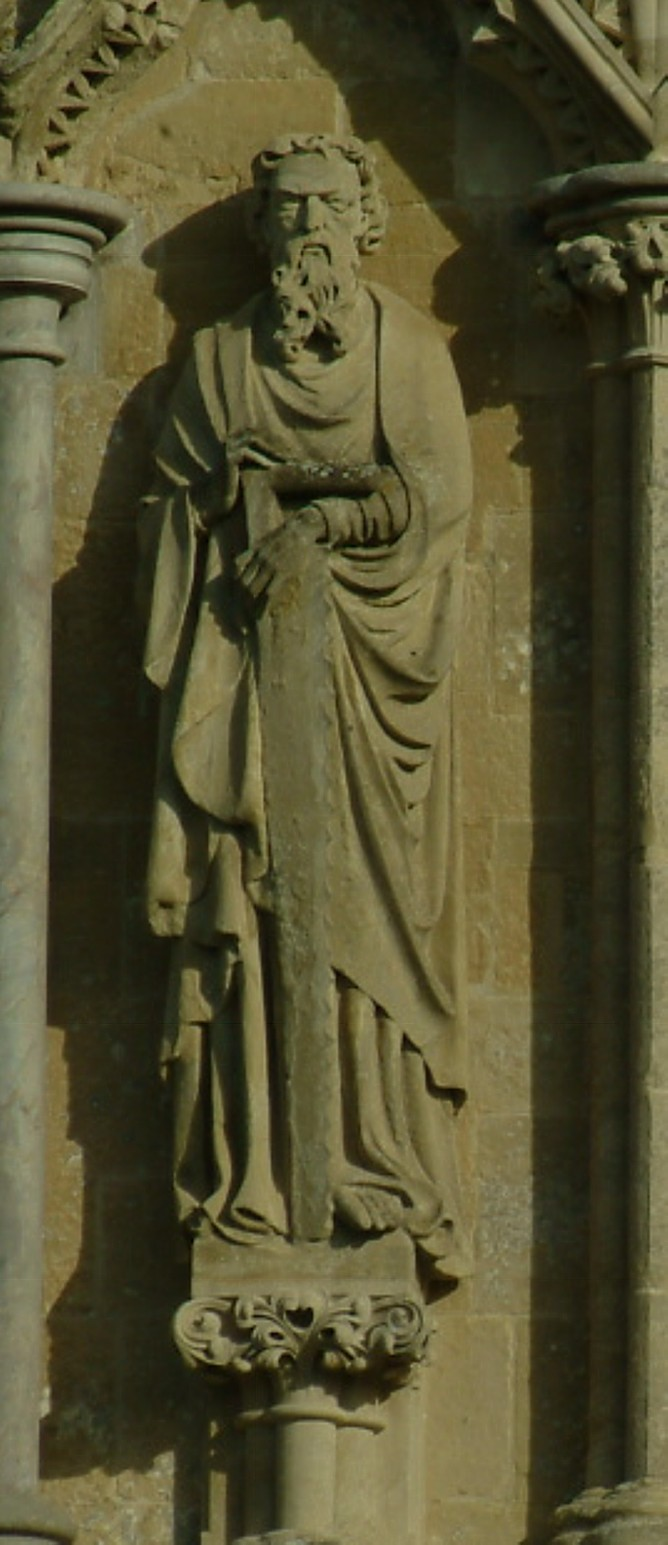
St. Simon

81
St Andrew
1867–69
James Redfern
Holding a small saltire cross

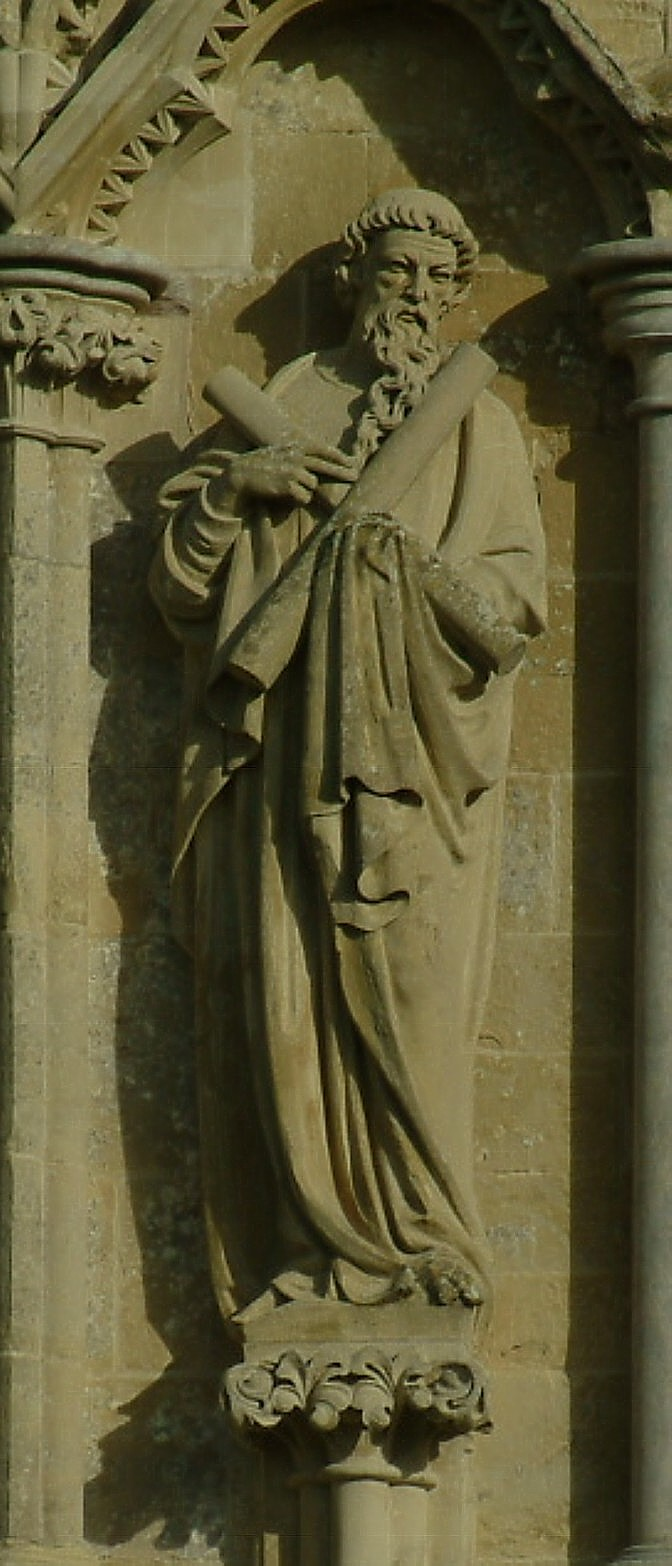
St. Andrew

82
St Thomas
1867–69
James Redfern
Both hands across chest holding a builder's square.

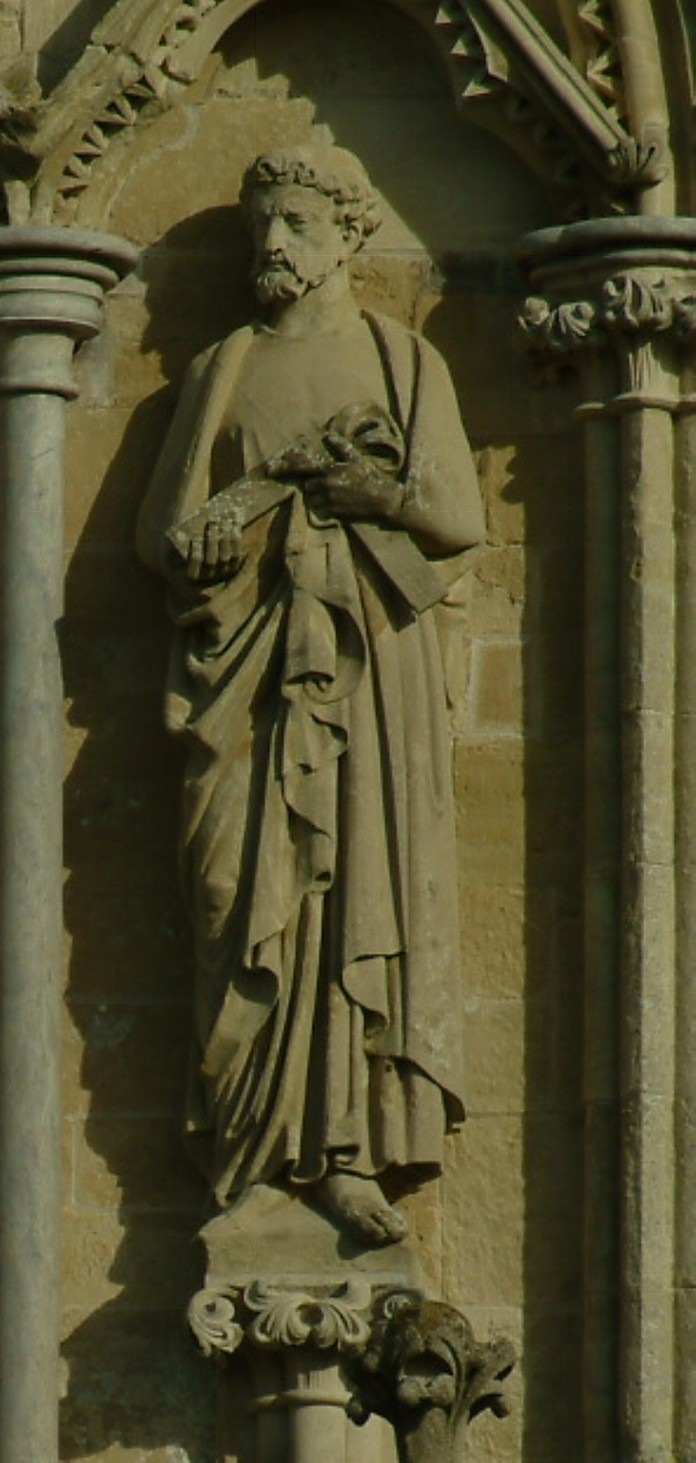
St Thomas

86
St Peter
?early 14th century
Anon
Both lower arms missing, a disc (the handle of one of his keys) below the right arm, Weathered appearance except the head, which may be a Victorian replacement.

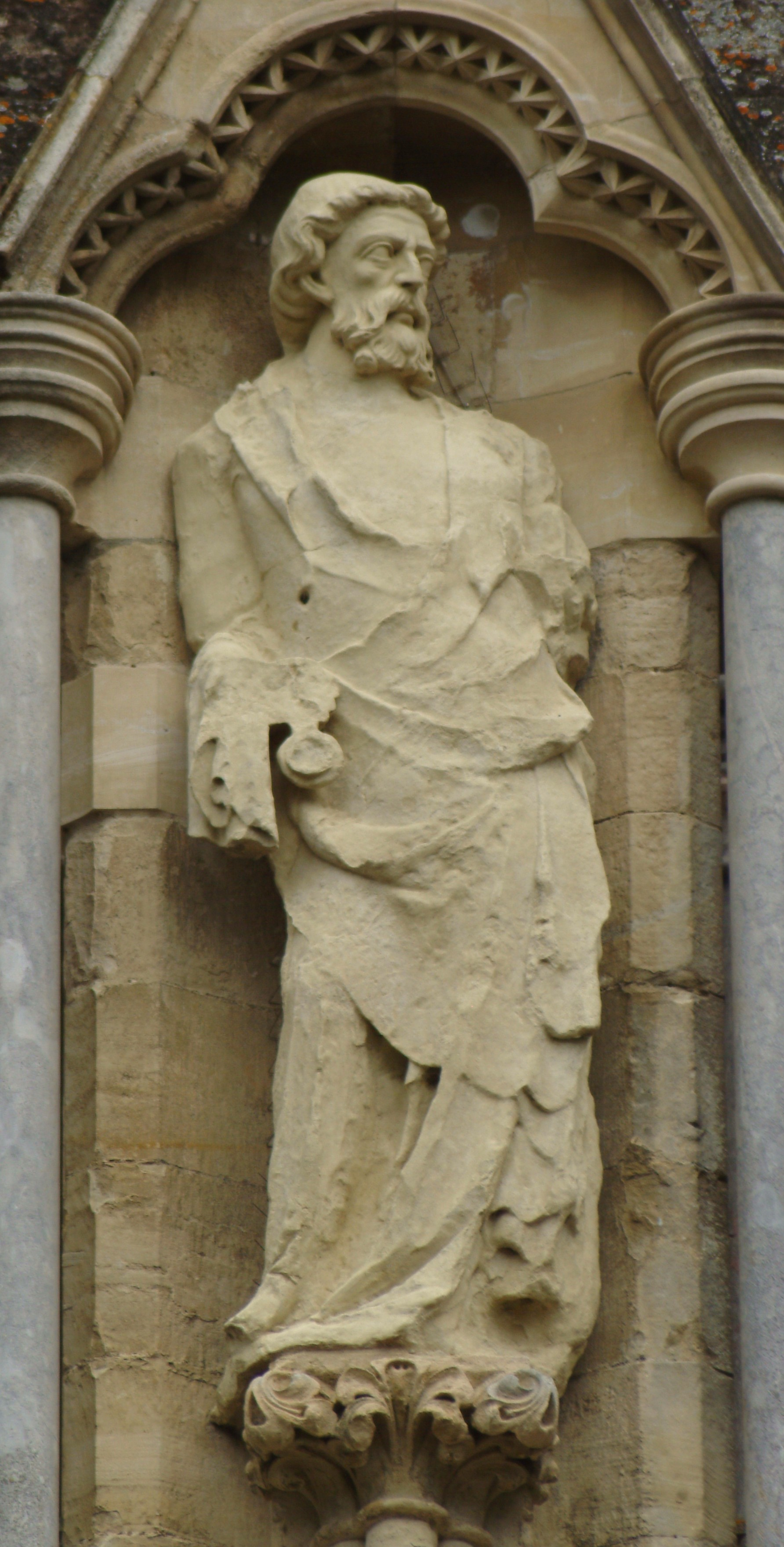
St Peter

89
St Mark the Evangelist
1870 or later
?James Redfern
Open book in left hand, pen in right hand, lion at feet.

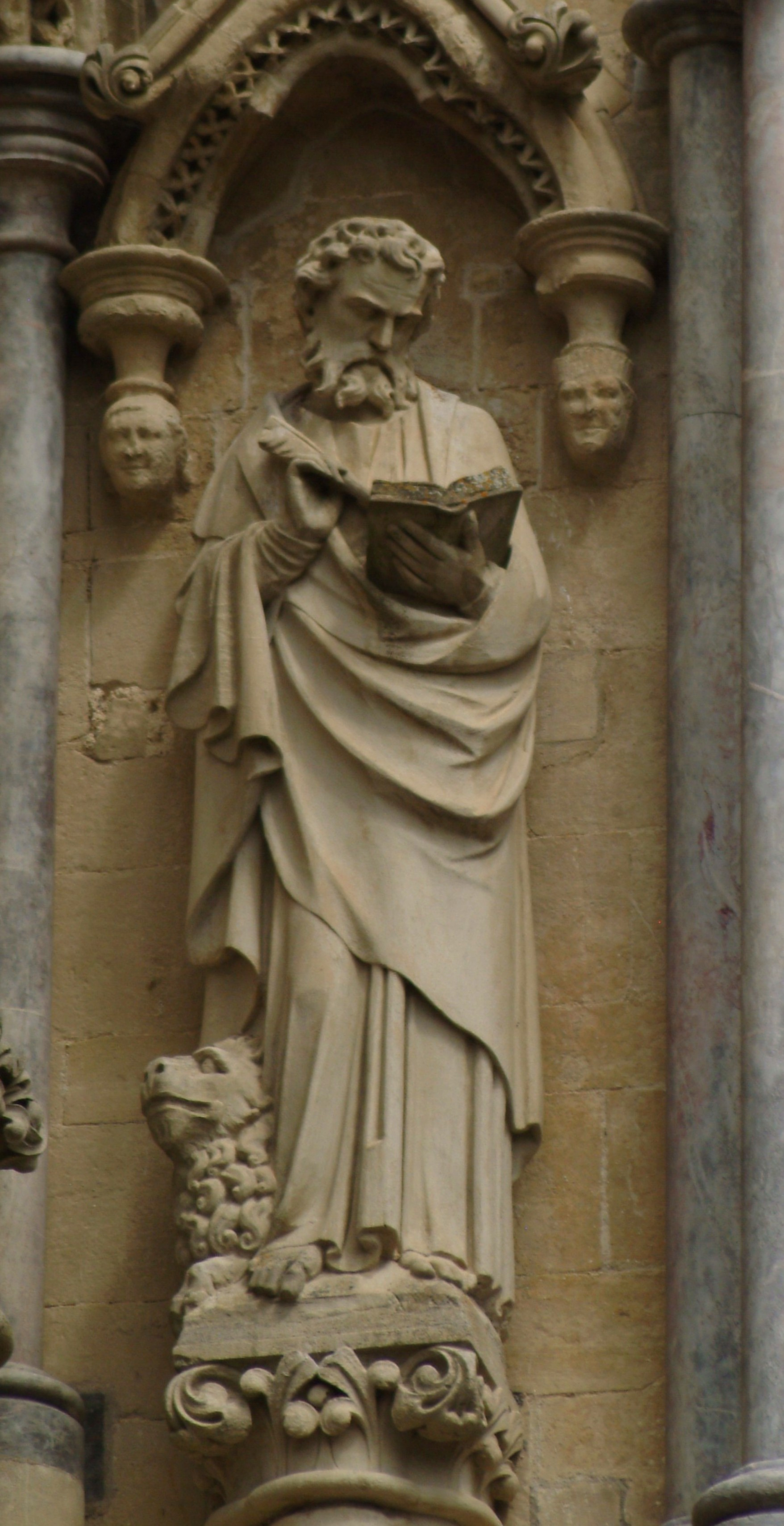
St Mark the Evangelist

90
St Matthew the Evangelist
1870 or later
?James Redfern
Open book in left hand, pen in right hand, angel at feet.

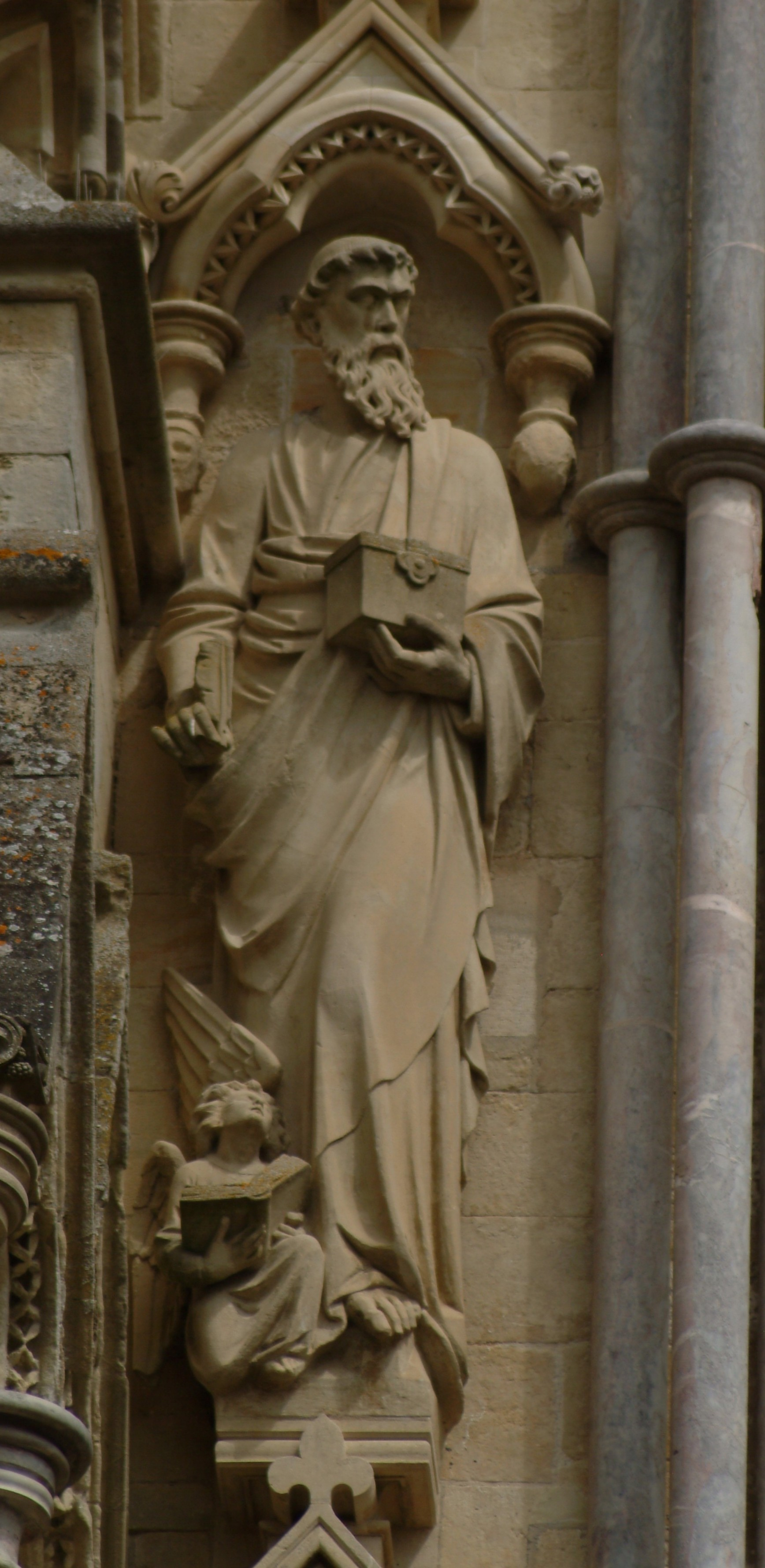
St Matthew the Evangelist

91
St Luke the Evangelist
1869–70
?James Redfern
Clasped book in left hand, pen in right hand, ox head and forelegs by left leg.

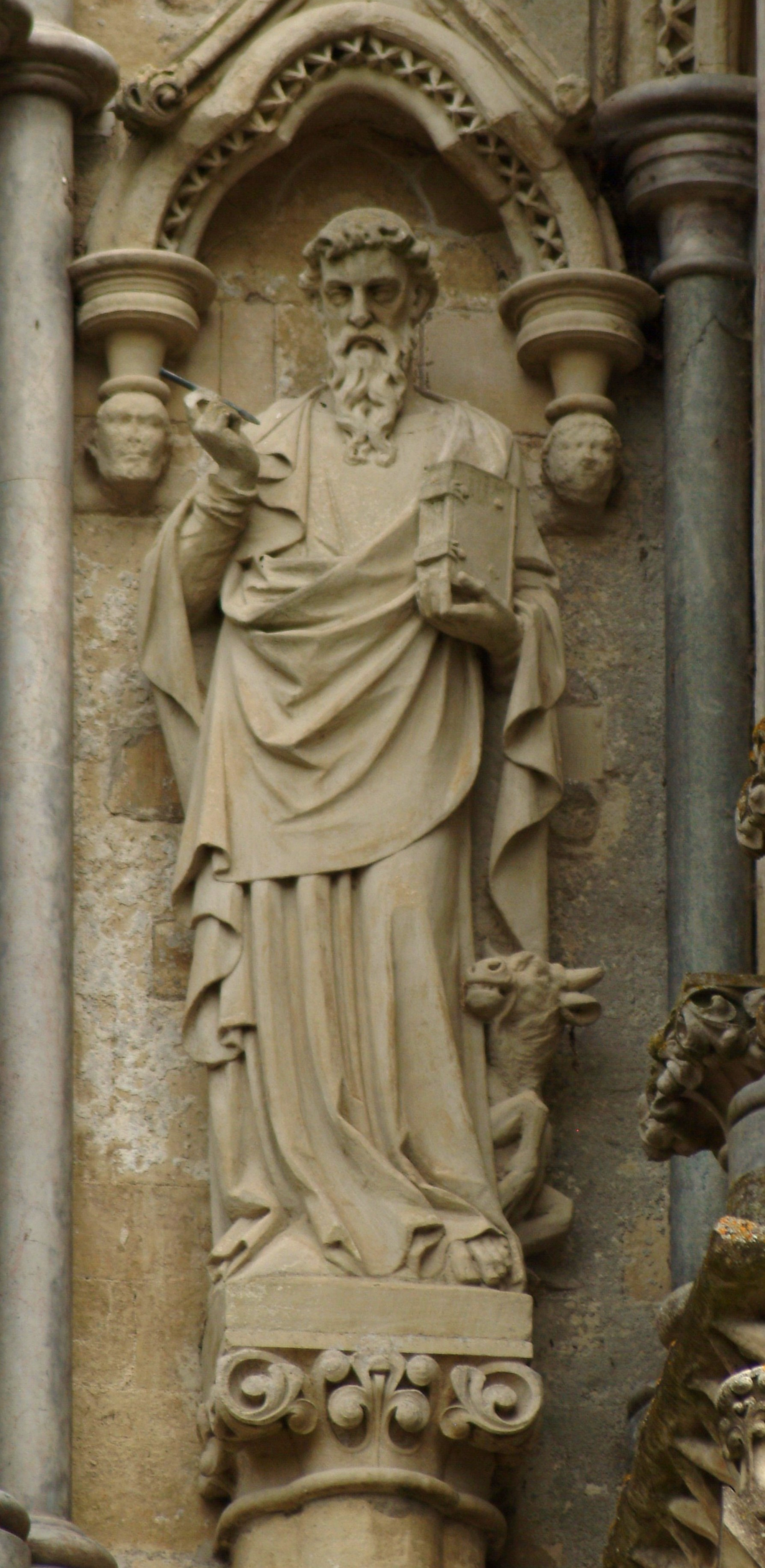
St Luke the Evangelist

92
St John the Evangelist
1869–70
James Redfern
Clasped book in right hand, a cup with an eagle in the left hand, an eagle at his feet.

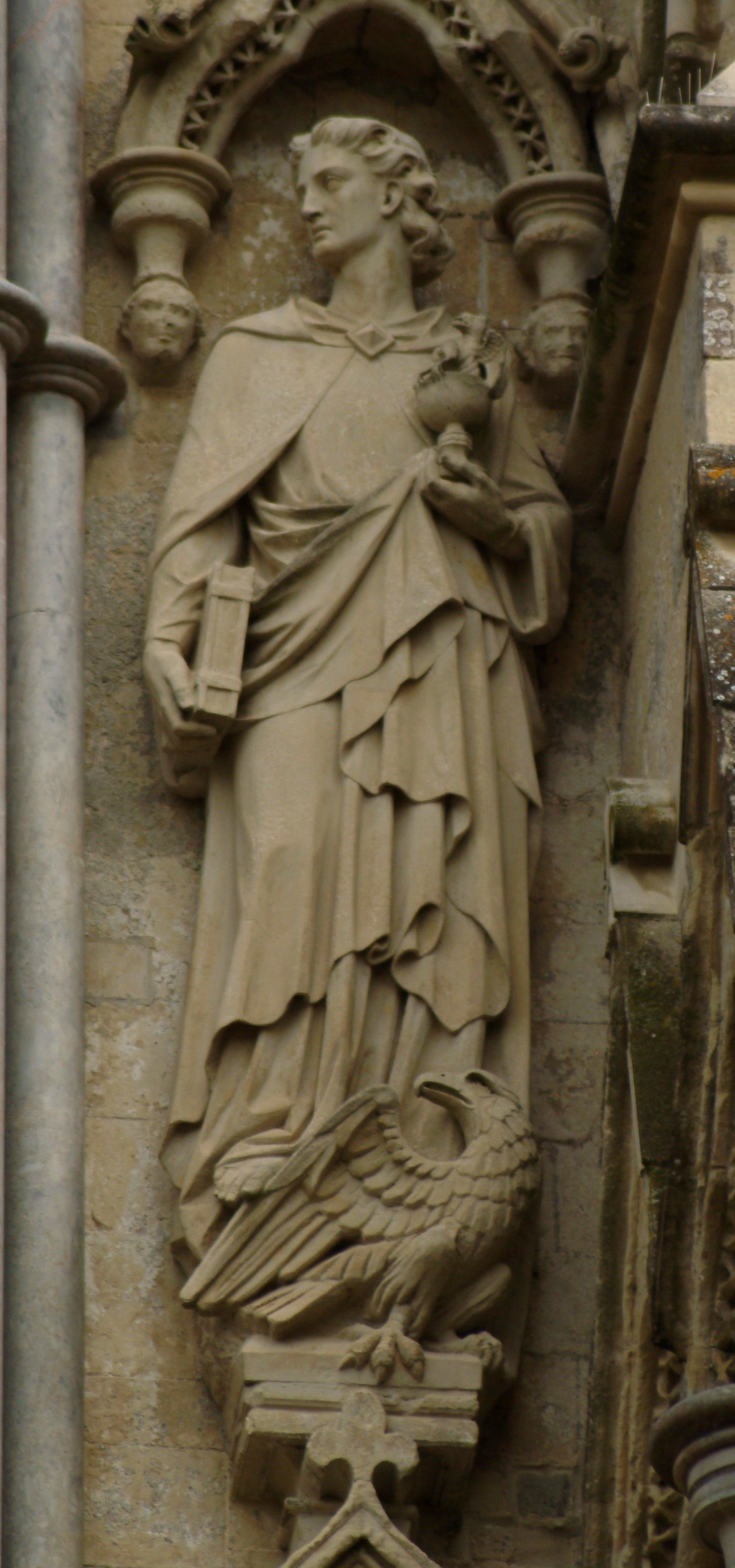
St John the Evangelist

95
St Paul
Early 14th century
Anon
Holding an upright sword in right hand, left arm missing, clothing detail obscured by protective coating.

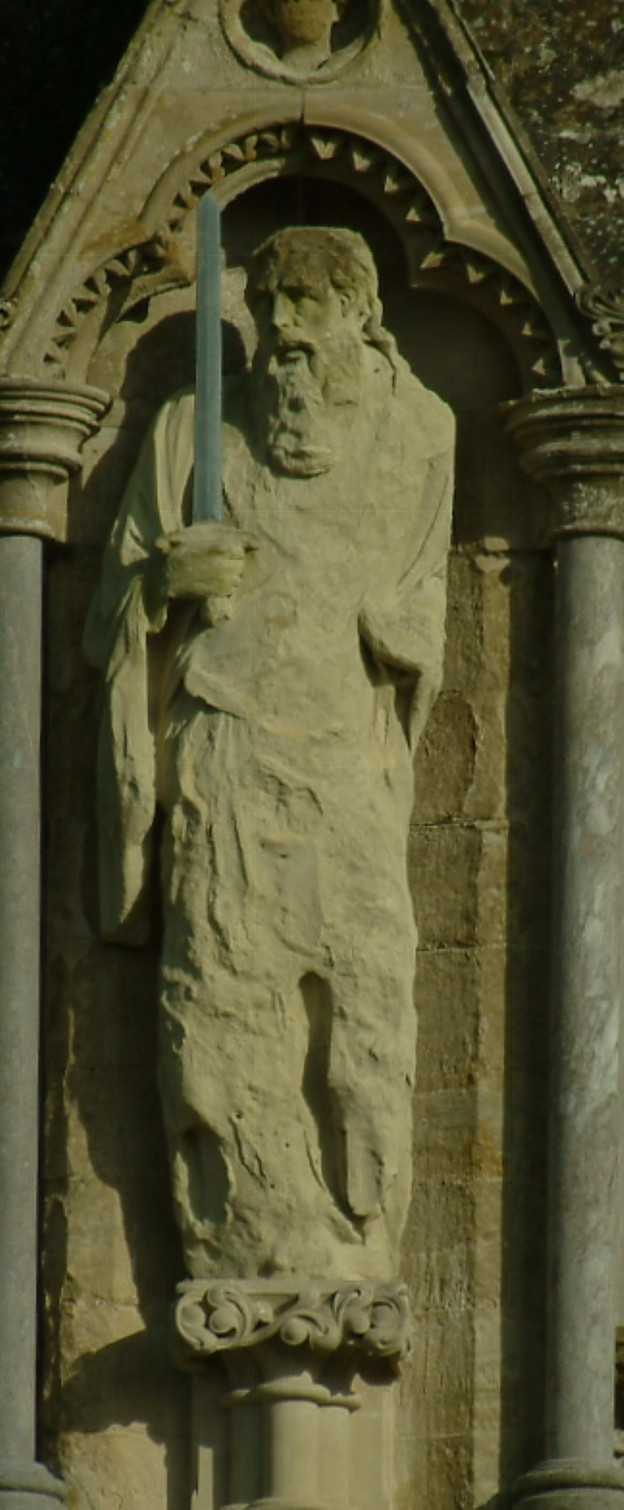
St. Paul

99
St James the Less
1867–69
James Redfern
Fuller's club held in left hand.

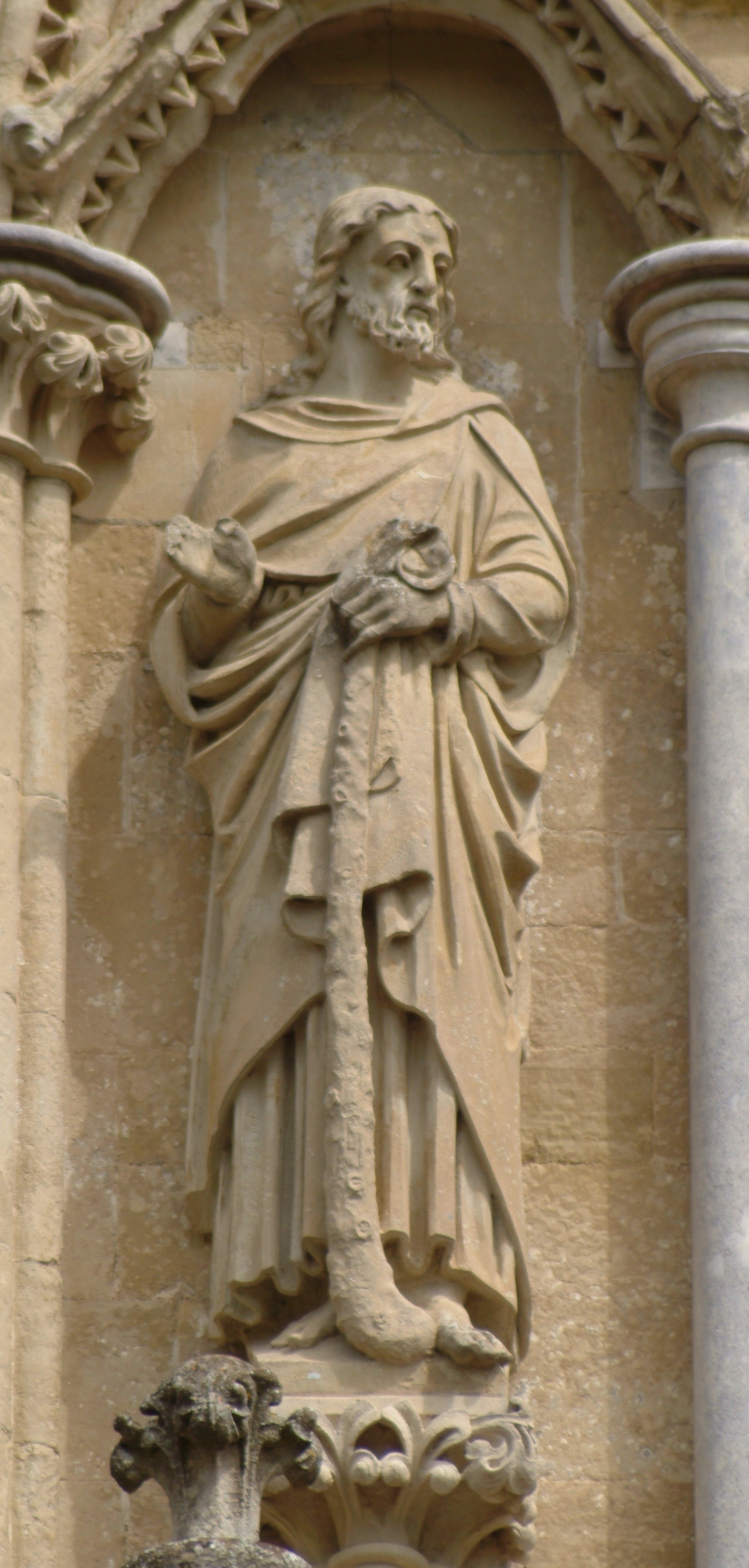
St James the Less

100
St James the Great
1867–69
James Redfern
Pilgrim's staff in right hand, forehead and hat damaged.

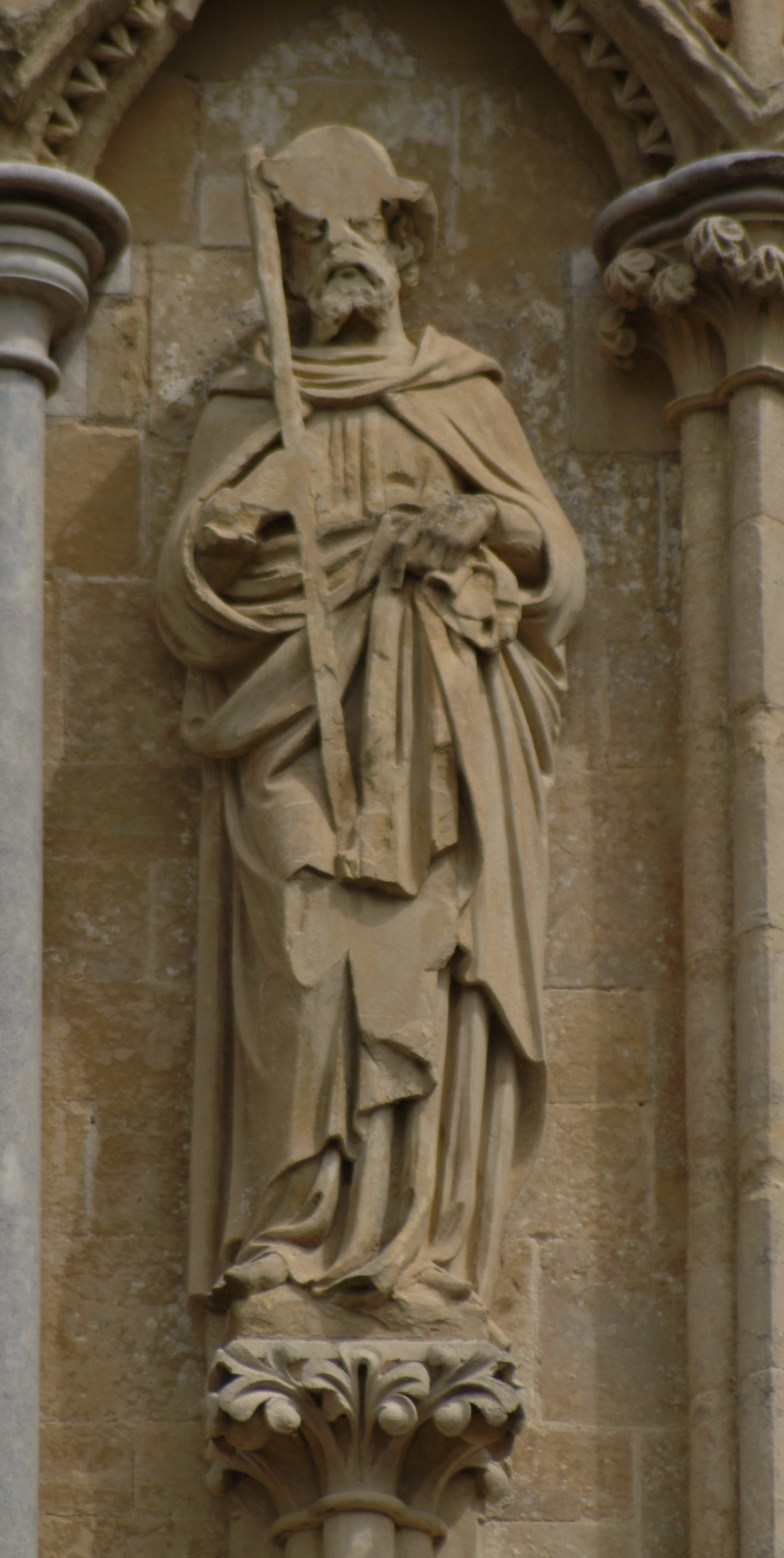
St James the Great

101
St Bartholomew
1867–69
James Redfern
Holding a knife in right hand.

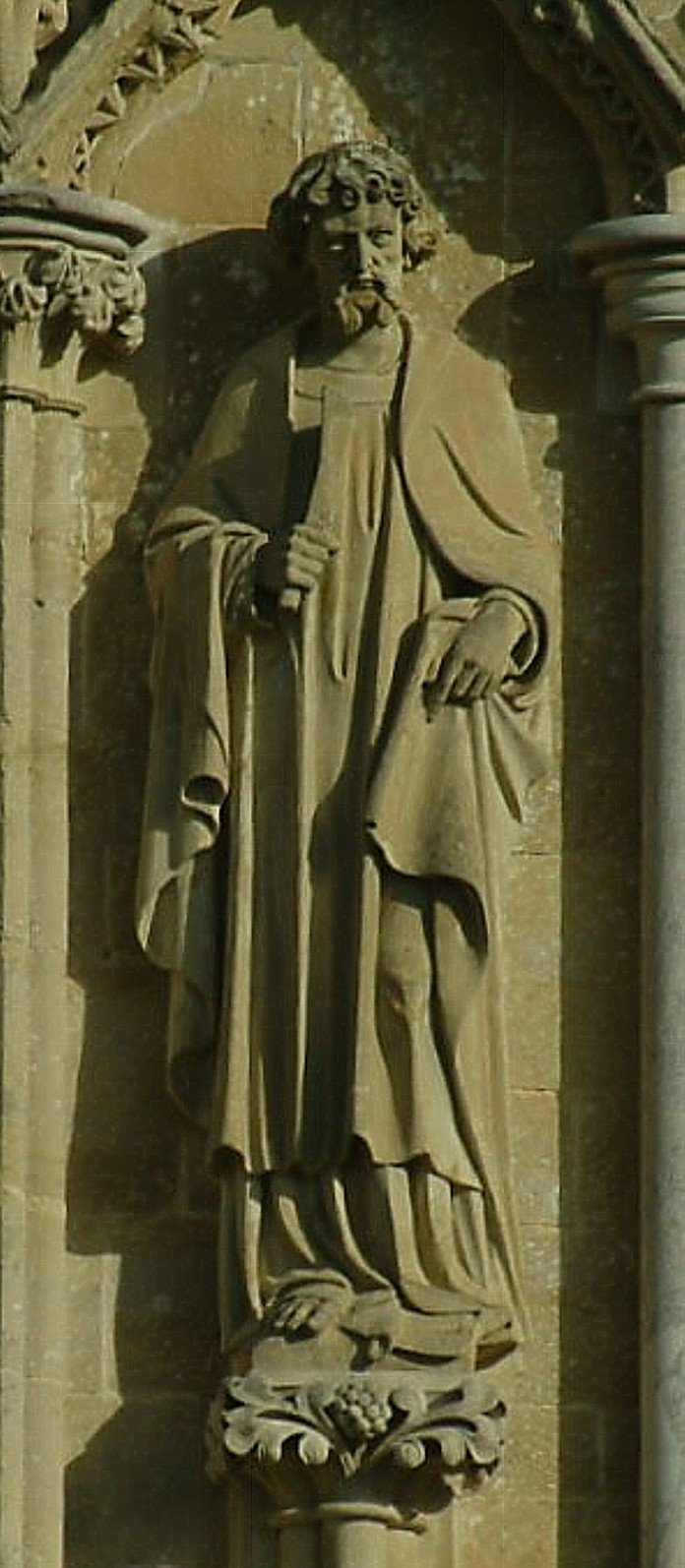
St. Bartholomew

102
St Matthias
1867–69
James Redfern
Hands at chest holding a staff.

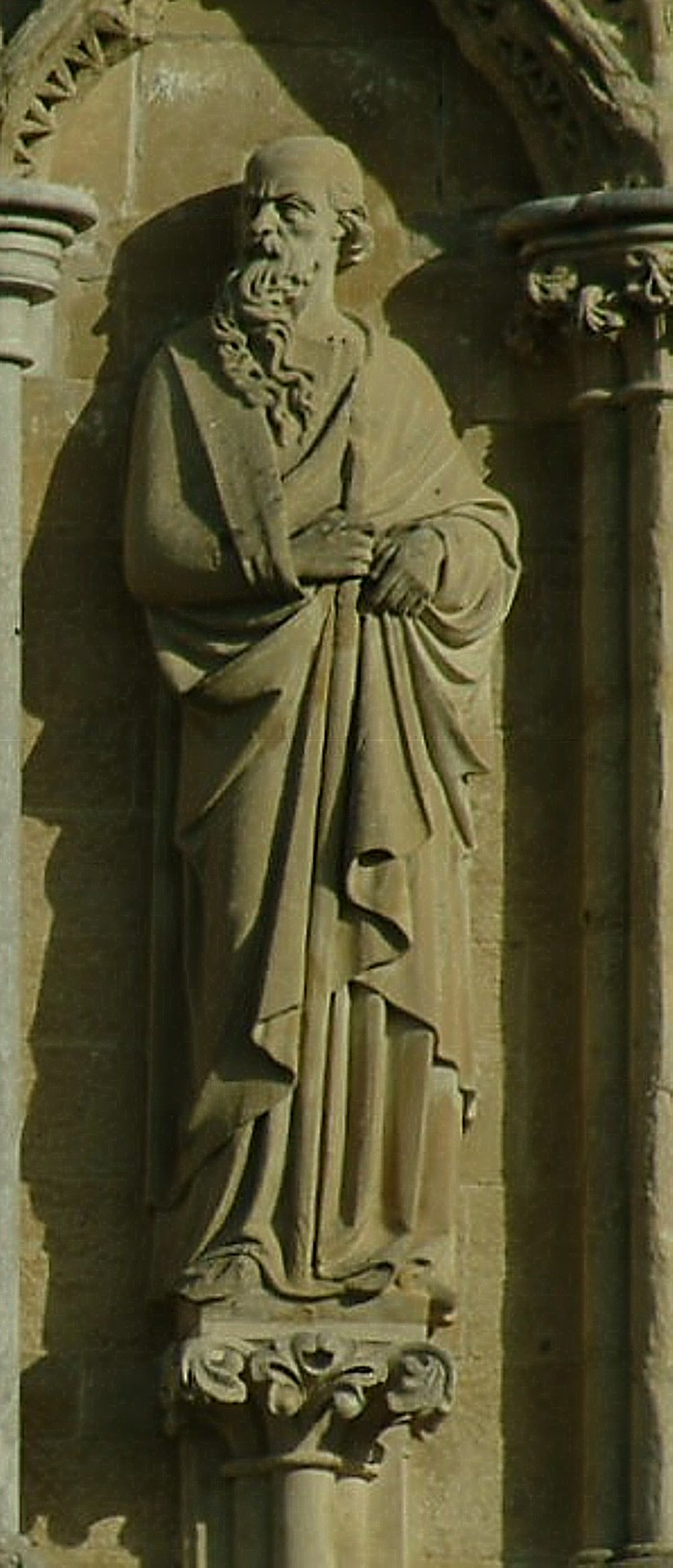
St. Matthias

=== Tier 5: Doctors, Virgins and Martyrs ===
116
St Patrick
After 1870
James Redfern
On north face. Holding a crozier and dominating a snake at his feet.

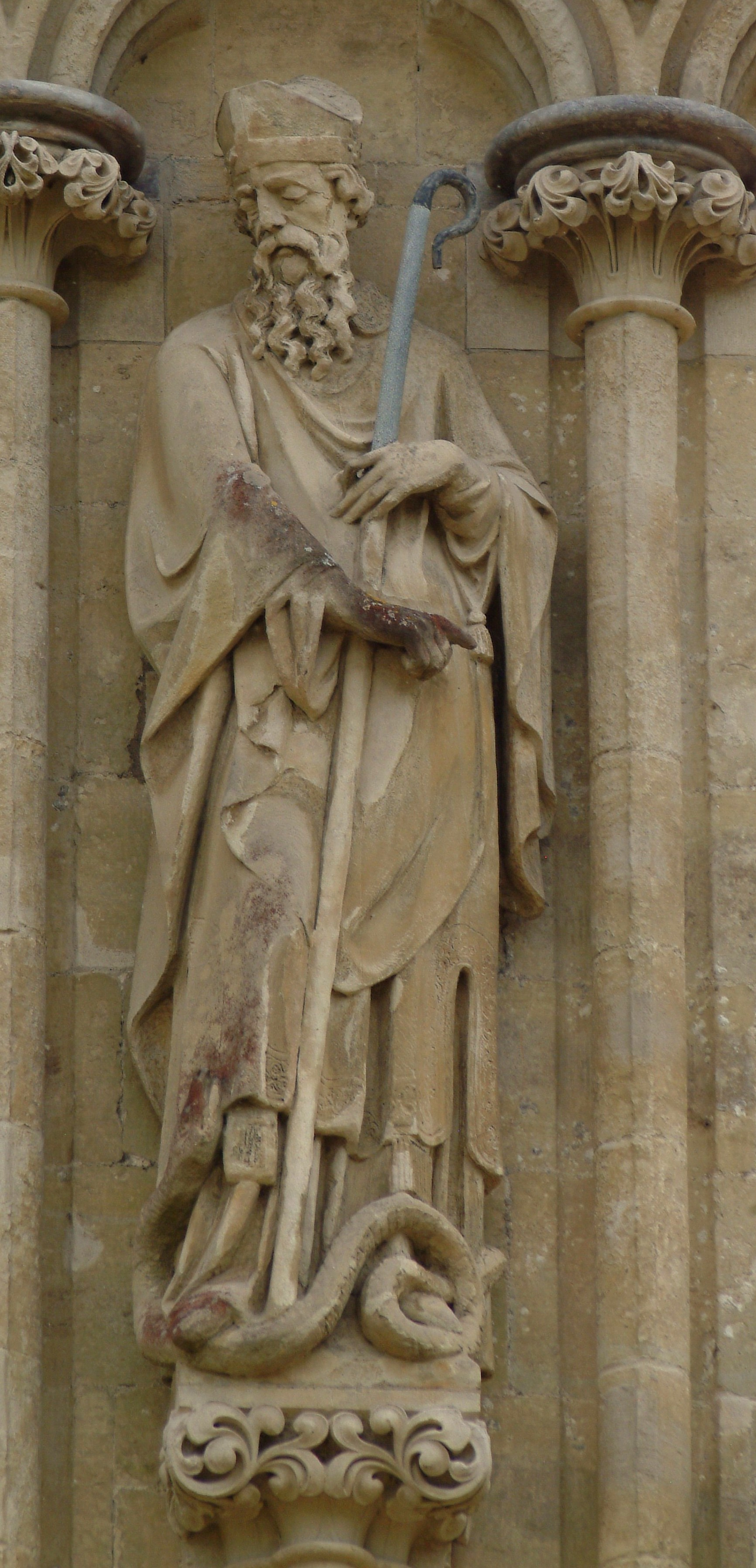
St Patrick

119
St Ambrose
1867–69
James Redfern
Wearing a mitre, staff in left hand.

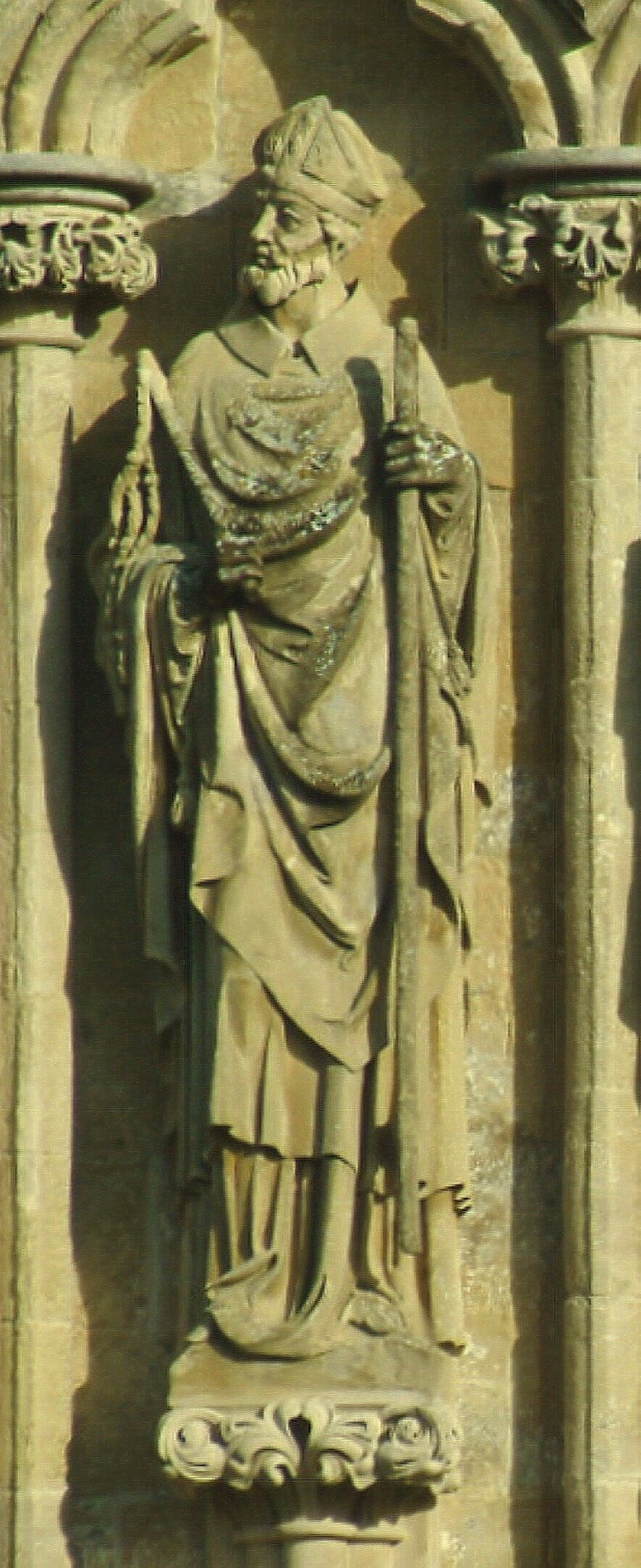
St Ambrose

120
St Jerome
1867–69
James Redfern
Wearing a wide brimmed hat, a book in the left hand and a model church in the right hand.

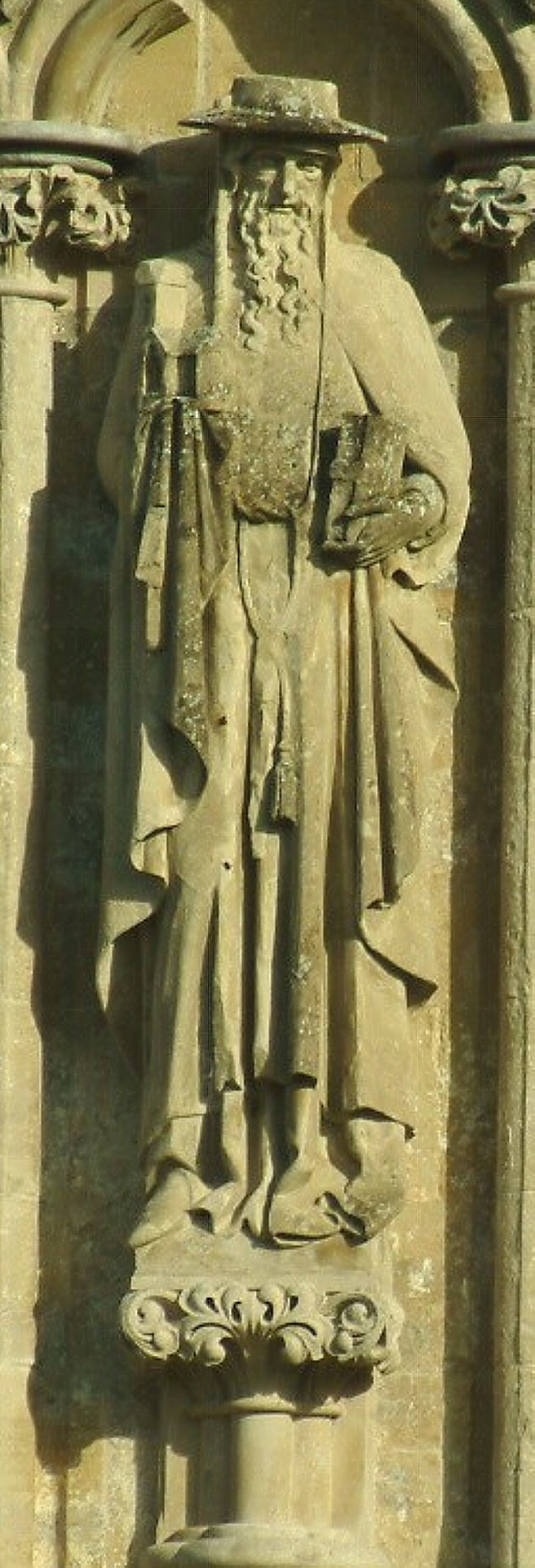
St. Jerome

121
St Gregory
1867–69
James Redfern
Wearing a papal tiara, a dove on the right shoulder and a sceptre in the left hand.

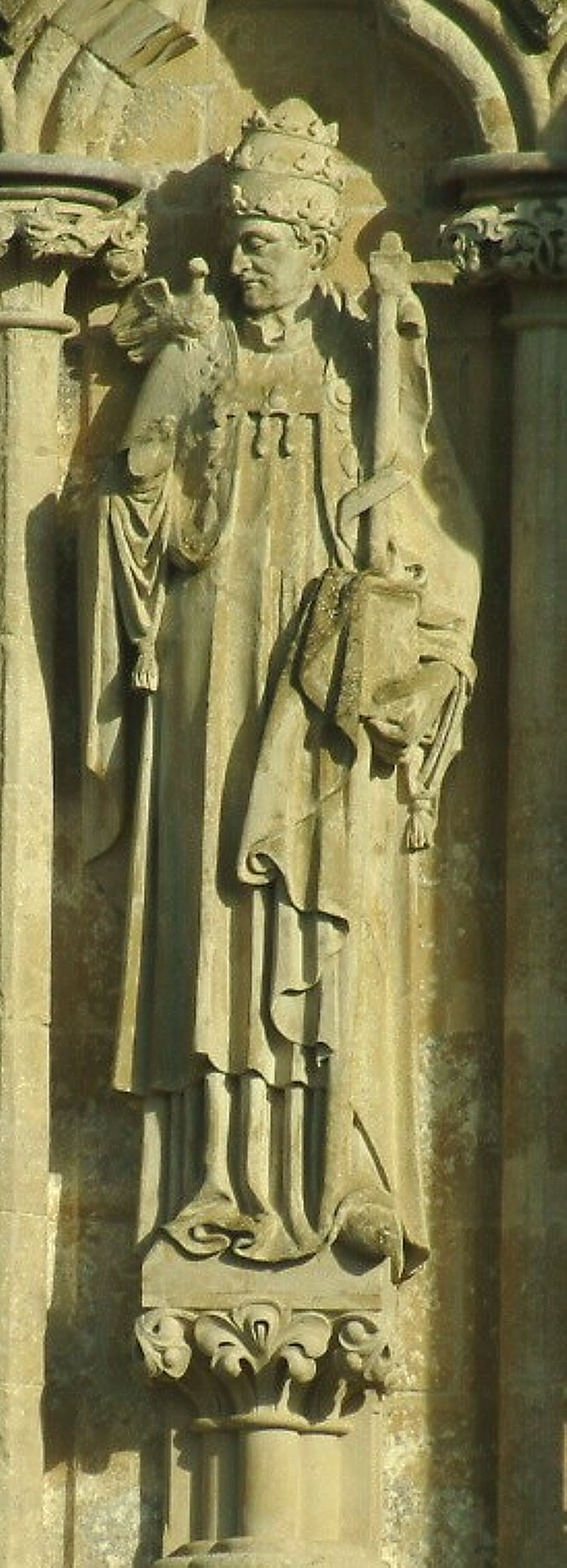
St. Gregory

122
St Augustine of Hippo
1867–69
James Redfern
Wearing a mitre, a crozier supported on left wrist. Flaming heart in right hand

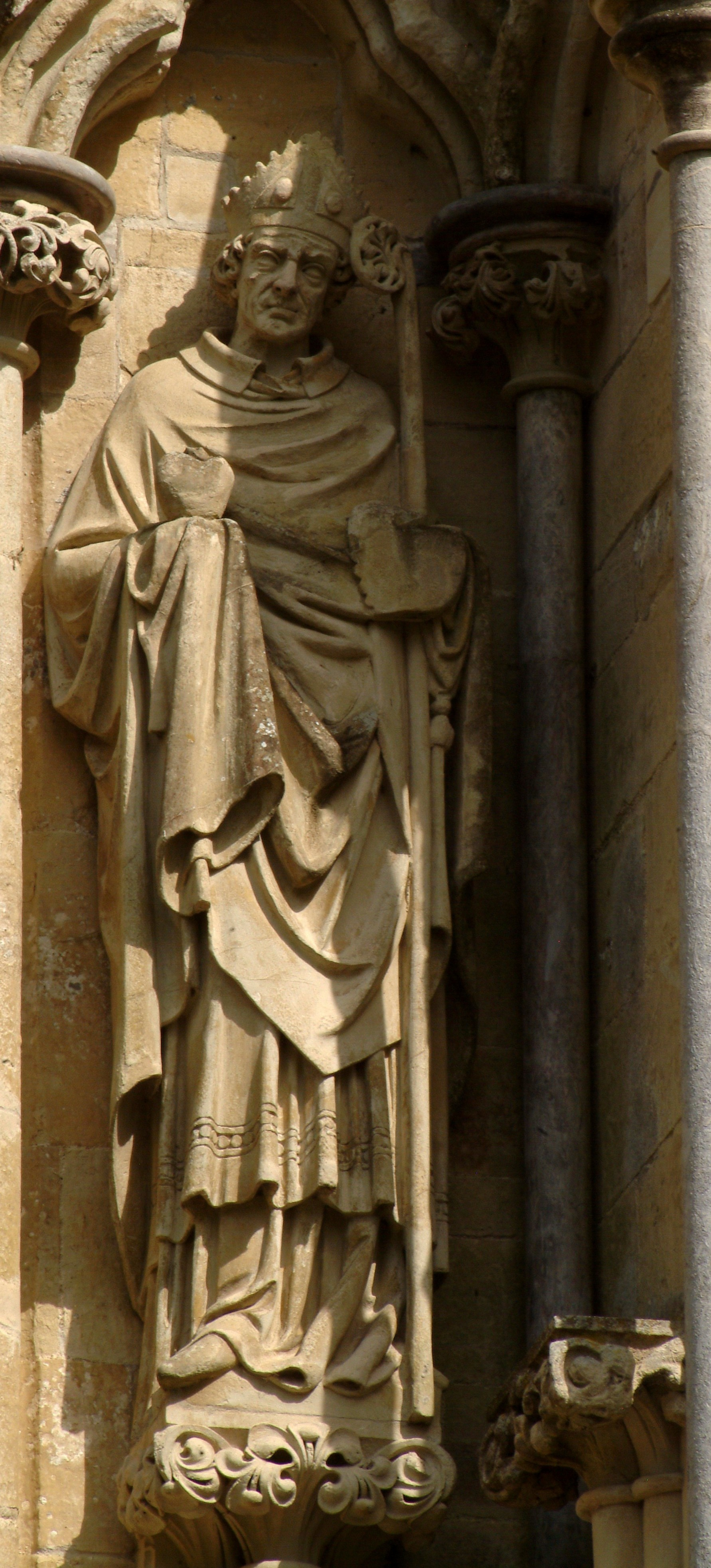
St Augustine of Hippo

124
St Aldhelm
2001.
Jay Battle
Supporting a harp at his feet.

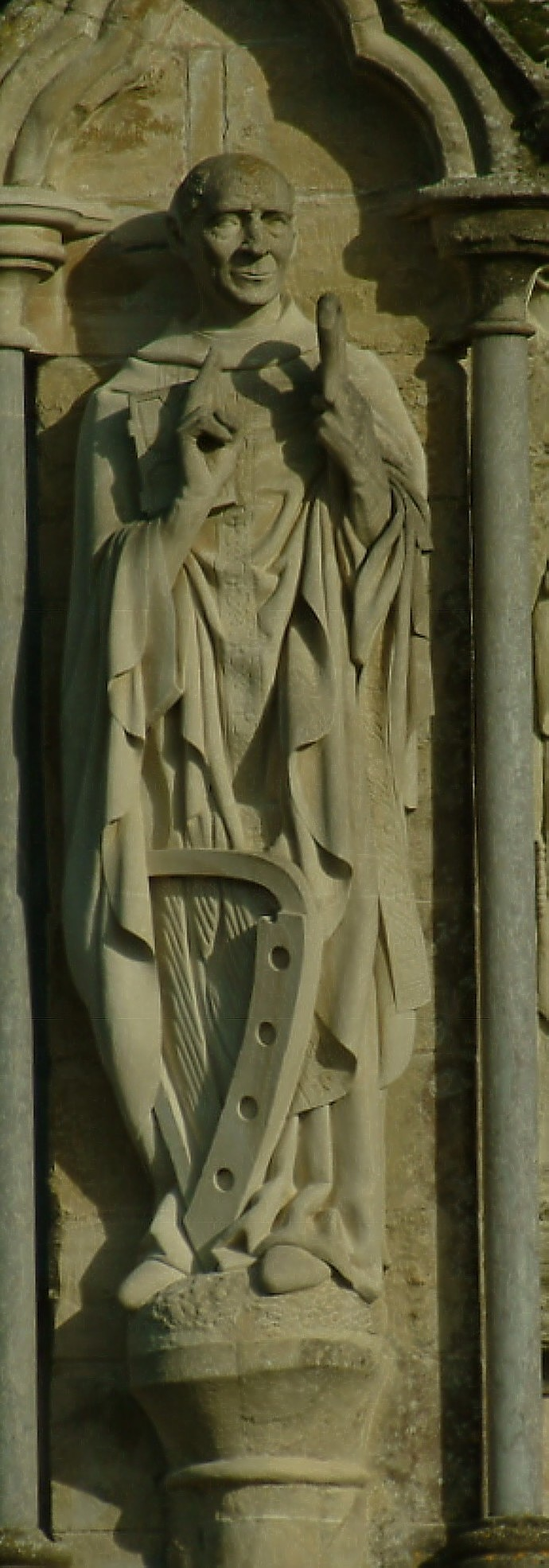
St. Aldhelm

125
St Remigius of Rheims
c. 1873
?James Redfern
Wearing a mitre, right hand raised in benediction left hand holding a book, crozier in left elbow.

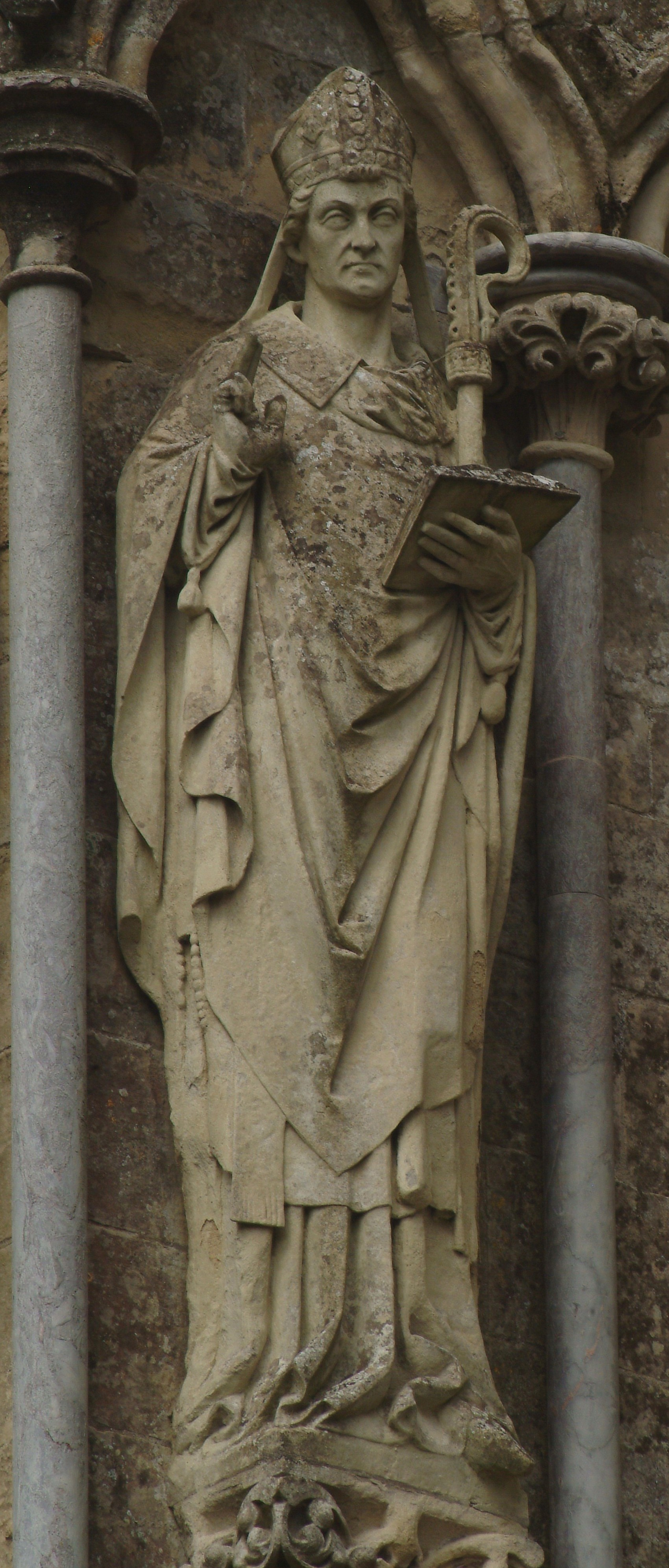
St Remigius of Rheims

129
St John the Evangelist
14th century
Anon
Right hand raised, bird on shoulder, clothing detail obscured by protective coating.

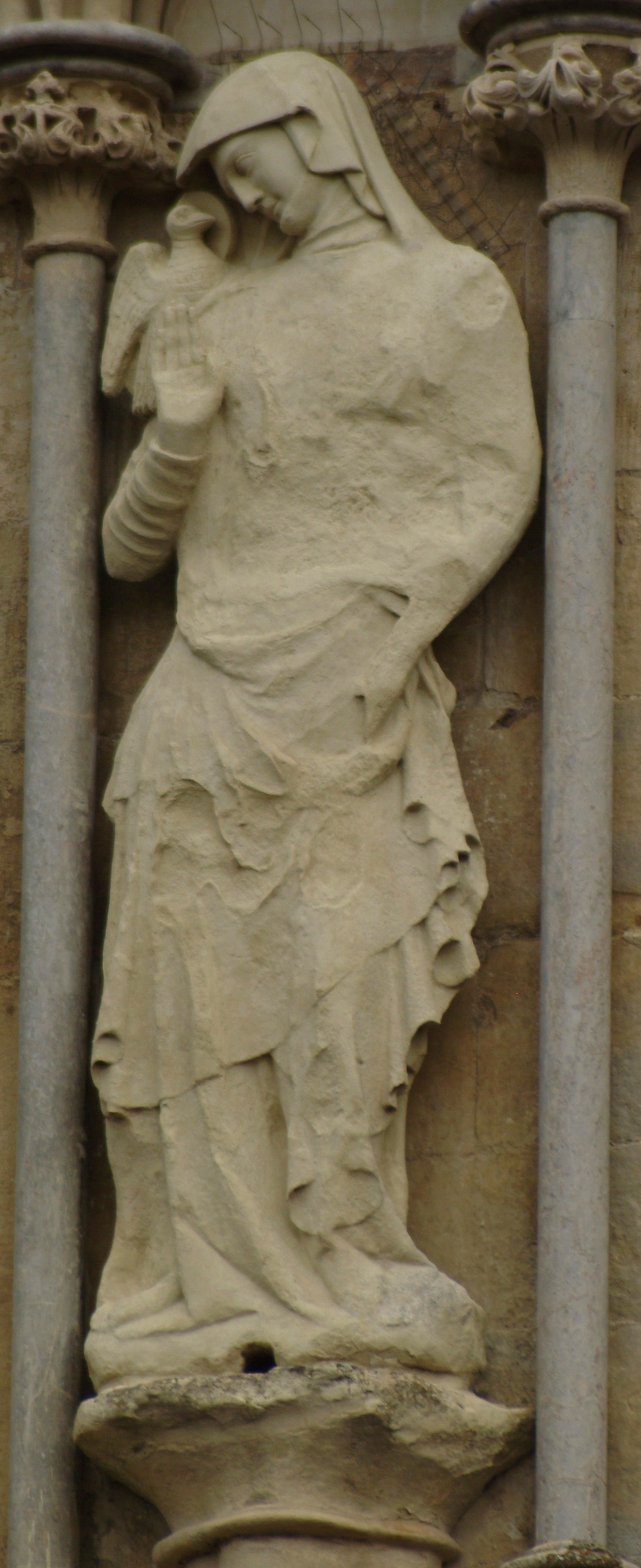
St John the Evangelist

132
St Barbara
1868
James Redfern
Holding martyr's palm in right hand, open book in left hand, small castle behind right leg.

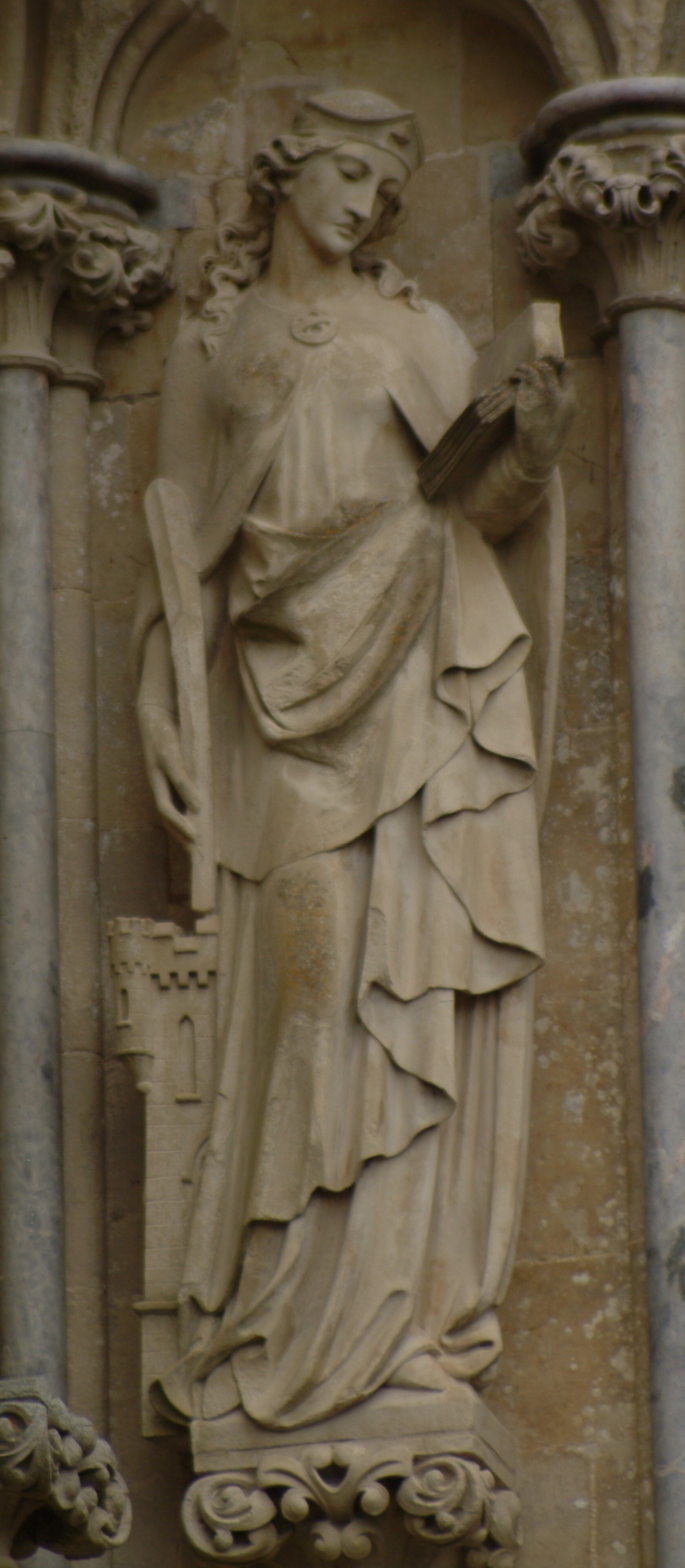
St Barbara

133
St Katherine
?1868
James Redfern
Supporting a long sword with the left hand, wheel behind legs.

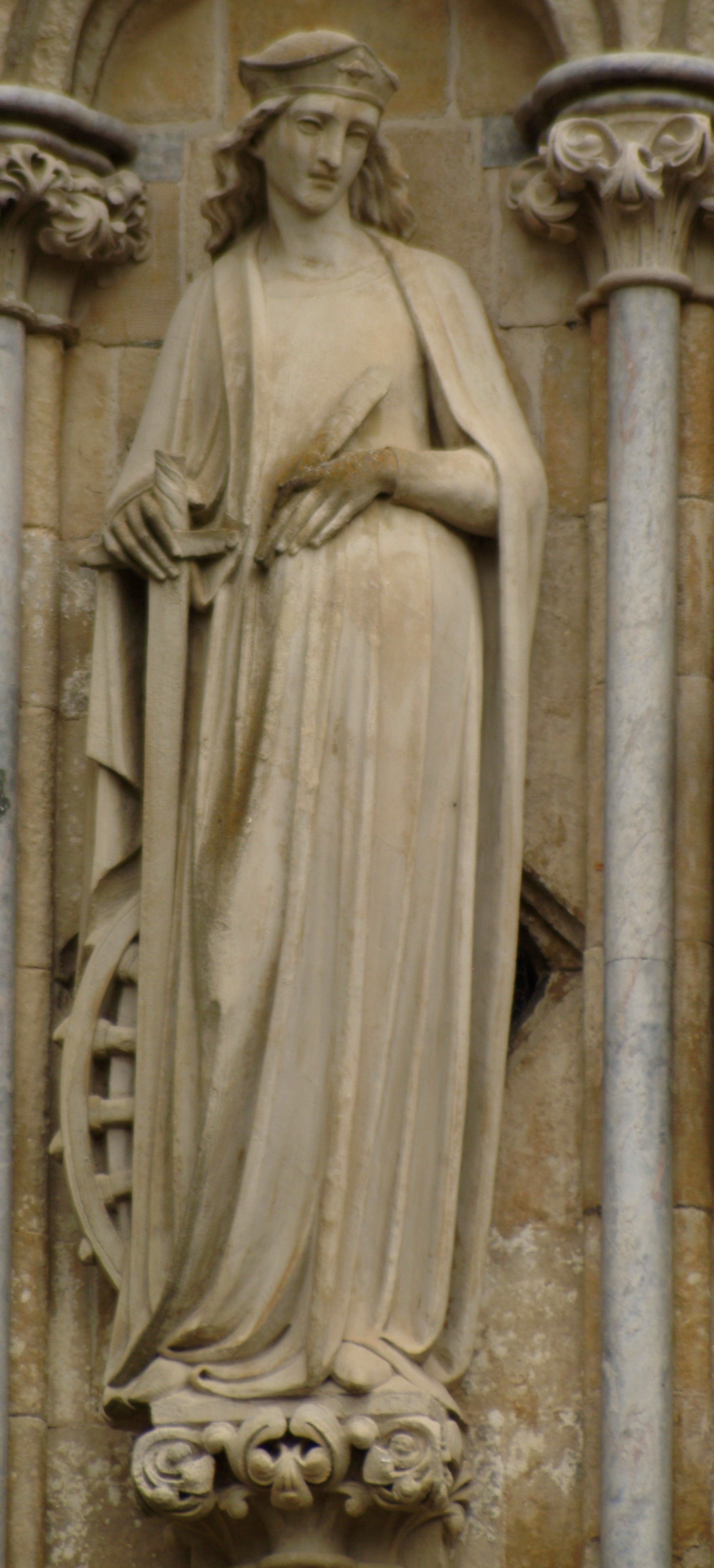
St Katherine

134
St Roch
?1868
James Redfern
Revealing the plague mark on left thigh, a small attentive dog sits in front.

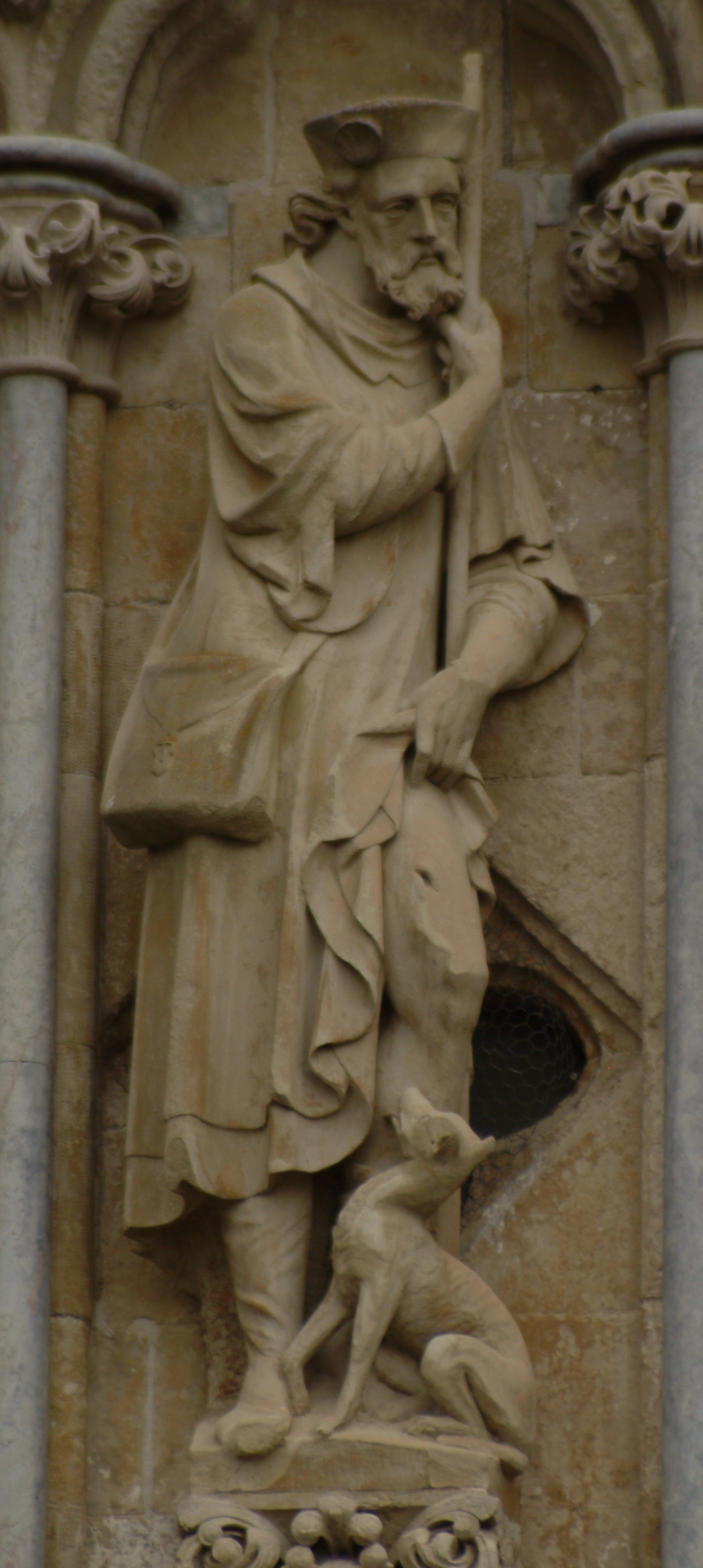
St Roche

135
St Nicholas
?1868
James Redfern
Wearing a mitre, left hand is missing, right hand holding three 'golden' balls, lower part of a staff remains.

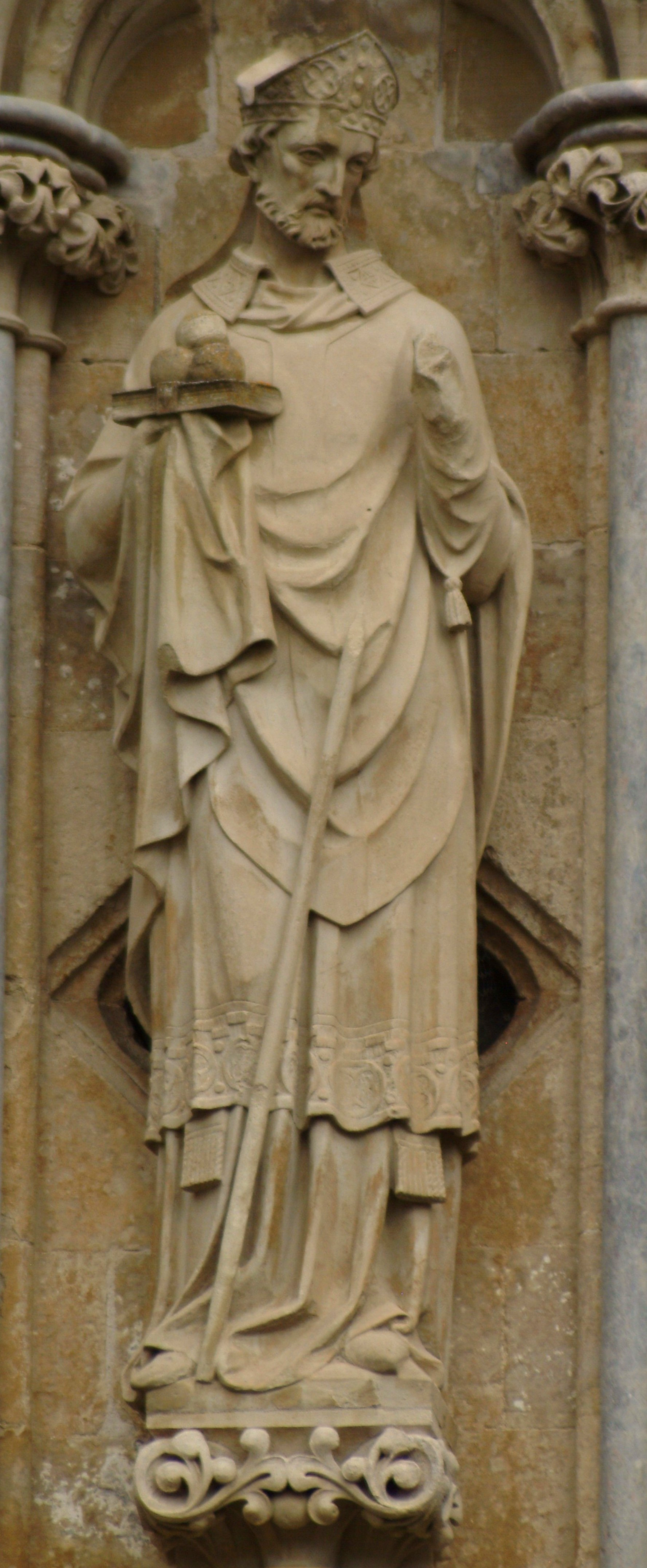
St Nicholas

136
St George
?1868
James Redfern
A shield on left elbow, sword supported by left hand, right hand holding head of dragon.

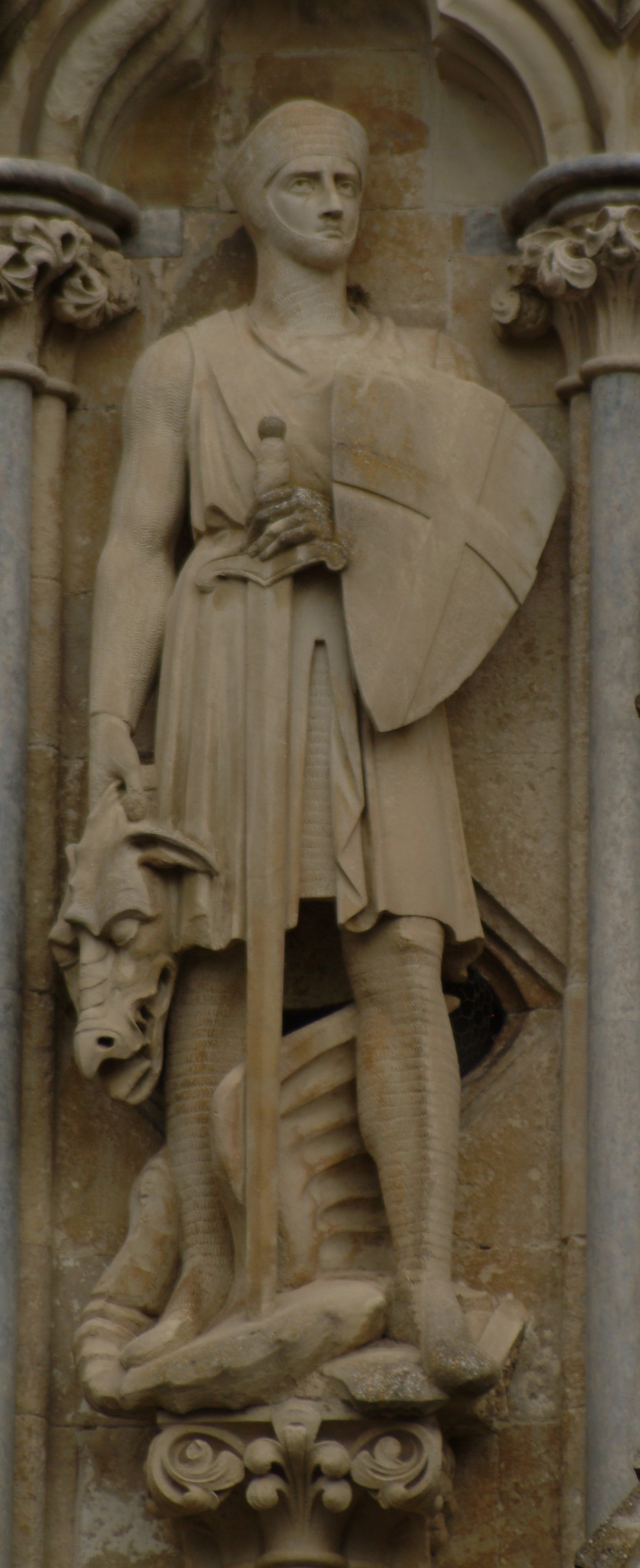
St George

137
St Christopher
?1868
James Redfern
Carrying the Christ Child on the left shoulder, right hand supporting a large staff.

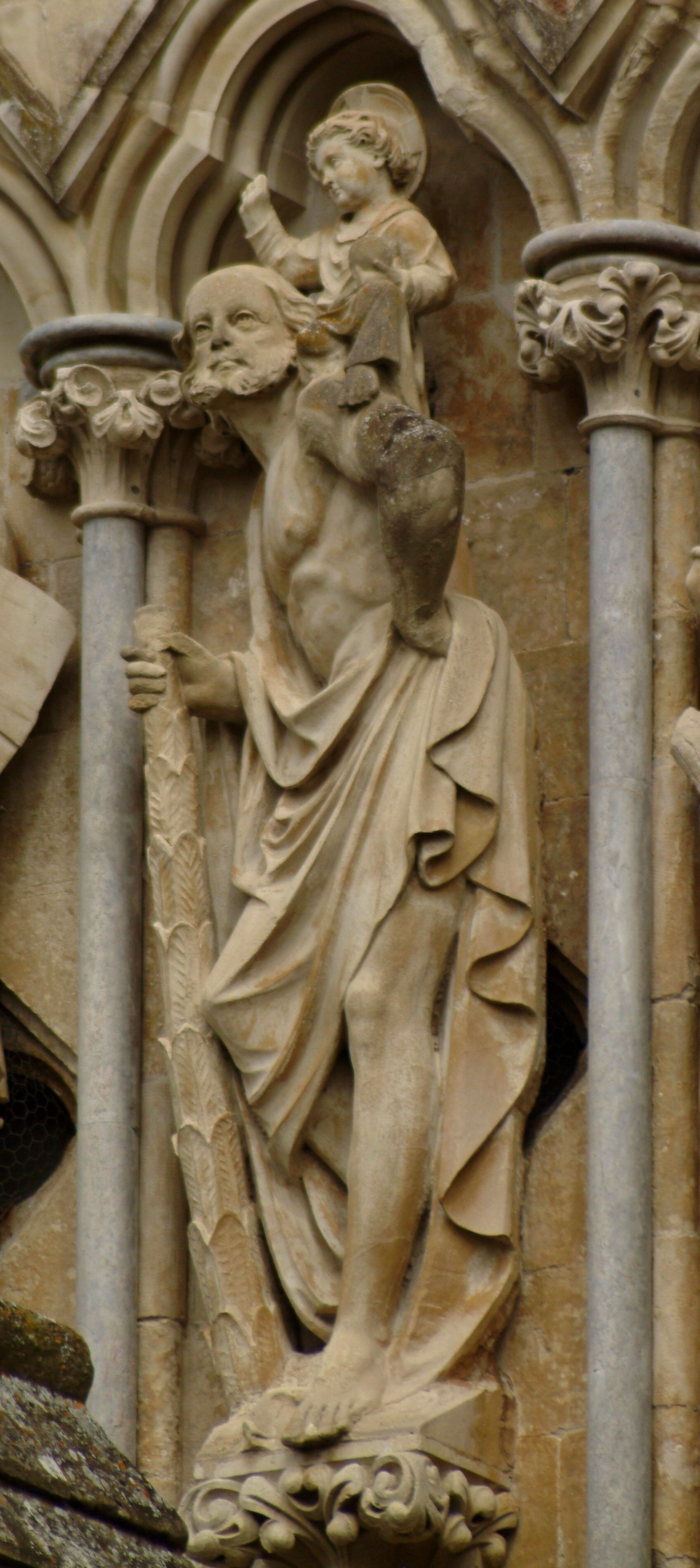
St Christopher

138
St Sebastian
?1868
James Redfern
Arms tied behind his back, pierced with three arrows.

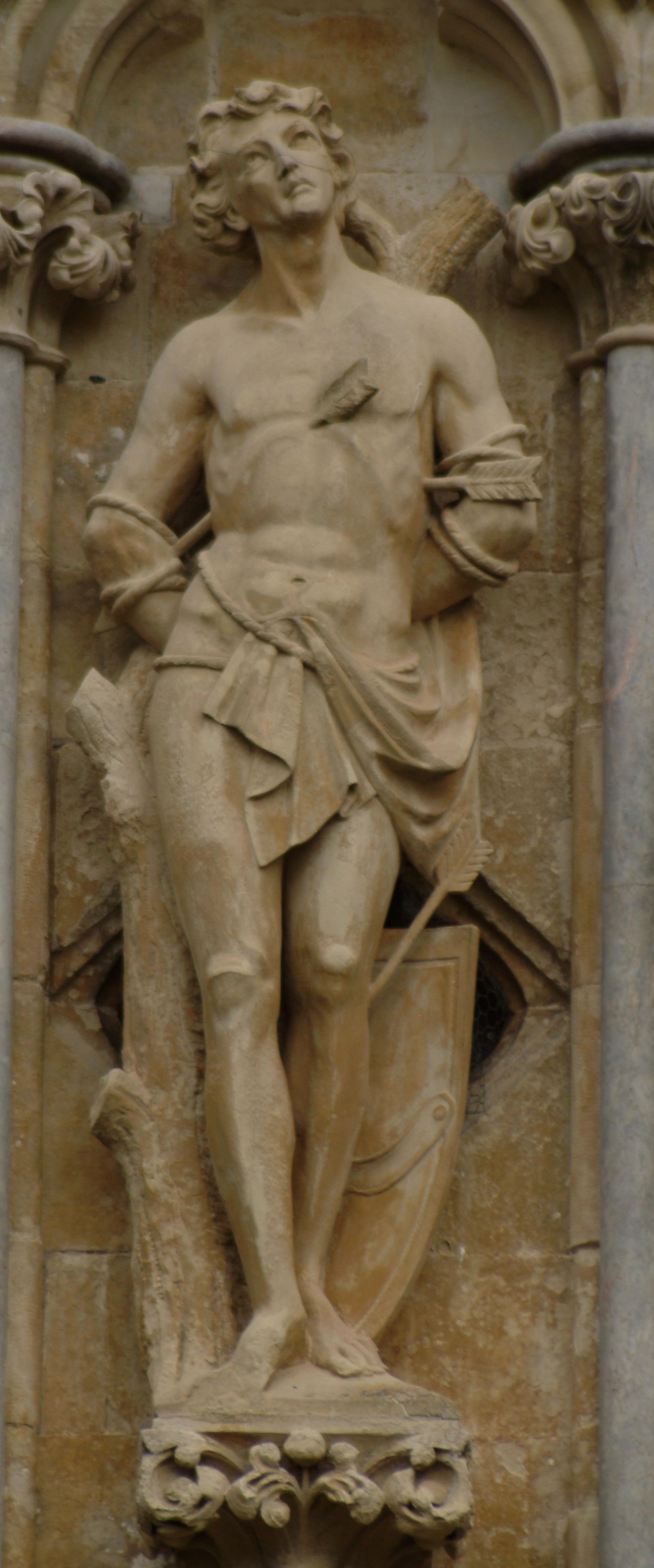
St Sebastian

139
St Cosmas
?1868
James Redfern
Left hand on hip holding clothes, right hand hold cuboid box.

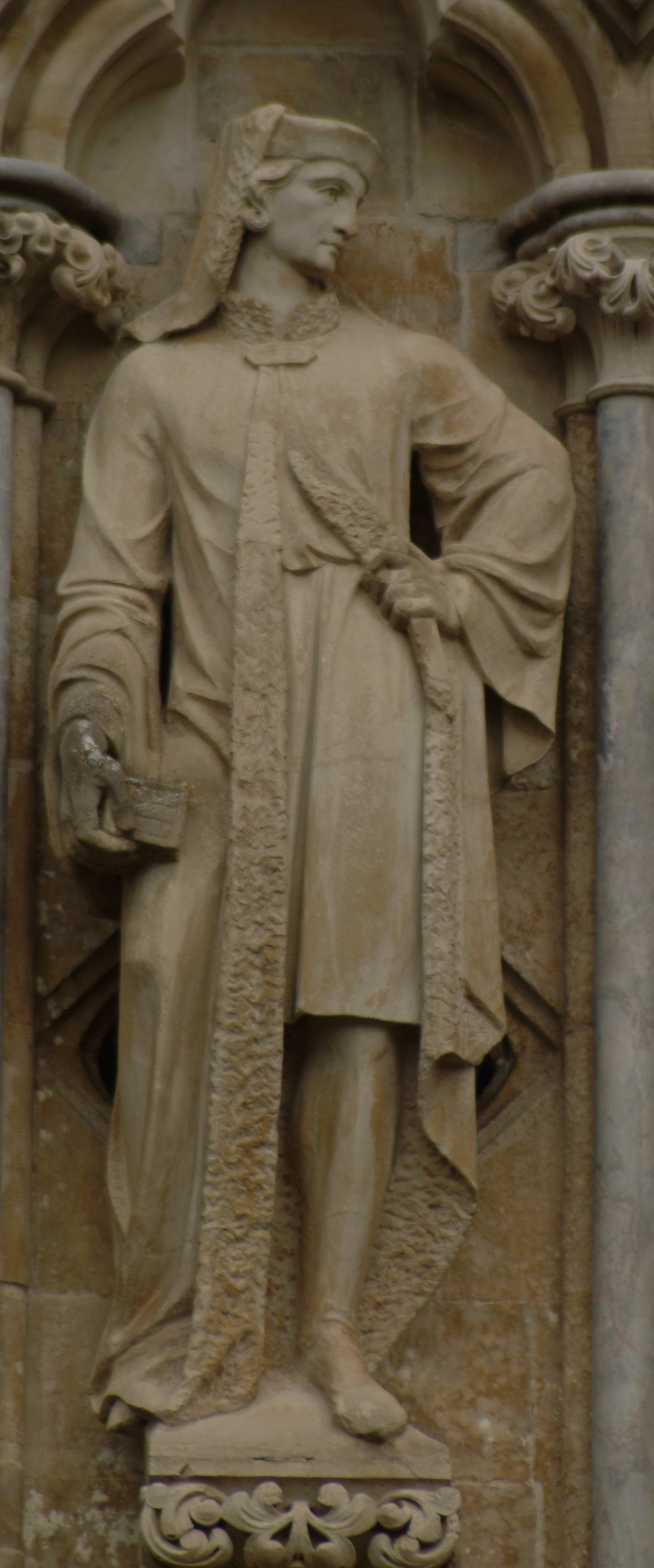
St Cosmas

140
St Damian
?1868
James Redfern
Right hand raised, left hand holding a pestle and mortar.

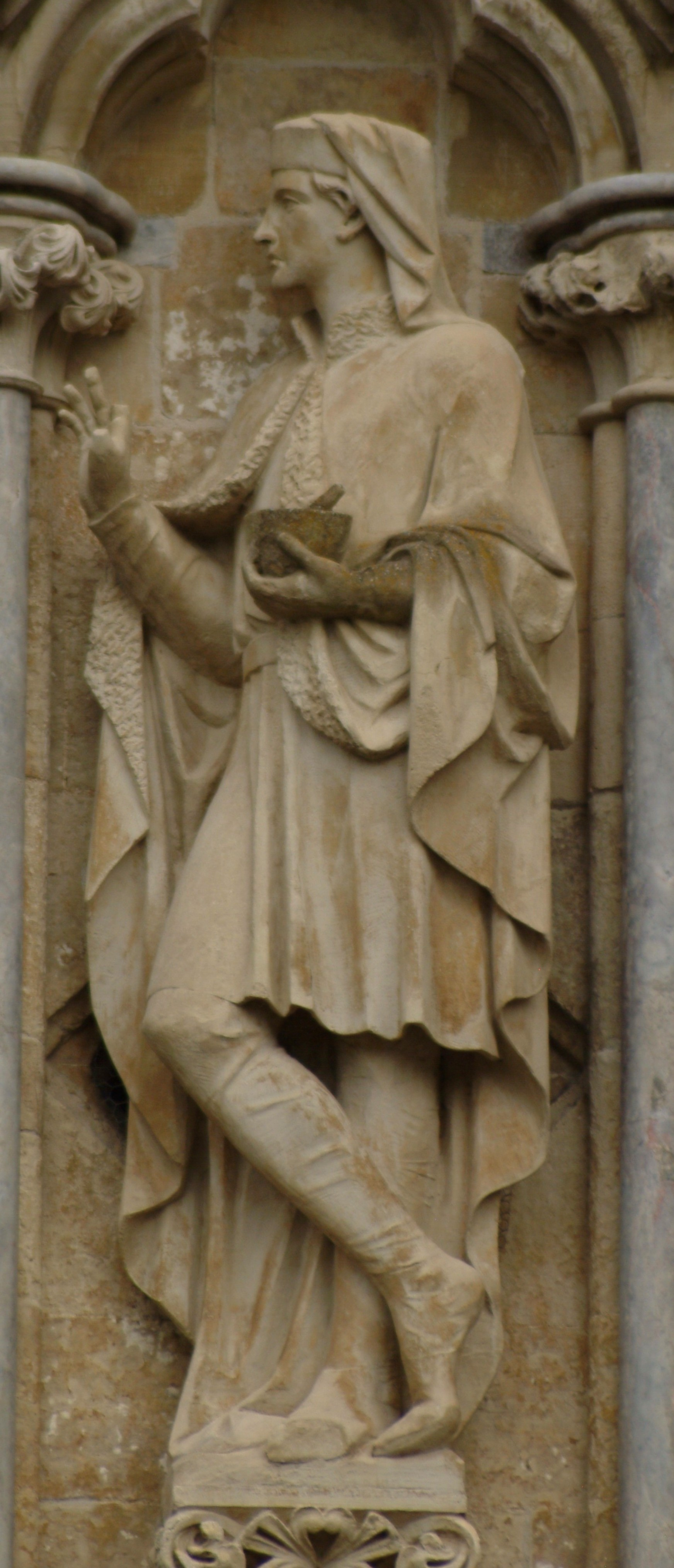
St Damian

141
St Margaret of Antioch
?1868
James Redfern
Holding a crucifix in the left hand, looking down at the dragon at her feet

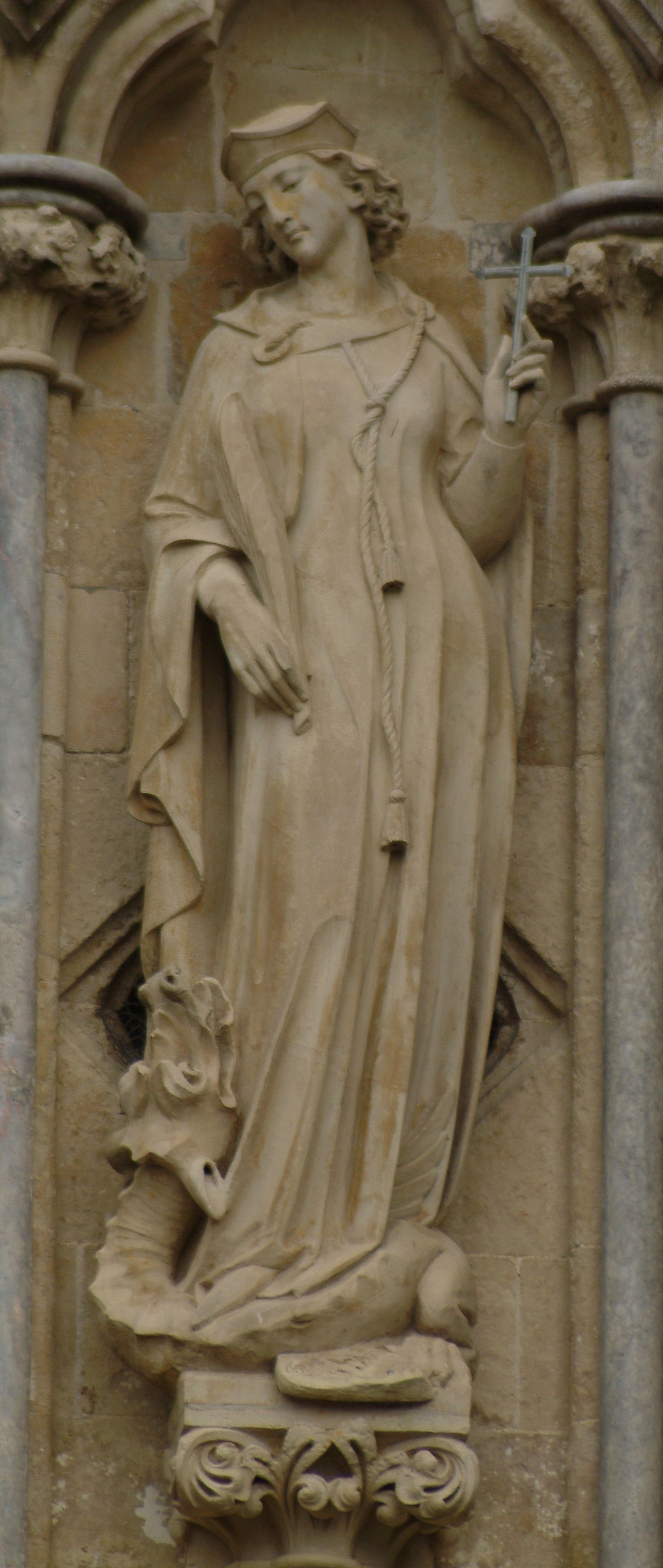
St Margaret of Antioch

142
St Ursula
?1868
James Redfern
The remains of a martyr's palm in the right hand, an arrow in the left hand.

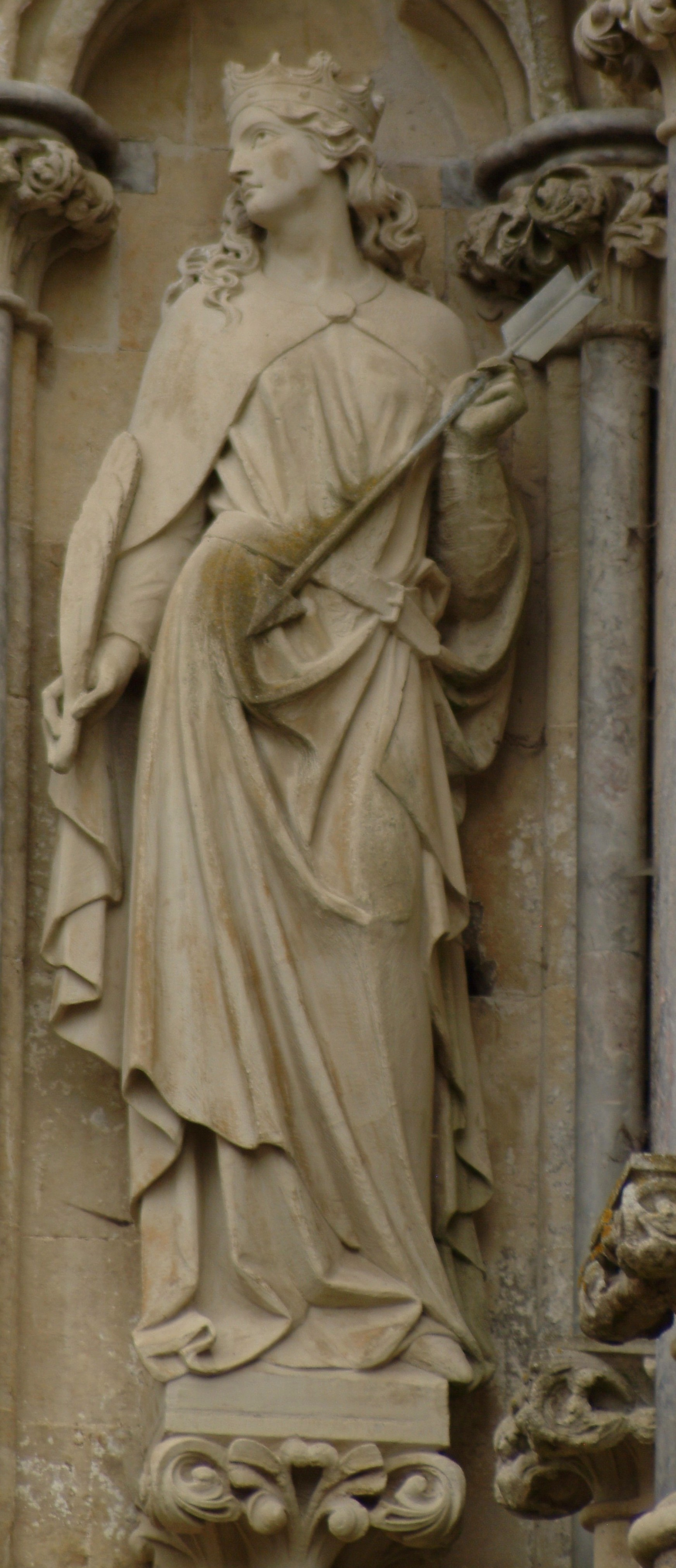
St Ursula

145
St John the Baptist
Early 14th century
Anon
Supporting an agnus dei roundel on right hand, wearing an animal skin. Badly weathered.

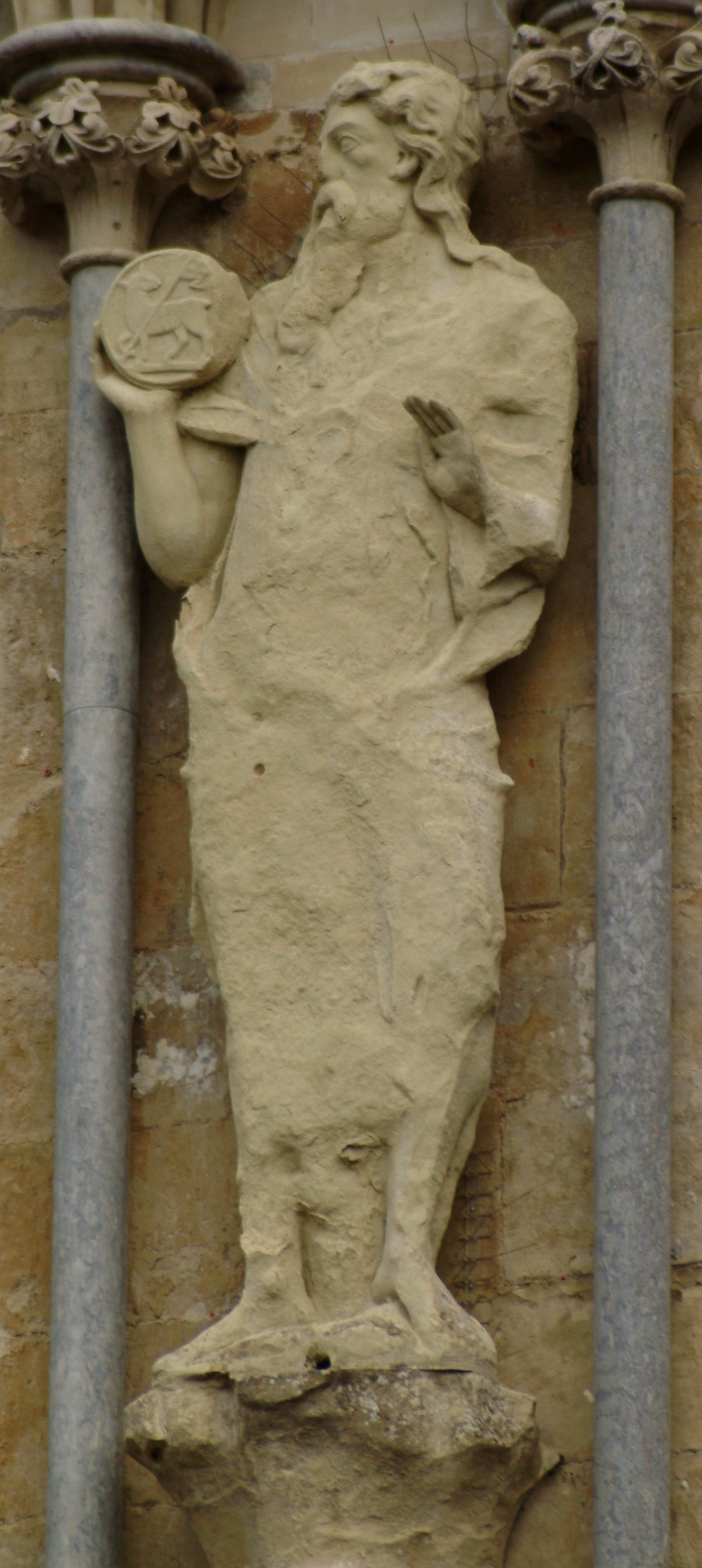
St John the Baptist

150
St Stephen
1869–70
James Redfern
Remains of a martyr's palm in left hand, some stones in right hand.

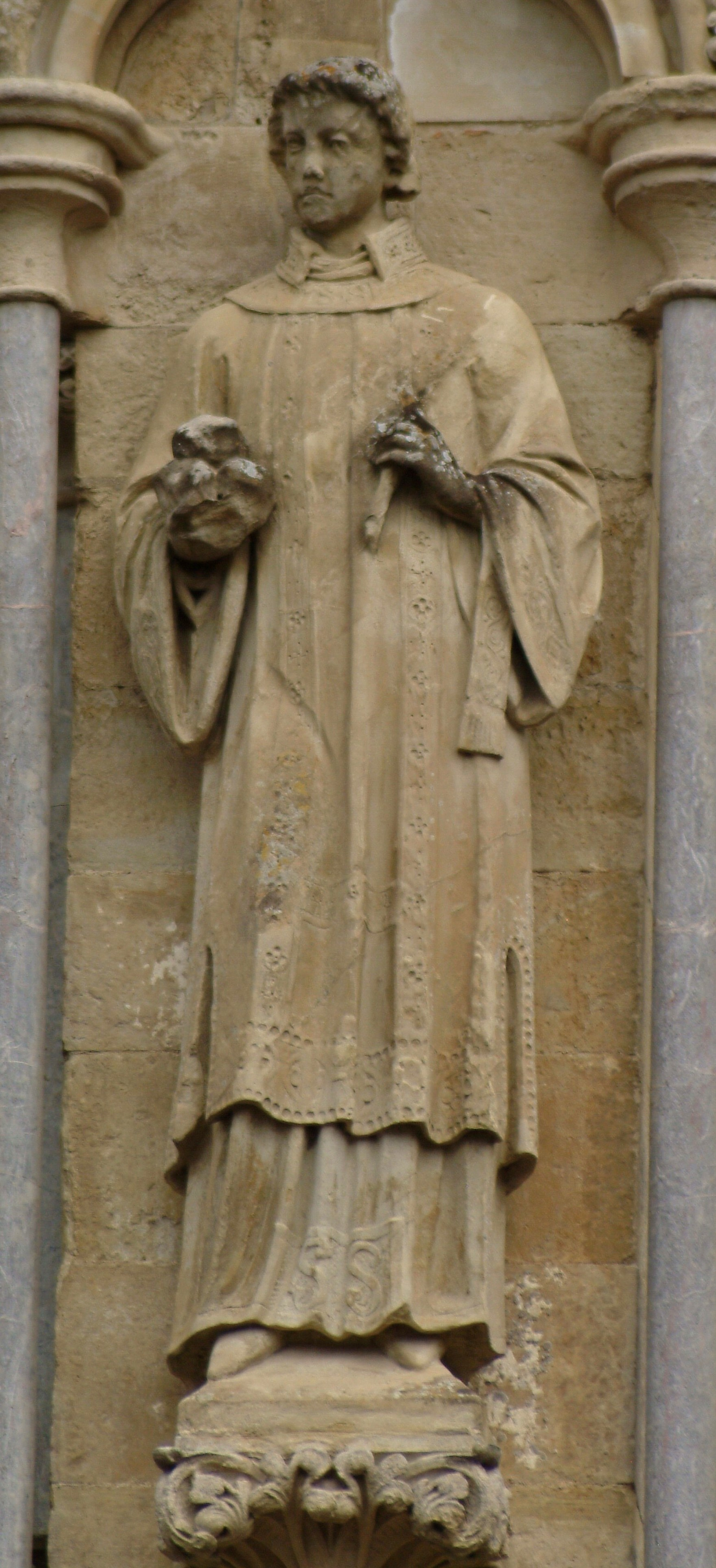
St Stephen

152
St Lucy
1867–69
James Redfern
A lamp in the right hand, a dagger in the left hand.

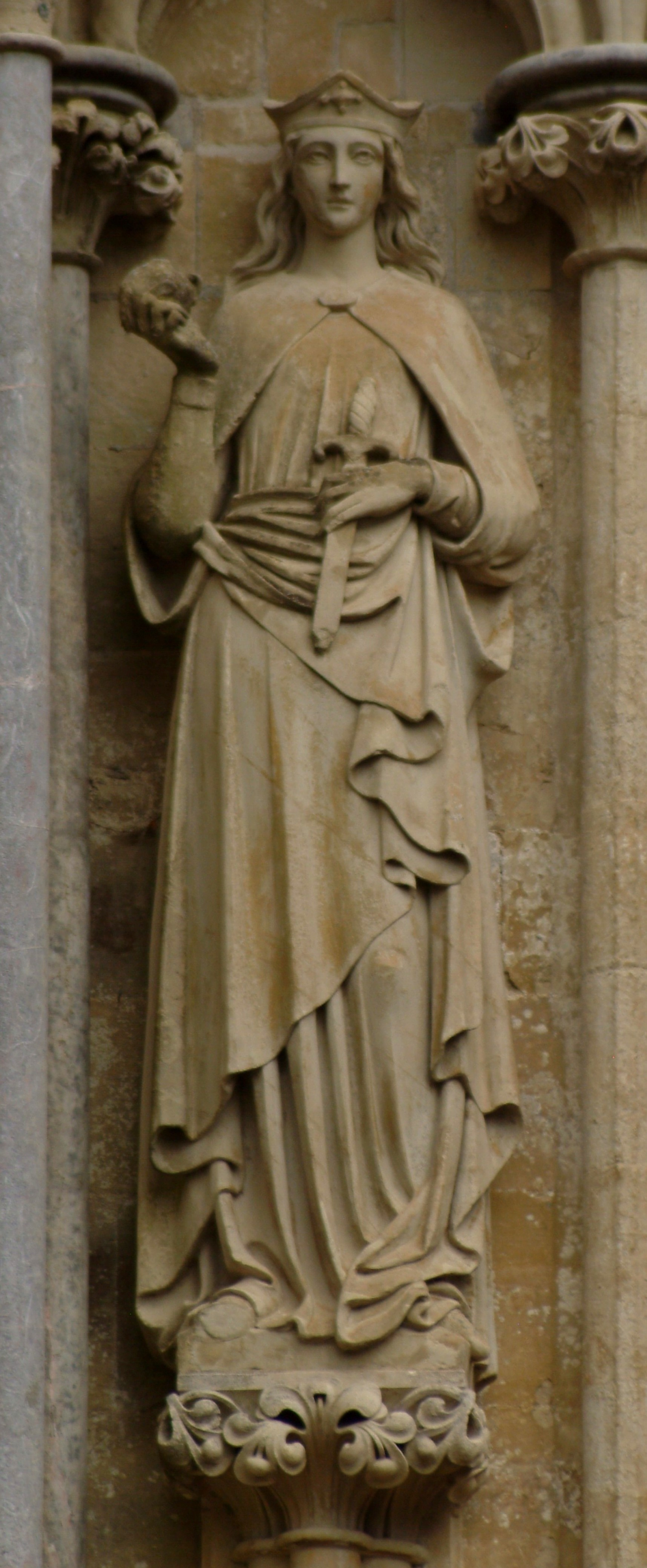
St Lucy

153
St Agatha
1867–69
James Redfern
Right hand holding a pair of tongs, left hand on her chest.

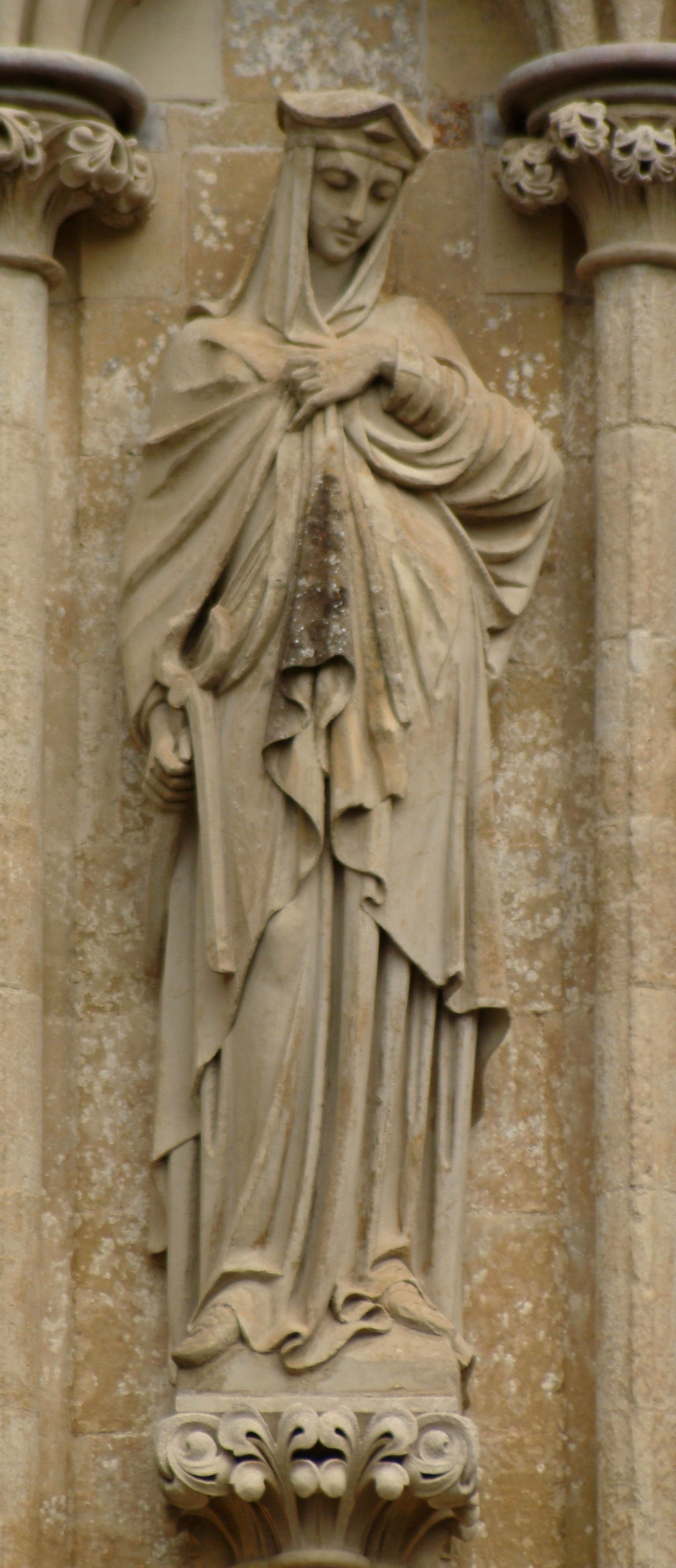
St Agatha

154
St Agnes
1867–69
James Redfern
Right hand supporting a lamb, left hand resting on lamb.

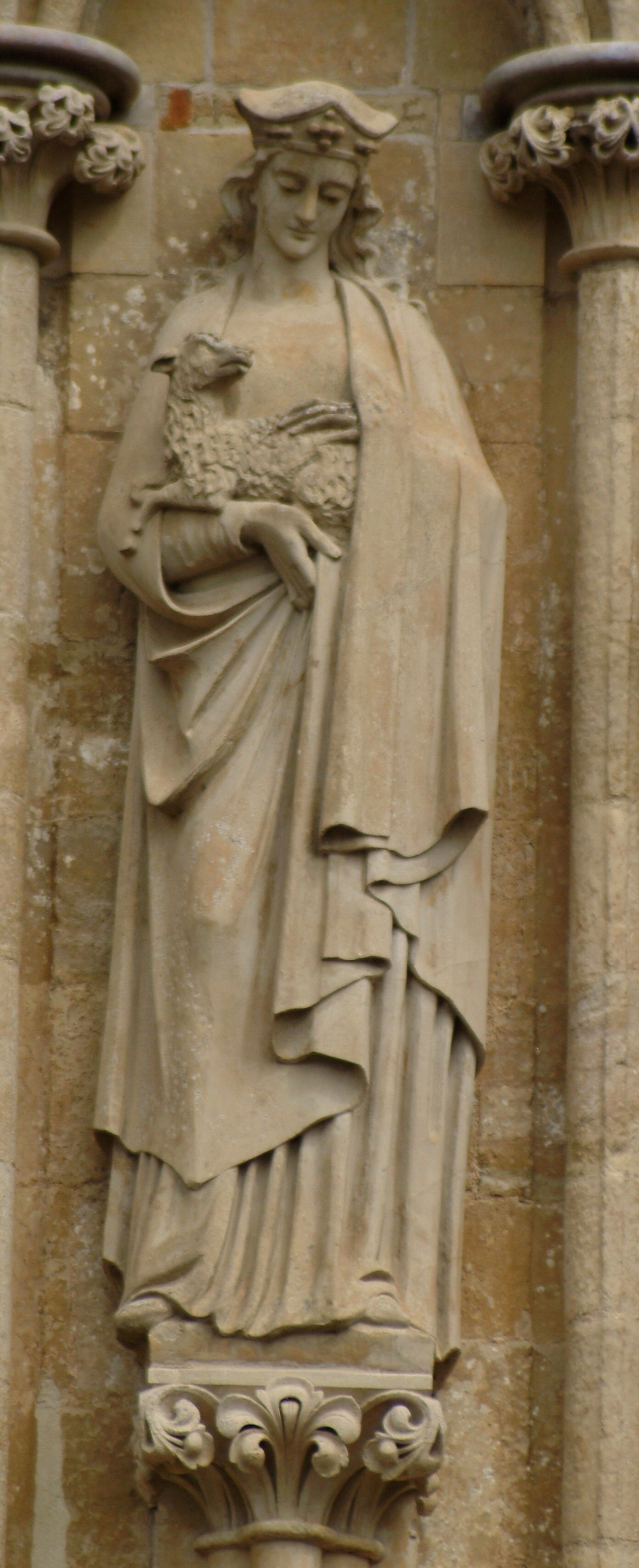
St Agnes

155
St Cecilia
1867–69
James Redfern
Looking upwards, supporting a portable organ, a plait of hair on the left shoulder.

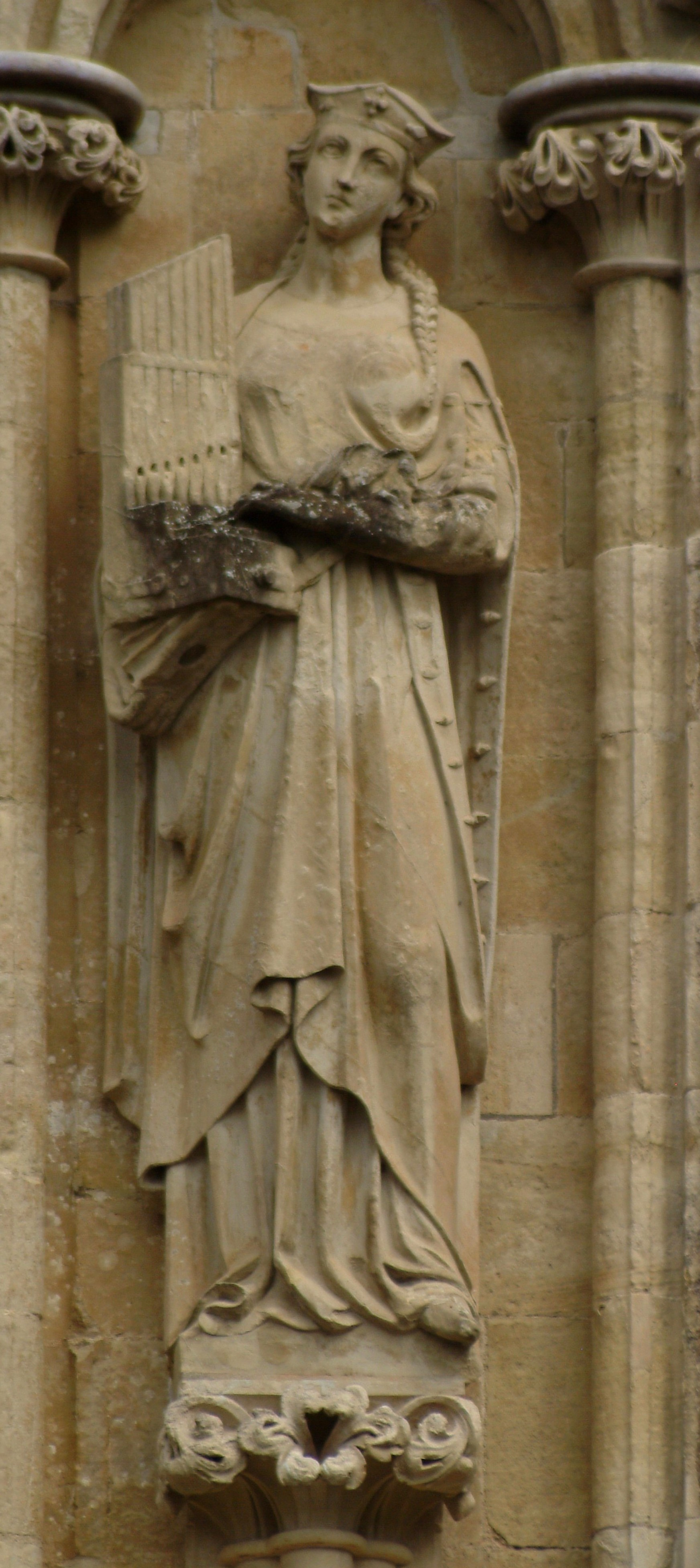
St Cecilia

=== Tier 6: Worthies belonging to the English Church, many with a local connection ===
166
Deacon Martyr, ?St Birinus
Early 14th century
Anon: Head by Redfern
On north face, both lower arms missing. Badly weathered.

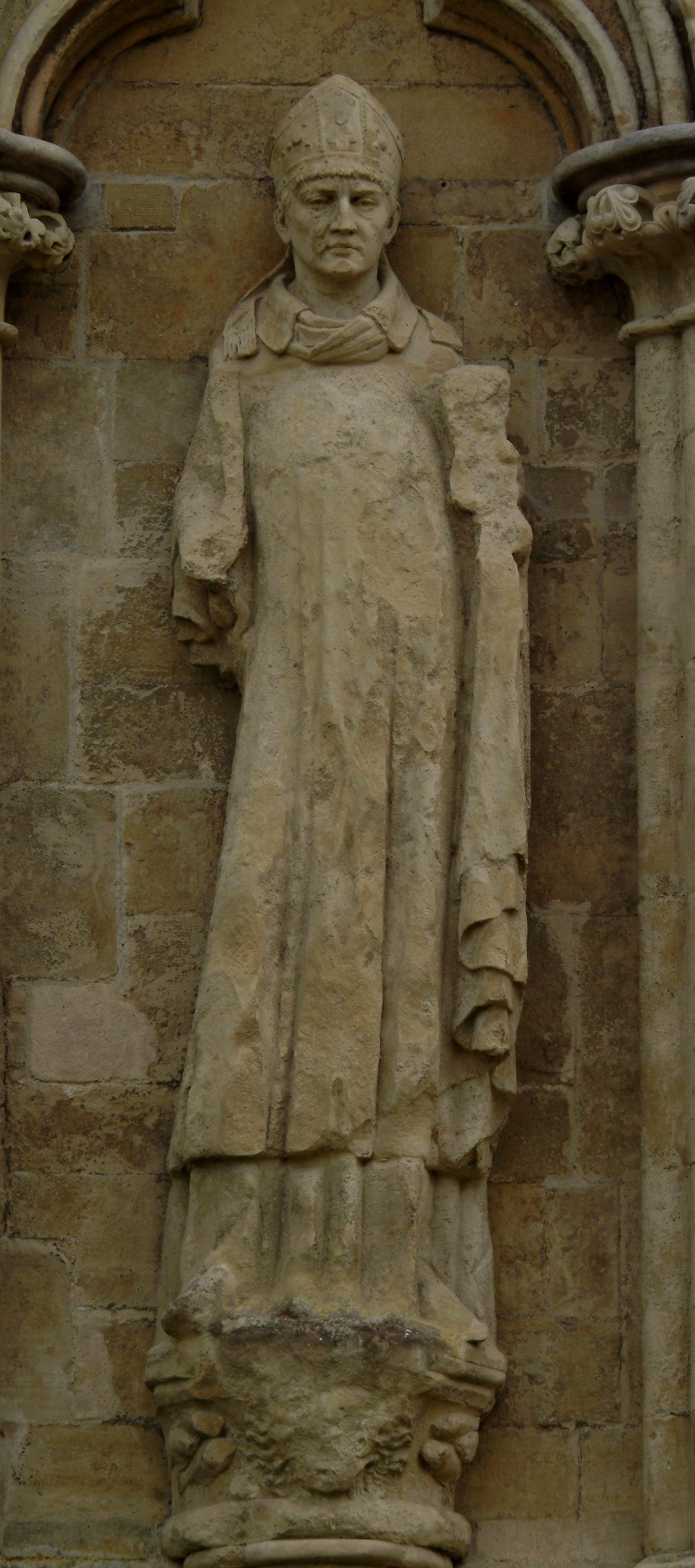
?St Birinus

167
St Etheldreda
After 1869
James Redfern
On north face. Holding model church on right arm, staff in left hand.

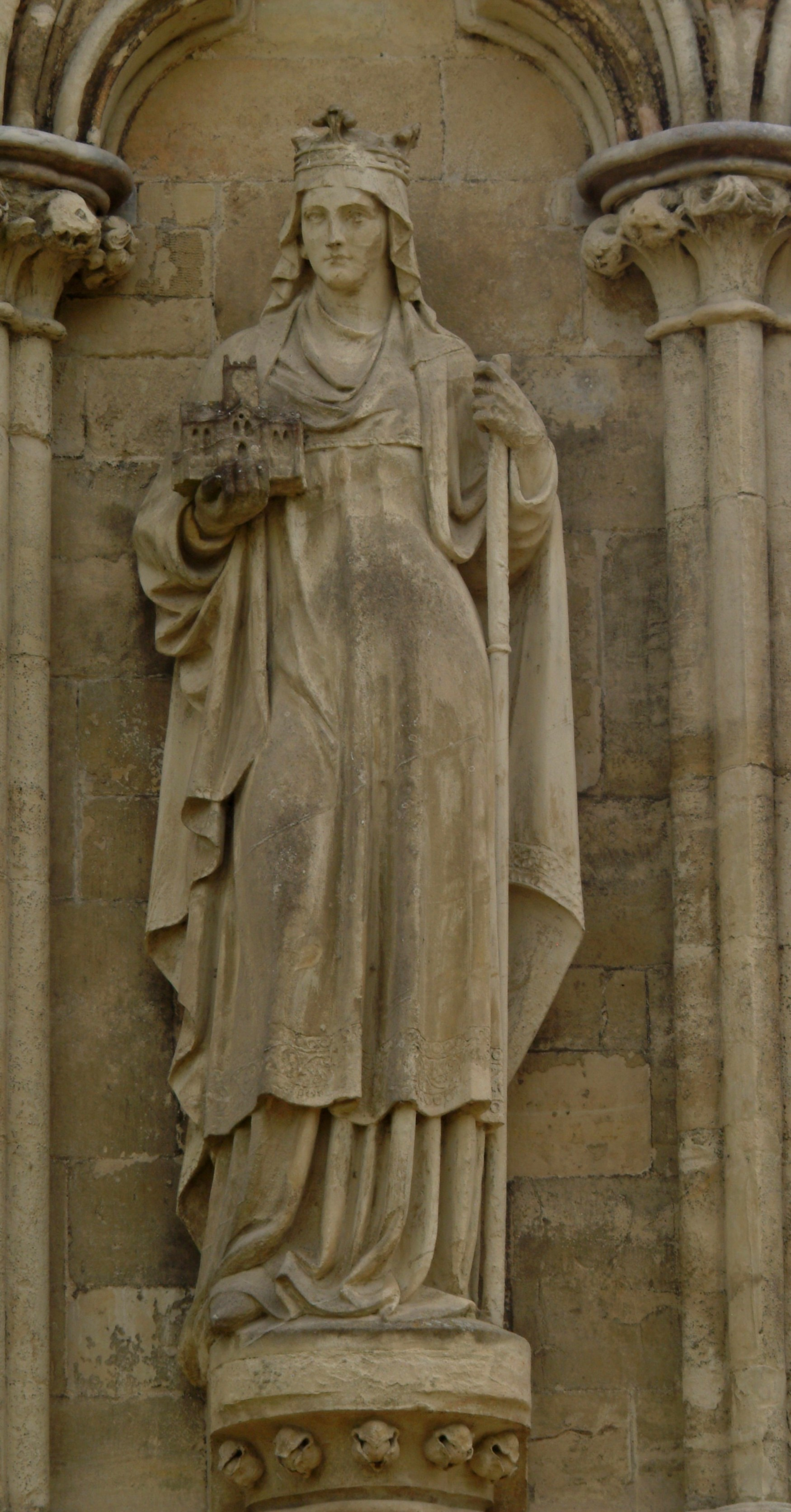
St Etheldreda

168
King Henry VI
?Early 20th century
Anon
On north face. Fleur-de-lis sceptre in right hand, orb in left hand.

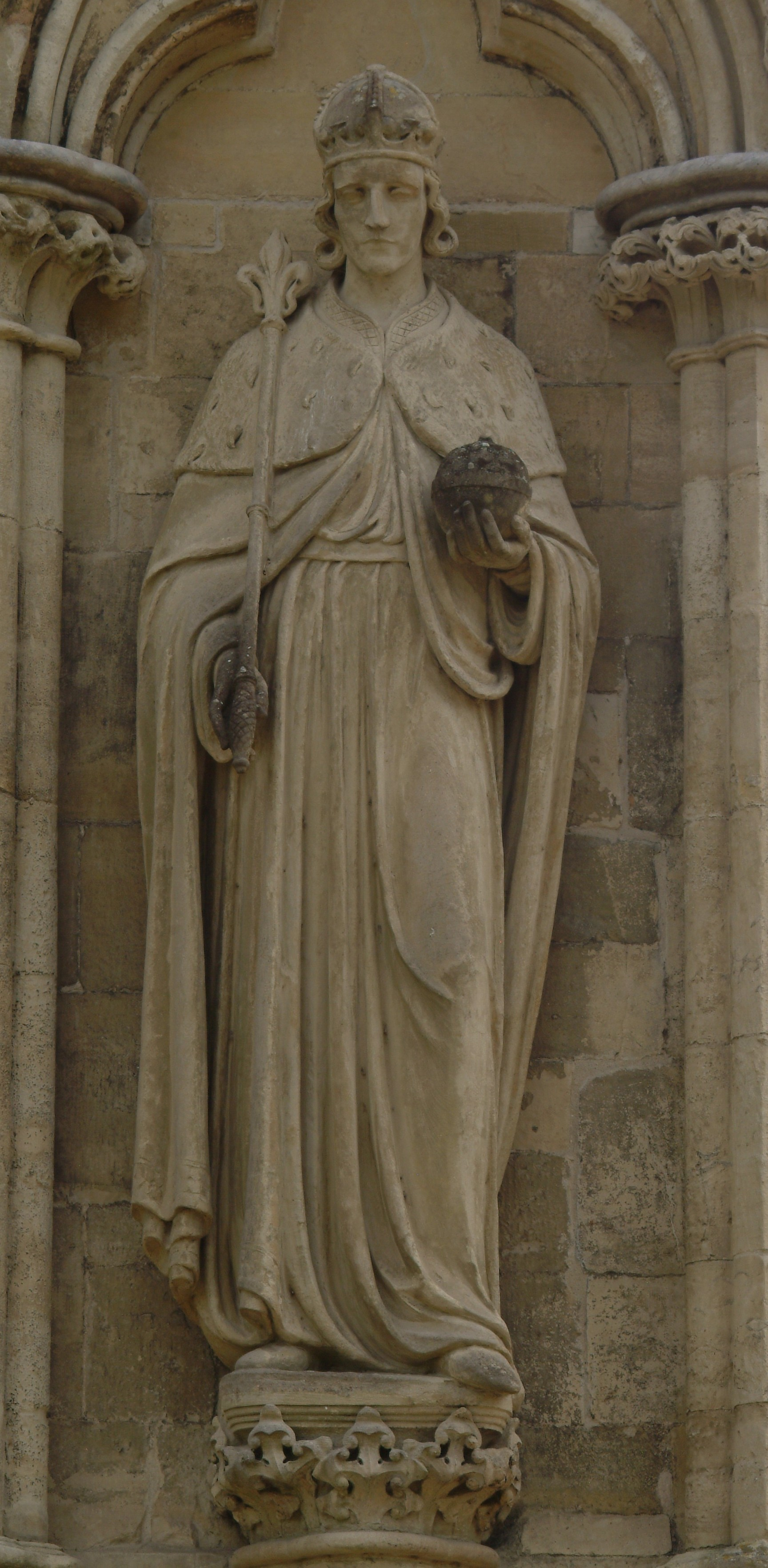
King Henry VI

169
Bishop Bridport
Mid-14th century
Anon
Hands missing, left arm supporting a staff.

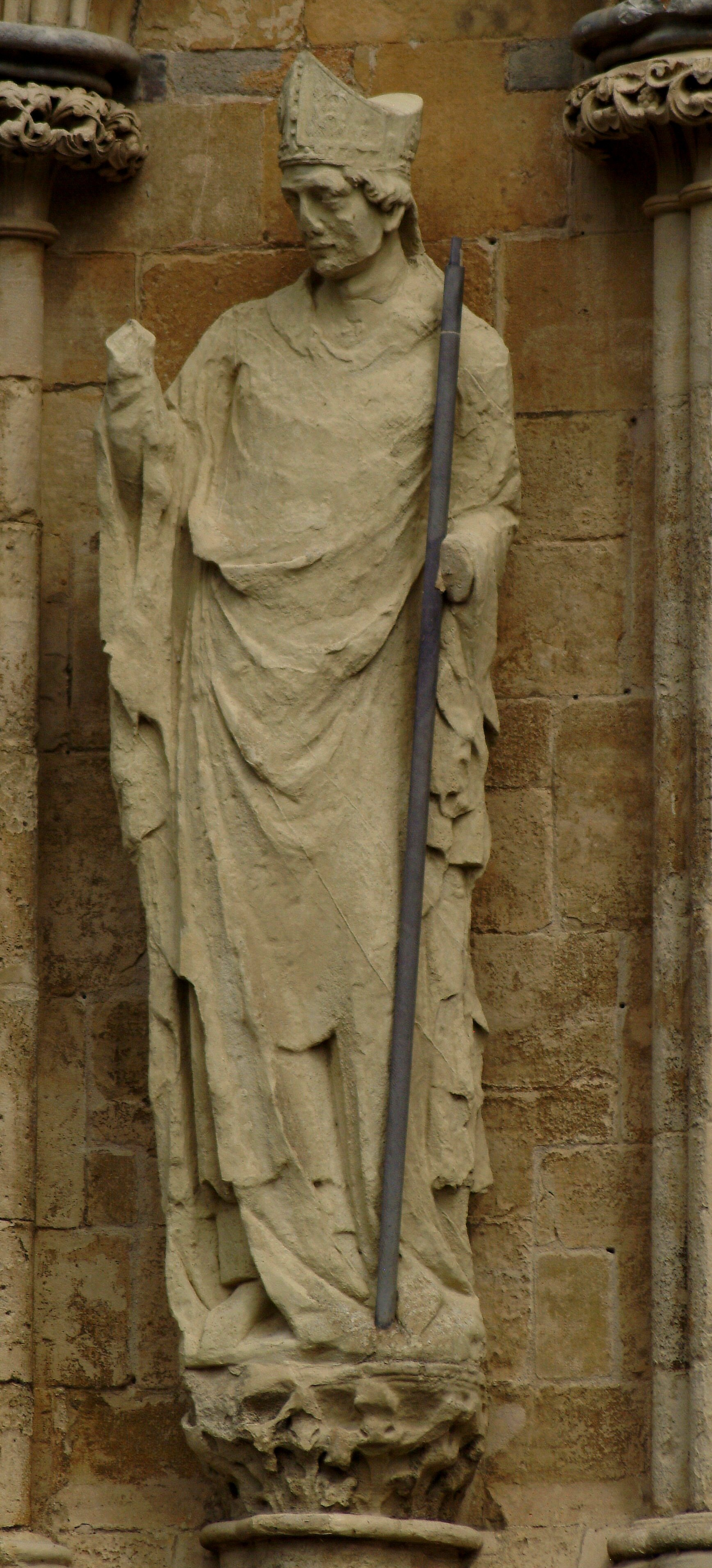
Bishop Bridport

170
Bishop Poore
1868–69
James Redfern
Right arm supporting a model of Salisbury Cathedral, left hand holding a short staff.

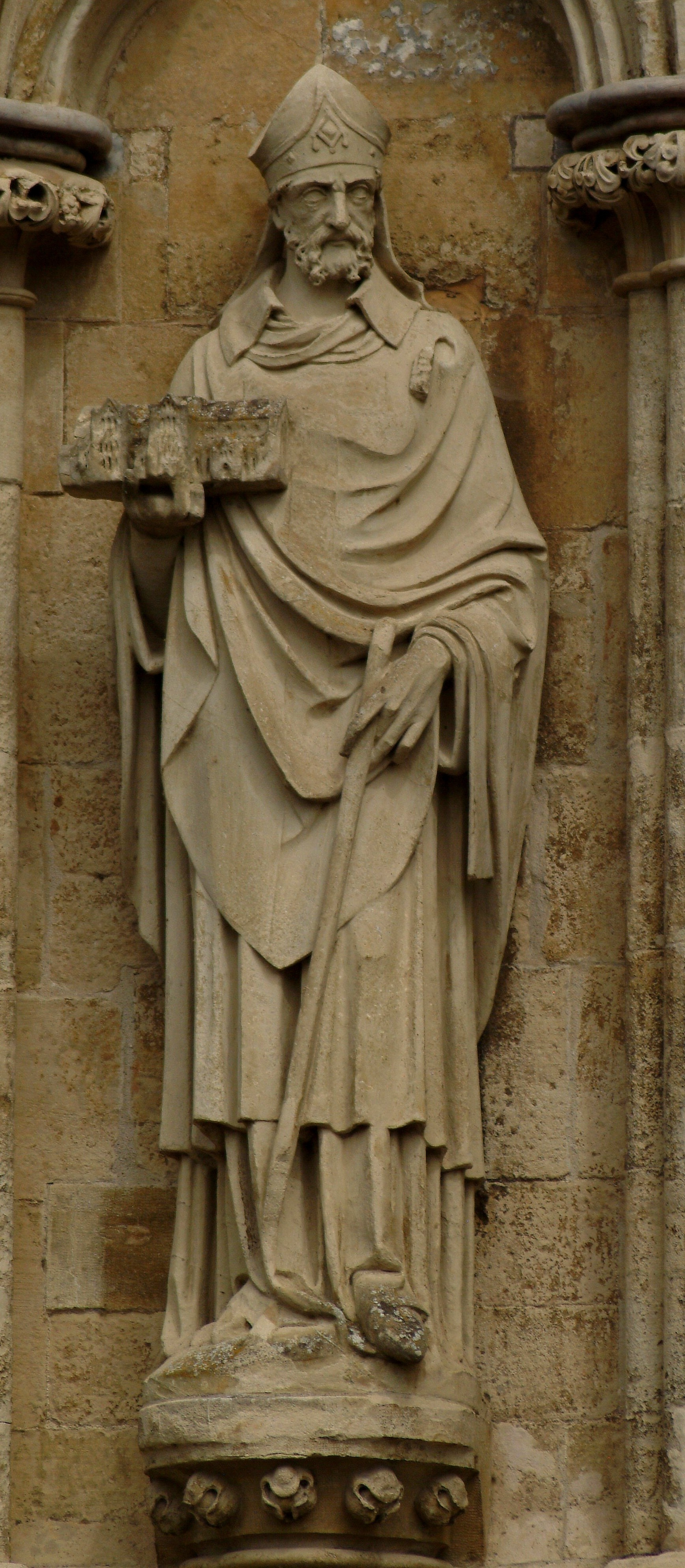
Bishop Poore

171
King Henry III
1868–69
James Redfern
Right hand holding a headless sceptre, left hand missing.

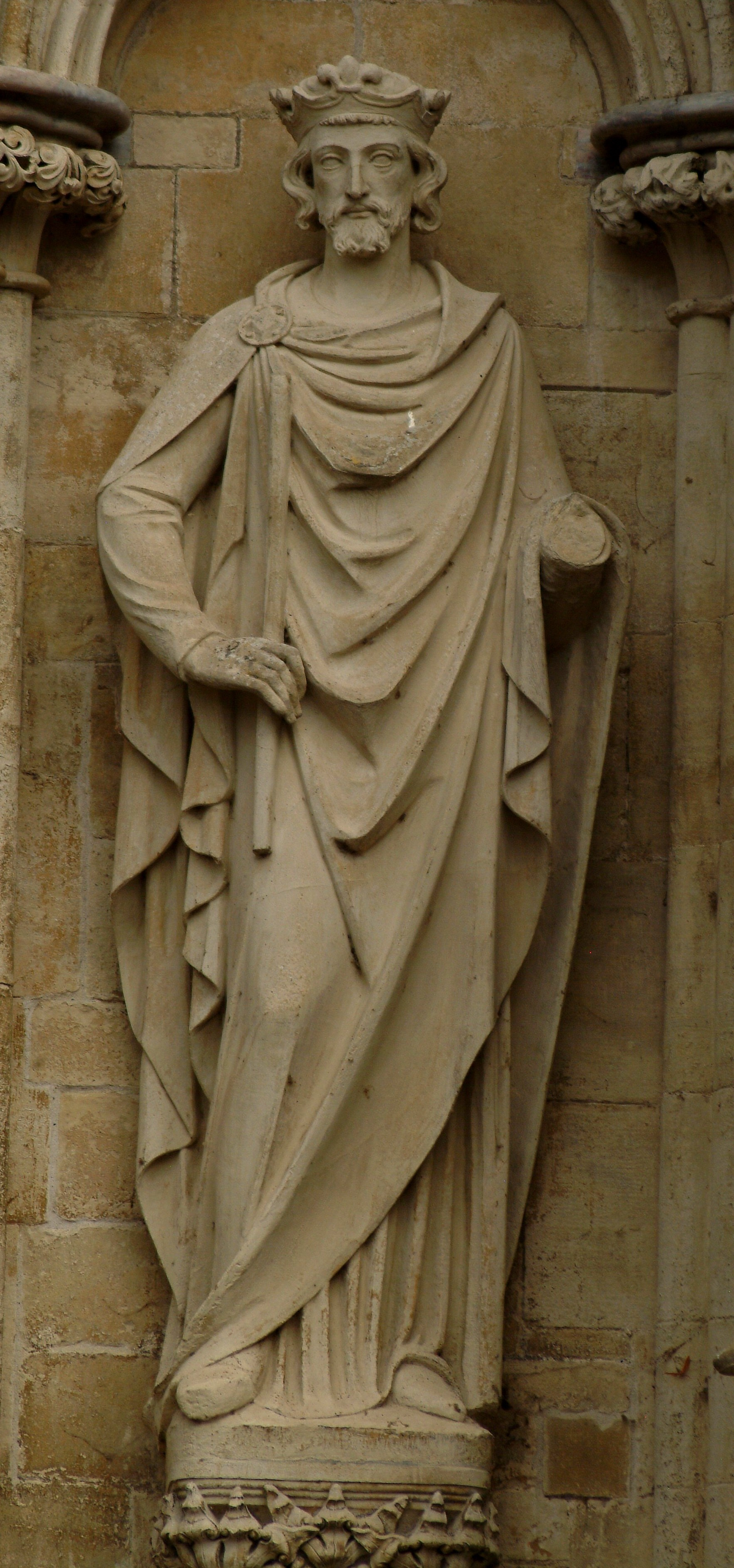
King Henry III

172
St Edmund of Canterbury
Early 20th century
Anon
Right hand raised in benediction, left hand holding a staff. Name on plinth.

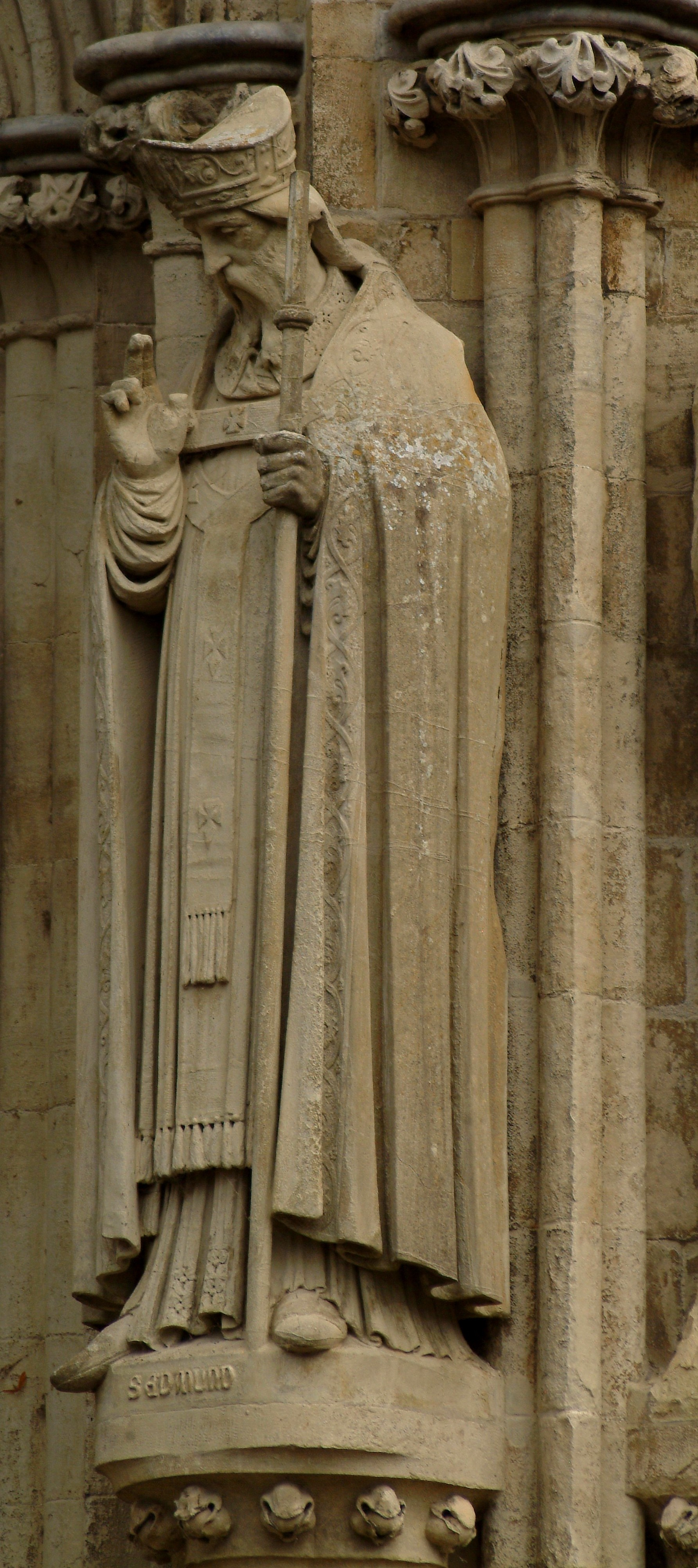
St Edmund of Canterbury

173
Bishop Odo of Ramsbury
1867
James Redfern
Right hand raised, fingers missing. Left hand holding chalice with wafer showing.

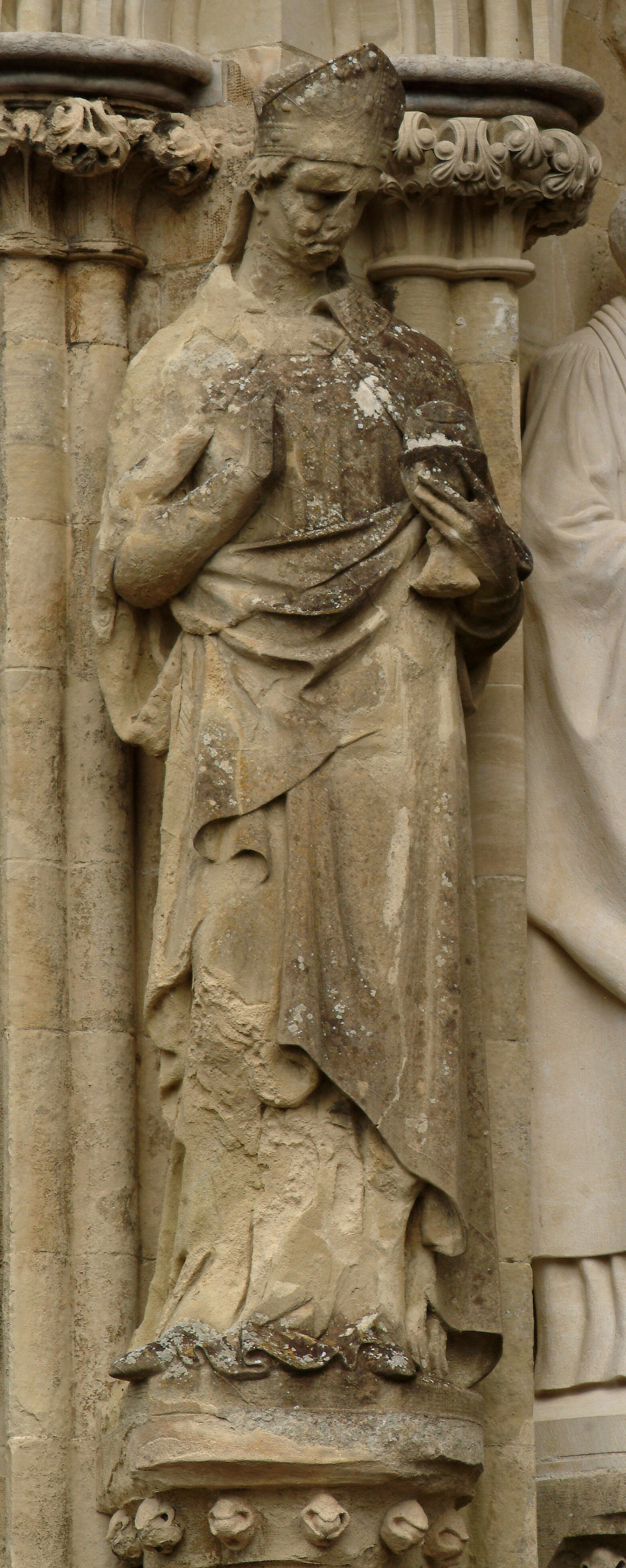
Bishop Odo of Ramsbury

174
Canon Ezra Baya Lawiri
2008
Jason Battle,
Pen in right hand, book in left hand.

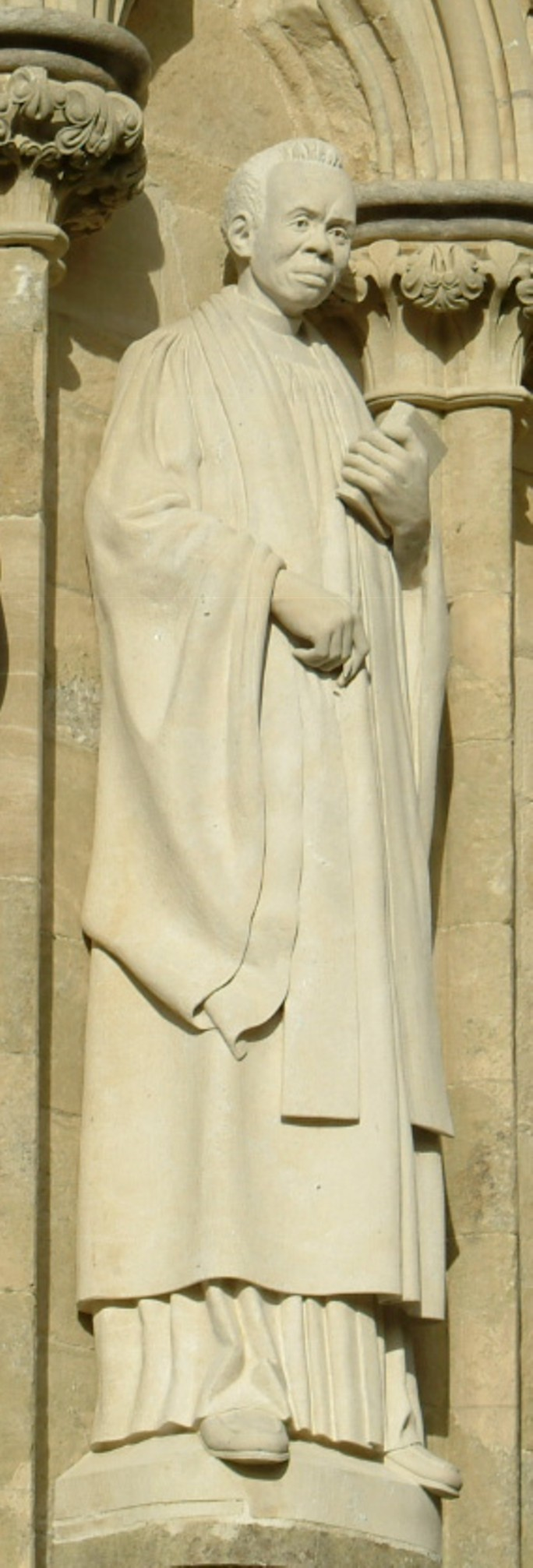
Ezra Baya Lawiri

177
Bishop Ken
c. 1930–31
Allan G. Wyon
Right hand raised in benediction. Left hand holding a tall crozier.

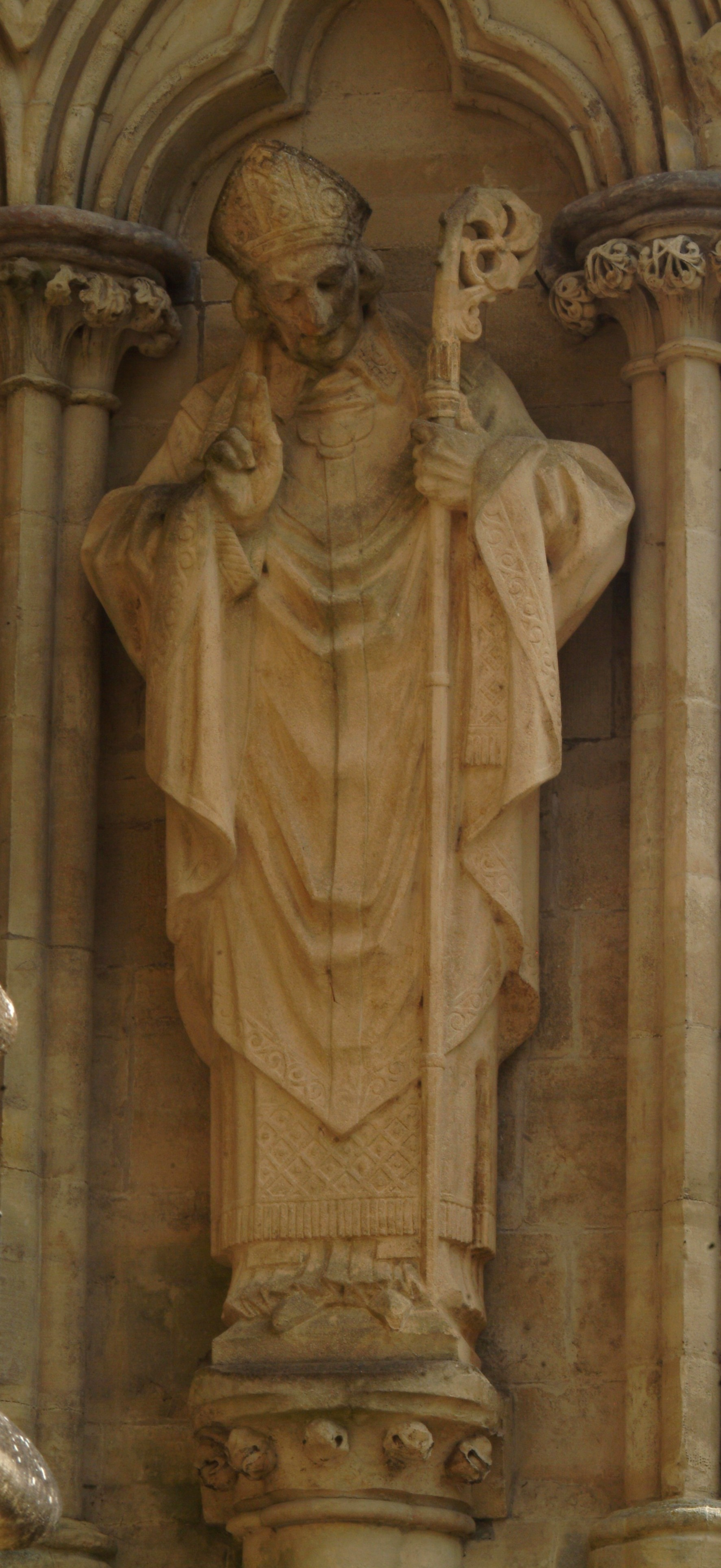
Bishop Ken

178
St. Osmund
?1878
James Redfern
Right hand holding two books. Left hand holding a staff.

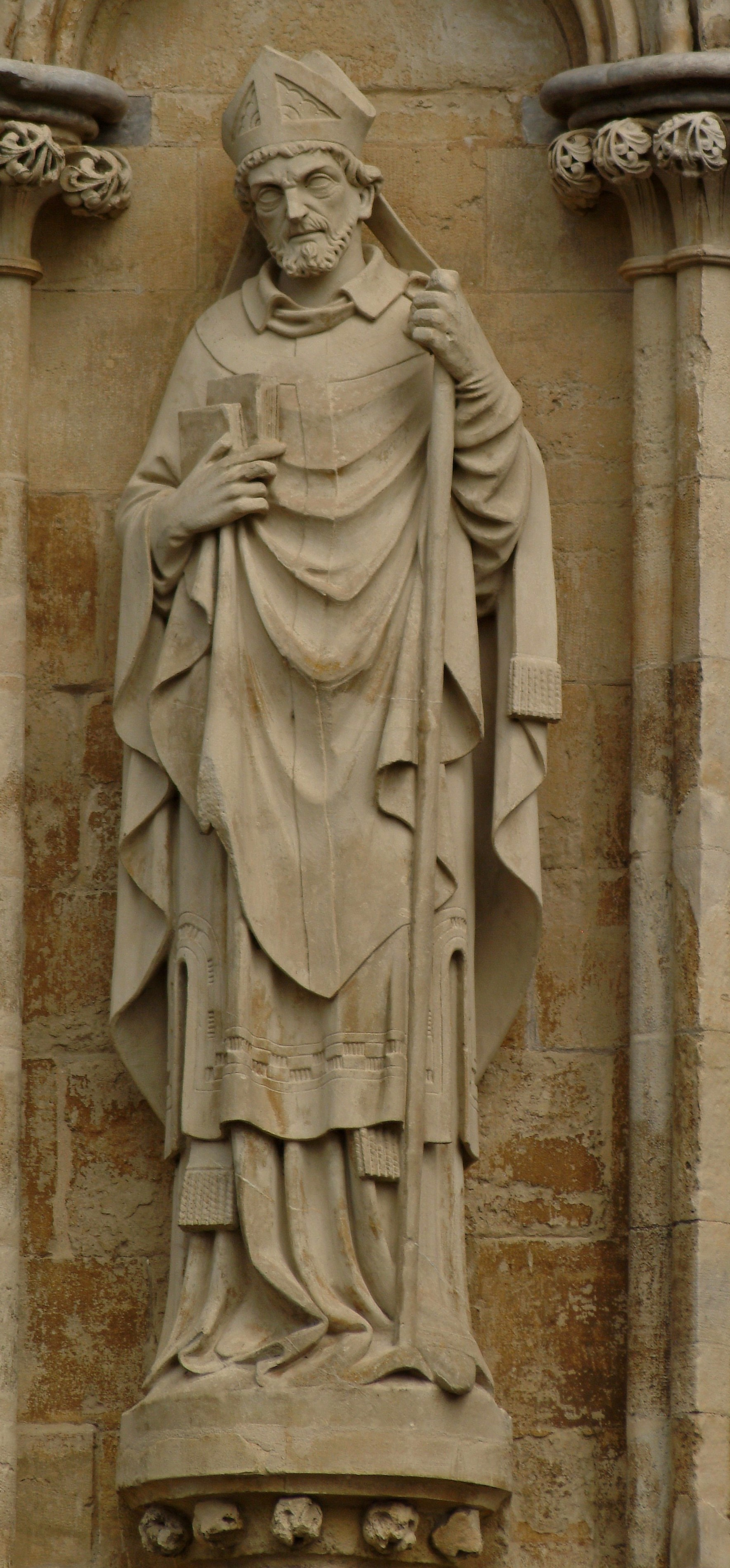
St Osmund

180
Angel of the Annunciation, Archangel Gabriel
1870
James Redfern
Holding some ?lilies in left hand, right hand raised in benediction.

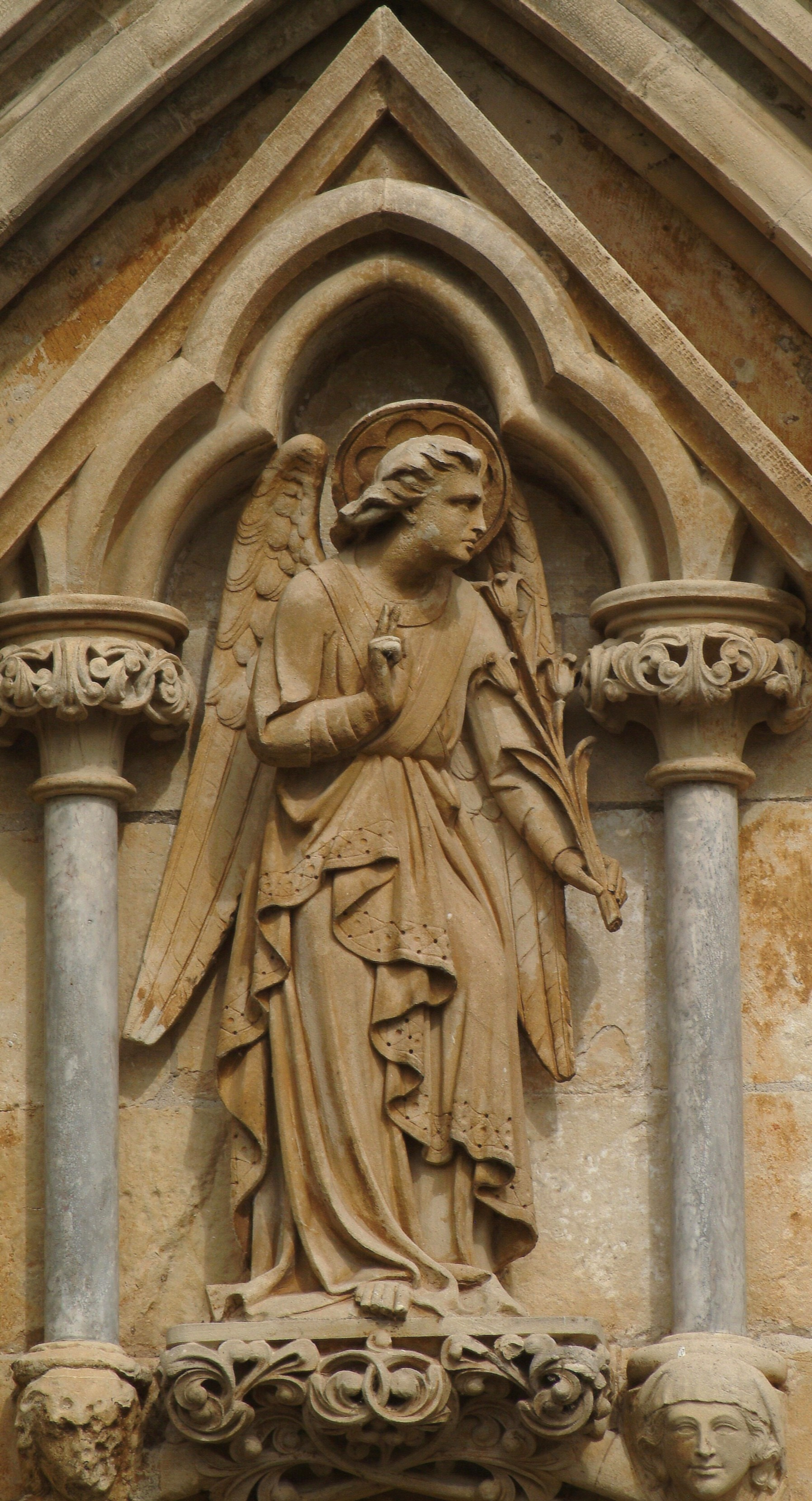
Angel of the Annunciation

181
Standing Virgin Mary
1870
James Redfern
With a nimbus, missing right hand, remains of lilies on right shoulder. Left hand on chest.

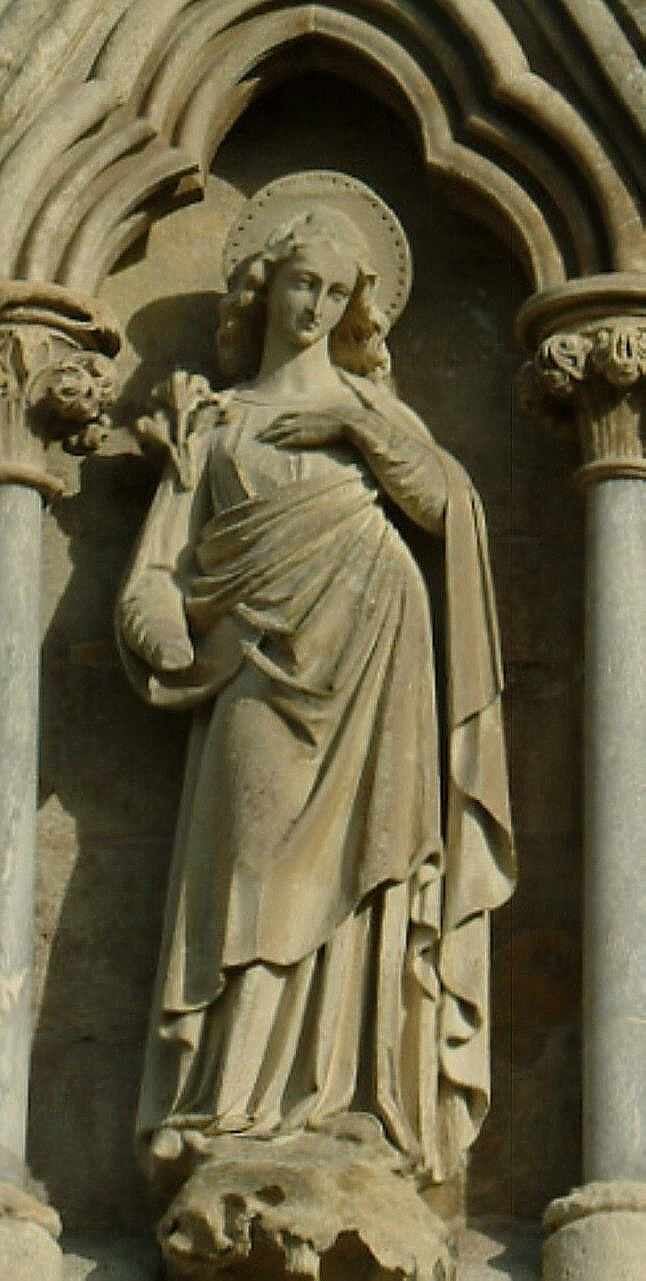
Virgin Mary

182
Virgin of the Annunciation
1870
James Redfern
Sitting in profile, with a nimbus, holding a book.

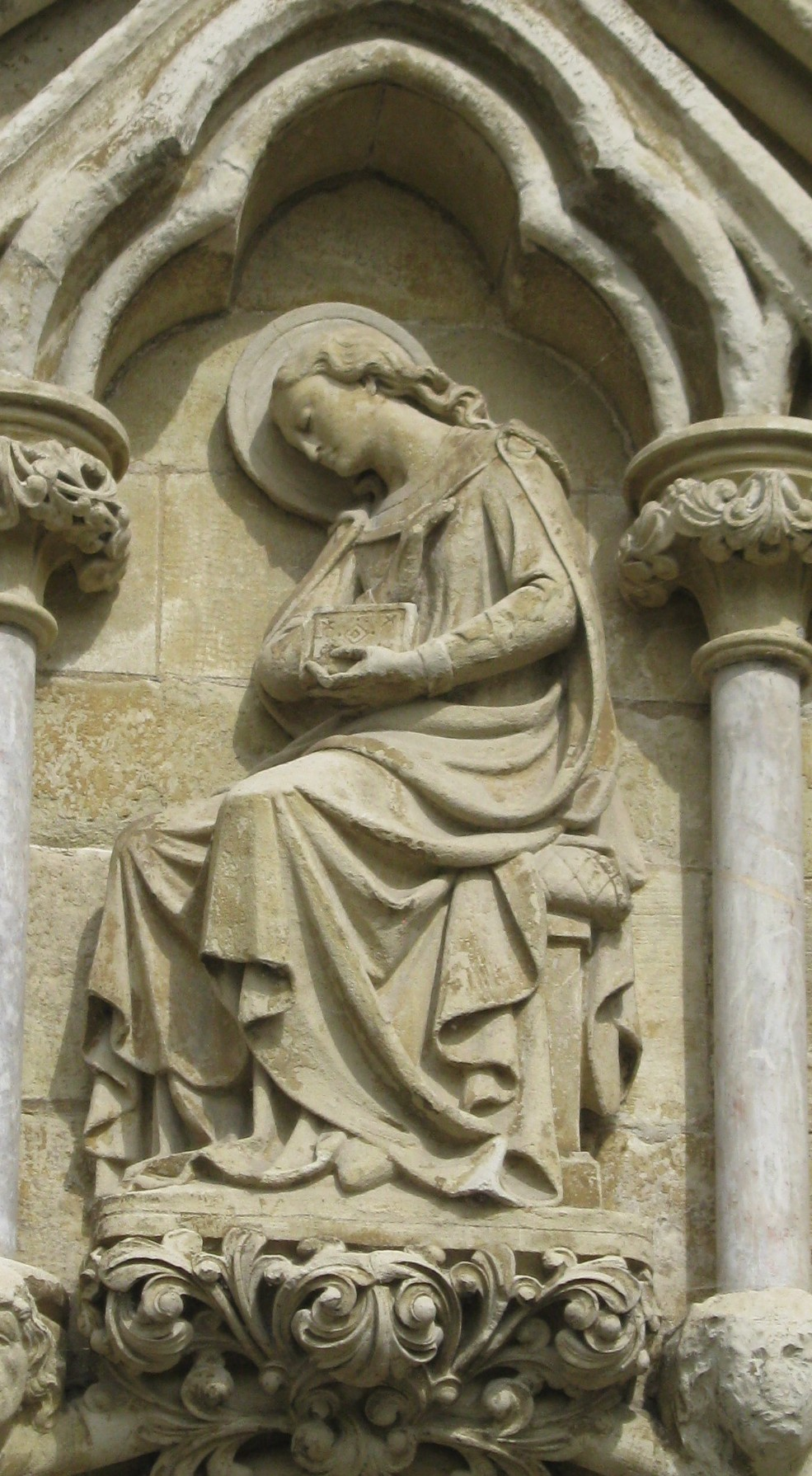
Virgin of the Annunciation

183
Censing Angel
1870
James Redfern
Inside main porch. Right profile holding a censer and chains.

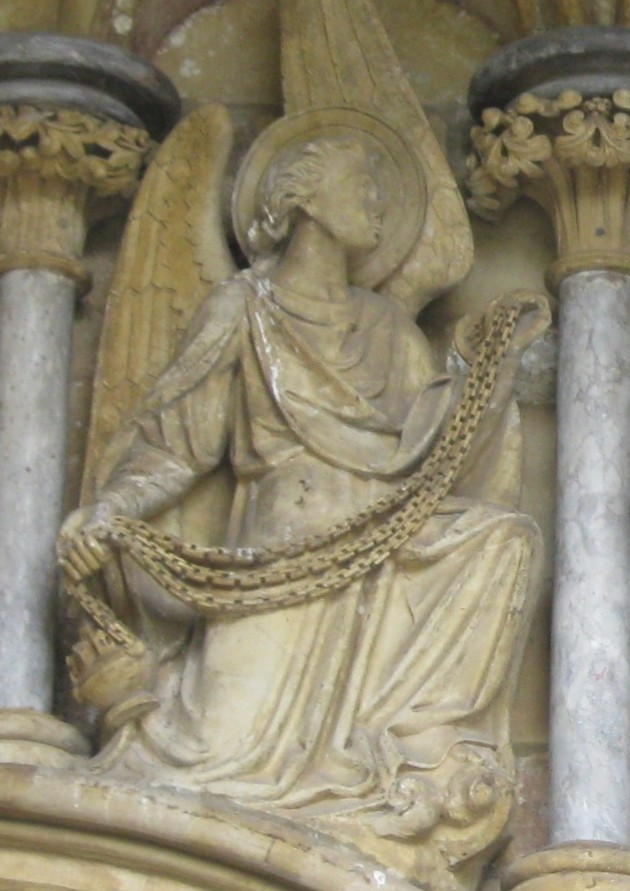
Censing angel

184
Virgin and Child
1870
James Redfern
Inside main porch.

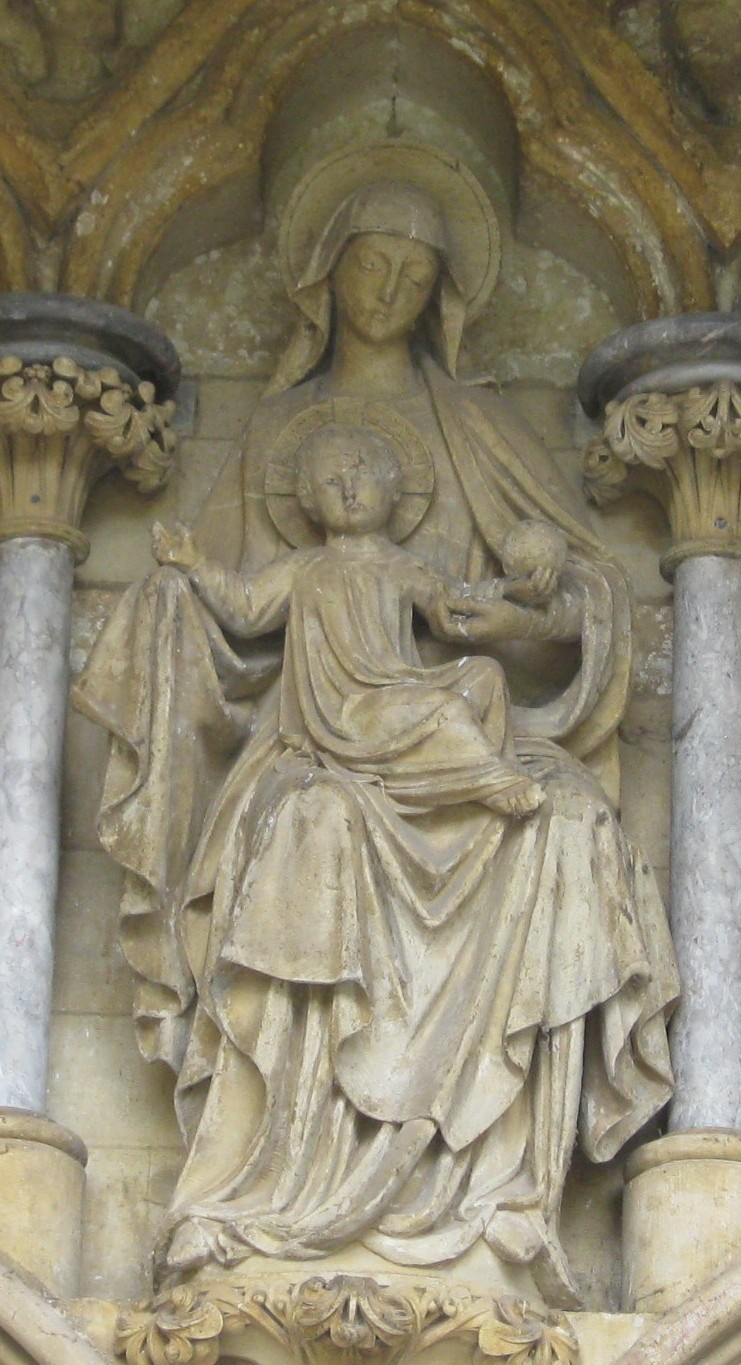
Virgin and Child

185
Censing Angel
1870
James Redfern
Inside main porch. Left profile holding censer and chains.

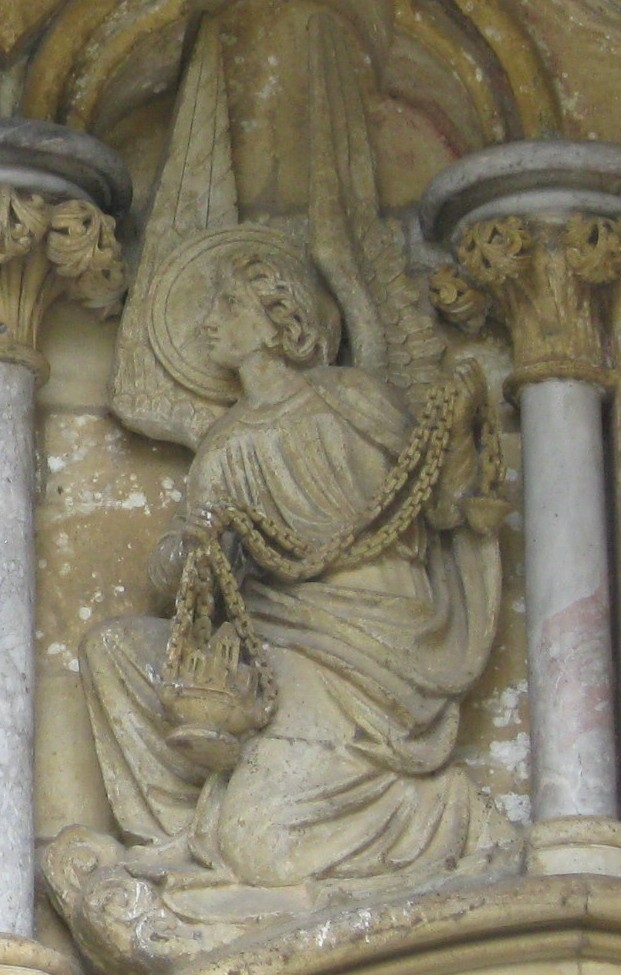
Censing Angel

187
Bishop Brithwold
?1868
James Redfern
Right hand missing. Remains of left hand holding remnants of a crozier

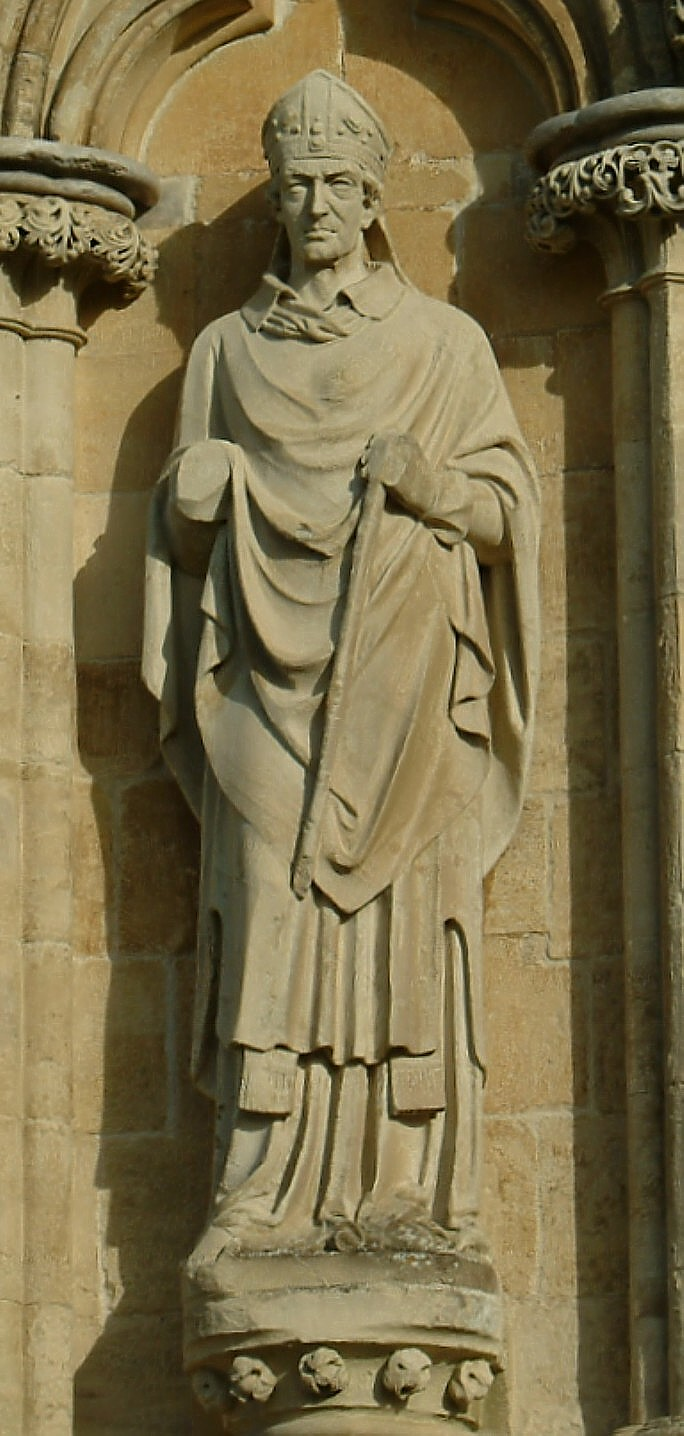
Bishop Brithwold

188
Rev. George Herbert
2000
Jason Battle
Hands across chest, looking down.

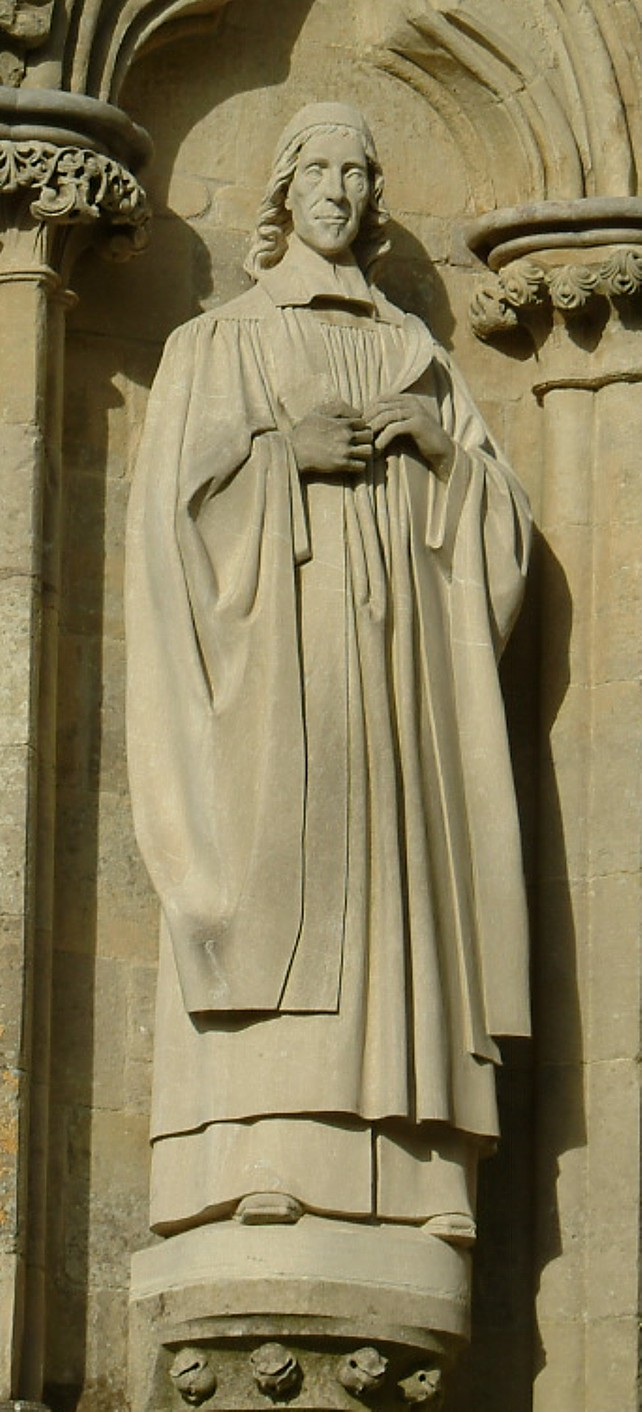
George Herbert

192
St Alban
1867–69
James Redfern
Right hand missing. Left hand missing. Left arm supporting a sceptre. Large damaged area from midriff to left foot.

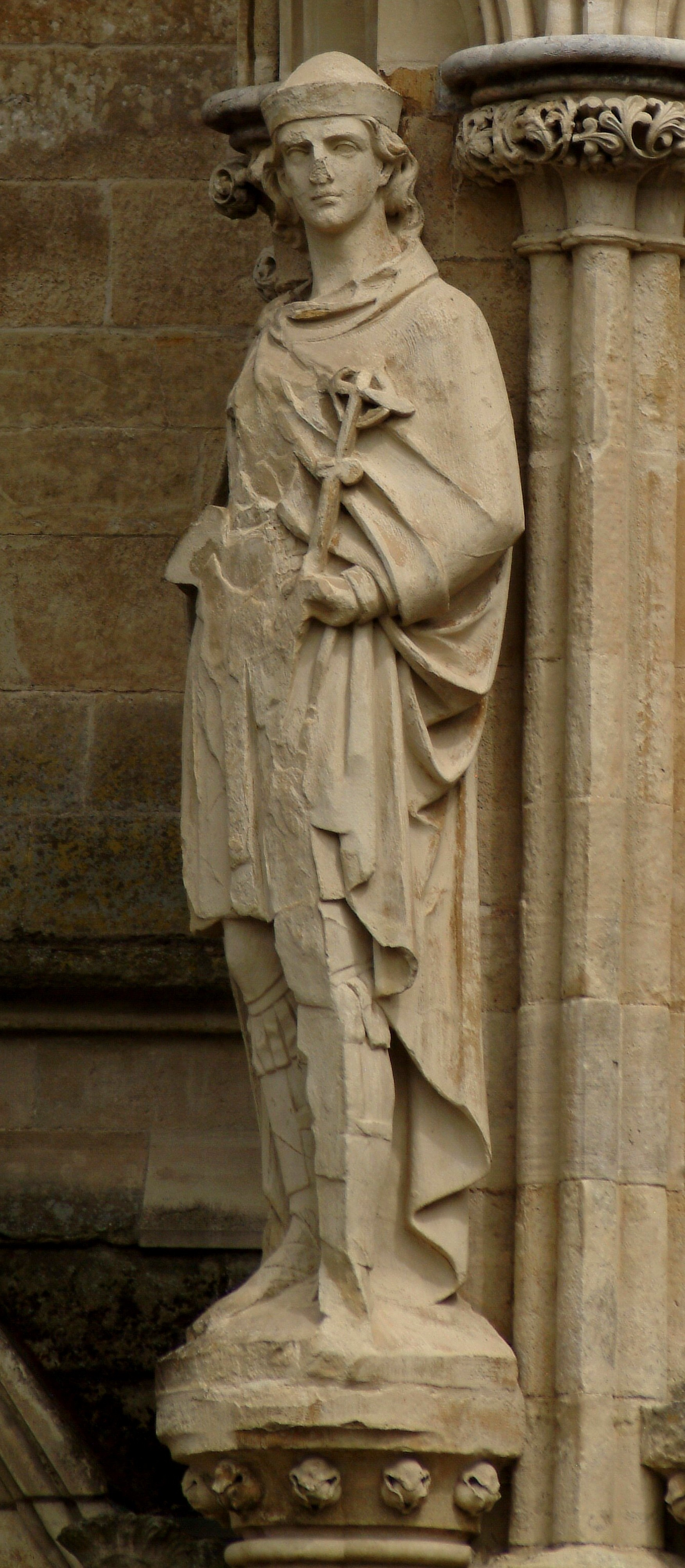
St Alban

194
St Alphege
1867–69
James Redfern
Clothing lifted to support stones. Stone on right shoulder and on right side of mitre.

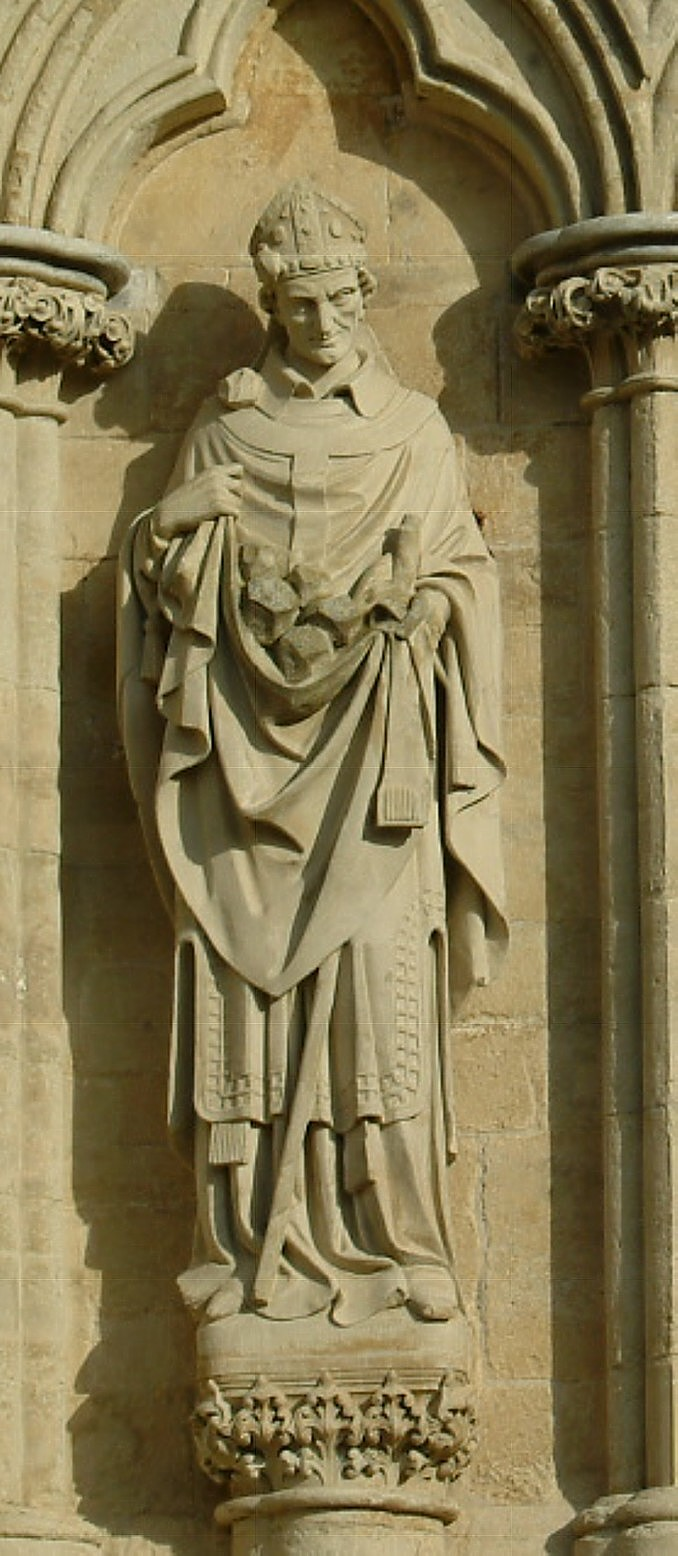
St. Alphege

195
St Edmund the Martyr
1867–69
James Redfern
Right hand holding clothes at chest. Dagger in left side of chest.

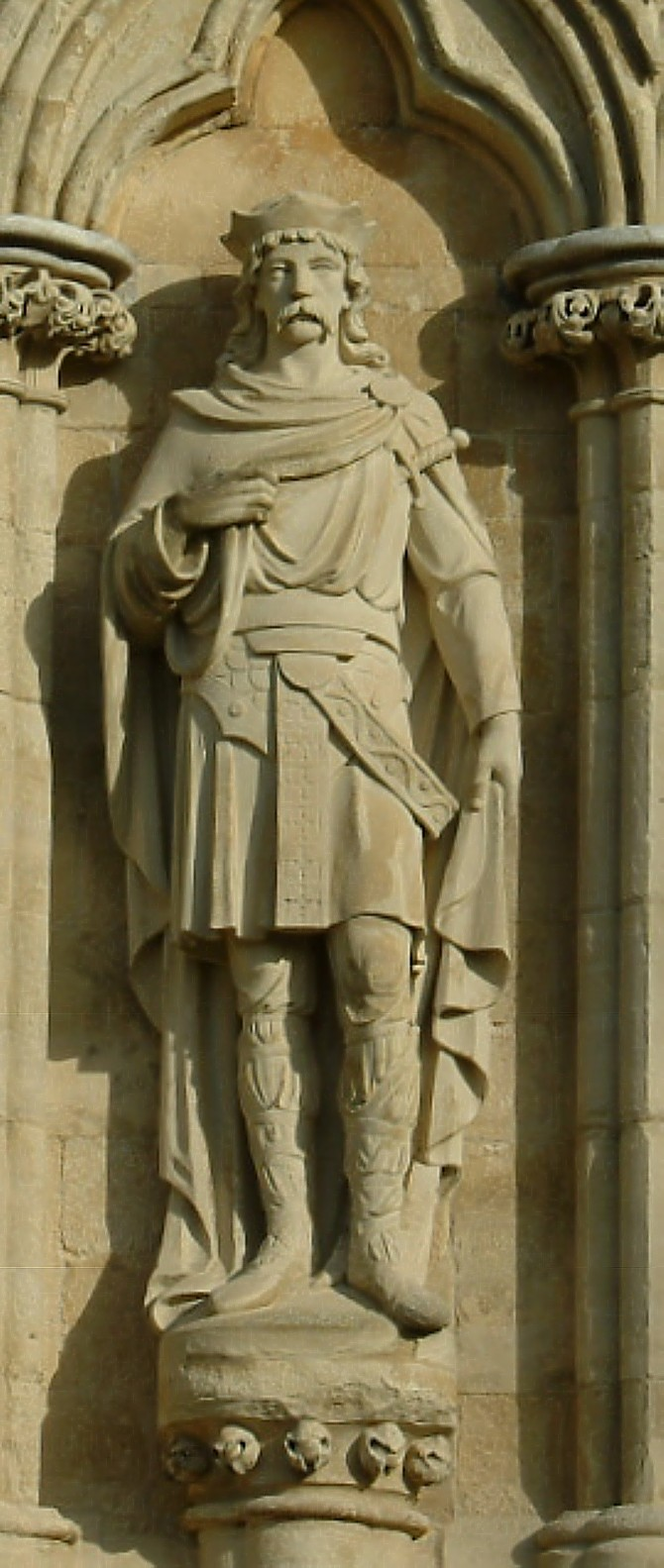
St. Edmund the Martyr

196
St Thomas of Canterbury
1867–69
James Redfern
Damaged right hand raised in benediction. Left hand holding a staff. (Damaged) dagger through skull from right.

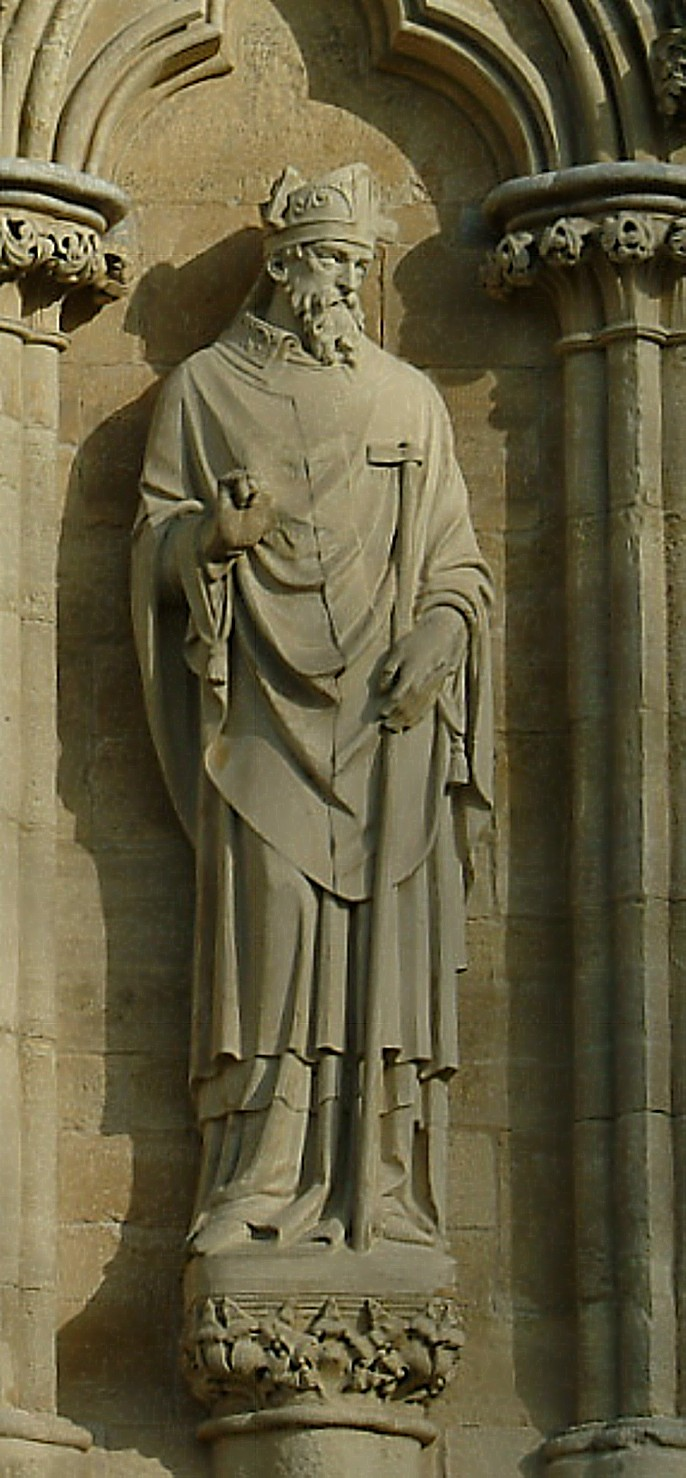
St. Thomas of Canterbury
