= Geoffrey de Runcey =

English chronicler

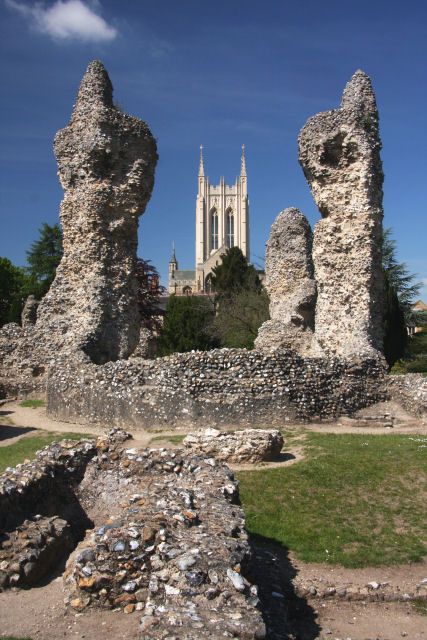
The ruins of Bury St Edmunds Abbey in Suffolk, where de Runcey spent much of his life.

Geoffrey de Runcey (1340s?–1384) was a 14th century chronicler and abbey servant who wrote a valuable, although now-incomplete journal of his travels around medieval East Anglia.

Little is known about de Runcey's ancestry, but his name suggests that he originated from North Runcton, now in the town of King's Lynn in Norfolk, "Runcey" being an archaic spelling (see also Oxburgh Hall at Oxborough). It has been speculated that he was the son of a landowner, free tenant, or even the illegitimate son of a priest, as despite not being ordained he was educated at Bury St. Edmunds Abbey and was in service with the monastery for the rest of his life.

He is best known for his Chronicle from circa 1379. De Runcey appears to have been sent by the priory to spread the news of the death of the high abbot of Bury around the Benedictine monasteries of East Anglia, in the process coming into contact with many walks of life. The chronicle was likely to have been written as evidence that the task was accomplished. He died in 1384, although the cause of death is not recorded. He was interred at the priory of St Edmund, in Bury St. Edmunds, Suffolk, although his tomb was destroyed during the Dissolution of the Monasteries.

== The Chronicle ==
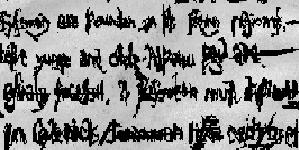
Portion of the chronicle manuscript.

The Chronicle is, unusually, written in late Middle English, although in a second version (B manuscript), de Runcey or another hand appears to have (poorly) translated sections into Latin for the newly chosen abbot's reading. This version is of a more decorated nature. His journal has proved particularly useful for historians researching Fen customs before Cornelius Vermuyden's great drainage scheme of the 1630s, and is notable for its whimsical, yet unusually secular outlook and lack of superstition. In particular his vivid account of stilt walkers has provided the foundation for many histories of the area:

Stilltemen are yfounden inn the Fenn regionis…Althow theyye are usually triumfant, manny younge boyes are accustomed to falle manny tymes beforr theyye are trewly sucsesfull.

Much of his original journal has unfortunately been lost, although the remaining fragments are kept preserved at the Hillard Collection in Suffolk, the Wisbech Museum and a transcription into modern English of key parts of both manuscripts is available at the Chatteris Museum.

== See also ==
- Jocelyn de Brakelond, author of the Chronicle of the Abbey of St Edmunds c. 1173 1202
- John de Taxster, author of the Chronicle of Bury St Edmunds c. 1173–1265
- Chronica Johannis de Oxenedes, another chronicle written at St Benet's Abbey, Norfolk.
