= John of Eversden =

English chronicler and monk

John of Eversden or Everisden (fl. 1300) was an English chronicler.

== Life ==
John was presumably a native of one of the two villages of that name near Caxton, Cambridgeshire. He entered the Benedictine order, having been tonsured in 1255, and became a member of the Bury St Edmunds Abbey. He was cellarer there in 1300, when he made a "valida expedition" into Northamptonshire to carry out a claim of his monastery on the manor of Werketon (Warkton).

In the following year, 1 June, he is mentioned in a bull of Boniface VIII confirming the election of Abbot Thomas, and in January 1307 he attended the Parliament at Carlisle as proctor for his abbot. Nothing further is known of his life, and although for centuries he was remembered as a chronicler, his chief work was published merely as a continuation of the work done on the Chronicon ex chronicis by Florence of Worcester, without a suspicion of its authorship, except that it was apparently written by someone connected with Bury.

== Works ==
The current edition was taken from a manuscript at Corpus Christi College, Cambridge, No. 92, which stopped short at 1295. Another manuscript, mentioned by older biographers of Eversden, is preserved in the College of Arms (Norfolk MS. 30), and extends as far as 1296 in one handwriting; it is thence continued until 1301, after which date there is a break until 1313, "when a few slight notices occur, 1334, in another hand, and in a third an entry of 1382" The inference is that the work of Eversden himself ended in 1301, if not in 1296, and this chronicle is only original for the last portion. Down to 1152 it is a transcript of Henry of Huntingdon and his continuator, and thenceforth to 1265 it is a transcript of John de Taxster, likewise a monk of St. Edmunds. The chronicle thus only possesses an independent value for the last thirty-six years; but during these years the work of Eversden seems to have been in considerable demand, since it was evidently borrowed and largely made use of both by Bartholomew Cotton and John of Oxnead. Some considerable extracts made from Eversden by Richard James are preserved in the Bodleian Library (James MS. vii. ff. 58–73).

Besides this main chronicle, which bears the title Series temporum ab initio mundi, Eversden was the author of Regna pristina Angliæ et eorum episcopatus, a list of names compiled about 1270, and preserved in manuscript at the College of Arms. To these writings Bale adds Concordantiæ divinæ Historiæ, Legum Medulla (poems) and Concordia Decretorum.
