= Bury Chronicle =

Medieval English chronicle

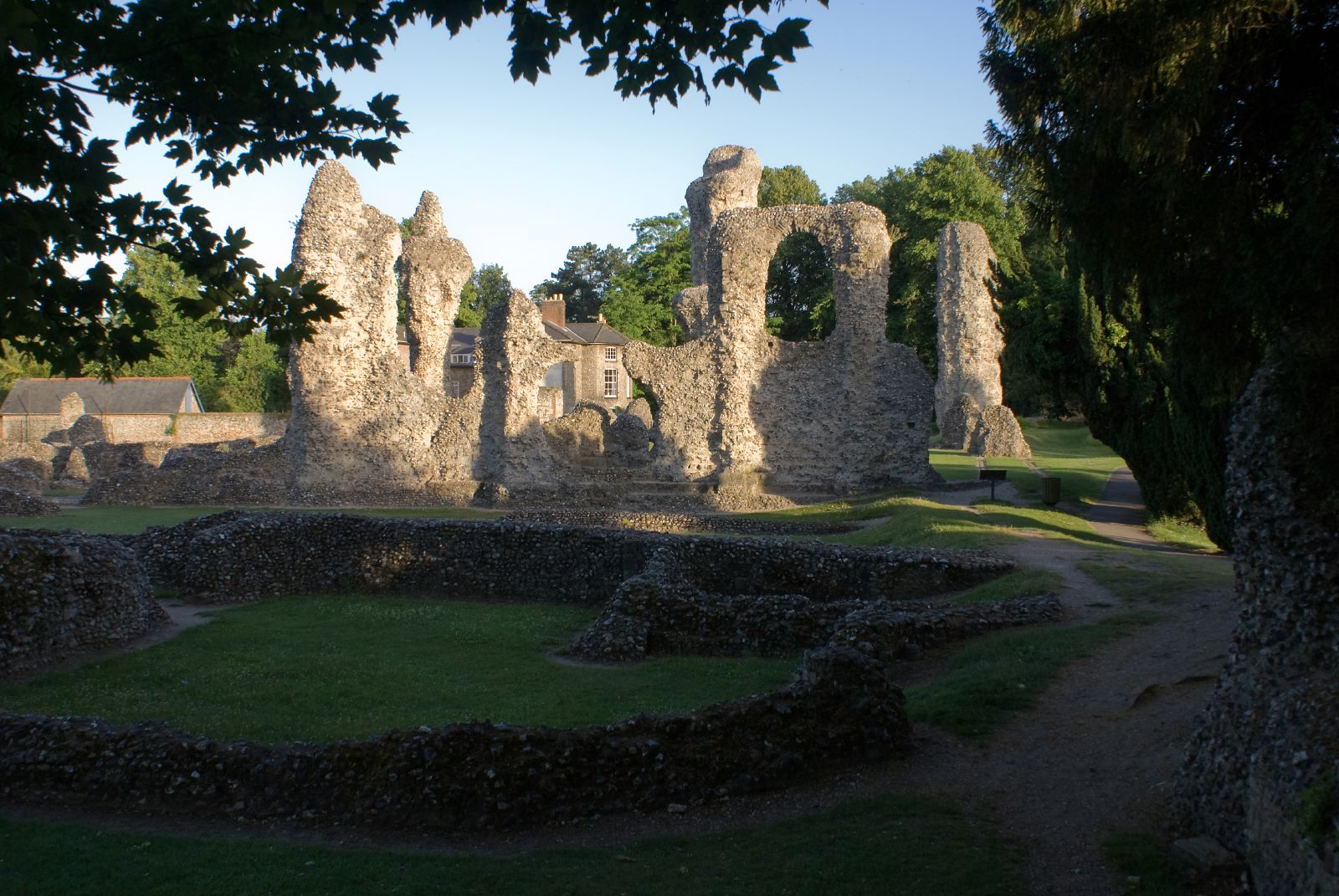
The ruins of Bury St Edmunds Abbey.

The Bury Chronicle (Latin: Chronica or Cronica Buriensis), Bury St Edmunds Chronicle, or Chronicle of Bury St Edmunds, formerly also known as the Chronica Abbreviata ("Abbreviated Chronicle"), is a medieval English chronicle compiled by John of Taxster and two other unknown Benedictine monks of Bury St Edmunds Abbey in the 13th and 14th centuries.

== Authorship ==
The first part of the Bury Chronicle was compiled by John of Taxster or Tayster, who claimed to have joined the monastery in 1244 or 1255. Galbraith makes the first date that of Taxster's vows and the second that of the first continuator's. The issue is somewhat obscured by the mistaken dual chronology introduced by Marianus Scotus and employed by John of Worcester and Taxster.

From the year 1265, another monk continued his work and, from Easter 25 March 1296, a third monk continued their work. The second author—often but baselessly identified as John of Everden—also revised Taxster's account, including some additional information on the monastery's finances and adding several passages from a few classical authors and medieval historians. The third author did not share the second's interest in financial matters, although he continued to record military and local details. Galbraith believed the poor phrasing and many mistakes of the second continuator's text resulted from a less educated monk piously appending a rough draft of the first continuator about 50 years later without much understanding of what he was transcribing.

== Contents ==
The Bury Chronicle generally directly copies its source texts from the Creation to the year 1212. Most items up to 1131 are taken from John of Worcester, probably from the copy now held as Bodleian Library MS 297, which includes substantial additions concerning the history of the abbey. Other items are taken either directly or via secondary sources from Apuleius's Golden Ass, Aulus Gellius's Attic Nights, Justin's summary of Trogus's Philippic History, Eutropius's Summary of Roman History, Jerome's translation of Eusebius's Onomasticon, Augustine's Confessions and City of God, Boethius's Consolations of Philosophy, Gildas's On the Ruin and Conquest of Britain, Bede's Ecclesiastical History, Herman of Bury's On the Miracles of St Edmund, John of Salisbury's Policraticus, William of Malmesbury's Deeds of the Kings of the English and Deeds of the Bishops of the English, Freculf's 12 Books of History, Peter the Devourer's Scholastic History, and Sigebert of Gembloux's Chronicle. From 1131 to around 1212, its main sources are Ralph de Diceto's Chronicle and the Annals of St Edmunds (Annales Sancti Edmundi, BL Harley MS 447). (The exact beginning of Taxster's original contributions is uncertain because the only surviving manuscript of the Annals is missing its final pages.)

Marginalia in the revised and continued version note its additions to Taxster's account came from Apuleius, Orosius, Eutropius, Boethius, Freculf, Marianus Scotus, and John of Worcester. Although the account has been said to end in 1301, its general record actually ends in 1300 with only minor entries afterwards in the years 1301, 1313, 1326, 1329, 1334, and 1335.

== Legacy ==
Content from the Bury Chronicle was subsequently used by numerous other historians and annalists in eastern England, including John of Eversden, John of Oxnead, and Bartholomew Cotton.

== Manuscripts ==
Taxster's section of the Bury Chronicle survives in 2 manuscripts. The first, possibly Taxster's own holograph, comprises folios 3 to 43 verso of British Library MS Cotton Julius A 1. It was damaged somewhat by the 1731 Cottonian Library fire. The other comprises folios 109 to 124 verso of Arundel MS 6, once the property of John Erghome (fl. 1353–1385), Edward North, and William Howard and now held by the College of Arms, used as a continuation of a version of John of Worcester's Chronica Chronicarum (Chronicle of Chronicles). This only contains the first continuation to Taxster's work, ending in 1295.

The revised and fully continued version of the chronicle is Arundel MS 30, held by the College of Arms. As of 2002, Antonia Gransden's 1956 dissertation providing it was the only edition of the chronicle's initial section before 1212. She subsequently published the section from 1212 to 1301 in 1964.

John of Worcester's Chronicle of Chronicles was also appended with Taxster's notes in the Peterborough Abbey version held as Cambridge Corpus Christi College MS 92. The Colchester Chronicle (BL Harley MS 1132) is another version of the Bury Chronicle, unusual in ending in 1193 and in specifically crediting William of Malmesbury for its treatment of Sceafa.

== Editions ==
The full chronicle has not been published. Benjamin Thorpe published a certain number of years from the Peterborough copy in 1849, from 1152 to 1294 according to Gransden but from 1152 to 1295 according to Thorpe himself, from 1173 to 1265 according to Luard, and from only 1258 to 1265 per Jones. Henry Richards Luard published the years 1258–1263 collated from several manuscripts in 1859 as part of the Rolls Series. Felix Liebermann published excerpts concerning Germany from several manuscripts for the Monumenta Germaniae Historica in 1888. Vivian Hunter Galbraith published the years from 1296–1301 from Coll. Arm. Arundel MS 30 in 1943. Antonia Gransden published the years 1212–1301 in 1964.
