= Henry de Bury (monk) =

Henry de Bury or Bederic (fl. 1380), was an English monk and writer.

He was a Benedictine monk from the ancient and royal Abbey of Bury St. Edmonds.
