= Siege of Canterbury =

Viking raid in September 1011

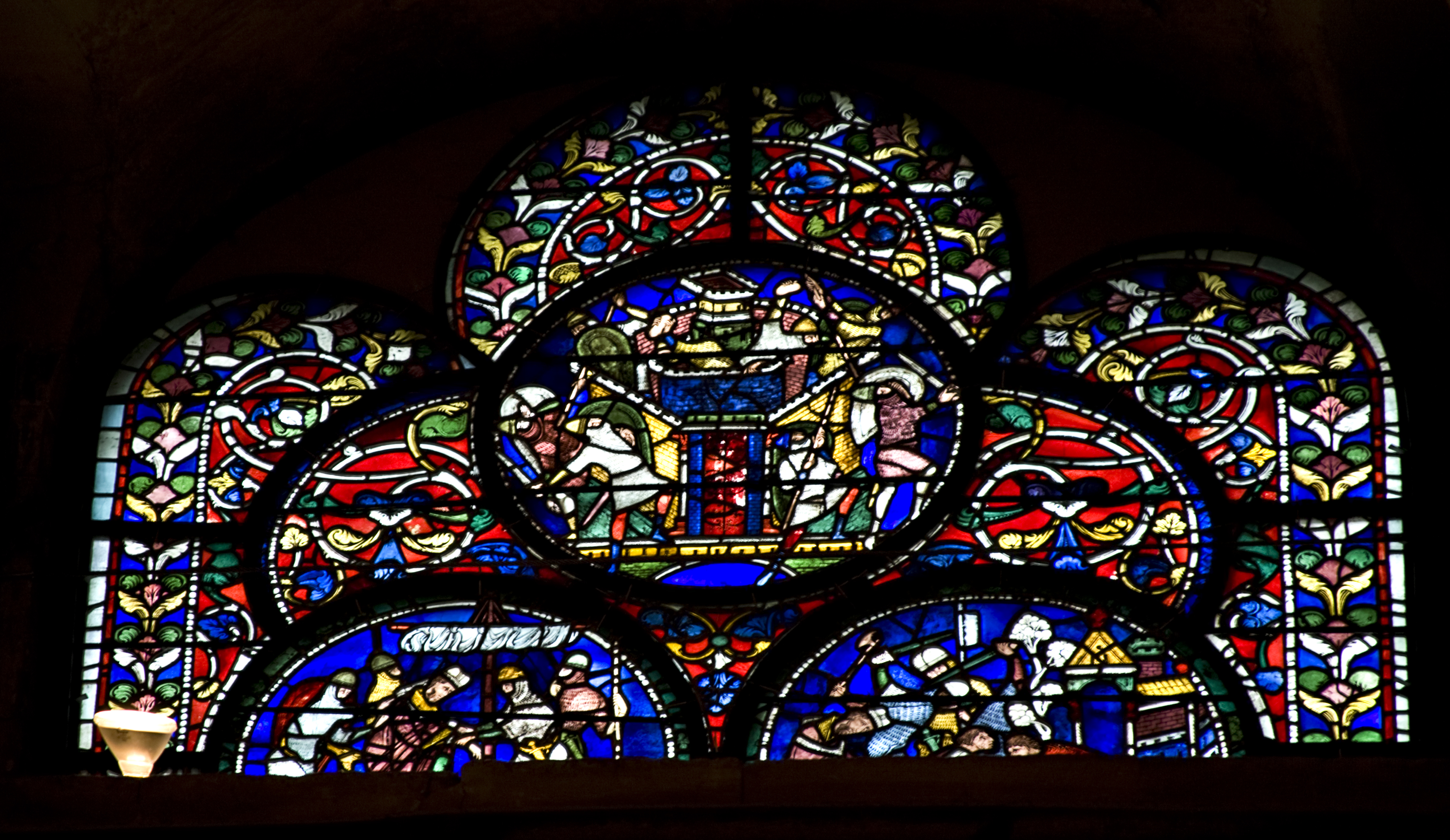
- The "Ælfheah windows" of Canterbury Cathedral were installed in the 12th century and tell the tale of the siege and the kidnap and murder of Ælfheah.
| Date | 8–29 September 1011 |
| Location | Canterbury 51°17′N 1°05′E |
| Result | Viking victory |

Belligerents
| Viking raiders | Anglo-Saxons |

Commanders and leaders
| Thorkell the Tall | Ælfheah of Canterbury (executed) |
- Kidnapping of Archbishop Ælfheah of Canterbury
- Location within England

The siege of Canterbury was a major Viking raid on the city of Canterbury that occurred between 8 and 29 September 1011, fought between a Viking army led by Thorkell the Tall and the Anglo-Saxon defenders. The details of the siege are largely unknown, and most of the known events were recorded in the Anglo-Saxon Chronicle.

== Background ==
In August 1009, a large Viking army led by Thorkell the Tall landed on the shores of Sandwich. The army initially targeted the city of Canterbury to pillage, but were promptly paid 3,000 pounds of silver in danegeld by the people of Kent to sway the army from attacking. Instead, the army went on to raid the rest of Southern England.

== The siege ==
By 8 September 1011, the army returned and laid siege to Canterbury, with the Anglo-Saxon forces relentlessly defending the city. Fellow Viking Olaf Haraldsson was also said to have joined Thorkell in the raid. After three weeks of fighting, the Vikings finally managed to break through into the city. Christian sources cite this as being due to the actions of a traitor named Ælfmaer, whose life had been previously saved by Ælfheah, the archbishop of Canterbury. Thorkell and his men laid siege to Canterbury and took several hostages of importance, including the archbishop himself. Godwine (Bishop of Rochester), Leofrun (abbess of St Mildrith's), and the king's reeve Ælfweard, were captured also, but the abbot of St Augustine's Abbey, Ælfmær, managed to escape. Canterbury Cathedral was plundered and burned by the Vikings following Ælfheah's capture.

== Aftermath ==
Ælfheah was held captive for seven months. The Vikings held Ælfheah for ransom and demanded 3,000 pounds of silver for his release. Ælfheah refused to be ransomed or have his people pay the invaders. This eventually culminated in the archbishop's murder where he was pelted with the bones of cattle before being finished off with a blow from the butt of an axe. Thorkell was seemingly against this, and was said to have tried his best to prevent the death of the archbishop, offering the attackers everything he possessed to stop the killing, save for his ship. Either out of disgust of this act or sensing the loss of control of his own men, Thorkell and a group of loyalists defected to serve the English king Æthelred the Unready as mercenaries, taking 45 Viking ships with them.
