= Florence of Worcester =

11th and 12th-century monk and historian

Florence of Worcester (Latin: Florentius Wigorniensis; died 1118) was a monk of Worcester, who played some part in the production of the Chronicon ex chronicis, a Latin world chronicle which begins with the creation and ends in 1140. The nature and extent of his contributions remain unclear.

His death is recorded in 1118 in the Chronicon:

On 7 July, the Worcester monk Florence died. His meticulous learning and scholarly labours have made this chronicle of chronicles outstanding among all others.

His body is covered by earth, his soul searches the skies.
There in the sight of God may he reign among the saints for ever. Amen.

Earlier generations of scholars took this to mean that Florence was the principal author of the chronicle for the entries before 1118, an assumption which led to its being commonly referred to as the 'Chronicle of Florence (of Worcester)'.

However, it is now recognised that the work as it survives today was authored by John, a fellow monk at Worcester, whose signature is found in two later entries (1128 and 1138). He was found working on it at the behest of Wulfstan, bishop of Worcester (d. 1095), when the Anglo-Norman chronicler Orderic Vitalis visited Worcester sometime in the early twelfth century.

Historians have formulated two main arguments against the ascription to Florence and in favour of that to John. First, there is no stylistic break in the Chronicon after Florence's death, which gives the impression that a single author was responsible for the entire work. Second, certain sections before 1118 have been shown to make use of Eadmer's Historia novorum, which was not completed before 1121 to 1124.

That said, the debt to Florence acknowledged by John in the entry for 1118 is considerable. One possibility if ultimately unverifiable is that Florence's contribution lay in assembling the source materials which John consulted for the entries covering the period between the ninth and eleventh century. A precedent for such a task commissioned by Bishop Wulfstan is the compilation and production of a cartulary, called Hemming's Cartulary, by the monk Hemming. Since nearly half a century lies between Wulfstan's death (1095) and John's final entry (1140), historian Simon Keynes has offered the tentative suggestion that Florence may have been the monk first commissioned by Wulfstan to compile material for a world chronicle and that John continued the task. According to the historian Nick Higham, William of Malmesbury and John of Worcester probably both followed a lost text of Florence.

The names of Hemming, Florence and John are found together in the Durham Liber Vitae, a confraternity book listing the names of benefactors of and visitors to the episcopal church of Durham (and its predecessor houses). The relevant section is a list of monks of St Mary's (the cathedral chapter) at Worcester, which was entered during the time when Samson was bishop of Worcester (1096–1112).>

Florence is also the first monk to be commemorated in a so-called titulus for Worcester, preserved on a mortuary roll belonging to Vitalis (d. 1122), abbot of Savigny.
