= Internet bench =

Internet-enabled bench

Coordinates: 52.2449°N 0.7166°E

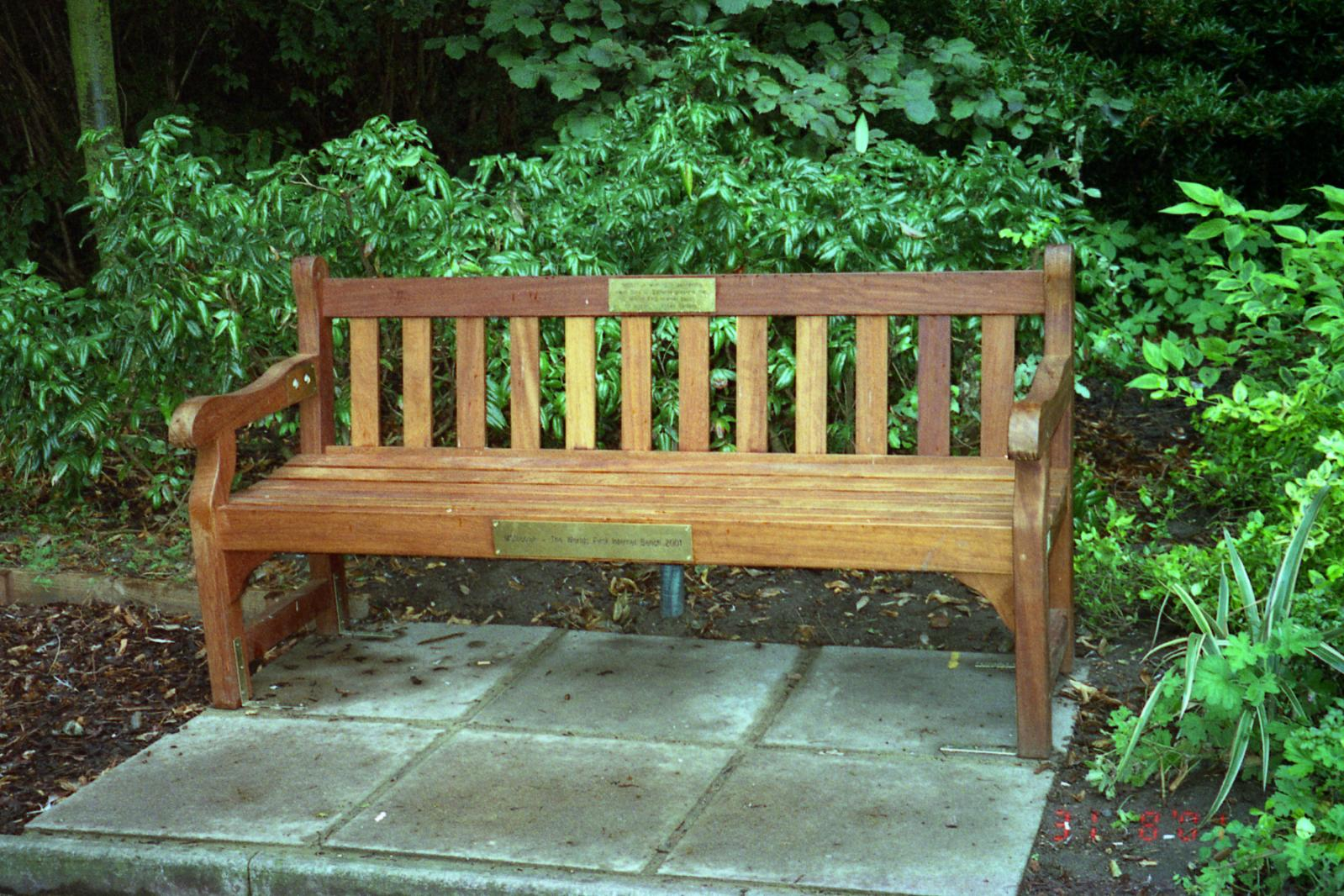
The internet bench

The internet bench, also known as the "cyber seat", was the first internet-enabled bench. It was installed in Bury St. Edmunds, Suffolk, England, on 6 August 2001. It was customized to allow seating for four people at a time who could plug their laptops into modem jacks for free. The bench became popular as a picture-taking location and was also covered by international television crews. With the advent of Wi-Fi, the bench was deactivated. It holds a Guinness World Record for being the "oldest internet bench".

== Description ==
The internet bench was installed in the Abbey Gardens in Bury St Edmunds by MSN (owned by Microsoft) with the support of the St Edmundsbury Borough Council. It supported four people at a time who could plug their laptops into provided modem jacks for free. MSN said they chose Bury St. Edmunds after receiving "applications from local authorities around the country". It cost about £60 for the bench and £30 for the modem. MSN agreed to pay for the modem for three months, after which it was the local council's responsibility to pay if they wanted to continue the project.

== History ==
The first user was Brian Bagnall, mayor of Bury St. Edmunds.

During its first days, the bench was vandalized when someone tried to "block one of the modem plugs".

BBC News reported that on first few days of the launch, two teenagers discovered that the bench could be used to make free international calls, so they phoned the local council to tell them about the problem, and also tried to reach Bill Gates but were only able to reach his secretary. After that, engineers disabled the ability to make long-distance calls.

Ann Clarke, a local council spokeswoman, said that people were fascinated with the bench; according to her, TV crews from Japan and Korea showed "intense media interest". She added that people would come to the bench just to take pictures with it. The bench was regularly patrolled and the garden where the bench was located was locked at night to prevent vandalism. Owing to the advent of Wi-Fi, the bench was deactivated, and now has a plaque stating that while it was innovative in 2001, it has been "superseded".

== Guinness World Record ==
It holds a Guinness World Record for being the "oldest internet bench".

== Gallery ==
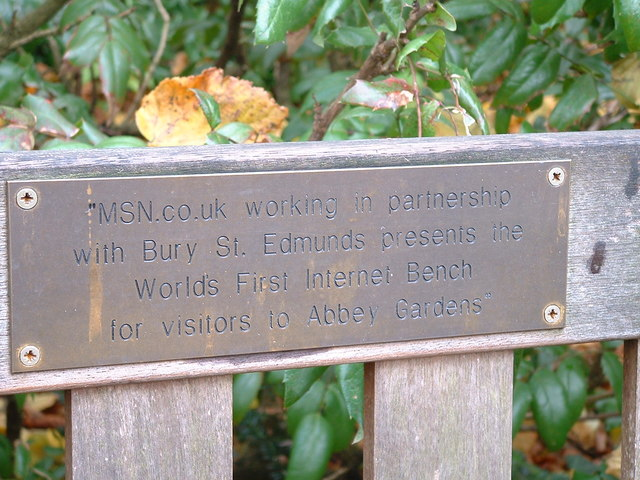
The bench's top plaque before it was disconnected

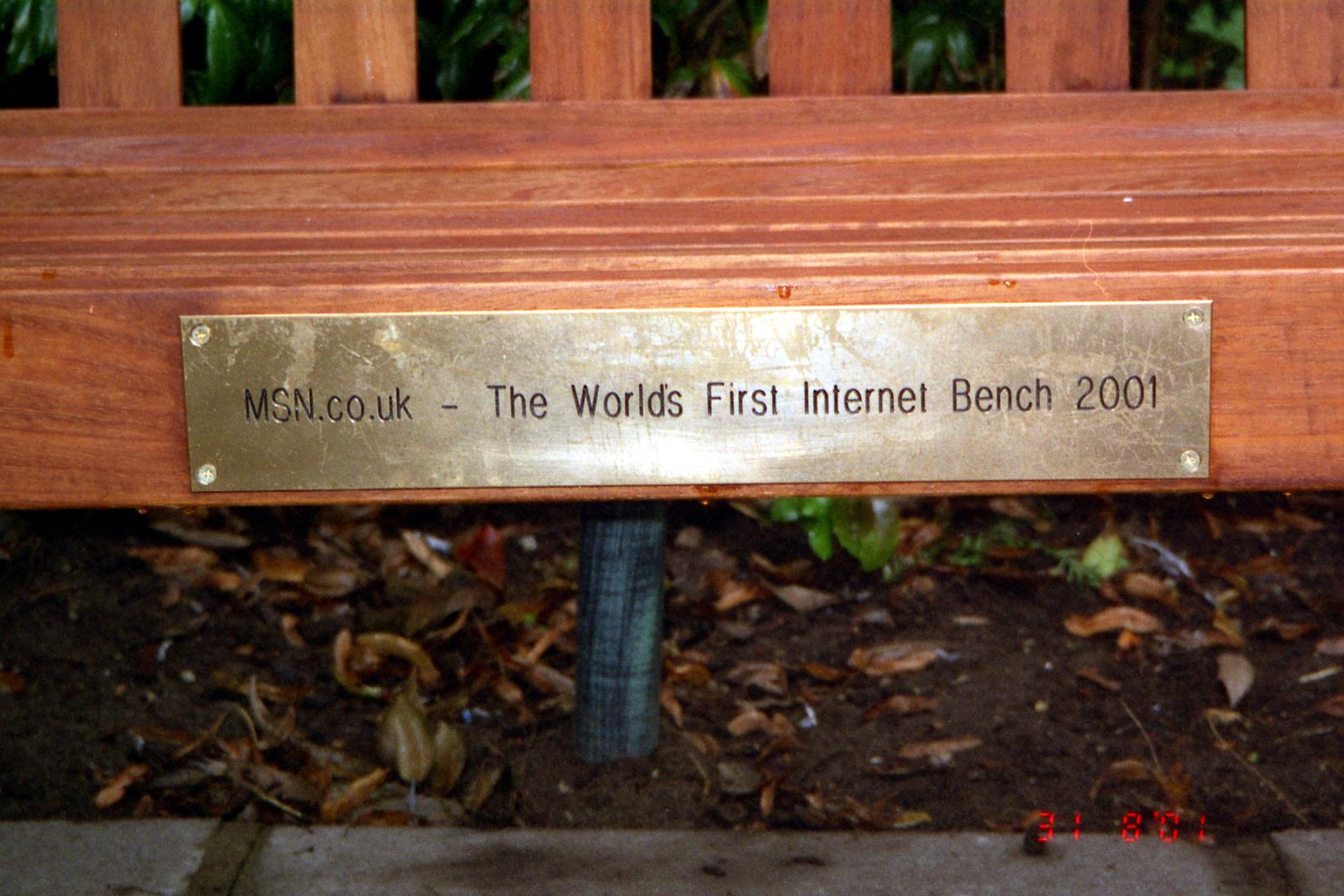
The bench's bottom plaque

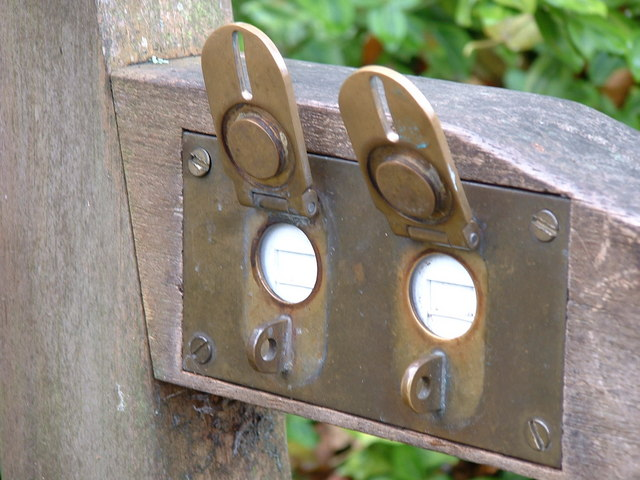
Two of the modem jacks on the bench

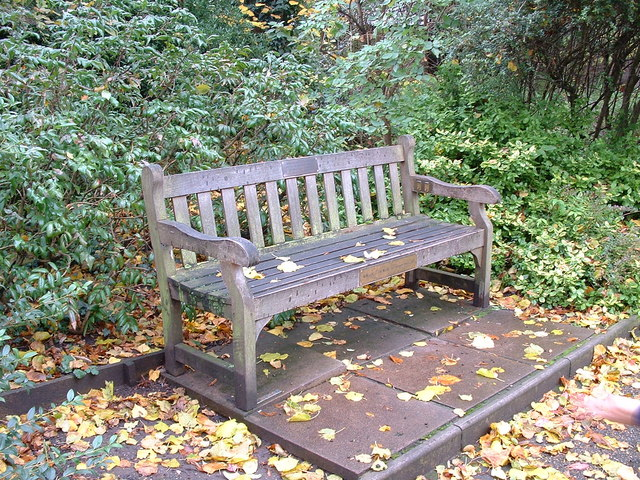
The bench in 2006
