= Grimbald (physician) =

Grimbald checking a chart, from a contemporary illustration by John of Worcester

Grimbald (died before 1138) was an Italian physician active in England from as early as 1101.

Grimbald served King Henry I as royal physician, often accompanying the king on his travels. He assisted the physician Faritius, a fellow Italian, when Queen Matilda gave birth to a son in 1101. The child died in infancy. Faritius and Grimbald may have known each other from Italy. In 1101, he witnessed Matilda's grant to Abingdon Abbey, where Faritius was abbot. He witnessed many other royal grants to Abingdon before Faritius' death in 1117. He accompanied the king to Normandy in 1113, 1126 and 1130.

Unlike Faritius, Grimbald was a layman with a wife, Atselina, and a daughter, Emma. Like his compatriot, he was amply rewarded for his services. By 1115, he had acquired a house near Winchester Castle. By 1130, he was a tenant-in-chief with fiefs held from the king in five different counties. He also held one fief from Bishop Simon of Worcester. He donated land to Montacute Priory. He may also have endowed Colne Priory.

During Henry's visit to Normandy in 1130, the king suffered from nightmares, which Grimbald described some years later to the chronicler John of Worcester. According to the latter's account, in one dream Henry was confronted by angry peasants armed with scythes and pitchforks, in another he was threatened by knights with swords and in a third a group of bishops and abbots brandished croziers and charters at him. When he asked Grimbald for advice, the physician, diagnosing the nightmares as an attack of conscience, prescribed almsgiving, prayer and good works. John speculates that Henry felt guilt for imposing high taxes and this may have been Grimbald's view also. In his chronicle, John included sketches of the king's dreams based on Grimbald's descriptions.

When Grimbald met John of Worcester he was at Winchcombe Abbey and it seems probable that he was not with Henry on the latter's final sojourn in Normandy in 1133–1135. He was dead when in 1138 his daughter transferred her inheritance to her husband, Walter Martel. His widow, Atselina, was still living. The fief held from the bishop of Worcester escheated, implying that Grimbald's daughter was his only heir.

== Works cited ==
- Kealey, Edward J. (1981). Medieval Medicus: A Social History of Anglo-Norman Medicine. Johns Hopkins University Press.
