= Leofrun =

11th-century Anglo-Saxon abbess and nun

- Title: Abbess of St Mildred's, Minster-in-Thanet, Kent

Religious life
- Religion: Catholicism

Senior posting
- Based in: England
- Period in office: 11th century

Leofrun (sometimes called Leofryn or Leofrune) was the abbess of St Mildred's, Minster-in-Thanet, Kent, a Benedictine abbey for nuns.

In 1011 Leofrun was captured by the Danes, along with Ælfheah the Archbishop of Canterbury and Godwine the Bishop of Rochester after the Danes had successfully laid siege to the town of Canterbury.

The Anglo-Saxon Chronicle entry for 1011 records that Leofrun was captured, but does not specify what her fate was. A later chronicler, John of Worcester, records the name of her house. The E and F versions of the Chronicle record her as "Abbot Leofwine", but the C and D versions have her as "Abbess Leofrun".
