= Osbern of Canterbury =

11th-century Benedictine hagiographer

Osbern of Canterbury or Monk Osbern (c. 1050 – c. 1095) was a Benedictine monk, hagiographer and musician, precentor of Christ Church, Canterbury.

== Biography ==
Osbern was born at Canterbury and brought up by Godric, who was dean from 1058 to 1080, his term living through the Norman Invasion. He became a monk, and later precentor of Christ Church, and was ordained by Archbishop Lanfranc of Canterbury (d. 1089). He died probably between 1088 and 1093.

He was acquaintances, and probably close friends, with Eadmer of Canterbury, a fellow monk and historian of Canterbury a few years his junior. Eadmer related a story in which the two, in the late 1080s, searched for the relics of Saint Audoen in the crypts of Christ Church, Canterbury. Upon finding the relics, they were delighted, but the same night, were haunted by "dreadful apparitions". Eadmer was greatly influenced by the writing style and memories of Osbern, who could better recall late Anglo-Saxon England, and he would later rewrite and improve Osbern's hagiography of Saint Dunstan.

Osbern was very skillful in music, and is said to have written two treatises: De re musica and De vocum consonantiis. But he is known best as translator of saints' lives from the Anglo-Saxon and as an original writer. William of Malmesbury praises the elegance of Osbern's style, but criticises his frequent historical inaccuracies.

== Writings ==
- Vita S. Alphegi et de translatione S. Alphegi ("Life and Translation of St Ælfheah"), in prose. It was written at Lanfranc's request, about 1080 when there arose some dispute concerning Ælfheah's sanctity. See the remarks in William of Malmesbury's Gesta Pontificum.
  - Rumble, Alexander R. (ed.) and R. Morris and A. R. Rumble (trs.) (1994). "Translatio Sancti Ælfegi Cantuariensis archiepiscopi et martiris (BHL 2519)". In Alexander R. Rumble (ed.). The Reign of Cnut: King of England, Denmark and Norway. Studies in the Early History of Britain. London: Leicester UP. pp. 283–315.
  - Patrologia Latina 149. 371–393. Available from Documenta Catholica Omnia
  - Wharton, Henry (ed.), "Osberno, ‘Vita s. Alphegi archiepiscopi Cantuariensis’." Anglia Sacra 2 (1691): 122–48.
  - Acta Sanctorum, April 2. 631.
  - Mabillon, "Acta Sanctorum. O.S. B", saec. Vi, 104;
- Vita S. Dunstani (Life of Dunstan) and Liber Miraculorum Sancti Dunstani, written in 1070 or after Lanfranc's death. Based on earlier Life by author 'B'.
  - Stubbs, W. (ed.). Memorials of St Dunstan, archbishop of Canterbury. Rolls Series 63. London, 1874. 68–164.
  - Mabillon op. cit., saec. V, 644-84; in "Acta SS.", May 4, 359; in Patrologia Latina 137. 407. The life given in Mabillon, op. cit. (p. 684), is probably the work of Eadmer.
- Vita S. Odonis archiepiscopi Cantuariensis, a lost life of Oda of Canterbury mentioned in William of Malmesbury's Gesta pontificum Anglorum.
- (Henry Wharton, in his Anglia Sacra (London, 1691), 75–87, published a life of St. Bregwin which was wrongly attributed to Osbern).
- In addition, two letters which he wrote to Anselm abbot of Bec, probably about 1093, are preserved.
  - Schmitt, F.S. (ed). S. Anselmi Cantuariensis archiepiscopi opera omnia. 6 vols. 1938–61.

== Sources ==
- Herbermann, Charles, ed. (1913). "Osbern". Catholic Encyclopedia. New York: Robert Appleton Company.
- Goebel, Bernd "Osbern von Canterbury." in Biographisch-bibliographisches Kirchenlexikon, ed. T. Bautz. Vol. 36. 2015. 997-1004.
- Goebel, Bernd "Osbern von Canterbury". In Id., Im Umkreis von Anselm: Biographisch-bibliographische Porträts von Autoren aus Le Bec und Canterbury. 2017. 68-82.
- Rubenstein, J.C. "The life and writings of Osbern of Canterbury." In Canterbury and the Norman conquest: churches, saints and scholars, 1066–1109, ed. R. Eales and R. Sharpe. 1995. 27–40.
- Vaughn, Sally N. "Among These Authors are the Men of Bec: Historical Writing among the Monks of Bec." Essays in Medieval Studies 17 (2000). Online publication
