= Ælfheah of Canterbury =

Archbishop of Canterbury from 1006 to 1012

Saint Ælfheah
- Archbishop of Canterbury
- Appointed: 1006
- Term ended: 19 April 1012
- Predecessor: Ælfric of Abingdon
- Successor: Lyfing
- Other posts: Abbot of Bath Abbey; Bishop of Winchester

Orders
- Consecration: 19 October 984

Personal details
- Born: c. 953 Weston, Somerset, England
- Died: 19 April 1012 Greenwich, Kent, England
- Buried: Canterbury Cathedral

Sainthood
- Feast day: 19 April
- Venerated in: Anglican Communion; Roman Catholic Church; Eastern Orthodox Church
- Canonized: 1078; Rome by Pope Gregory VII
- Attributes: Archbishop holding an axe
- Patronage: Greenwich; Solihull; kidnap victims
- Shrines: Canterbury Cathedral

Ælfheah (Note: Old English: Ælfhēah, "elf-tall") (Note: Officially remembered as Saint Alphege within some churches, and also called Elphege, Alfege, or Godwine.) (c. 953 – 19 April 1012), more commonly known today as Alphege, was an Anglo-Saxon Bishop of Winchester, later Archbishop of Canterbury from 1006 to 1012. He became an anchorite before being elected abbot of Bath Abbey. His reputation for piety and sanctity led to his promotion to the episcopate and, eventually, to his becoming archbishop. Ælfheah furthered the cult of Dunstan and also encouraged learning. He was captured by Viking raiders in 1011 during the siege of Canterbury and killed by them the following year after refusing to allow himself to be ransomed. Ælfheah was canonised as a saint in 1078. Thomas Becket, a later archbishop of Canterbury, is said to have prayed to Ælfheah just before his murder in Canterbury Cathedral in 1170.

== Life ==
Ælfheah was born around 953, and became a monk early in life. He first entered the monastery of Deerhurst, but then moved to Bath, where he became an anchorite. He was noted for his piety and austerity and rose to become abbot of Bath Abbey. The 12th-century chronicler, William of Malmesbury recorded that Ælfheah was a monk and prior at Glastonbury Abbey, but this is not accepted by all historians. Indications are that Ælfheah became abbot at Bath by 982, perhaps as early as around 977. He perhaps shared authority with his predecessor Æscwig after 968.

Probably due to the influence of Dunstan, the Archbishop of Canterbury (959–988), Ælfheah was elected Bishop of Winchester in 984, and was consecrated on 19 October that year. While bishop, he was largely responsible for the construction of a large organ in the cathedral, audible from over a mile (1600 m) away and said to require more than 24 men to operate. He also built and enlarged the city's churches, and promoted the cult of Swithun and his predecessor, Æthelwold of Winchester. One act promoting Æthelwold's cult was the translation of Æthelwold's body to a new tomb in the cathedral at Winchester, which Ælfheah presided over on 10 September 996.

Following a Viking raid in 994, a peace treaty was agreed with one of the raiders, Olaf Tryggvason. Besides receiving danegeld, Olaf converted to Christianity and undertook never to raid or fight the English again. Ælfheah may have played a part in the treaty negotiations, and it is certain that he confirmed Olaf in his new faith.

In 1006, Ælfheah succeeded Ælfric as Archbishop of Canterbury, probably consecrated on 16 November. taking Swithun's head with him as a relic for the new location. He went to Rome in 1007 to receive his pallium—symbol of his status as an archbishop—from Pope John XVIII, but was robbed during his journey. While at Canterbury, he promoted the cult of Dunstan, ordering the writing of the second Life of Dunstan, which Adelard of Ghent composed between 1006 and 1011. He also introduced new practices into the liturgy, and was instrumental in the Witenagemot's recognition of Wulfsige of Sherborne as a saint in about 1012.

Ælfheah sent Ælfric of Eynsham to Cerne Abbey to take charge of its monastic school. He was present at the council of May 1008 at which Wulfstan II, Archbishop of York, preached his Sermo Lupi ad Anglos (The Sermon of the Wolf to the English), castigating the English for their moral failings and blaming the latter for the tribulations afflicting the country.

In 1011, the Danes again raided England, and from 8–29 September, they laid siege to Canterbury. Aided by the treachery of Ælfmaer, whose life Ælfheah had once saved, the raiders succeeded in sacking the city. (Note: How exactly Ælfheah had saved Ælfmaer's life is not recorded in any source.) Ælfheah was taken prisoner and held captive for seven months. Godwine (Bishop of Rochester), Leofrun (abbess of St Mildrith's), and the king's reeve, Ælfweard, were captured also, but the abbot of St Augustine's Abbey, Ælfmær, managed to escape. Canterbury Cathedral was plundered and burned by the Danes following Ælfheah's capture.

== Death ==
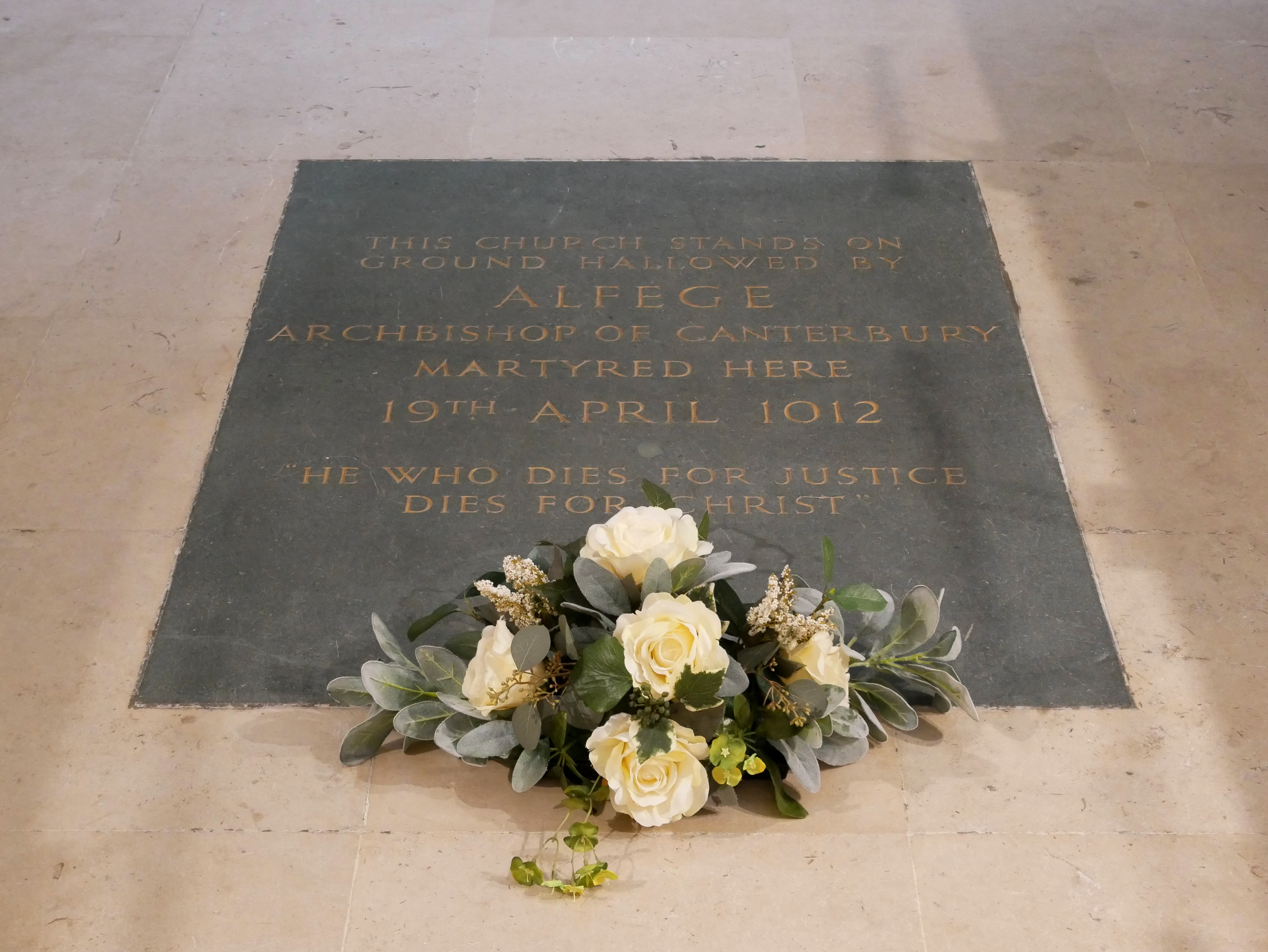
Memorial to Saint Ælfheah inside the Church of Saint Alfege, Greenwich

Ælfheah refused to allow a ransom to be paid for his freedom, and as a result was killed on 19 April 1012 at Greenwich, reputedly on the site of St Alfege's Church. The account of Ælfheah's death appears in the E version of the Anglo-Saxon Chronicle:

... the raiding-army became much stirred up against the bishop, because he did not want to offer them any money, and forbade that anything might be granted in return for him. Also they were very drunk, because there was wine brought from the south. Then they seized the bishop, led him to their "hustings" (Note: "Hustings" derives from an Old Norse word that has the meaning of assembly or council, so there may have been some sort of trial that condemned Ælfheah.) on the Saturday in the octave of Easter, and then pelted him there with bones and the heads of cattle; and one of them struck him on the head with the butt of an axe, so that with the blow he sank down and his holy blood fell on the earth, and sent forth his holy soul to God's kingdom.

Ælfheah was the first Archbishop of Canterbury to die a violent death. A contemporary report tells that Thorkell the Tall attempted to save Ælfheah from the mob about to kill him by offering everything he owned except for his ship, in exchange for Ælfheah's life; Thorkell's presence is not mentioned in the Anglo-Saxon Chronicle, however. Some sources record that the final blow, with the back of an axe, was delivered as an act of kindness by a Christian convert known as "Thrum". Ælfheah was buried in Old St Paul's Cathedral. In 1023, his body was moved by King Cnut to Canterbury, with great ceremony. (Note: Except perhaps for a finger, which a later tradition held was given by Cnut to Westminster Abbey.) Thorkell the Tall was appalled at the brutality of his fellow raiders, and switched sides to the English king Æthelred the Unready following Ælfheah's death.

== Veneration ==
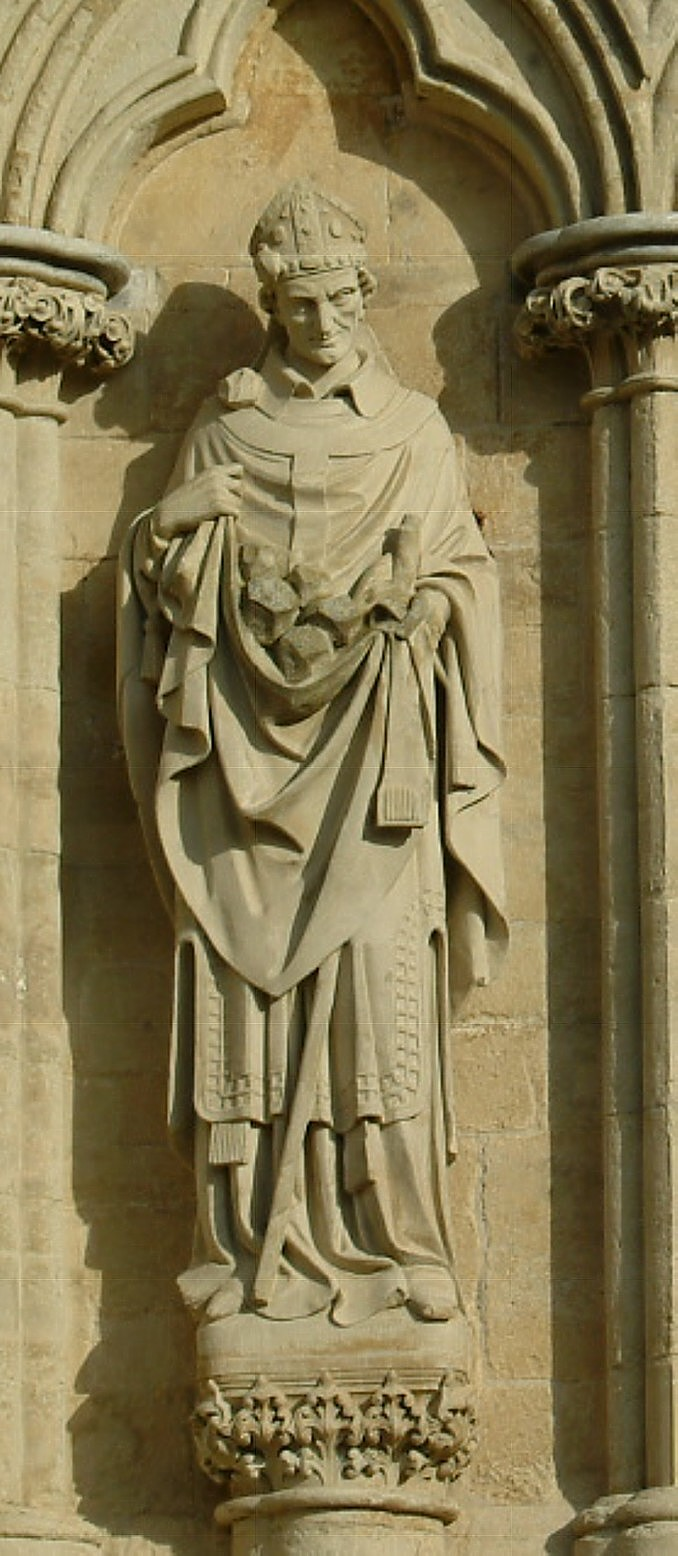
An 1868 statue on the West Front of Salisbury Cathedral by James Redfern, showing Ælfheah holding the stones used in his martyrdom.

Pope Gregory VII canonised Ælfheah in 1078, with a feast day of 19 April. Lanfranc, the first post-Conquest archbishop, was dubious about some of the saints venerated at Canterbury. He was persuaded of Ælfheah's sanctity, but Ælfheah and Augustine of Canterbury were the only pre-conquest Anglo-Saxon archbishops kept on Canterbury's calendar of saints. Ælfheah's shrine, which had become neglected, was rebuilt and expanded in the early 12th century under Anselm of Canterbury, who was instrumental in retaining Ælfheah's name in the church calendar. After the 1174 fire in Canterbury Cathedral, Ælfheah's remains, together with those of Dunstan were placed around the high altar, at which Thomas Becket is said to have commended his life into Ælfheah's care shortly before his martyrdom during the Becket controversy. The new shrine was sealed in lead, and was north of the high altar, sharing the honour with Dunstan's shrine, which was located south of the high altar. A Life of Saint Ælfheah in prose and verse was written by a Canterbury monk named Osbern, at Lanfranc's request. The prose version has survived, but the Life is very much a hagiography; many of the stories it contains have obvious Biblical parallels, making them suspect as a historical record.

In the late medieval period, Ælfheah's feast day was celebrated in Scandinavia, perhaps because of the saint's connection with Cnut. Few church dedications to him are known, with most of them occurring in Kent and one each in London and Winchester; as well as St Alfege's Church in Greenwich, a nearby hospital (1931–1968) was named after him. In the town of Solihull in the West Midlands, St Alphege Church is dedicated to Ælfheah dating back to approximately 1277. In 1929, a new Roman Catholic church in Bath, the Church of Our Lady & St Alphege, was designed by Giles Gilbert Scott in homage to the ancient Roman church of Santa Maria in Cosmedin, and dedicated to Ælfheah under the name of Alphege.

Artistic representations of Ælfheah often depict him holding a pile of stones in his chasuble, a reference to his martyrdom.

== Citations ==
Christian titles
Preceded by Æthelwold	Bishop of Winchester; 984–1006	Succeeded by Cenwulf of Winchester
Preceded by Ælfric of Abingdon	Archbishop of Canterbury; 1006–1012	Succeeded by Lyfing
