= Gesta Regum Anglorum =

Medieval chronicle by William of Malmesbury

The Gesta Regum Anglorum (Latin for "Deeds of the Kings of the English"), originally titled De Gestis Regum Anglorum ("On the Deeds of the Kings of the English") and also anglicized as The Chronicles or The History of the Kings of England, is an early-12th-century history of the kings of England by William of Malmesbury. It is a companion work of his Gesta Pontificum Anglorum (Deeds of the English Bishops) and was followed by his Historia Novella, which continued its account for several more years. The portions of the work concerning the First Crusade were derived from Gesta Francorum Iherusalem peregrinantium, a chronicle by Fulcher of Chartres.

== Editions ==
- Sharpe, John, ed. (1815), The History of the Kings of England and the Modern History of William of Malmesbury, London: W. Bulmer & Co. for Longman, Hurst, Rees, Orme, & Brown.
- Hardy, Thomas Duffus; et al., eds. (1855), "Willelmi Malmesburiensis Monachi Gesta Regum Anglorum atque Historia Novella", Saeculum XII: Willelmi Malmesburiensis Monachi Opera Omnia, Patrologiae Cursus Completus, Series Latina, Vol. 179, vol. I, Paris: Paul Dupont for Garnier Bros., pp. 959–1390. (in Latin)
- Giles, J.A., ed. (1847), William of Malmesbury's Chronicle of the Kings of England: From the Earliest Period to the Reign of King Stephen, with Notes and Illustrations, London: Henry G. Bohn.
- Mynors, R.A.B.; et al., eds. (1998), Gesta Regum Anglorum, Oxford Medieval Texts, vol. I, Oxford: Clarendon Press. (in Latin) & (in English)
- Thomson, R.M.; et al., eds. (1999), Gesta Regum Anglorum, Oxford Medieval Texts, vol. II: General Introduction & Commentary, Oxford: Clarendon Press. (in Latin) & (in English)
