= John de Taxster =

English Benedictine chronicler

John de Taxster, Taxter, or Tayster (Johannes de Taxster or Tayster; died c. 1265), sometimes erroneously called Taxston, was a 13th-century English chronicler and monk at Bury St Edmunds Abbey. Nothing is known of his life apart from what is reported in or understood from his work on the 13th and 14th-century Bury Chronicle.

== Life ==
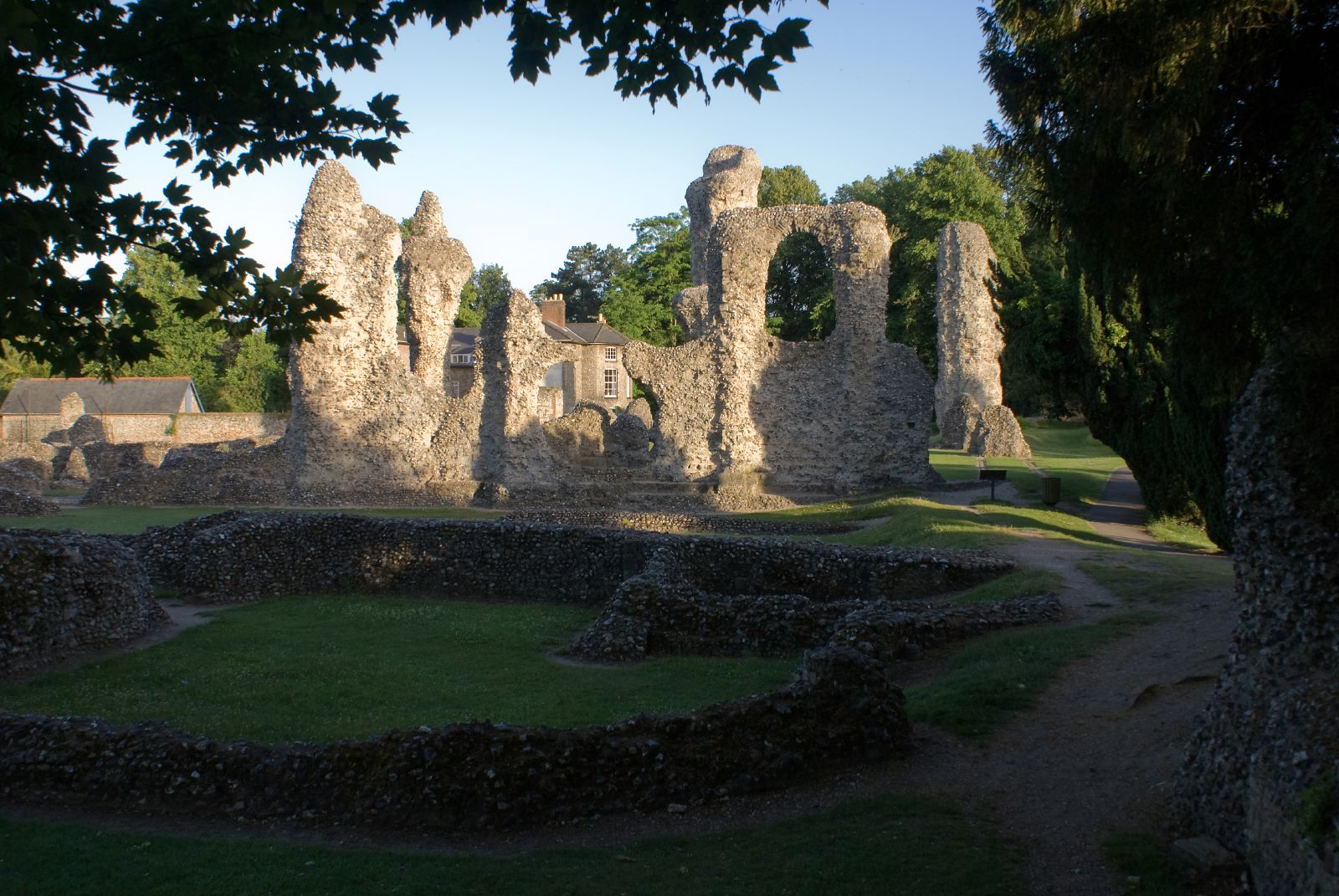
The ruins of Bury St Edmunds Abbey.

Nothing is known of John de Taxster except what is recorded in or understood from his own work. His surname—given as Taxster in one manuscript and Tayster in another—may be a variant of textor, a weaver.

He noted in his section of the Bury Chronicle that he was professed as a Benedictine monk at Bury St Edmunds Abbey in Suffolk, England, on 20 November 1244 or 1255. He does not seem to have held any notable position at the abbey and is remembered for his contribution to the Bury Chronicle, where he seems to have written the section from the Creation to 1265 during the early 1260s. It is possible that the version of the chronicle in British Library Cotton Julius MS A 1 was Taxster's own holograph. If so, he wrote a cursive book hand in black ink with important passages marked in red.

Taxster's chronicle is an important early source on the aftermath of King John's 1215 granting of the Magna Carta and a contemporary source for the 1264–1267 Second Barons' War that upheld its place in English law. Overall, Taxster himself seems to have supported the baronial party, criticizing the severity and foreignness of King Henry III and Queen Eleanor and noting the popular veneration of Simon de Montfort.

Taxster probably died around 1265, when his portion of the chronicle ends. His notice of the miracles credited to Simon de Montfort's relics appear to have been scratched from the Cotton Julius manuscript, probably around 1266 when Henry III returned to power.

== Works ==
Taxster's chronicle forms the first part of the Bury Chronicle, in which he seems to have been followed by two other writers. His section covers all of the time from the Creation to 1265 but nearly all of the early entries are simply copied from John of Worcester and other sources. His original content is usually considered to begin with the entry for the year 1212, although it's a bit uncertain given that surviving manuscripts of the Annals are missing their final pages.

== See also ==
- John of Eversden, author of a chronicle at Bury St Edmunds continuing John de Taxster's work
- Jocelyn de Brakelond, author of the Chronicle of the Abbey of St Edmunds c. 1173–1202
- Chronicle of John of Oxnead, another chronicle of the era written at St Benet's Abbey in Norfolk
- Geoffrey de Runcey, a later chronicler from Bury St Edmunds
