= Adelard of Ghent =

11th-century English biographer

Adelard of Ghent was an early 11th-century monk and hagiographer from the Benedictine monastery Saint Peter's Abbey, Ghent, now in modern-day Belgium.

He was commissioned by Archbishop Ælfheah of Canterbury to produce a piece of hagiography on Saint Dunstan. Sometime between 1006 and 1011, Adelard composed a series of twelve lections to be used as liturgy for the office of matins on the feast-day of St Dunstan (19 May) for Ælfheah. Adelard wrote the lections at his home monastery at St Peter's.

== Print editions ==
- Edition and translation by Michael Winterbottom and Michael Lapidge, The Early Lives of St Dunstan, Oxford University Press, 2012.
- Previously edited by William Stubbs in Memorials of St Dunstan, Archbishop of Canterbury. Rolls Series 63. London, 1874. 53–68.
