= Gesta Pontificum Anglorum =

12th-century English chronicle in Latin

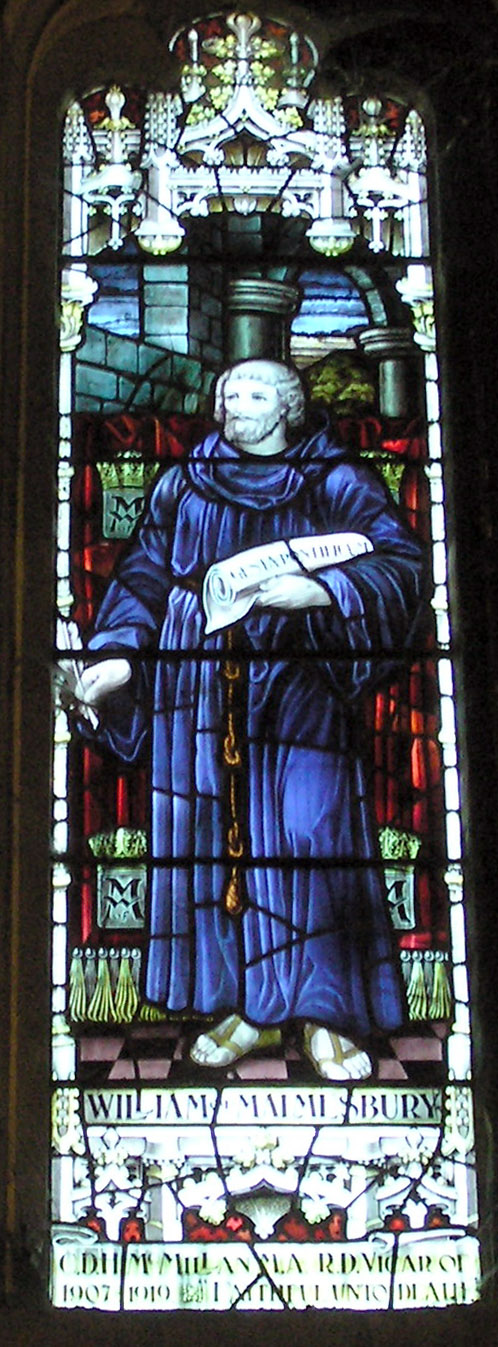
Author William of Malmesbury in stained glass

The Gesta Pontificum Anglorum (Latin for "Deeds of the Bishops of the English"), originally known as De Gestis Pontificum Anglorum ("On the Deeds of the Bishops of the English") and sometimes anglicized as The History or The Chronicle of the English Bishops, is an ecclesiastical history of England written by William of Malmesbury in the early 12th century. It covers the period from the arrival of St Augustine in AD 597 until the time it was written. Work on it was begun before Matilda's death in 1118 and the first version of the work was completed in about 1125. William drew upon extensive research, first-hand experience and a number of sources to produce the work. It is unusual for a medieval work of history, even compared to William's other works, in that its contents are so logically structured. The History of the English Bishops is one of the most important sources regarding the ecclesiastical history of England for the period after the death of Bede.

One of William's themes in the Gesta Pontificum Anglorum, as in his Gesta Regum Anglorum, is that the Normans' invasion and conquest of England saved the English and rescued their civilization from the barbarities of the native English and restored England to the Latin culture of the continent. One aspect of this theme was William's reluctance to give Anglo-Saxon names in their native form, instead Latinizing them.

The History of the English Bishops enjoyed reasonable success and was known in England during the next century, although its popularity paled besides that of its companion work, the Chronicle of the Kings of England, which within William's lifetime was known not only in England, but in Flanders, France and Normandy. It became the basis of a number of later works dealing with ecclesiastical history, including those written at Durham, Bury St Edmunds and Worcester.

== Contents ==
Although William's concurrent work, the Chronicle of the Kings of England, drew heavily on the Anglo-Saxon Chronicle for both structure and content, in the History of the English Bishops the author had no ready guide and had to set up a new structure for the work. This he did by arranging his material by diocese and grouping the dioceses by the ancient Anglo-Saxon kingdoms they had belonged to. Within the description and history of each diocese, William wrote about the bishops and monasteries, plus any additional interesting information.

=== Book One ===
The Kingdom of Kent: Beginning with the primatial see of Canterbury and its first archbishop St Augustine, it then leads on to the bishopric of Rochester.

=== Book Two ===
The Kingdoms of East Anglia, Essex, Sussex and Wessex: In addition to the bishoprics of London, Norwich, Winchester, Sherborne, Salisbury, Bath, Exeter and Chichester William also details twenty-three religious houses.

=== Book Three ===
The Kingdom of Northumbria: Including the bishoprics of York, Lindisfarne and Durham. William admitted to not knowing a great deal about the monasteries in the north of England and only covered those at Wearmouth and Whitby. William also touches on other aspects from history such as the well preserved Roman remains at Carlisle, where he mentions a stone vaulted triclinium.

=== Book Four ===
The Kingdom of Mercia: Covers the bishoprics of Worcester, Hereford, Lichfield/Coventry, Dorchester/Lincoln and Ely. More familiar territory to William than Northumbria, he describes nineteen monasteries.

=== Book Five ===
The history of Malmesbury Abbey, to which William belonged, and the life of its founding Abbot, St Aldhelm.

== Sources ==
The History of the English Bishops, in the manner of many chroniclers' continuations, begins where Bede's Historia Ecclesiastica Gentis Anglorum left off. So William relied heavily on the work of Bede for the early historical information, but also used the work of other medieval historians such as Eadmer. He also used records and documents such as the Anglo-Saxon Chronicle, episcopal lists and the letters and works of his predecessors and contemporaries. For example William had put together a collection of letters and texts by St Anselm. There is also evidence to suggest William travelled to many of the places he mentions and used local manuscripts and he also provides many detailed topographical observations.

== Variants ==
Magdalen College, Oxford MS lat. 172 was written around 1125 in William's own hand, making it the oldest surviving autograph manuscript from England. It takes the form of a pocket-sized book, its parchment leaves measuring 7.1 by 4.8 inches. At the head of folio 1 is the Malmesbury Abbey impressed mark, and a pagination in Arabic numerals in a 14th-century hand indicates that no pages have been lost since then. It contains his subsequent annotations which show he continued to revise the text over at least the next decade. His edits often removed comments about his contemporaries. Unfortunately, some of William's marginalia are affected by a trimming by a bookbinder in the 17th century. This is the only medieval manuscript in which Book Five survives in full although there are a handful of later copies.

William continued to revise the text over the next decade or so, with many of the revisions removing potentially offensive remarks about his contemporaries. Copies were made of the manuscript prior to and after the revisions and subsequently several descendants of these as well. All together there are nineteen medieval versions of the manuscript that provide us with a complex yet large record of the history of the text.

The first printed edition of the History of the English Bishops was produced by Sir Henry Savile in 1596. He used Cambridge University Library's MS Ff.1.25.1 as his source and so it contains only the first four books. The source manuscript itself was a descendant of British Library Royal 13 D V, itself a copy of Magdalen College, Oxford MS lat. 172.
