= Thomas Forester =

American mutual fund manager

- Born: Thomas Harland Forester; December 15, 1958 (age 67)
- Occupations: money manager, trader
- Employer: Forester funds
- Known for: Only profitable stock mutual fund manager in 2008
- Title: founder, Chairman, and CEO
- Spouse: Kaye
- Children: 2
- Website: www.forestervalue.com

Thomas H. Forester (born December 15, 1958) is an American mutual fund manager. He was the only long-focused United States stock mutual fund manager to make a profit in 2008. He turned a profit in the third quarter of 2002, during the stock market downturn of 2002 and was first in his asset class year-to-date through November 1, 2004.

Forester is a value investor who makes decisions based on fundamentals such as price–earnings ratio. His fund focuses on large-value stocks. He is a contrarian investor. Like many value investors, he is a more of a portfolio investor than a short-term trader. One of the most important financial ratios for Forest was the ratio of home prices to incomes, which helped him foresee the United States housing market correction. His fund has typically underperformed during market rallies.

Due to Forester's investing style of buying stocks with low price–earnings ratios and good earnings prospects, he has been compared to Warren Buffett. Forester loosely quotes Buffett at times such as in Barron's when he said: "It's When The Tide Goes out that you find out who's swimming without a bathing suit. I have mine on." Forester maintains previous employer Sir John Templeton as his role model. He invests by the philosophy credo that "I buy undervalued stocks, and if there are none, I go to cash."

While his fund at one point had $250 million in assets under management, by 2018, it was down to $40 million. The fund posted losses in 2012, 2015, 2016, and 2017, and never exceeded a 10% return after 2010. It currently has $3 million in assets.

== Early life and career ==
Forester grew up in Illinois. There he attended the Kellogg School of Management at Northwestern University where he earned his MBA. Through the 1970s and while he was still at college, Forester helped his father manage an investment portfolio. He started his career as a money manager in 1992 assisting in the management of a US$50 million fund for Sir John Templeton. He later worked for Wells Fargo in Minneapolis, Minnesota and Scudder Investments in New York City. In 1998, he lost money in subprime lending.

== Forester Value Fund ==
In 1999, Forester used $100,000 of his own money to establish Forester Value, a large cap value fund. Although he was in cash during the dot-com bubble, which proved to be profitable for a while, he trailed the S&P 500 by 28% in 2003.

=== Performance before 2008 ===
In the third quarter of 2002, his fund was one of two out of 6,000 that turned a profit, returning 5.2%, but went to 100% cash by the end of the quarter.

Between 2001 and 2008, the fund had been in the top 20% of its peer group three times and in the bottom 10% four times. Between 2005 and 2008, the fund had nearly broken even.

In 2004, the fund was subject of controversy when Morningstar, Inc. attempted to reclassify it into the conservative-allocation fund category. Mutual fund managers, including Forester, believed that the fund belonged in another classification such as a large-cap value fund, which is how Lipper had it classified. Value Line classified it as an income fund at the time. The move resulted in the fund performing first in its category in 2004. The controversy led to complaints to Morningstar, Inc. and the U.S. Securities and Exchange Commission.

His wife, Kaye, had been encouraging him to close his business. In October 2007, they agreed that he would close the business if he was not beating the S&P 500 by 10% by March. Although he only outperformed the S&P 500 by 9.5%, his wife agreed to allow him to keep the business going. After his fund took first place for year-to-date returns in the summer, he put 30% in cash.

=== 2008 performance ===
Through 2008, the fund had a five-year total return of 25%.

In its first 10 years of existence, the fund only had one down year - in 2007.

In 2008, there were 8,200 diversified United States stock mutual funds, and they averaged a negative 39% rate of return. 1,700 of these funds have been in existence for over three years and have assets of at least $50 million. Forester's Forester Value Fund (FVALX), which is Morningstar five-star-rated, gained .4% in 2008 although one year it lagged the S&P 500 by 30%. The fund, which had been up 7% through June 30 by avoiding the United States housing bubble and the Subprime mortgage crisis, was down 4.3% on the year through December 15 and 0.82% on the year as of the last day of trading. Morningstar tracks a total of 9,918 mutual funds that averaged a 39.1% loss in 2008. Much of Forester's success was attributable to large cash positions. However, he also benefited from several timely trades in the banking sector, health care. His fund held positions in countercyclical stocks that perform well in recessions. He had also held large cash positions during the dot-com bubble. In 2008, he benefitted from investments in Walmart and Anheuser-Busch.

Forester conceded that because his fund is smaller than many of his peers, he is able to get in and out of portfolio positions faster than others and that his returns would have been much lower if he had been managing a larger portfolio. However, he said his success at beating the market was more attributable to his financial market assessments than his fund's size. Assets under management grew fivefold during 2008.

==== Media attention due to 2008 performance ====
During and after his 2008 market success, Forester, who runs his fund from Libertyville, became a celebrity. He made his first television appearance in December and newspapers from as far away as Chile's El Mercurio have requested interviews with him.

=== Underperformance in 2009 and thereafter ===
In 2009, the fund was in the bottom quartile of its peer group. He remained cautious in 2009, investing in Microsoft.

In 2009, the fund's three-year and five-year averages were 9% and 7.5% ahead of the market.

He had approximately 16%-17% in cash in March 2010 and was very cautious.

In June 2010, he was increasing his cash position. At that time, his fund had $104 million in assets under management. By the end of 2010, he had 45% in cash.

In August 2011, he was again shifting assets to cash.

In April 2012, he falsely believed that the stock market rally was closer to the end than the beginning.

In 2015, he falsely predicted that China would be in a recession, increased his cash position to 30% and hedged his portfolio.

== Personal life ==
Forester moved to Libertyville, Illinois, a northern suburb of Chicago, in 1998 when he purchased a home in the town. He was a trustee of the Cook Memorial Library District. In 2004, he attempted to run on a Republican slate of delegates for United States President George W. Bush. However, due to an insufficient number of signatures on the slate's petition, they were removed from the ballot. He was unsuccessful in his election to the Cook Memorial Library District Board in during the 2005 municipal elections.

He is married to Kaye Forrester, with whom he is raising two children. He works from home.
