= Chronica Johannis de Oxenedes =

Medieval English chronicle

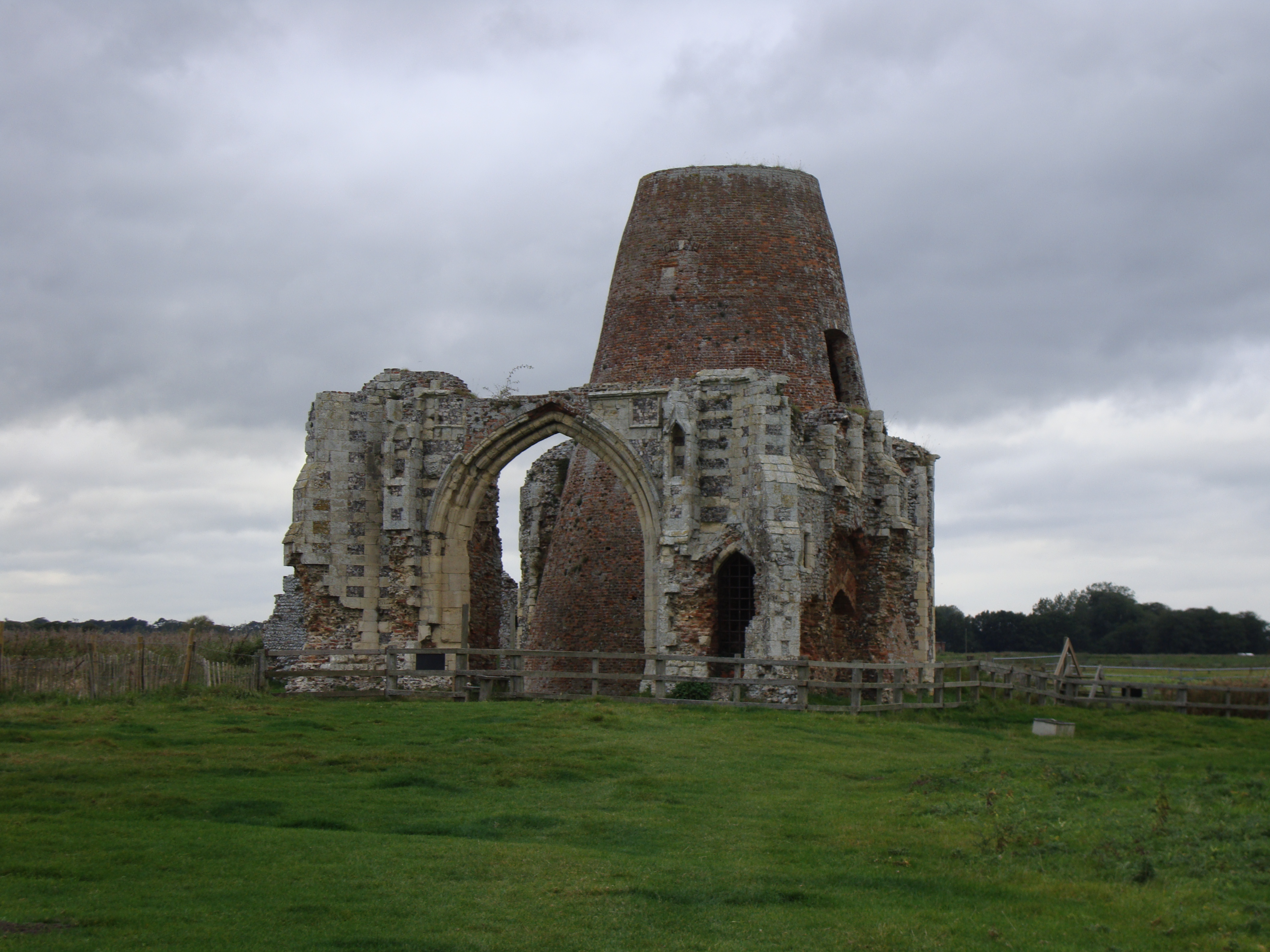
The remains of the gatehouse of St Benet of Holm Abbey, Norfolk

The Chronica Johannis de Oxenedes (Latin for "Chronicle of John of Oxnead") is a medieval English chronicle written in Latin. It concerns English history, chiefly from the reign of Alfred the Great to the beginning of the reign of Edward I, and is believed to have been composed around the year 1290 by an otherwise unknown monk of St Benet's Abbey in Horning, Norfolk.

== Authorship ==
The chronicle was written by a monk of the Benedictine abbey of St Benet's in Horning, Norfolk, made clear by his personal involvement in events related to that abbey, as well as the inclusion of a history of the house.

The author is generally supposed to have come from the former village of Oxnead, (Note: The manor at Oxnead was the main seat of the Paston family.) which lies about ten miles from the abbey. This supposition is supported by the fact that a number of monks at the abbey were given the name of their village as an appellation.

== Content ==
Following a trend from around the time of Henry I, the chronicler has compiled a register of historical events from previous sources and has edited, removed, or added events that he perceived to be less or more important or of which he himself had personal knowledge.

The chronicler mentions the arrival of Hengist and Horsa but really begins the narration at the reign of Alfred the Great.

Highlights of the chronicle also include the reign of Edgar, the treatment of Jews in England at the time of the Norman Conquest, the Purgatory of St. Patrick, the reign of Henry III and the arrival of the elephant of Henry III in England in 1255.

As is usual in medieval chronicles, the accounts of events near the author's own period are richer in detail and greater in length. In this case, the account of the Battle of Lewes is of particular interest, as are the defeat of the Llywelyn ap Gruffudd, Prince of Wales, in 1282 and the punishment in which Rhys ap Meredith was tied to the tail of a horse and dragged to his death. The accounts of the floods which took place in Norfolk at this time, especially that of 1282, are also unusually detailed.

The chronicle ends suddenly in the middle of a sentence about Robert of Winchelsey; the rest of that sheet is blank. This is seen not as a fault on the author's part, but rather a scribe who was unable to continue his transcript for some reason.

The chronicle is known in just two manuscripts. One, edited for the Rolls series by Sir Henry Ellis in 1859, is Cottonian Nero D.ii. Another subsequently came to light among the manuscripts from Clumber now at the British Library.

== Sources ==
The author himself mentions the following sources in the text:

- William of Malmesbury
- The Chronicle of Hugh de St. Victor
- Polycraticus Cartonensis
- Veteres Historiae Hibernienses
- Roger of Wendover

Other sources have been strongly identified, through textual comparison, as sources which the chronicler consulted.

- The Chronicon Anglicanum of Ralph de Coggeshale
- Matthew Paris' Chronica Majora
- The Chronicle of John of Wallingford.

== See also ==
- John de Taxster
