= Bury St Edmunds Abbey =

Benedictine monastery in England

Coordinates: 52.2441°N 0.7192°E

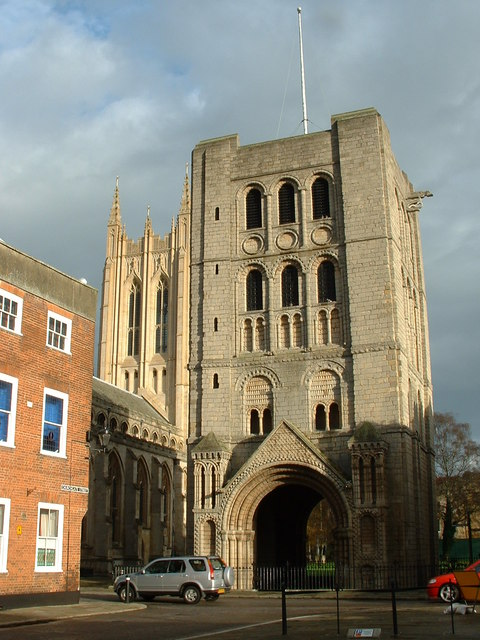
The Norman Tower, a gateway and bell tower in front of the new cathedral tower

The Abbey of Bury St Edmunds was once among the richest Benedictine monasteries in England, until its dissolution in 1539. It is in the town that grew up around it, Bury St Edmunds in the county of Suffolk, England. It was a centre of pilgrimage as the burial place of the Anglo-Saxon martyr-king Saint Edmund, killed by the Great Heathen Army of Danes in 869. The ruins of the abbey church and most other buildings are merely rubble cores, but two very large medieval gatehouses survive, as well as two secondary medieval churches built within the abbey complex.

== History ==
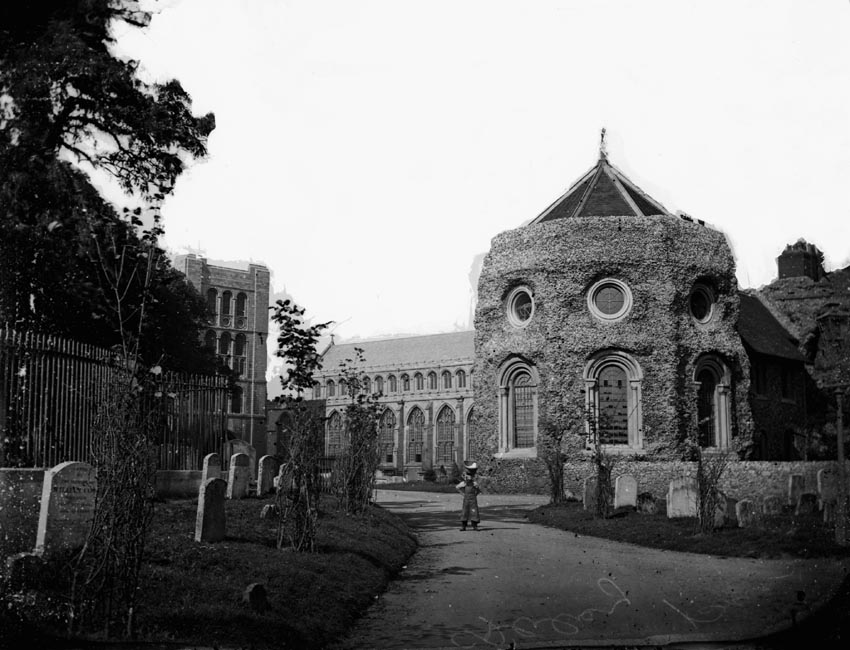
View of churchyard and (L-R) Norman Tower, St James Church and SW tower of the abbey, c. 1920

In the early 10th century the allegedly incorrupt (i.e. not decomposed) body of the martyred king, St Edmund, was translated from Hægelisdun to Beodricsworth, afterwards known as St Edmundsbury, a site that had probably had a monastery founded by St Sigeberht some three centuries earlier. At this time the early shrine was guarded by a group of secular priests, but in c. 1020, under the auspices of King Cnut and Ælfwine, the then Bishop of Elmham, they were replaced by monks from St Benet's Abbey and a Benedictine Abbey of St Edmundsbury was founded. Two of the monks from St Benet's Abbey became Bury's first two abbots: Ufi, prior of Holme, (d. 1044), who was consecrated abbot by the Bishop of London; and Leofstan (1044–65). After Leofstan's death, the king appointed his physician Baldwin to the abbacy (1065–97). Baldwin rebuilt the church and reinterred St Edmund's body there with great ceremony in 1095. The cult made the richly endowed abbey a popular destination for pilgrimages.

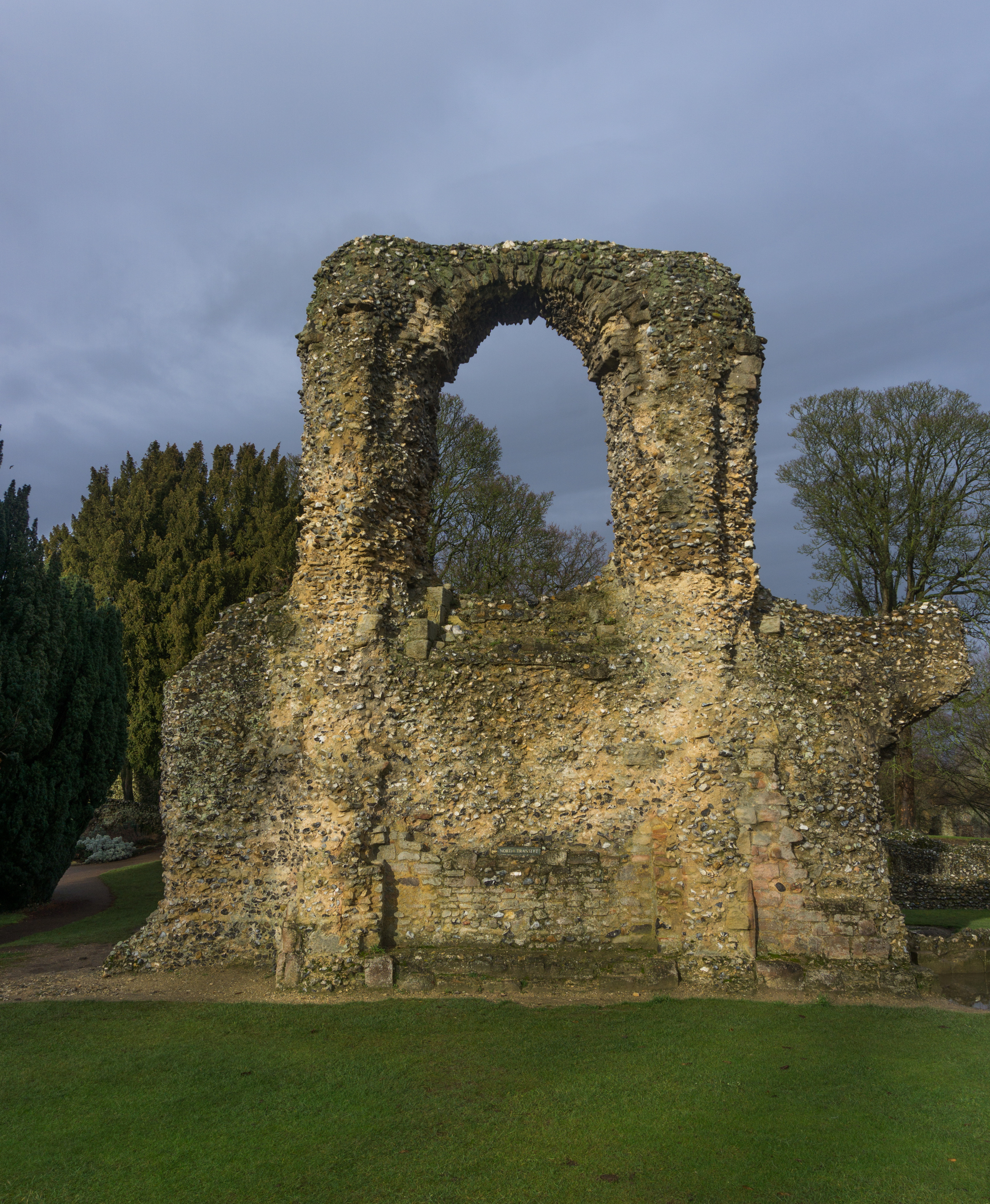
North transept of the abbey

The abbey church of St Edmund was built in the 11th and 12th centuries on a cruciform plan, with an apsidal east end. The shrine of St Edmund stood behind the high altar. The abbey was much enlarged and rebuilt during the 12th century. At some 505 ft (154 m) long, and spanning 246 ft (75 m) across its westerly transept, Bury St Edmunds abbey church was one of the largest in the country. It is now ruined, with only some rubble cores remaining, but two other separate churches which were built within the abbey precinct survive, having always functioned as parish churches for the town. St James's Church, now St Edmundsbury Cathedral, was finished around 1135. St Mary's Church was first built around 1125, and then rebuilt in the Perpendicular style between 1425 and 1435.

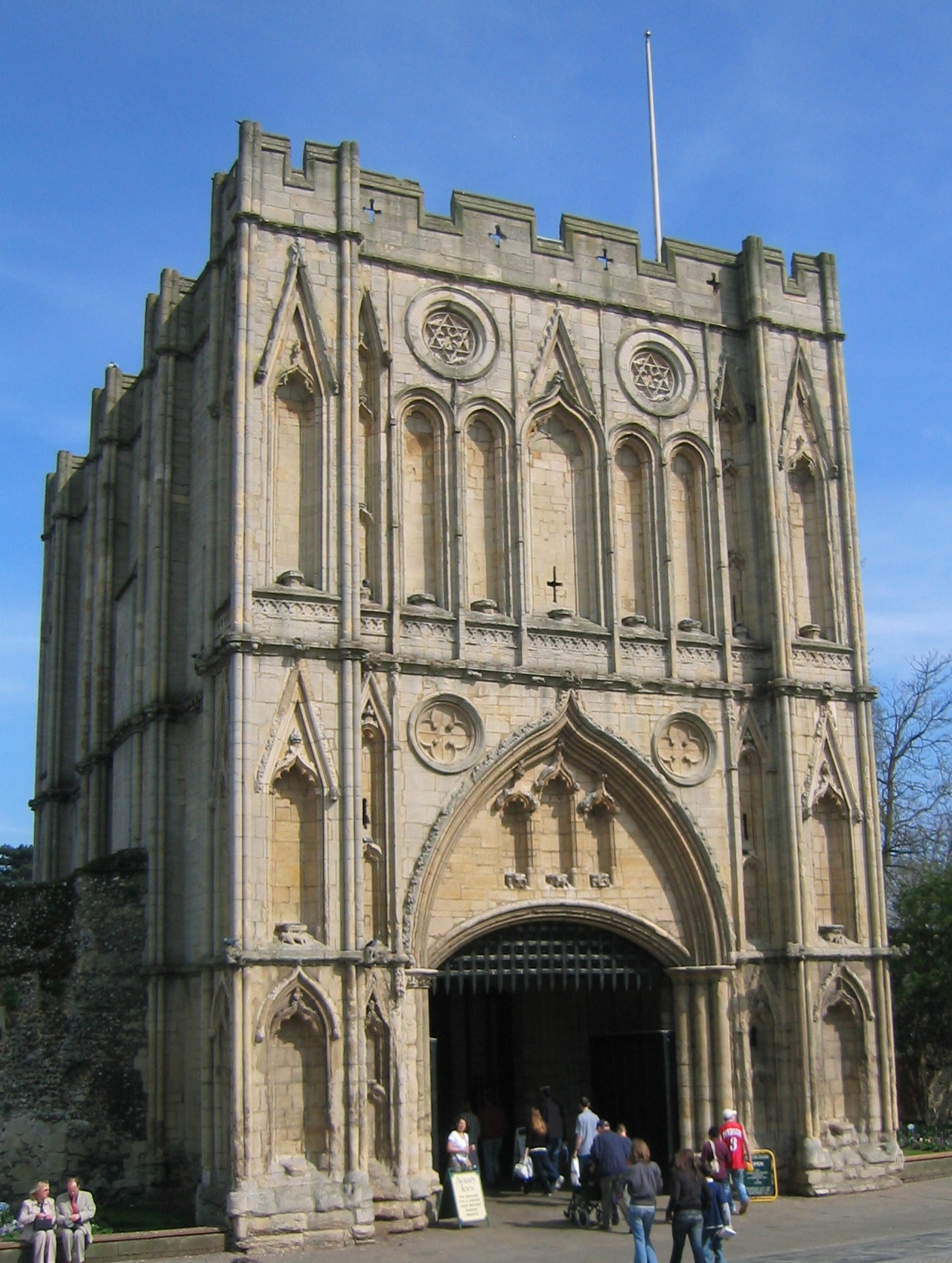
Abbey Gate, rebuilt in the mid-14th century

Abbey Gate, opening onto the Great Courtyard, was the secular entrance which was used by the abbey's servants.

The Cloisters Cross, also referred to as the "Bury St Edmunds Cross", is an unusually complex 12th-century Romanesque altar cross, carved from walrus ivory. it is now in the Metropolitan Museum of Art in New York City. The sculptor is not known. Thomas Hoving, who managed the acquisition of the cross while he was associate curator at the Cloisters, concluded that it was carved by Master Hugo at the abbey. There is no certain evidence to suggest that the cross was even made in England, however, although this is accepted by most scholars, and other places of origin such as Germany have been proposed.

In 1327 the abbey was destroyed during the Great Riot by the local people, who were angry at the power of the monastery, and it had to be rebuilt. The Norman Gate dates from 1120 to 1148 and was designed to be the gateway for the abbey church and it is still the belfry for the Church of St James, the present cathedral of Bury St Edmunds. This four-storey gate-hall is virtually unchanged and is entered through a single archway. Abbey Gate is an impressive 14th-century stone gatehouse, designed to be the gateway for the Great Courtyard. One of the best surviving examples of its type, this two-storey gate-hall is entered through a single archway which retains its portcullis. The Crankles was the name of the fishpond near the river Lark. The vineyard was first laid out in the 13th century. There were three breweries in the abbey as each monk was entitled to eight pints a day.

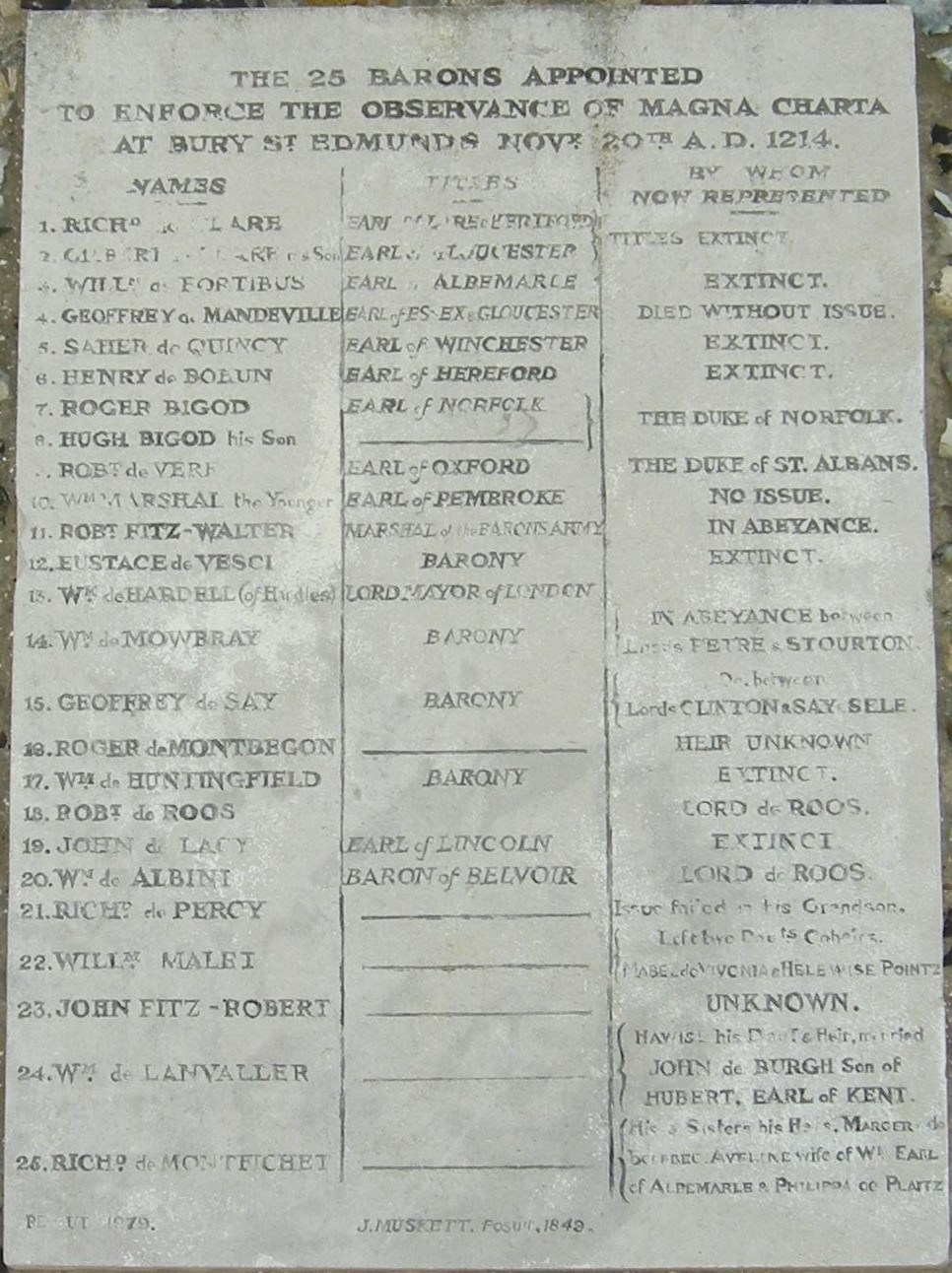
Modern inscription within the abbey ruins commemorating events in 1214, leading to the promulgation of Magna Carta in 1215

The abbey's charters granted extensive lands and rights in Suffolk. By 1327, the abbey owned all of West Suffolk. The abbey held the gates of Bury St Edmunds; they held wardships of all orphans, whose income went to the Abbot until the orphan reached maturity; they pressed their rights of corvée. In the late 12th century, the abbot Adam Samson forced the Dean Herbert to destroy the new windmill he had built without permission. Adam said: "by the face of God! I will never eat bread until that building is destroyed!"

The town of Bury St Edmunds was designed by the monks in a grid pattern. The monks charged tariffs on every economic activity, including the collecting of horse droppings in the streets. The abbey even ran the Royal Mint. During the 13th century general prosperity blunted the resistance of burghers and peasants; in the 14th century, however, the monks encountered hostility from the local populace. Throughout 1327, the monastery suffered extensively, as several monks lost their lives in riots, and many buildings were destroyed. The townspeople attacked in January, forcing a charter of liberties on them. When the monks reneged on this they attacked again in February and May. The hated charters and debtors' accounts were seized and triumphantly torn to shreds. A reprieve came on 29 September 1327 when Queen Isabella arrived at the abbey with an army from Hainaut. She had returned from the continent with the intention of deposing her husband, King Edward II. She stayed at the abbey a number of days with her son the future Edward III.

On 18 October 1327, a group of monks entered the local parish church. They threw off their habits, revealing they were armoured underneath, and took several hostages. The people called for the hostages' release: but monks threw objects at them, killing some. In response, the citizens swore to fight the abbey to the death. They included a parson and 28 chaplains. They burnt the gates and captured the abbey.

In 1345, a special commission found that the monks did not wear habits or live in the monastery. Already faced with considerable financial strain, the abbey went further into decline during the first half of the 15th century. In 1431 the west tower of the abbey church collapsed. Two years later Henry VI moved into residence at the abbey for Christmas, and was still enjoying monastic hospitality four months later. More trouble arose in 1447 when the Duke of Gloucester died in suspicious circumstances after his arrest, and in 1465 the entire church was burnt out by an accidental fire. Largely rebuilt by 1506, the abbey of Bury St Edmunds settled into a quieter existence until dissolution in 1539. Subsequently stripped of all valuable building materials and artefacts, the abbey ruins were left as a convenient quarry for local builders. A collection of wolf skulls were discovered at the site in 1848.

The ruins are owned by English Heritage and managed by St Edmundsbury Borough Council.

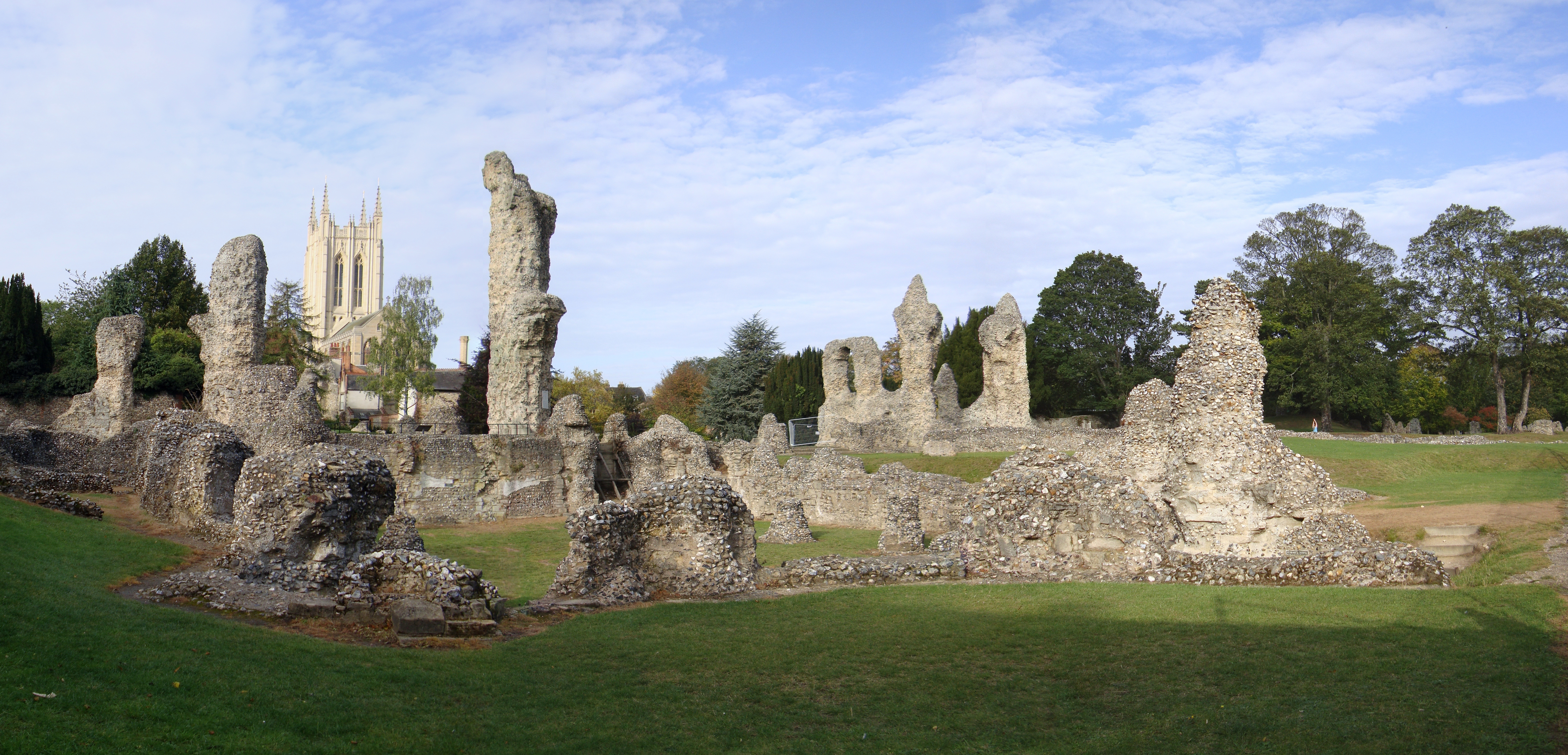
Panorama of the ruins of the abbey church, with the new Millennium Tower of St Edmundsbury Cathedral in the background

== Abbey Gardens ==
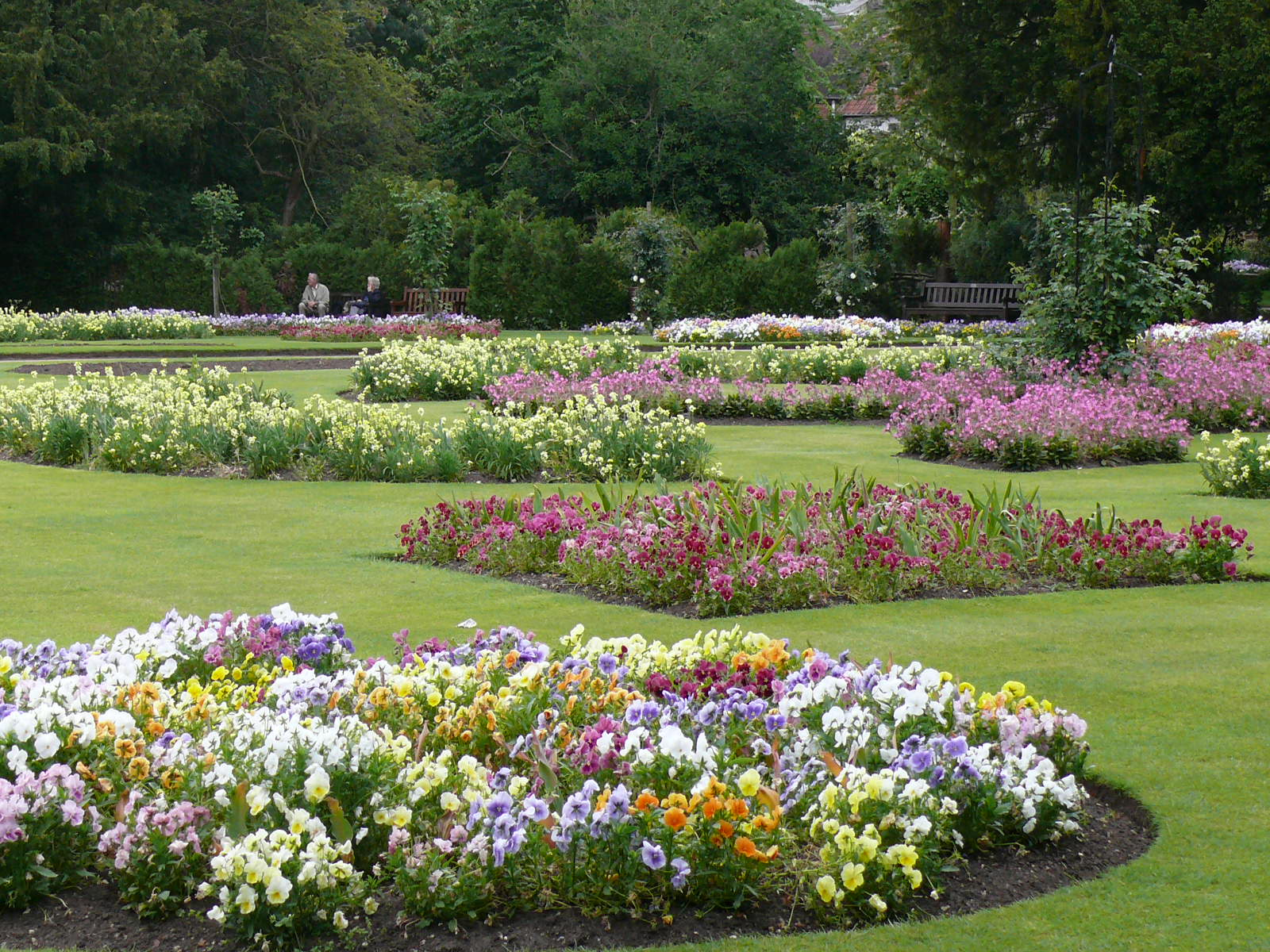
The gardens

The Abbey Gardens are currently owned and managed by West Suffolk Council in conjunction with English Heritage. The maintenance of and improvements to the gardens are carried out by the council as well as support from volunteers.

The Abbey Gardens surrounding the ruins had an "Internet bench" installed in 2001, which people could use to connect laptops to the Internet. It was the first bench of its kind. There is a sensory garden for the visually impaired.

== Burials ==
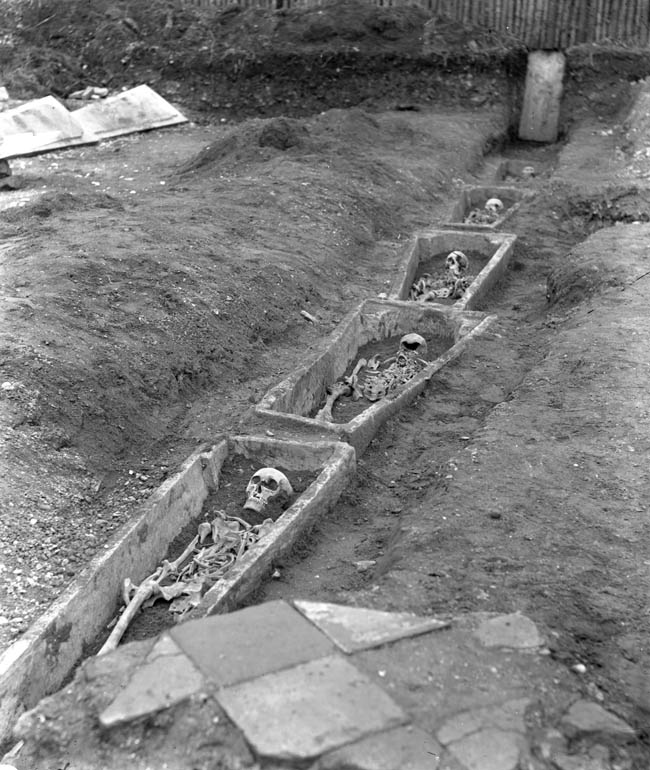
Graves of abbots of the abbey, 1903 (from front to rear): Edmund of Walpole (1248–1256); Henry of Rushbrooke (1235–1248); Richard of the Isle of Ely (1229–1234); Samson (1182–1211); and Ording (1148–1157).

- Jurmin
- Edmund the Martyr
- Alan Rufus (d. 1093) was first buried outside the south door, then reinterred inside the abbey church.
- Thomas of Brotherton (d. 1338) Earl of Norfolk, Lord Marshal of England, son of King Edward I and Margaret of France, buried in the choir.
- Mary Tudor, Queen of France, Princess of England (d. 1533), (daughter of King Henry VII), whose remains were removed to nearby St Mary's Church at the dissolution five years later.

In the late 19th century, a manuscript discovered in Douai, France revealed the burial location of eighteen of the abbey's abbots. The antiquary and author Montague R. James, an authority on the abbey's history, published an account of the abbey that made extensive use of the Douai Register. He oversaw an excavation of the chapter house, and on New Year's Day 1903 the coffins and remains of five of the abbots were shown to the public.

== Holders of corrodies ==
- until 1511: Hugh Denys of Osterley(d.1511), Groom to the King's Close Stool of Henry VII.
- from 1511: William Gower, Groom of the Chamber to Henry VIII.

== See also ==
- Abbot of Bury St Edmunds
- Bury St Edmunds Cross
- Bury Bible
- Herman of Bury's On the Miracles of St Edmund
- John Taxster & al.'s Bury Chronicle
- Jocelin of Brakelond's Chronicle of the Abbey of St. Edmunds
- Annals of St Neots, actually composed at Bury St Edmunds Abbey
- Thomas Carlyle's Past and Present
