= William of Malmesbury =

English monk and chronicler (c. 1095–1143)

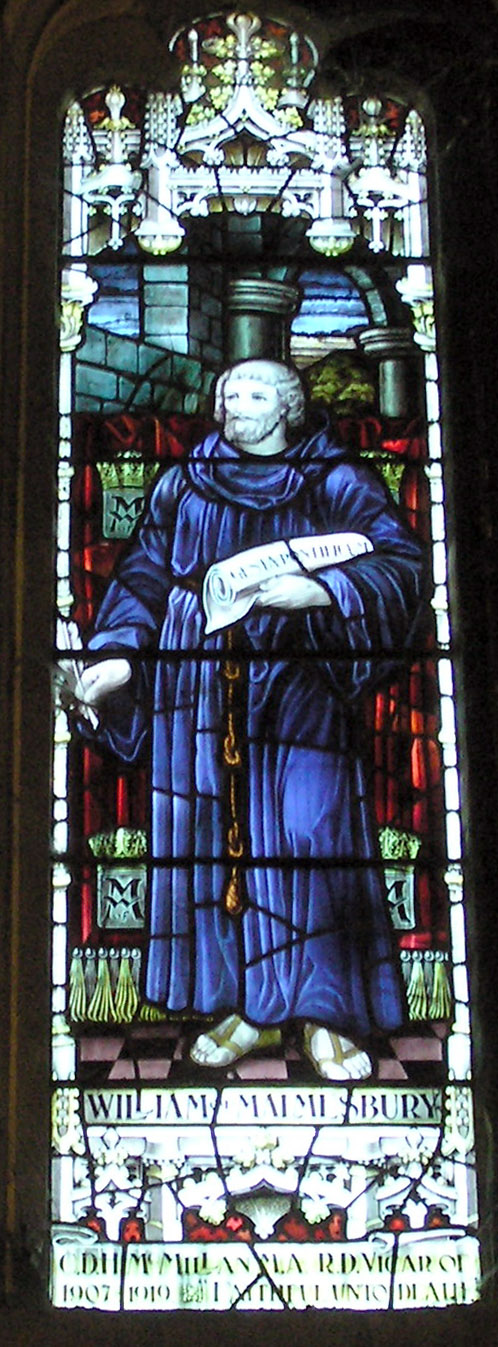
Stained-glass window showing William, installed in Malmesbury Abbey in 1928 in memory of Rev. Canon C. D. H. McMillan, vicar of Malmesbury from 1907 to 1919

William of Malmesbury (Latin: Willelmus Malmesbiriensis; c. 1095 – c. 1143) was the foremost English historian of the 12th century. Modern historian C. Warren Hollister described him as "a gifted historical scholar and an omnivorous reader, impressively well versed in the literature of classical, patristic, and earlier medieval times as well as in the writings of his own contemporaries. Indeed William may well have been the most learned man in twelfth-century Western Europe."

William was born about 1095 or 1096 in Wiltshire, England. His father was Norman and his mother English. He spent his whole life in England and his adult life as a monk at Malmesbury Abbey in Wiltshire.

== Biography ==
Though the education William received at Malmesbury Abbey included a smattering of logic and physics, moral philosophy and history were the subjects to which he devoted the most attention. The earliest fact which he records of his career is that he assisted Abbot Godfrey (1081–1105) in collecting a library for the use of the community, and the evidence shows that William had first-hand knowledge of at least four hundred works by two hundred-odd authors. During the course of his studies, he amassed a collection of medieval histories, which inspired in him the idea for a popular account of English history modelled on the Historia ecclesiastica gentis Anglorum (Ecclesiastical History of the English People) of Bede. William's obvious respect for Bede is apparent even within the preface of his Gesta Regum Anglorum, where he professes his admiration for the man.

In fulfilment of this idea, William completed in 1125 his Gesta Regum Anglorum ("Deeds of the English Kings"), consciously patterned on Bede, which spanned from AD 449 to 1120. He later edited and expanded it up to the year 1127, releasing a revision dedicated to Robert, Earl of Gloucester. This "second edition" of the Gesta Regum, "disclosing in his second thoughts the mellowing of age", is now considered one of the great histories of England.

William wrote of William the Conqueror in Historia Anglorum:

He was of just stature, extraordinary corpulence, fierce countenance; his forehead was bare of hair; of such great strength of arm that it was often a matter of surprise, that no one was able to draw his bow, which himself could bend when his horse was in full gallop; he was majestic whether sitting or standing, although the protuberance of his belly deformed his royal person; of excellent health so that he was never confined with any dangerous disorder, except at the last; so given to the pleasures of the chase, that as I have before said, ejecting the inhabitants, he let a space of many miles grow desolate that, when at liberty from other avocations, he might there pursue his pleasures. His anxiety for money is the only thing on which he can deservedly be blamed. This he sought all opportunities of scraping together, he cared not how; he would say and do some things and indeed almost anything, unbecoming to such great majesty, where the hope of money allured him. I have here no excuse whatever to offer, unless it be, as one has said, that of necessity he must fear many, whom many fear.

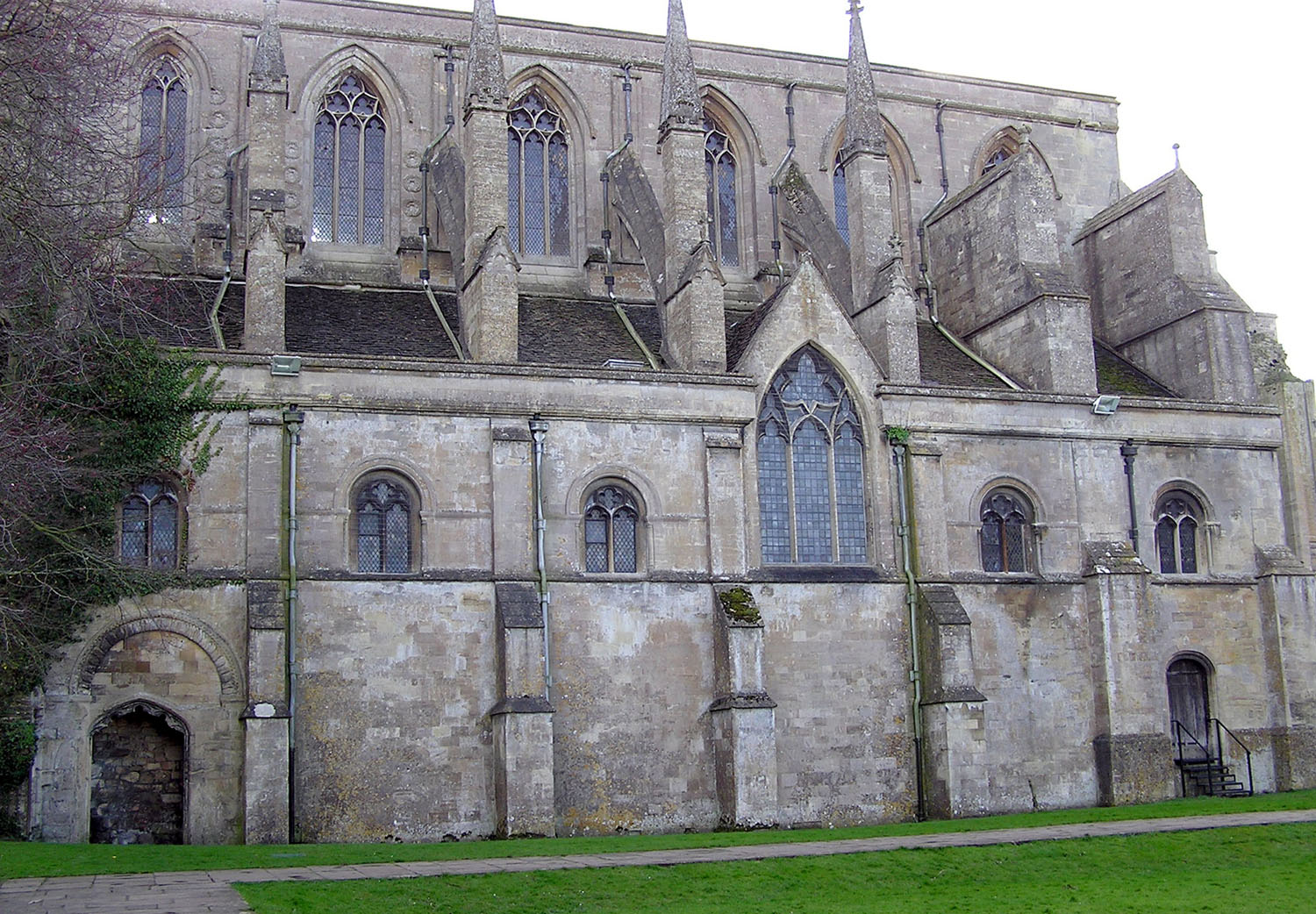
Malmesbury Abbey in Wiltshire, completed in 1180; it remains in use as the parish church of Malmesbury.

William's first edition of the book was followed by the Gesta Pontificum Anglorum (Deeds of the English Bishops) in 1125. For this vivid descriptive history of abbeys and bishoprics, dwelling upon the lives of the English prelates saints, notably the learned wonder-working Aldhelm, abbot of Malmesbury, William travelled widely in England. He stayed at Glastonbury Abbey for a time, composing On the Antiquity of the Glastonbury Church for his friend, the abbot Henry of Blois who was also the Bishop of Winchester. (Among the first works to mention SS Fagan and Deruvian, its present form is notably marred by anachronistic forgeries and additions.)

At a point before the onset of the Anarchy in 1139, William made the beneficial acquaintance of Roger, Bishop of Salisbury, who possessed Malmesbury Castle. Such a beneficial local connection, combined with the positive reception of William's Gesta Regum, led to an offer of the position of abbot of Malmesbury in 1140, which William declined, preferring his duties as a librarian and scholar. His one public appearance was made at the council of Winchester in 1141, in which the clergy declared for the Empress Matilda.

Beginning about 1140, William continued his chronicles with the Historia Novella, or "modern history", a three-book chronicle that ran from 1128 to 1142, including important accounts of the Anarchy of King Stephen's reign. This work breaks off with an unfulfilled promise that it would be continued: presumably William died before he could redeem his pledge. William also wrote a history of his abbey and several saints' lives.

== Significance ==
William is considered by many, including John Milton, to be one of the best English historians of his time, and remains known for strong documentation and his clear, engaging writing style. A strong Latin stylist, he shows literary and historiographical instincts which are, for his time, remarkably sound. He is an authority of considerable value from 1066 onwards; many telling anecdotes and shrewd judgments on persons and events can be gleaned from his pages. Some scholars criticise him for his atypical annalistic form, calling his chronology less than satisfactory and his arrangement of material careless. Much of William's work on Wulfstan, Bishop of Worcester, is thought to derive from a first-hand account from Coleman, a contemporary of Wulfstan. William merely translated the document from Old English into Latin. William's works are still considered invaluable and, despite these shortcomings, he remains one of the most celebrated English chroniclers of the twelfth century.

William's descriptions of religious communities, even though they "resort to the hagiographic", especially about Benedictine convents such as Shaftesbury, Nunnaminster, and Wilton, give insights into the lives of nuns in England during the central Middle Ages. He observed their practices, which included their obedience to their leaders' directives, their care for and veneration of relics, their organization and participation in their practices of prayer and intercessions on the behalf of those in and out of their communities, and their reputations among the laity and their peers in other religious communities. His extensive travels throughout England also allowed him to compare the communities he studied and to accurately assess these communities' "size, wealth, vibrancy, and rigour". According to medieval scholar and historian Katie Ann-Marie Bugyis, "He was clearly impressed by the practices of the women's monasteries he visited. By his telling, their sanctity and zeal equaled, if not surpassed, those of their male counterparts".

== Works ==
=== Printed works ===
- Gesta pontificum Anglorum
  - William of Malmesbury: Gesta pontificum Anglorum (Deeds of the English Bishops), Vol. I, Edited and Translated by M. Winterbottom and R. M. Thomson, Oxford University Press, 2007. ISBN 0-19-820770-0
  - William of Malmesbury: Gesta pontificum Anglorum (Deeds of the English Bishops), Vol. II: General Introduction and Commentary, by R. M. Thomson, Oxford University Press, 2007. ISBN 0-19-922661-X
  - William of Malmesbury: The Deeds of the Bishops of England [Gesta Pontificum Anglorum], Translated by David Preest, Boydell Press, 2002. ISBN 0-85115-884-6
- Gesta regum Anglorum
  - William of Malmesbury: Gesta regum Anglorum (Deeds of the Kings of the English), Vol. I, Edited and Translated by R. A. B. Mynors, R. M. Thomson and M. Winterbottom, Oxford University Press, 1998. ISBN 0-19-820678-X
  - William of Malmesbury: Gesta regum Anglorum (Deeds of the Kings of the English), Vol. II: General Introduction and Commentary, by M. Winterbottom and R. M. Thomson, Oxford University Press, 2002, ISBN 0-19-820709-3
  - (Willielmi Monachi Malmesburiensis): De Gestis Regum Anglorum, Libri V; Historiae Novellae, Libri II; De Gestis Pontificum Anglorum, Libri IIII., in Rerum Anglicarum Scriptores Post Bedam Praecipui, ex vetustissimis codicibus manuscriptis nunc primum in lucem editi (G. Bishop, R. Nuberie & R. Barker Typographij Regii, London 1596). digitized ed. Migne, Patrologia Latina vol. 179.
  - William of Malmesbury, Chronicle of the Kings of England, translated by Rev. John Sharpe, edited by J. A. Giles, London: George Bell and Sons, 1904.
- Historia Novella
  - William of Malmesbury: Historia Novella (The Contemporary History), Edited by Edmund King, Translated by K. R. Potter, Oxford University Press, 1999. ISBN 0-19-820192-3
- De antiquitate Glastoniensis ecclesiae (63–1126)
- Liber super explanationem Lamentationum Ieremiae prophetae
  - William of Malmesbury (2011). Liber super explanationem Lamentationum Ieremiae prophetae. CCCM. Vol. 244. Michael Winterbottom, Rodney M. Thomson (eds.). Turnhout: Brepols. ISBN 978-2503540870. Translation: William of Malmesbury (2013). On Lamentations. Corpus Christianorum in Translation. Vol. 13. Michael Winterbottom (trans.). Turnhout: Brepols. ISBN 9782503548494.

=== Unprinted extant works ===
Among these are:

- Miracles of the Virgin
- Liber super explanationem lamentationum Yeremiae prophetae
- An abridgment of Amalarius' De divinis officiis
- De dictis et factis memorabilibus philosophorum
- An epitome of the Historia of Haymo of Fleury and some other works, historical and legal
- Lives of the English Saints

The manuscripts of these works are to be found some in the British Library and the Bodleian Library.

=== Lost works ===
- A Vita Sancti Patricii and Miracle Sancti Benigni are mentioned in the prologue to the book on Glastonbury
- A metrical life of St Ælfgyfu is quoted in the Gesta pontificum
- Chronica tribus libellis are mentioned in the prologue to the Historia novella, and a fragment of them is apparently preserved in the British Library Lansdowne manuscripts 436.
- John Leland gave extracts from an Itinerarium Johannis abbatis, describing the journey of Abbot of Malmesbury John to Rome in 1140 (Leland, Collectanea, iii. 272).
