= Church of St John Lateran, Hengrave =

St John Lateran, Hengrave
- St John Lateran, Hengrave
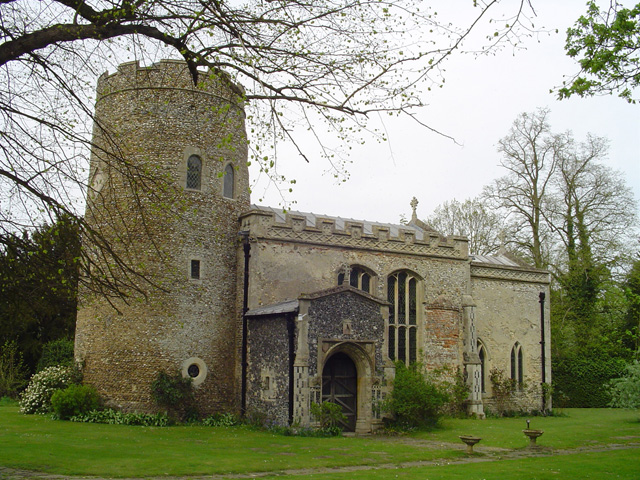
- Church of St John Lateran, Hengrave, April 2007

- Location in Suffolk
- 52°17′06″N 0°40′25″E
- OS grid reference: TL 824 685
- Location: Suffolk
- Country: England
- Denomination: Anglican

History
- Founded: Tower may be pre-Norman
- Dedication: St John Lateran

Architecture
- Heritage designation: Grade I
- Designated: 14 July 1955
- Architectural type: Church

The Church of St John Lateran, Hengrave is the former parish church of Hengrave, Suffolk. In 1589 this parish was consolidated with that of adjacent Flempton, and since then it has solely been used as a place of interment for the residents of Hengrave Hall, who have ensured the church is properly maintained. The church is a Grade I listed building.

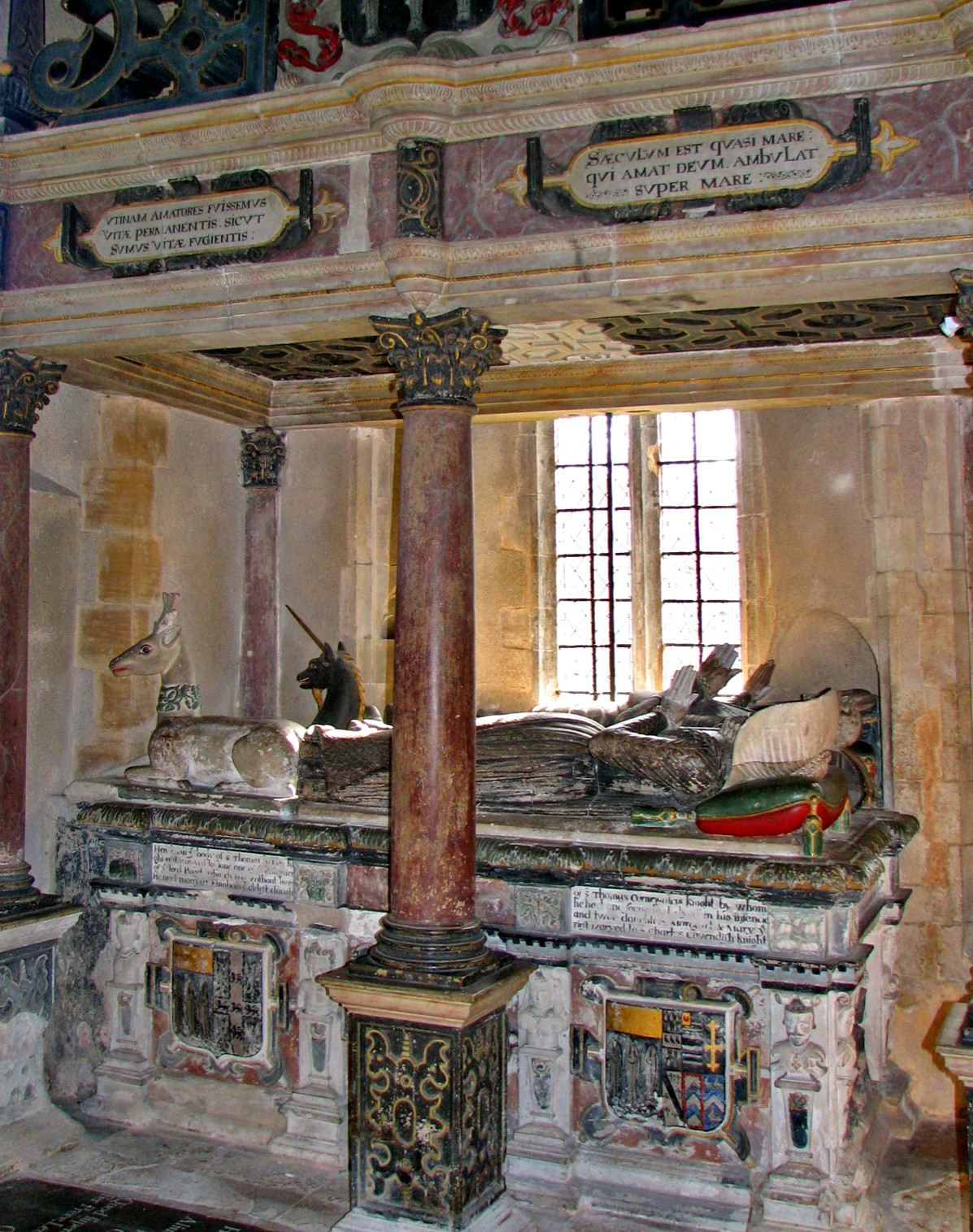
Monument to Sir Thomas Kytson and his two wives

Local antiquarian Samuel Tymms described the church at a meeting of the Bury and West Suffolk Archaeological Institute held at Hengrave Hall on 22 July 1852:

"It is a small edifice with a round tower and south porch. The tower, now completely enveloped in ivy, is the oldest portion of the building, though one of the latest edifices of the kind. Its diameter is larger than is usual in these peculiar towers. The south porch, which remains nearly in its original state, was built, as an inscription over the inner doorway tells us, by the de Hemegraves, at the end of the 14th or beginning of the 15th century, when the church was probably rebuilt by them. The embattled parapet on the south side of the church exhibits some interesting details. Upon one of the battlements are the arms in flint work of de Hemegrave, Argent, a chief indented Gules; on another those of St. Edmund's Bury, a crown pierced with two arrows; and on a third the monogram IHS in Greek characters-between the initials of Mary and Joseph. From a fragment of an inscription still remaining, this ornamental work would appear to have been made by one John Hull, of London, and who may probably have been interred in this church. The fresco painting of St. Christopher carrying the infant Jesus, engraved in the History of Hengrave, has since been destroyed by damp.
The monumental memorials are numerous. One to Margaret, Countess of Bath, and her three husbands, has the effigies of herself and Lord Bath, on an altar tomb, under a heavy flat canopy supported by six pillars, and that of Sir Thomas Kytson, her first husband, on a step in front of her tomb. A monument of corresponding form and size, but more elegant in design, has the effigies of the second Sir Thomas Kytson and his two wives. A mural tablet records the death and displays the effigy in a kneeling posture of Thomas-Darcy, the hope of the noble house of Rivers; and a monument of white marble against the east wall has a finely sculptured bust of Sir Thomas Gage, 3rd Baronet. There are also several slabs of grey marble in the pavement of the church, bearing arms and memorial inscriptions of the Gage family."

== Illustrations to The History of Hengrave ==
John Le Keux and John Chessell Buckler provided a number of engravings of Hengrave church for The History and Antiquities of Hengrave in Suffolk (1822) by the historian John Gage Rokewode who lived in Hengrave Hall. This is the book referred to by Samuel Tymms.

Tomb of Margaret Countess of Bath (Le Keux)

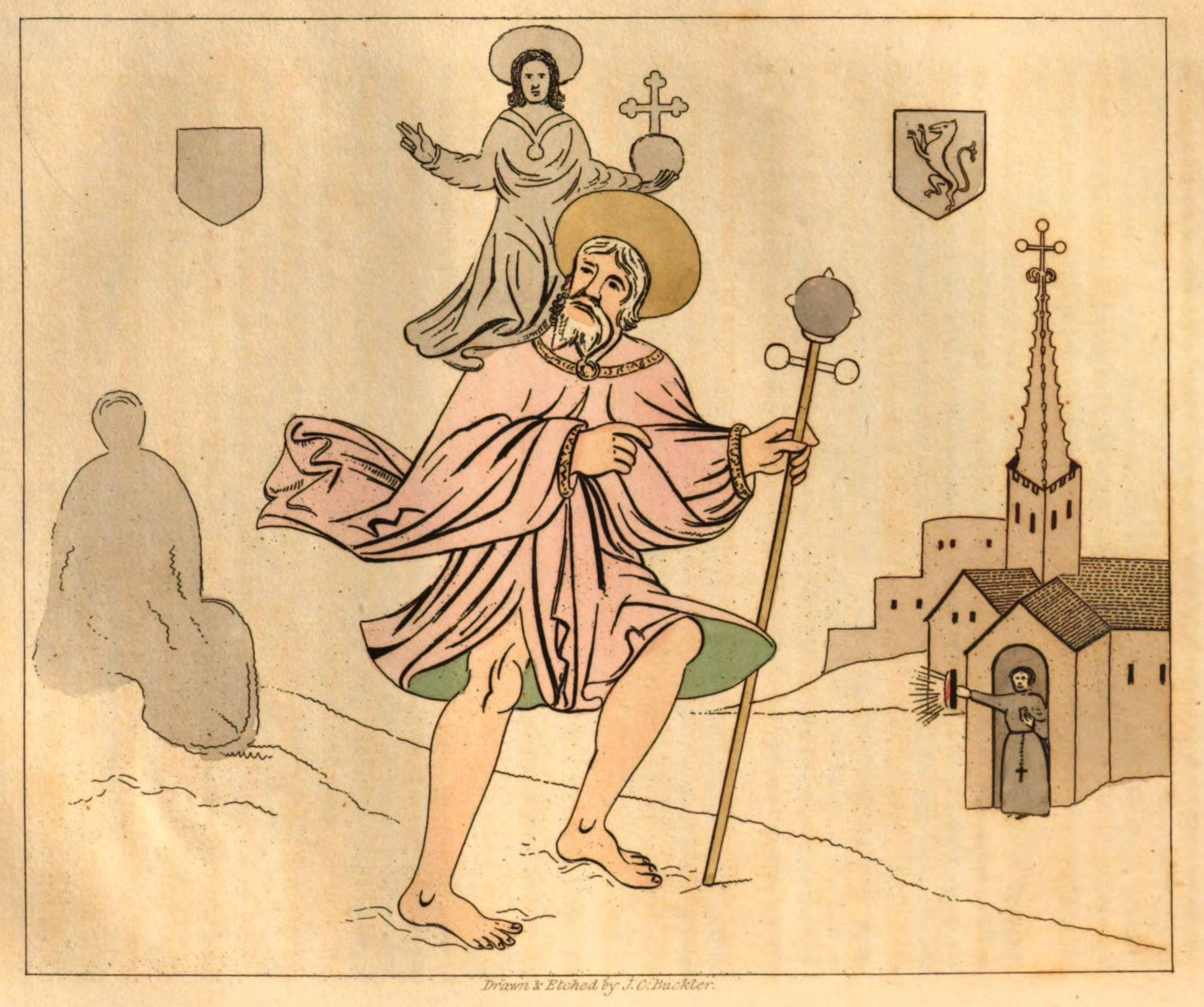
Fresco mentioned by Samuel Tymms, destroyed by damp before 1852

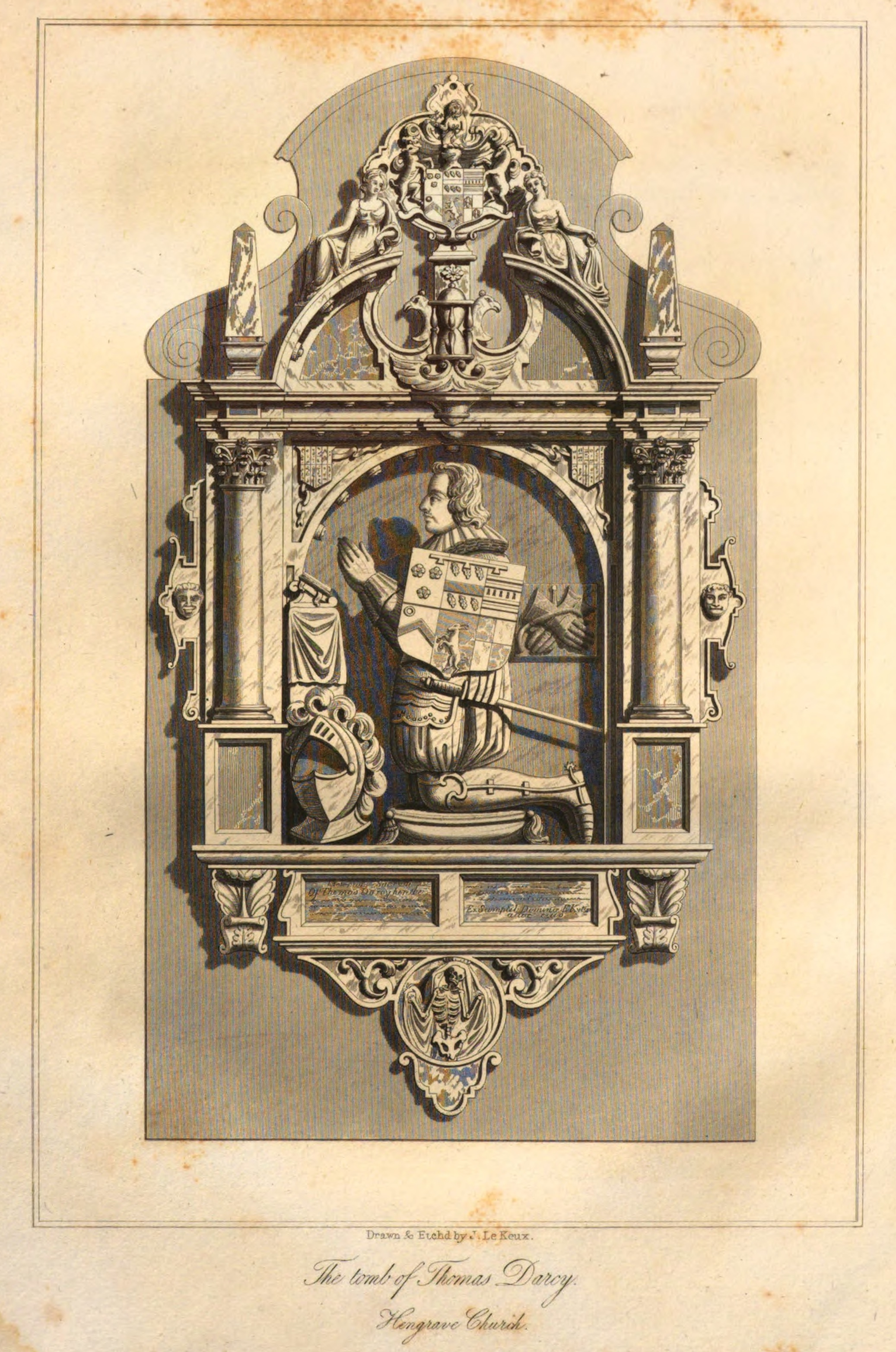
Tomb of Thomas Darcy (died 1614) son of Thomas Darcy, 1st Earl Rivers and Mary Kitson
