= Abbot of Bury St Edmunds =

List of medieval abbots of Bury St Edmunds Abbey in England

Abbot of Bury St. Edmunds was the title used by the head of the Benedictine monastery in Bury St. Edmunds Abbey in the county of Suffolk, England. The following table lists the abbots from the foundation of the abbey in 1020 until its dissolution in 1539.

	Abbots of Bury St. Edmunds	From	To	Notes
1	Uvius/ Ufi	1020	1044	Founded St George's Priory, Thetford.
2	Leofstan	1044	1065	
3	Baldwin	1065	1097	
4	Robert I	1100	1102	Son of Hugh d'Avranches, Earl of Chester
5	Robert II	1102	1107	
6	Alebold of Jerusalem	1114	1119	
7	Anselm of St Saba	1121	1146 (Note: 1148 is given in one source.)	Nephew of Anselm of Canterbury. Elected bishop of London in 1138, but was not consecrated bishop
8	Ording	1146	1156	See note on dates of Anselm above - elected abbot while Anselm was bishop-elect (1138), then re-elected after Anselm's death
9	Hugo/Hugh I	1157	1180	Refounded St George's Priory, Thetford c. 1160. Discussed at length in the Chronicle of Jocelin of Brakelond.
10	Samson of Tottington	1182	1211	Discussed at length in the Chronicle of Jocelin of Brakelond.
11	Hugh of Northwold	1215	1229	1213 locally, 1215 with Papal consent; became Bishop of Ely
12	Richard	1229	1234	Also known as 'Richard of the Isle of Ely'
13	Henry of Rushbrook	1235	1248	
14	Edmund of Walpole	1248	1256	
15	Simon of Luton	1257	1279	
16	John of Northwold	1279	1301	
17	Thomas of Tottington	1302	1312	
18	Richard of Draughton	1312	1335	
19	William of Bernham	1335	1362	William died the last day of February 1361 – 1362
20	Henry of Hunstanton	1362	1362	Henry's abbacy was very brief
21	John of Brinkley	1362	1379	John of Brinkley elected on Henry's demise
22	John of Timworth	1379	1389	The Papal nominee for Abbot was Edmund Bromefield for 5 years of this time
23	William of Cratfield	1390	1415	
24	William of Exeter	1415	1429	
25	William Curteys	1429	1446	
26	William Babington	1446	1453	
27	John Bohun	1453	1469	
28	Robert Ixworth	1469	1474	See Ixworth Priory, Ixworth
29	Richard Hengham	1474	1479	
30	Thomas Rattlesden	1479	1497	See Rattlesden
31	William Cadenham	1497	1513	
32	John Reeve	1513	1539	Sometimes 'John Reeve of Melford'; died on 31 March 1540

On 4 November 1539, the abbey was surrendered. The surrender is signed by Abbot John Reeve, Prior Thomas Ringstede (alias Dennis), and by forty-two other monks. All were awarded pensions, of varying amounts.
