= Samson of Tottington =

English Benedictine monk

Samson of Tottington (1135–1211) was an English Benedictine monk who became Abbot of Bury St Edmunds. He oversaw the expulsion of Jews from Bury St Edmunds after a 1190 pogrom during Holy Week. His life was later used by Thomas Carlyle as a leadership model in his book Past and Present.

== Life ==
Samson was born at Tottington, near Thetford, in 1135. After taking his MA in Paris, Samson returned to Norfolk and taught in the school at Bury St Edmunds. In 1160 the monks of St Edmunds sent him to Rome on their behalf to appeal against an agreement of the abbot and Henry II of England, and for this, on his return Abbot Hugh promptly clapped him into gaol. By 1166 Samson was a fully professed monk, and in the years following, he filled several offices - those of sub-sacrist, guestmaster, pittancer, third prior, master of novices, and master of the workmen. Jocelyn de Brakelond was a noviciate under Samson's tutelage before taking monastic vows and becoming a chronicler of the Abbey of Bury St Edmunds under Samson's predecessor and Samson himself.

Hugh died in 1180, and on the advice of Eysteinn of Nidaros, who resided in the abbey between 1181 and 1182, Samson was elected abbot of Bury St Edmunds on 21 February 1182. For the rest of his life, Samson worked for the abbey, for the town, and the State. He regained the right of joint election of two bailiffs for the abbey and town, "improved the monastery’s financial position by paying off debts, stamping out independent borrowing by his monks,... increasing revenues from the abbey’s holdings," rebuilt the choir, constructed an aqueduct, and added the great bell tower at the west end of the abbey and two flanking towers. He defended the liberties of the town. He helped the townsfolk to obtain a charter and encouraged new settlers. The monks resisted Samson's concessions of market rights to the townsmen but were no match for their abbot. A hospital at Babwell and a free school for poor scholars were also gifts of Samson to the townspeople.

Samson was abbot at the time of the 1190 massacre of Jews in Bury St Edmunds. This occurred two days after the Palm Sunday massacre in Clifford's Tower, York on 16 March. Immediately thereafter, he himself oversaw and arranged for the expulsion of the remaining Jewish townspeople, asking in his letter to King Richard I "for written permission to expel the Jews from St Edmund’s town, because everything in the town... belonged by right to St Edmund: therefore, either the Jews should be St Edmund’s men, or he should banish them from the town". These events may have been linked to local political rivalries, as Samson was trying to undermine his rival William the Sacrist, who had business links with the town's Jews.

Samson also seems to have promoted the cult of the alleged boy-martyr Robert of Bury at a time when the abbot of Norwich was attempting to assert authority over Bury. Norwich was the home of the rival boy-martyr William of Norwich.

Pope Lucius III made Samson a judge delegate in ecclesiastical causes; he served on the commission for settling the quarrel between Hubert Walter and the monks of Canterbury; and on the Royal Council in London, where he sat as a baron, opposing the efforts of William of Longchamp to curtail the rights of the Benedictine Order.

Samson died in 1211, having ruled his abbey for almost thirty years.

== Legacy ==
Thomas Carlyle wrote an extended essay on Samson and leadership entitled "The Ancient Monk" in his 1843 Past and Present, based on his portrayal in J.G. Rokewode's 1840 edition of Jocelin of Brakelond's Chronicle.
