= Thomas Tomlins =

Thomas Tomlins may refer to:

- Sir Thomas Edlyne Tomlins (1762–1841), English legal writer
- Thomas Edlyne Tomlins (1803–1875), English legal writer

== See also ==
- Thomas Tomlin (disambiguation)
