= Diana Greenway =

British historian and academic

Diana Greenway FBA
- Born: 1937 (age 88–89)

Academic work
- Discipline: Historian
- Sub-discipline: medieval history; palaeography; English history
- Institutions: Institute of Historical Research; University of London

Diana Eleanor Greenway (born 1937) is a British retired historian and academic, who specialised in medieval history and palaeography. She taught at the Institute of Historical Research from 1964 to 2003, and she was Reader in Medieval History (1993–1998) and then Professor of Medieval History (1998–2003) at the University of London.

== Honours ==
In 2001, Greenway was elected a Fellow of the British Academy (FBA), the United Kingdom's national academy for the humanities and social sciences. In 2011, she was made a Freeman of the City of London.

== Selected works ==
- (ed.) Charters of the Honour of Mowbray, 1107–1191. Oxford: Oxford University Press. 1972. ISBN 978-0197259269.
- (ed. with Christopher Holdsworth & Jane E. Sayers) Tradition and Change: Essays in Honour of Marjorie Chibnall Presented by Her Friends on the Occasion of her Seventieth Birthday. Cambridge: Cambridge University Press. 1985. ISBN 978-0521257930.
- (ed. with Jane E. Sayers) Jocelin of Brakelond (1989), Chronicle of the Abbey of Bury St Edmunds, Oxford: Oxford University Press.
- (ed. with E. B. Fryde, S. Porter, and I. Roy) Handbook of British Chronology (3rd ed.). Cambridge: Cambridge University Press. 2003. ISBN 9780521563505.
- (ed. with Leslie Watkiss) The Book of the Foundation of Walden Monastery. Oxford: Oxford University Press. 1999. ISBN 978-0198203308.
- (ed. with Charles Travis Clay) Early Yorkshire Families. Cambridge: Cambridge University Press. 2013. ISBN 978-1108058377.
