= Chedburgh =

Village in Suffolk, England

Coordinates: 52.189°N 0.617°E

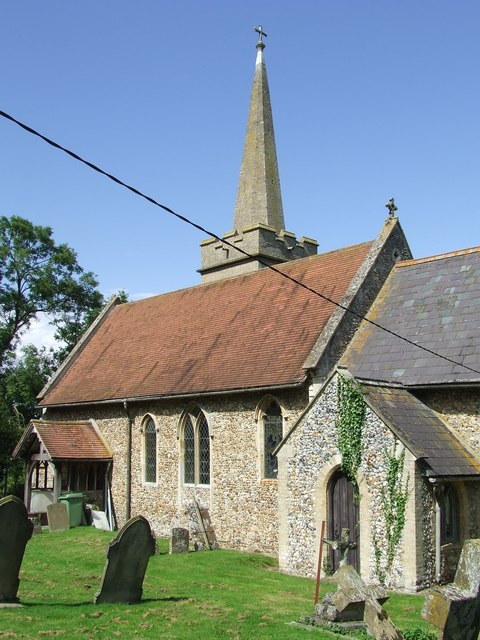
- All Saints' Church

- Location within Suffolk
- Population: 650; 597 (2011)
- District: West Suffolk
- Shire county: Suffolk
- Region: East
- Country: England
- Sovereign state: United Kingdom
- Post town: Bury St Edmunds
- Postcode district: IP29
- Police: Suffolk
- Fire: Suffolk
- Ambulance: East of England
- UK Parliament: West Suffolk

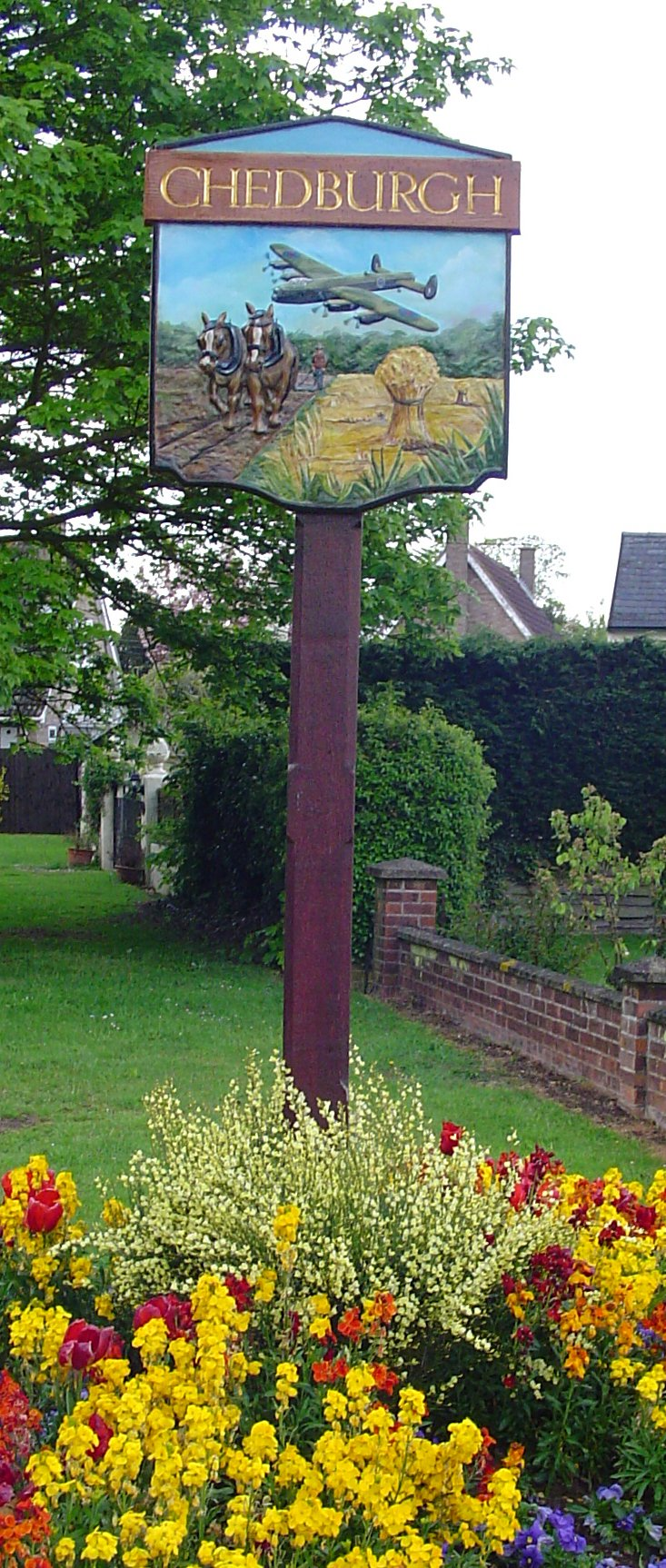
Signpost in Chedburgh

Chedburgh is a village and civil parish in the West Suffolk district of Suffolk in eastern England. Located on the A143 around five miles south-west of Bury St Edmunds, in 2005 its population was 650, reducing to 597 at the 2011 Census.

Great Wood Hill, the highest point in Suffolk, is around 1.7 km (1.1 mi) south of Chedburgh.

== History ==
All Saints Church, Chedburgh is a Grade II* listed building. It is a medieval church, which was subject to major alterations in the nineteenth century. In 1842 the gault brick tower was built with rendered Gothic style openings, a brick spire and crenellated parapets; the chancel was almost completely reconstructed including a mid fourteenth century style window on the eastern side, a roof with ribbed panels in the ceiling a gabled vestry and moulded cornices. Lord Arthur Hervey, president of the Bury and West Suffolk Archaeological Institute was vicar here from 1832 to 1856.

== RAF Chedurgh ==
On 7 September 1942 South of the Bury Road, RAF Chedburgh opened, in No. 3 Group RAF Bomber Command. Major construction work was carried out by John Laing & Son Ltd., and built to Class A standard, the airfield had three concrete runways, 05-23 at 2,000 yards and 12-30 and 17-35 both at 1,400 yards. In October 1942 214 Squadron moved in flying Short Stirling bombers. Various squadrons followed until December 1946. The airfield site was sold in October 1952, although some hangars were still visible in the 1970s. The Bury Road Business Park is located on the former technical site.
