= Athenaeum, Bury St Edmunds =

Listed building and event venue in Bury St Edmunds, England

Coordinates: 52°14′39″N 0°42′58″E

Athenaeum
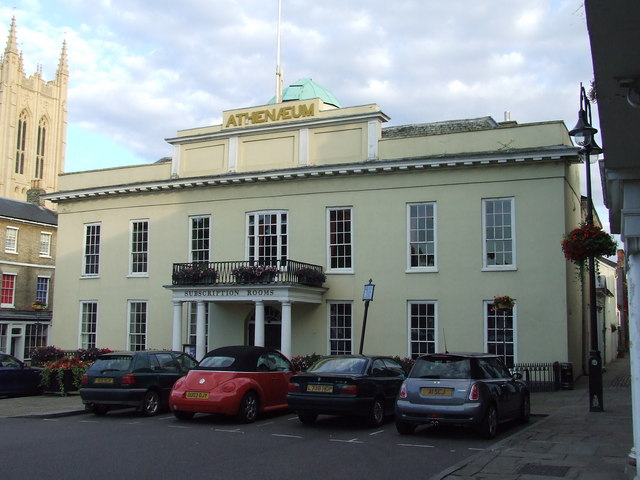
- The Athenaeum, July 2007
- Interactive map of Athenaeum
- Address: Angel Hill, Town Centre, Bury St Edmunds, Suffolk, IP33 1LU

Construction
- Rebuilt: 1801

The Athenaeum is a Grade I listed building and a major venue in Bury St Edmunds, England. Even before substantial rebuilding the site was used as an Assembly Rooms for the town in the eighteenth century. The building was rebuilt in 1789 and further developed in 1804 under a subscription scheme established by its new owner, James Oakes. Lord Arthur Hervey founded the Athenaeum in 1853, originally operating out of Bury St Edmunds Guildhall. In 1854 the organisation moved into the former Assembly Rooms, since then the building has been known as the Athenaeum.

The building and its attached railings are a Grade I listed building.
