= Hengrave =

Village in Suffolk, England

Coordinates: 52.2857°N 0.6757°E

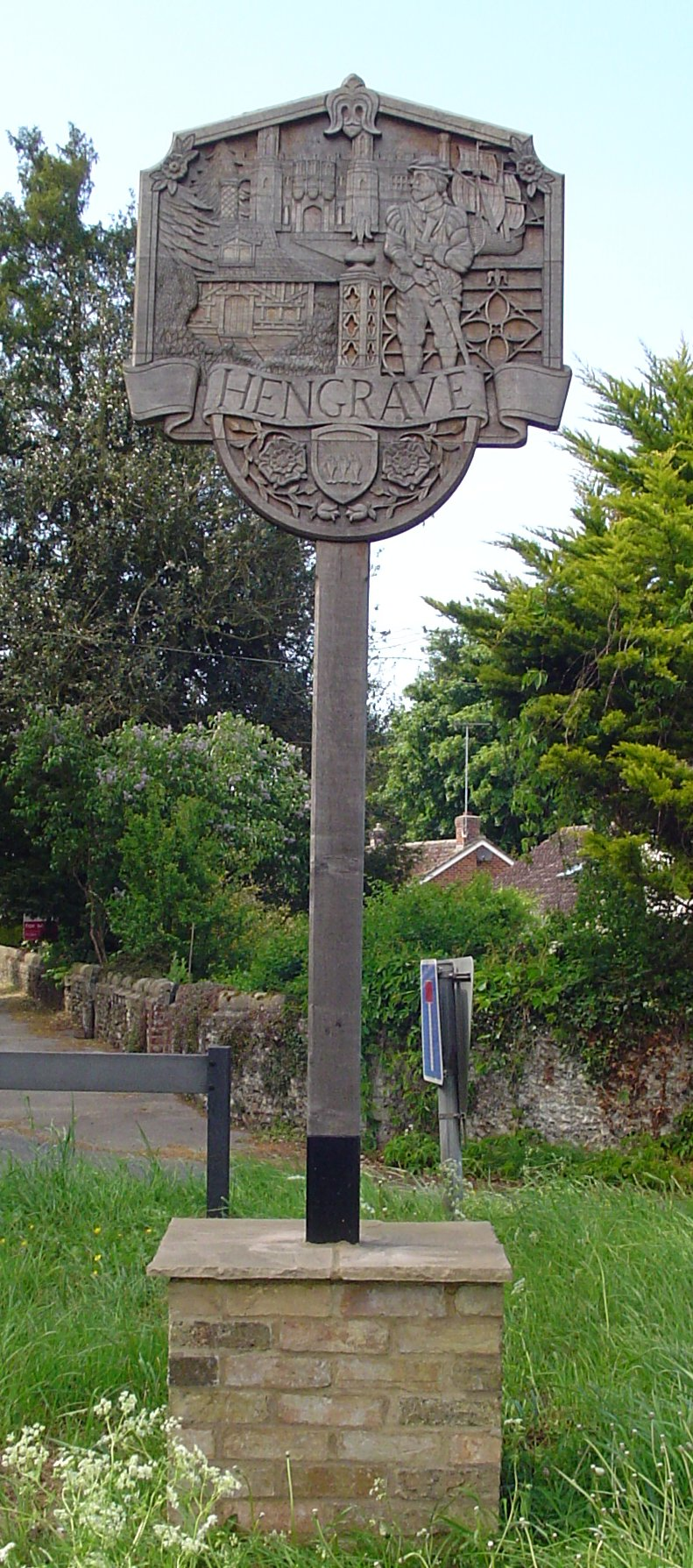
- Signpost in Hengrave

- Location within Suffolk
- Population: 173 (2011 Census)
- OS grid reference: TL825686
- District: West Suffolk district
- Shire county: Suffolk
- Region: East
- Country: England
- Sovereign state: United Kingdom
- Post town: Bury St Edmunds
- Postcode district: IP28
- Dialling code: 01284
- Police: Suffolk
- Fire: Suffolk
- Ambulance: East of England
- UK Parliament: West Suffolk (UK Parliament constituency)

Hengrave is a small village and civil parish in the West Suffolk district, in the county of Suffolk, England. It is to the North of the town of Bury St Edmunds along the A1101 road. It is surrounded by the parishes of Flempton, Culford, Fornham St Genevieve, Fornham All Saints and Risby. The River Lark provides the North East boundary of the parish.

== History ==
The village is recorded in the Domesday Book in 1086 as Hemegretham meaning the homestead or village of Hemma's meadow. This is derived from the old Frisian word grēd meaning meadow or pasture. The parish was located in Thingoe Hundred.

== Biodiversity ==
The botanist Thomas Gage lived in Hengrave Hall and produced an account of plants, moss and lichen which he had found in the village, which was published in The History and Antiquities of Hengrave in Suffolk (1822) by his uncle, the historian John Gage Rokewode, who also lived in Hengrave Hall.

== See also ==
- Hengrave Hall
- Church of St John Lateran, Hengrave
