= Thomas Edlyne Tomlins (1803–1875) =

English attorney and legal writer

Thomas Edlyne Tomlins (bapt. 26 September 1803 – 17 May 1875) was an English legal writer.

== Life ==
Tomlins was born in London, the son of Alfred Tomlins, a clerk in the Irish exchequer office, Paradise Row, Lambeth, and his wife Elizabeth. He was the nephew of Sir Thomas Edlyne Tomlins. He entered St. Paul's School, London on 6 February 1811, and was admitted to practice in London as an attorney in the Michaelmas term of 1827.

He died in Islington, London, in the spring of 1875.

== Works ==
Tomlins was the author of:

- A Popular Law Dictionary, London, 1838.
- Yseldon, a Perambulation of Islington and its Environs, pt. i. London, 1844; complete work, London, 1858.
- The New Bankruptcy Act (23 & 24 Vic. cap. 134) complete, with an Analysis of its Enactments, London, 1861.

He also edited Sir Thomas Littleton's Treatise of Tenures (1841); revised Alexander Fraser Tytler's Elements of General History (1844); translated the Chronicle of the Abbey of St. Edmunds of Jocelin of Brakelond (1844) for the Popular Library of Modern Authors; and contributed to the Shakespeare Society A New Document regarding the Authority of the Master of the Revels which had been discovered on the patent roll (Shakespeare Society Papers, 1847, iii. 1–6).
