= Tottington, Norfolk =

Deserted village in Norfolk, England

Coordinates: 52.52441°N 0.79189°E

Tottington
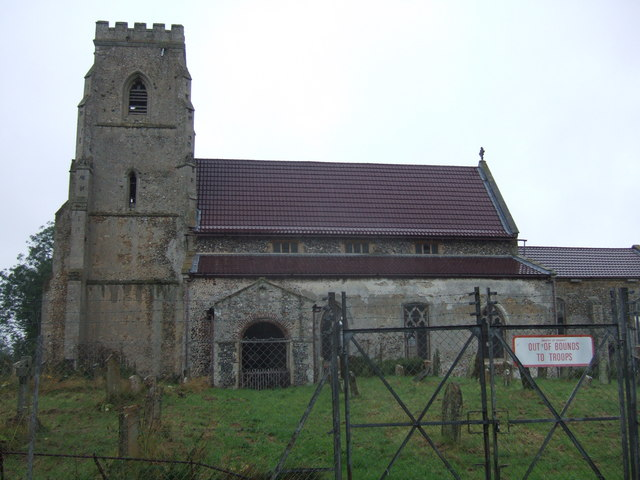
- St Andrew's Church in Tottington

- Location within Norfolk
- Area: 13.12 km^{2} (5.07 sq mi)
- Population: 0 (2001 Census)
  - Density: 0/km^{2} (0/sq mi)
- OS grid reference: TL895955
- District: Breckland
- Shire county: Norfolk
- Region: East
- Country: England
- Sovereign state: United Kingdom
- Post town: THETFORD
- Postcode district: IP25
- Police: Norfolk
- Fire: Norfolk
- Ambulance: East of England
- UK Parliament: South West Norfolk

Tottington is a deserted village and civil parish in the English county of Norfolk. It is situated some 6.2 miles (10.0 km) north of the town of Thetford and 25 miles (40 km) south-west of the city of Norwich. Any population at the 2011 Census was included in the civil parish of Thompson.

== Name ==
Tottington means "farm/settlement of Tota's people" or perhaps, "farm/settlement connected with Tota".

== History ==
Tottington has an entry in the Domesday Book of 1086. In the great book Tottington is recorded by the name of Totintuna, meaning "the town or settlement of Tota's people". The main land holder was Ralph FitzHelwin. The survey also states there are fifteen mares. Samson of Tottington was Abbot of Bury St Edmunds from 1182 to 1211, and Thomas of Tottington filled the same role from 1302 to 1311.

=== Evacuation ===
During the Second World War, the village was taken over by the British Army when it was incorporated into the Stanford Battle Area. The military ranges were needed to prepare Allied infantry for Operation Overlord, the invasion of Normandy in 1944. Though some villagers were said to be happy to give up their homes to help the British war effort, the majority were less than enthusiastic with a number of heated village meetings and some refusing to leave the area. This was the subject of a book written by Lucilla Reeve, one such person who refused to leave, under the pseudonym 'A Norfolk Woman' called Farming, on a Battle Ground.

However, after the war, the former villagers were not allowed to return to their homes by the War Office. Most of the inhabitants of Tottington rented their houses and farmed the land belonging to the Walsingham estates. Though they had been promised that they could return to their homes after the war, the government later reneged on the promise and bought the land, threatening Walsingham with a compulsory purchase order. As the majority of the inhabitants were not landowners, they received very little in compensation, were put into council housing and many lost their livelihoods. They continued to fight for many years to return to their homes and farmland but the beginnings of the Cold War and the need for dedicated training areas removed all chances of a return.

Since the evacuation, the village and its parish remain within the Ministry of Defence's Stanford Training Area. Access is not permitted without special permission.

== The Parish Church of St Andrew ==
The church is situated at the northern end of the village. The roof of the church is clad in blast-proof sheeting which was installed to protect the structure of the church. The original pantiles are stored inside the church ready to be restored if the village is given back to the public. The churchyard is surrounded by wire fencing to protect the church from the military manoeuvres.

In October 2009, a World War II veteran who had been born in the village was buried in St Andrew's churchyard after permission for the interment was granted by the Ministry of Defence. It was the first burial in the churchyard for more than fifty years.

== Governance ==
The civil parish has an area of 5.07 square miles (13.1 km^{2}) and in the 2001 census had no inhabitants. For the purposes of local government, the parish falls within the district of Breckland.
