= Thomas Tomlin =

Thomas Tomlin may refer to:

- Thomas Tomlin, Baron Tomlin, British judge
- Tommy Tomlin, American football player

== See also ==
- Thomas Tomlins (disambiguation)
