= Suffolk Institute of Archaeology & History =

The Suffolk Institute of Archaeology and History is the county archaeological society for the county of Suffolk, England. In 1848 the Bury and West Suffolk Archaeological Institute was established at Bury St Edmunds in the former county of West Suffolk. In 1853 it extended its area of focus to cover both counties of West and East Suffolk (united since 1974).

It has no permanent premises, but is administered by officers and an elected council, under the patronage of a president. It holds excursions and meetings for lectures, has a field group, and publishes a twice-annual newsletter and an annual volume of proceedings. The latter usually contains four leading articles, shorter contributions, and a section describing the archaeological discoveries and excavations of the preceding year.

The institute is open to public membership by payment of a subscription fee. It can sponsor archaeological or historical research through moderate grants, and has a role of advocacy within the county. It has a membership of approximately 1,000, including corporate memberships.

== Sources ==
- Plunkett, S. J. (1998). "The Suffolk Institute of Archaeology: Its Life, Times and Members" (PDF). Proceedings of the Suffolk Institute of Archaeology and History. 39: 165–207.
