= Assembly rooms =

Public gathering space in which social events and balls were held

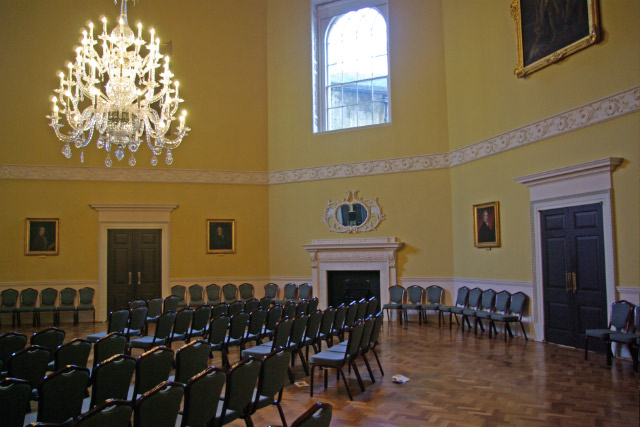
The Assembly Rooms, Bath

In Great Britain and Ireland, especially in the 18th and 19th centuries, assembly rooms were gathering places for members of the higher social classes open to members of both sexes. At that time most entertaining was done at home and there were few public places of entertainment open to both sexes besides theatres (and there were few of those outside London). Upper class men had more options, including coffee houses and later gentlemen's clubs.

Major sets of assembly rooms in London, in spa towns such as Bath, and in important provincial cities such as York, were able to accommodate hundreds, or in some cases over a thousand people for events such as masquerade balls (masked balls), assembly balls (conventional balls), public concerts and assemblies (simply gatherings for conversation, perhaps with incidental music and entertainments) or Salons. By later standards these were formal events: the attendees were usually screened to make sure no one of insufficient rank gained admittance; admission might be subscription only; and unmarried women were chaperoned. Nonetheless, assemblies played an important part in the marriage market of the day.

A major set of assembly rooms consisted of a main room and several smaller subsidiary rooms such as card rooms, tea rooms and supper rooms. On the other hand, in smaller towns a single large room attached to the best inn might serve for the occasional assembly for the local landed gentry.

By the 1900s, people became more accepting of women entering public places, and new venues for entertainment arose, such as public dance halls and nightclubs. Also to some extent they were supplanted by the ballrooms of major hotels as British hotels became larger from the railway age onwards.

== Examples ==
=== England ===
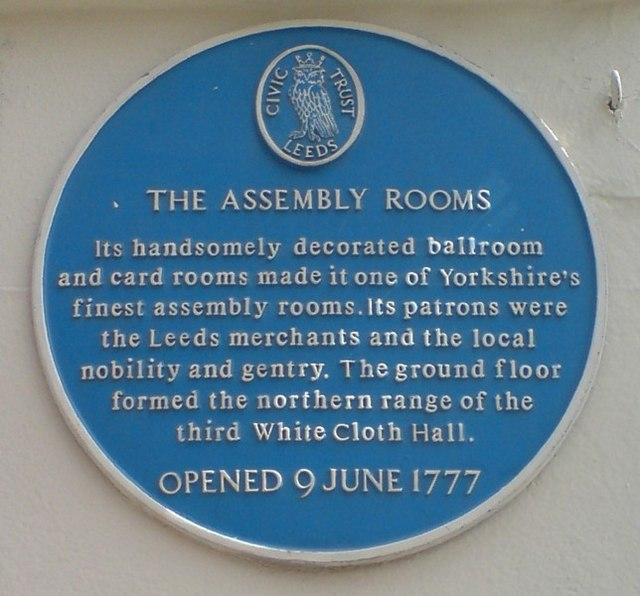
Blue Plaque, The Assembly Rooms, Assembly Street, Leeds

- London
  - Almack's - London's most exclusive assembly rooms.
  - The Pantheon - an architecturally grander but more briefly fashionable set of assembly rooms in London.
- Bath Assembly Rooms - the assembly rooms in England's most fashionable spa.
- The Lower Assembly Rooms, Bath, demolished in 1933.
- Assembly Rooms, Boston, Lincolnshire
- Victoria Rooms (Bristol).
- Athenaeum, Bury St Edmunds.
- Buxton Crescent, the centre of the crescent contains the town's assembly rooms.
- Shire Hall, Hertford.
- Wellington Rooms, Liverpool.
- Assembly Rooms, Ludlow.
- Assembly Rooms, Newcastle - built in 1776 in Newcastle upon Tyne, one of the finest examples of Georgian architecture in Newcastle's Grainger Town.
- Newark Town Hall, the 18th century town hall included the assembly rooms within the building.
- Assembly House, Norwich.
- Lion Hotel, Shrewsbury contained the town's assembly rooms.
- Assembly Rooms, Surbiton in Surbiton, Surrey.
- York Assembly Rooms - a notable building designed by Lord Burlington.
- Assembly Rooms, Leeds
- Assembly Rooms Glastonbury

=== Scotland ===
- Music Hall, Aberdeen
- Dumfries Assembly rooms, c. 1825 - elegant building by Walter Newall, Architect, of Dumfries
- Assembly Rooms (Edinburgh)
- New Assembly and Concert Rooms, 1796, Glasgow, later the home of the Athenaeum (demolished by new owners, the General Post Office, in 1892)

=== Wales ===
- Cardiff City Hall, which includes the Assembly Rooms on the first floor.

== Public gardens ==
London also had a number of outdoor "public gardens" where similar entertainments took place. They were more commercial establishments and tended to have less exclusive rules on admission. Each had at least one major indoor space for balls and the like. See: Marylebone Gardens, Vauxhall Gardens, Ranelagh Gardens and Cremorne Gardens.

== See also ==
- Assembly hall
