= Elizabeth Sophia Tomlins =

Elizabeth Sophia Tomlins (1763–1828) was an English novelist and occasional poet.

She was born in 1763. In 1797, her brother, later Sir Thomas Edlyne Tomlins (1762–1841), published Tributes of Affection by a Lady and her Brother (London, 8vo), a collection of short poems, most of them by her. Besides contributing several pieces to various periodical publications, she was the author of several novels, of which the most popular was The Victim of Fancy, an imitation of Goethe's Werther. Others were The Baroness d'Alunton, and Rosalind de Tracy, 1798, 12mo. She also translated the History of Napoleon Bonaparte from one of the works of Louis Pierre Anquetil. Tomlins died at The Firs, Cheltenham, on 8 August 1828 (Gent. Mag. 1828, ii. 471).
