= Baldwin (abbot of Bury St Edmunds) =

11th-century English monk, doctor, and abbot

- Abbot of Bury St Edmunds
- Elected: 1065
- Term ended: 1097 or 1098

Personal details
- Died: 1097 or 1098
- Denomination: Catholic

Baldwin (died c. 1097) was a French monk and royal physician. He became a monk in France before coming to England to serve as King Edward the Confessor's doctor. He served as a prior before becoming abbot of Bury St Edmunds in 1065. As abbot he promoted the cult of Edmund the Martyr and secured the abbey's independence from the bishops of Thetford. He continued to serve as royal physician to two more kings of England and also rebuilt parts of the abbey before dying around 1097.

== Early life ==
Baldwin was born at Chartres, and was educated as a physician in Alsace. He became a monk at St Denis Abbey in France. It is unknown when Baldwin became King Edward the Confessor's doctor. The historian Frank Barlow argues that he must have served the king for some time before being rewarded with the office of abbot. He became prior of Deerhurst Priory before becoming abbot, but the exact date is unknown. He was also prior of a monastery at Leberaw (now in Alsace, France).

== Abbot ==
Baldwin was appointed as abbot of Bury St Edmunds in 1065, on 19 August. Baldwin appears to have been the only non-English abbot appointed by Edward during his reign. Baldwin occurs as a witness on two forged charters dated to Christmas 1065. The witness lists for these two charters may be genuine, having been copied from a legitimate document to lend authenticity to the forgeries. If genuine, they would show that Baldwin was at Edward's last court before the king's death.

After the death of Edward and the succession of King Harold Godwinson in early 1066, Baldwin provided soldiers to support Harold in his defence against other claimants to the English throne.

== After the Conquest ==
After the Norman Conquest in 1066, Baldwin received a confirmation of the abbey's title to all their lands; however the new king, William the Conqueror, ordered Baldwin to surrender to him any lands held by men who had fought against him and who had died in that resistance. Baldwin continued to serve as a royal doctor to William. He also defended East Anglia against Danish incursions after the Conquest, as well as against general disorder there from after-effects of the Conquest.

In 1071 Baldwin secured from Pope Alexander II the right to have any bishop of the abbey's choice perform episcopal functions for the abbey, rather than the more usual method of having the diocesan bishop perform these functions. This effectively made the abbey free of supervision by the bishops of Thetford. This privilege was challenged in 1081 but upheld by the king.

Baldwin also served as King William II's doctor. In 1094 Baldwin oversaw the completion of the rebuilding of the choir of the monastic church. He asked the king for permission to dedicate the new building and translate the relics of Edmund the Martyr into the new choir. The king at first agreed, then changed his mind and said in December 1094 that while the translation could proceed, the consecration should not. But the king appears to have changed his mind again in early 1095, and on Sunday 29 April 1095 both the translation and the consecration took place. Besides Edmund's relics, the remains of two other saints – Botulf and Firmin – were also translated in a ceremony overseen by Walkelin, the Bishop of Winchester. The sermon that Walkelin preached was twice interrupted – once by a miraculous cure of a knight injured by the large crowd, and second by a large rainstorm that came, according to witnesses, in response to prayers to Saint Edmund to end a drought. The bishop of Thetford, Herbert Losinga, protested against this usurpation of his normal right to consecrate the church, but his protests were countered by the papal privilege of 1071 and the royal confirmation of that papal document.

== Death and legacy ==
Baldwin died around Christmas 1097, with Florence of Worcester giving the date as 29 December. However, the Anglo-Saxon Chronicle in version E gives his death year as 1098.

Baldwin may have been the indirect source of King William II's favourite oath, "By the Face of Lucca", as Baldwin visited the cathedral of St Martin in Lucca on a visit to Rome. Baldwin later gave some relics of St Edmund to the cathedral, leading the cathedral's canons to promote the cult of Edmund there. The Holy Face of Lucca was a relic held by the cathedral at Lucca, and Baldwin may have described the relic to the king, leading him to adopt the oath. Baldwin was active in promoting the cult of Edmund in other ways. He claimed that any who attacked the abbey would be struck with headaches, and supposedly one man was driven mad by the headaches after attacking the monastery.
