= Lord Arthur Hervey =

English Anglican Bishop (1808–1894)

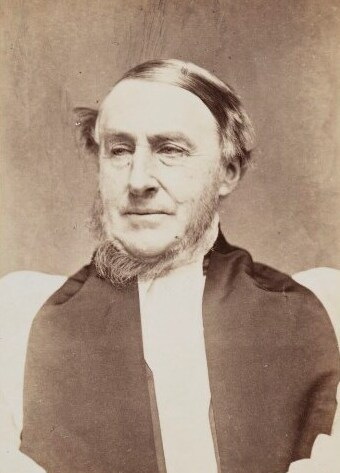
Hervey in 1874

Lord Arthur Charles Hervey (20 August 1808 – 9 June 1894) was an English bishop who served as Bishop of Bath and Wells from 1869 to 1894. He was usually known by his aristocratic courtesy title, "Lord", rather than the style appropriate to a bishop, the Right Reverend.

== Background and education ==
Hervey was the fourth son of Frederick Hervey, 1st Marquess of Bristol, by Elizabeth Albana Upton, daughter of Clotworthy Upton, 1st Baron Templetown. His paternal grandfather was Frederick Hervey, 4th Earl of Bristol, the Bishop of Derry. He was born at his father's London house, 6 St James's Square, on 20 August 1808. From 1817 to 1822, he lived abroad with his parents, chiefly in Paris, and was taught by a private tutor. He entered Eton College in 1822 and remained there until 1826. He entered Trinity College, Cambridge, in 1827, and after a residence of two years and a half, obtained a first class in the classical tripos and graduated B.A. in 1830.

== Career ==
Having been ordained both deacon and priest in October 1832, Hervey was instituted in November to the small family living of Ickworth-cum-Chedburgh, Suffolk, with which he was associated until 1869. Chedburgh, being in 1844 separated from Ickworth and joined to Horningsheath or Horringer, he also became curate of Horringer until in 1856 he was instituted to the rectory which he held with Ickworth. He was active in clerical work, took a leading part in the organisation of educational institutions in Bury St. Edmunds such as the Bury and West Suffolk Archaeological Institute of which he was the President. He seems to have been the first to propose a system of university extension. In 1862 he was appointed archdeacon of Sudbury.

On the resignation of Lord Auckland, Bishop of Bath and Wells, in 1869, he was offered the bishopric on the recommendation of William Ewart Gladstone, and was consecrated on 21 December. He remained in the post until his death in 1894. He was a moderate evangelical.

== Works ==
Hervey was a linguist, and wrote some antiquarian papers. He was one of the committee of revisers of the Authorised Version of the Old Testament, which sat 1870–1884, and in 1885 received the honorary degree of D.D. from the university of Oxford in recognition of his services. He contributed largely to William Smith's Dictionary of the Bible and to the Speaker's Commentary. Besides sermons and lectures, charges and pamphlets, he was author of The Genealogies of our Lord (1853).

== Family ==
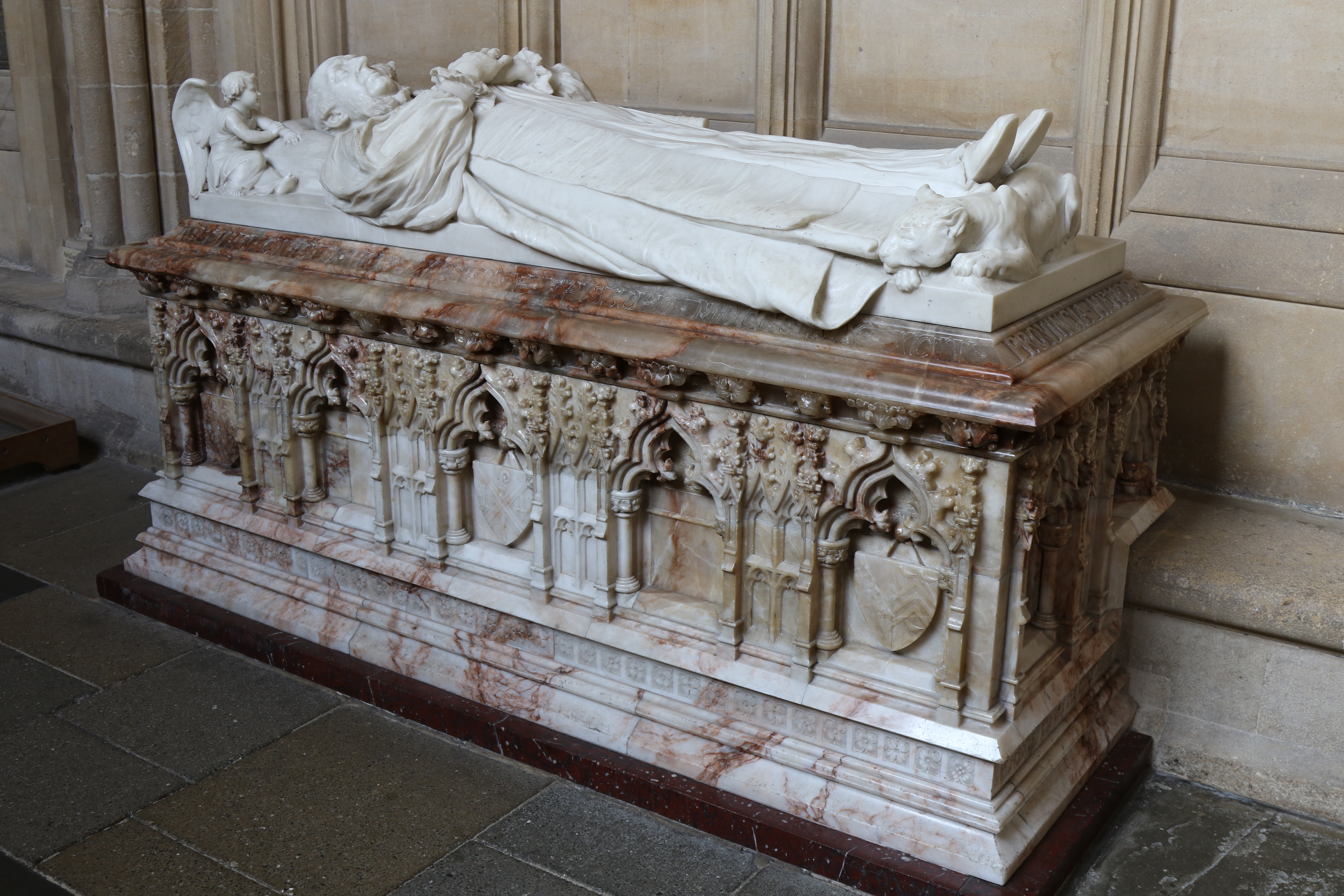
Monument in Wells Cathedral

Hervey married Patience Singleton, daughter of John Singleton (born Fowke), of Hazeley, Hampshire, and Mell, Drogheda, on 30 July 1839. They had thirteen children:

- John Frederick Arthur Hervey (1840 - 1926)
- Sarah Elizabeth Harriet Hervey (1842 - 1877)
- George Henry William Hervey (1843 - 1933)
- Eliza Augusta Caroline Hervey (1845 - 1861)
- Sydenham Henry Augustus Hervey (1846 - 1946)
- Katherine Patience Georgiana Hervey (1848-1915), on 9 April 1872 married on Charles Hoare, son of the banker, Henry Hoare, in Wells
- Arthur Hervey (1850 - 1850)
- Constantine Rodney William Hervey (1850 - 1949)
- Arthur Henry Wriothesley Hervey (1851 - 1889)
- Patience Mary Hervey (1853 - 1914) married Charles Rowland Palmer-Morewood, 17 July 1873
- James Arthur Hervey (1854 - 1948)
- Caroline Augusta Hervey (1857 - 1949)
- Frederica Mary Lucy Hervey (1859 - 1860)

He died in Hackwood House, near Basingstoke, the house of his son-in-law, Charles Hoare, on 9 June 1894, in his eighty-sixth year, and was buried in Wells.

Church of England titles
Preceded by The Lord Auckland	Bishop of Bath and Wells; 1869–1894	Succeeded by George Kennion
