= Bury and West Suffolk Archaeological Institute =

The Bury and West Suffolk Archaeological Institute was a victorian organisation established in 1848 in Bury St Edmunds, Suffolk. It had a lively existence for five years until 1853, when the local activities concerning antiquaries and natural historians were reorganised, leading to the foundation of the Athenaeum, Bury St Edmunds and the Suffolk Institute of Archaeology & History.

== Quarterly General Meetings ==
The business of the society was conducted through Quarterly General Meetings.

=== 1st meeting: Bury, 8 June 1848 ===
The first was held in Bury St Edmunds Guildhall in the room which housed the West Suffolk Library on 8 June 1848. A number of clergymen were present and the journalist William Bodham Donne. Samuel Tymms, who had been very active in organising the meeting was appointed honorary secretary. Various objects were displayed by a number of members, and Tymms read his paper on "Notes on the Medical History of Bury, from the time of Abbot Baldwin", and a letter from Clare, Suffolk was read out highlighting local antiquities in the expectation of the society visiting the town.

=== 2nd meeting: Clare, 14 September 1848 ===
The second meeting was indeed held in Clare where the party visited the castle, where Tymms delivered a presentation about that building. They were then hosted by Colonel Baker at his home, Clare Priory. After a tour of various notable locations in the town, the meeting assembled in a room in Half Moon public house, where further artefacts were put on display and a number of donations to the Institute were made.

=== 3rd meeting: Bury, 14 December 1848 ===
For the third meeting the Institute returned to Bury and was chaired by Lord Arthur Hervey.

=== 4th meeting: Bury, 15 March 1849 ===
The fourth meeting was also the Annual meeting at which the Committee provided its report. It was chaired by Thomas Gery Cullum, one of the institutes vice presidents.

== Presentations ==
- 8 June 1848 "Notes on the Medical History of Bury, from the time of Baldwin by Samuel Tymms
- 14 September 1848 Clare Castle by Samuel Tymms

== See also ==
- Athenaeum, Bury St Edmunds
- Suffolk Institute of Archaeology & History
