= John Gage Rokewode =

British historian (1786–1842)

John Gage Rokewode FSA (13 September 1786 – 14 October 1842 at Claughton Hall, Lancashire) was a historian and antiquarian.

== Life ==
He was the fourth son of Sir Thomas Gage of Hengrave, Suffolk and took the name Rokewode in 1838 when he succeeded to the Rokewode estates. John was a descendant of a maternal line from Ambrose Rookwood. He was educated at Stonyhurst College, and having studied law under Charles Butler he was called to the bar, but never practiced, preferring to devote himself to antiquarian pursuits. He was elected a fellow of the Society of Antiquaries of London in 1818, and was director from 1829 till 1842. He was also elected a Fellow of the Royal Society in April 1824.

== Works ==
In 1822 he published The History and Antiquities of Hengrave in Suffolk and in 1838 The History and Antiquities of Suffolk. His edition of Jocelin de Brakelond's Chronicle of the Abbey of St. Edmunds, published by the Camden Society in 1840, furnished Thomas Carlyle with much of his materials for Past and Present (1843). Many papers by him appeared in Archaeologia, many of these being republished as separate pamphlets, including the description of the Benedictionals of St. Æthelwold and of Robert of Jumieges; he also printed the genealogy of the Rokewode family with charters relating thereto in Collectanea Topographica et Genealogica, II. He contributed to the Orthodox Journal and the Catholic Gentleman's Magazine. The Gentleman's Magazine published a full list of his work with the Society of Antiquaries, these include,

- A Dissertation on St. Æthelwold's Benedictional, an illuminated manuscript of the tenth century, in Archæologia, xxiv. 1–117, with thirty-two plates;
- A Description of a Benedictional or Pontifical, called Benedictionarius Roberti Archiepiscopi, an illuminated manuscript of the tenth century in the public library at Rouen, ib. pp. 118–136;
- The Anglo-Saxon Ceremonial of the Dedication and Consecration of Churches, ib. xxv. 235–74;
- Remarks on the Louterell Psalter, printed, with six plates, in the Vetusta Monumenta, vol. vi.;
- A Memoir on the Painted Chamber in the Palace at Westminster,' printed, with fourteen plates, in the same volume of Vetusta Monumenta.

Many of his manuscripts were sold after his death with his valuable library. However, Sir Thomas Rokewode-Gage, 8th Baronet, retained many of these, which he donated to the library of the Bury and West Suffolk Archaeological Institute when it was established in 1848. The Society of Antiquaries possesses a bust of him by R. C. Lucas. He died suddenly while out shooting.
