= Thomas Edlyne Tomlins (1762–1841) =

Sir Thomas Edlyne Tomlins (4 January 1762 – 1 July 1841) was an English legal writer.

== Life ==
Born in London, he was the eldest son of Thomas Tomlins (d. 1815), solicitor and clerk to the Company of Painter-Stainers, descended from the family of Tomlins in the neighbourhood of Ledbury in Herefordshire and of Hereford. Thomas Edlyne was admitted a scholar at St Paul's School, London on 21 September 1769. He matriculated at The Queen's College, Oxford, on 27 October 1778, and was called to the bar by the society of the Inner Temple in the Hilary term of 1783.

For some years Tomlins was editor of the St. James's Chronicle, a daily newspaper, and on 30 May 1801 he was appointed counsel to the chief secretary for Ireland. In the same year he became parliamentary counsel to the Chancellor of the Exchequer for Ireland, a post which he retained until the union of the British and Irish treasuries in 1816. He was knighted at Wanstead House on 29 June 1814, on the recommendation of the Duke of Wellington, and in 1818 was appointed assistant counsel to the treasury. In Hilary term 1823 he was elected a bencher of the Inner Temple, and in 1827 he filled the office of treasurer to the society. In January 1831, on the Whigs coming into office, he retired from his post in the treasury.

Tomlins died on 1 July 1841 at St. Mary Castlegate, York.

== Works ==
Tomlins was the author of:

- A Familiar Explanation of the Law of Wills and Codicils, London, 1785; new edition, 1810.
- Repertorium Juridicum: a General Index of all Cases and Pleadings in Law and Equity hitherto published, London, 1786–7 (only the first part was published).
- Cases explanatory of the Rules of Evidence before Committees of Elections in the House of Commons, London, 1796.
- A Digested Index of the first Seven Volumes of Durnford and East's Term Reports in the Court of King's Bench from 1785 to 1798, London, 1799, 4th edit. carried down to 1810, published in 1812.
- Statutes at Large, 41 to 49 George III, being vols. i. ii. and iii. of the Statutes of the United Kingdom, London, 1804–10.
- The Whole Proceedings of the Court of Enquiry upon the Conduct of Sir Hew Dalrymple, London, 1808.
- Index to Acts relating to Ireland passed between 1801 and 1825, London, 1825; new edit. carried down to 1829, published in 1829.
- Plain Directions for proceeding under the Act for the Abolition of Imprisonment for Debt, 2nd edit., London, 1838.

He also superintended several editions of Giles Jacob's Law Dictionary; his last edition of it was joint work with Alexander Annesley. He edited Josiah Brown's Reports of Cases on Appeals and Writs of Error determined in the High Court of Parliament (London, 1803), and, as sub-commissioner of the records, took a major part in editing the Statutes of the Realm (9 vols. 1810–24). Jointly with his sister Elizabeth Sophia Tomlins he published a collection of short poems, Tributes of Affection by a Lady and her Brother, in 1797.

== Family ==
Elizabeth Sophia Tomlins (1763–1828) was his sister. Thomas Edlyne Tomlins (1804–1872) was his nephew.
