= Samuel Tymms =

English antiquarian

Samuel Tymms (27 November 1808, Camberwell - 29 April 1871 Lowestoft) was an English antiquarian, topographer, printer and publisher. He started his work in Bury St Edmunds, Suffolk in the nineteenth century.

== Family life ==
Samuel was the son of Thomas Tymms and Eliza Stuart. He married Mary Anne Jugg (1824-1883), of Ely on 10 July 1844. Together they had five children: Edmund Robert (1846-1922), Mary Jane (1849-1925), Edith Anna, Mildred Ann and Samuel.

== Career ==
Following an early article which appeared in the Gentleman's Magazine Tymms moved to Suffolk where he was employed on the Bury Post, based in Bury St Edmunds. In 1848 he played a major role in founding the Bury and West Suffolk Archaeological Institute of which he was the honorary secretary.
