= Chronicle of the Abbey of St. Edmunds =

History of Bury St Edmunds

The Chronicle of the Abbey of St Edmunds is a chronicle concerning the history of the Benedictine abbey at Bury St Edmunds in Suffolk, England, between the years 1173 and 1202. It was written either in 1198 or 1202 by Jocelin of Brakelond, a monk at the abbey.

John Gage Rokewode published an edition of the Latin chronicle in 1840. An annotated translation was then published by Thomas Edlyne Tomlins in 1844. Thomas Carlyle's Past and Present, contrasting medieval and modern culture, prominently featured Abbot Samson as presented by the Chronicle. Other editions include Ernest Clarke's in 1903 and Diana Greenway & Jane E. Sayers's in 1989.
