= Jocelyn de Brakelond =

12th and 13th-century English monk and chronicler

- Jocelinus de Brakelondia

Personal life
- Born: c. 1150s Bury St Edmunds, Suffolk, England
- Died: after 24 April 1215 Bury St Edmunds, Suffolk, England
- Flourished: 12th century
- Notable work: Chronicle of the Abbey of St Edmunds
- Other name: Jocelin de Brakelond

Religious life
- Religion: Catholic Church
- Order: Benedictine
- Church: Bury St Edmunds Abbey
- Profession: Monk, chronicler

Senior posting
- Period in office: late 12th–early 13th century

Jocelyn or Jocelin de Brakelond or Brakelonde (Latin: Jocelinus de Brakelondia; fl. 12th century) was an English Benedictine monk at Bury St Edmunds Abbey in Suffolk, England. He is only known through his work, the Chronicle of the Abbey of St. Edmunds, which narrates the fortunes of the monastery during the years from 1173 to 1202.

== Life ==
Jocelyn was a native of Bury St Edmunds. He took the habit of religion in 1173, during the abbacy of Hugo (1157–1180), through whose improvidence and laxity the abbey had become impoverished and the monks had lost discipline. He served his novitiate under Samson of Tottington, who was at that time master of the novices but afterwards became sub-sacrist and then, from 1182, abbot of the house. The fortunes of the abbey changed for the better with the election of Samson as Hugo's successor. Jocelyn became the abbot's chaplain within four months of the election, and in his chronicle, he claims he was with Samson night and day for the next six years.

== Work ==
Jocelyn's Chronicle of the Abbey of St. Edmunds describes the administration of Samson at considerable length. The picture which he gives of his master, although coloured by enthusiastic admiration, is singularly frank and intimate. It is all the more convincing since Jocelyn is no stylist. His Latin is familiar and easy to read. He thinks and writes as one whose interests are wrapped up in his house; and the unique interest of his work lies in the minuteness with which it describes the policy of a monastic administrator who was in his own day considered as a model.

Jocelyn has also been credited with an extant but unprinted tract on the election of Abbot Hugo (Harleian manuscript 1005, fol. 165); from internal evidence this appears to be an error. He mentions a (non-extant) work which he wrote, before the Cronica, on the miracles of Saint Robert of Bury, a boy found murdered in 1181 whose death during a period of rising anti-Semitism was blamed on the local Jews.
