= Listed buildings in Bury St Edmunds (eastern part) =

Civil Parish in Suffolk, England

Bury St Edmunds is a town and civil parish in the West Suffolk District of Suffolk, England. It contains 737 listed buildings that are recorded in the National Heritage List for England. Of these 32 are grade I, 41 are grade II* and 664 are grade II.

This list is based on the information retrieved online from Historic England. The quantity of listed buildings in Bury requires subdivision into geographically defined lists. This list includes all listed buildings near the Abbey in the eastern part of the town.

== Key ==
| Grade | Criteria |
|---|---|
| I | Buildings that are of exceptional interest |
| II* | Particularly important buildings of more than special interest |
| II | Buildings that are of special interest |

== Listing ==
| Name | Grade | Location | Type | Completed (Note: The date given is the date used by Historic England as significant for the initial building or that of an important part in the structure's description.) | Date designated | Grid ref. (Note: The grid reference is based on the British national grid reference system, sometimes known as OSGB36, used by the Ordnance Survey.) Geo-coordinates | Notes | Entry number (Note: The "List Entry Number" is a unique number assigned to each listed building and scheduled monument by Historic England.) | Image | Wikidata |
|---|---|---|---|---|---|---|---|---|---|---|
| Old Shire Hall and Magistrates Court | II | IP33 1RS, Bury St. Edmunds | | | 8 November 2018 | TL8576963970; 52°14′33″N 0°43′10″E | | 1460009 | Upload Photo | Q58461039 |
| Bury St Edmunds War Memorial | II | IP33 1UZ, Bury St. Edmunds | war memorial | | 16 January 2020 | TL8549864291; 52°14′44″N 0°42′57″E | | 1468360 | Bury St Edmunds War Memorial More images | Q97460930 |
| Numbers 1, 1a, 2 and 3 West Front and Sampsons Tower | I | 1, 2, And 3, Abbey Precincts, Bury St. Edmunds | tower | | 7 August 1952 | TL8564664094; 52°14′37″N 0°43′04″E | | 1375539 | Numbers 1, 1a, 2 and 3 West Front and Sampsons Tower More images | Q17526816 |
| Churchyard | II | 6, Abbey Precincts, Bury St. Edmunds | | | 12 July 1972 | TL8580064060; 52°14′36″N 0°43′12″E | | 1375561 | Upload Photo | Q26656335 |
| A8, Monument | II | Abbey Precincts, Bury St. Edmunds, Great Churchyard | | | 30 October 1997 | TL8571163995; 52°14′34″N 0°43′07″E | | 1272036 | Upload Photo | Q26561910 |
| A11, Monument | II | Abbey Precincts, Bury St. Edmunds, Great Churchyard | | | 30 October 1997 | TL8576864014; 52°14′35″N 0°43′10″E | | 1021931 | Upload Photo | Q26272796 |
| A4, Monument 1 | II | Abbey Precincts, Bury St. Edmunds, Great Churchyard | | | 30 October 1997 | TL8560064034; 52°14′35″N 0°43′01″E | | 1245093 | Upload Photo | Q26537660 |
| A5, Monument 3 | II | Abbey Precincts, Bury St. Edmunds, Great Churchyard | | | 30 October 1997 | TL8560364038; 52°14′36″N 0°43′02″E | | 1245100 | Upload Photo | Q26537667 |
| A9, Monuments 5 and 6 | II | Abbey Precincts, Bury St. Edmunds, Great Churchyard | | | 30 October 1997 | TL8568564053; 52°14′36″N 0°43′06″E | | 1272047 | Upload Photo | Q26561921 |
| A4, Monument 5a | II | Abbey Precincts, Bury St. Edmunds, Great Churchyard | | | 30 October 1997 | TL8560364030; 52°14′35″N 0°43′02″E | | 1245094 | Upload Photo | Q26537661 |
| A7, Monument 7 | II | Abbey Precincts, Bury St. Edmunds, Great Churchyard | | | 30 October 1997 | TL8567364047; 52°14′36″N 0°43′05″E | | 1364047 | Upload Photo | Q26645843 |
| A6, Monument 13 | II | Abbey Churchyard, Bury St. Edmunds, Great Churchyard | | | 30 October 1997 | TL8568763975; 52°14′33″N 0°43′06″E | | 1364046 | Upload Photo | Q26645842 |
| A5, Monuments 14, 15 and 30 | II | Abbey Precincts, Bury St. Edmunds, Great Churchyard | | | 30 October 1997 | TL8561064027; 52°14′35″N 0°43′02″E | | 1245101 | Upload Photo | Q26537668 |
| A8, Monument 15 | II | Abbey Precincts, Bury St. Edmunds, Great Churchyard | | | 30 October 1997 | TL8570863984; 52°14′34″N 0°43′07″E | | 1364049 | Upload Photo | Q26645845 |
| A10, Monument 15 | II | Abbey Precincts, Bury St. Edmunds, Great Churchyard | | | 30 October 1997 | TL8574763996; 52°14′34″N 0°43′09″E | | 1272074 | Upload Photo | Q26561947 |
| A11, Monument 19 | II | Abbey Precincts, Bury St. Edmunds, Great Churchyard | | | 30 October 1997 | TL8577063998; 52°14′34″N 0°43′10″E | | 1021927 | Upload Photo | Q26272792 |
| A7, Monument 20 | II | Abbey Precincts, Bury St. Edmunds, Great Churchyard | | | 30 October 1997 | TL8567764051; 52°14′36″N 0°43′05″E | | 1364048 | Upload Photo | Q26645844 |
| A4, Monument 25 | II | Abbey Precincts, Bury St. Edmunds, Great Churchyard | | | 30 October 1997 | TL8561164015; 52°14′35″N 0°43′02″E | | 1245095 | Upload Photo | Q26537662 |
| A9, Monument 25 | II | Abbey Precincts, Bury St. Edmunds, Great Churchyard | | | 30 October 1997 | TL8569264046; 52°14′36″N 0°43′06″E | | 1272048 | Upload Photo | Q26561922 |
| A3, Monuments 29, 43a, 44, 49, 50, 51 | II | Abbey Precincts, Bury St. Edmunds, Great Churchyard | | | 30 October 1997 | TL8562164013; 52°14′35″N 0°43′02″E | | 1245043 | Upload Photo | Q26537617 |
| A4, Monuments 31 and 34 | II | Abbey Precincts, Bury St. Edmunds, Great Churchyard | | | 30 October 1997 | TL8561264003; 52°14′34″N 0°43′02″E | | 1245096 | Upload Photo | Q26537663 |
| A11, Monuments 33 and 34 | II | Monuments 33 and 34, Abbey Precincts, Bury St. Edmunds, Great Churchyard | | | 30 October 1997 | TL8577164003; 52°14′34″N 0°43′10″E | | 1021929 | Upload Photo | Q26272794 |
| A3, Monument 35 | II | Abbey Precincts, Bury St. Edmunds, Great Churchyard | | | 30 October 1997 | TL8559964018; 52°14′35″N 0°43′01″E | | 1245044 | Upload Photo | Q26537618 |
| A8, Monuments 37 and 72 | II | Abbey Precincts, Bury St. Edmunds, Great Churchyard | | | 30 October 1997 | TL8570164001; 52°14′34″N 0°43′07″E | | 1272035 | Upload Photo | Q26561909 |
| A10, Monument 38 | II | Abbey Precincts, Bury St. Edmunds, Great Churchyard | | | 30 October 1997 | TL8575664004; 52°14′34″N 0°43′10″E | | 1272075 | Upload Photo | Q26561948 |
| A5, Monument 40 | II | Abbey Precincts, Bury St. Edmunds, Great Churchyard | | | 30 October 1997 | TL8561264036; 52°14′36″N 0°43′02″E | | 1245102 | Upload Photo | Q26537669 |
| A11, Monument 44 | II | Abbey Precincts, Bury St. Edmunds, Great Churchyard | | | 30 October 1997 | TL8577363999; 52°14′34″N 0°43′10″E | | 1021932 | Upload Photo | Q26272797 |
| A4, Monument 47 | II | Abbey Precincts, Bury St. Edmunds, Great Churchyard | | | 30 October 1997 | TL8561863989; 52°14′34″N 0°43′02″E | | 1245097 | Upload Photo | Q26537664 |
| A3, Monuments 48, 54, 60, 67, 73, 74, 80 and 86 | II | Abbey Precincts, Bury St. Edmunds, Great Churchyard | | | 30 October 1997 | TL8559264002; 52°14′34″N 0°43′01″E | | 1245045 | Upload Photo | Q26537619 |
| A8, Monument 55 | II | Abbey Precincts, Bury St. Edmunds, Great Churchyard | | | 30 October 1997 | TL8571663988; 52°14′34″N 0°43′07″E | | 1272037 | Upload Photo | Q26561911 |
| A3, Monuments 57, 58 and 63 | II | Abbey Precincts, Bury St. Edmunds, Great Churchyard | | | 30 October 1997 | TL8560264011; 52°14′35″N 0°43′01″E | | 1245046 | Upload Photo | Q26537620 |
| A4, Monuments 65 and 68 | II | Abbey Churchyard, Bury St. Edmunds, Great Churchyard | | | 30 October 1997 | TL8562163982; 52°14′34″N 0°43′02″E | | 1245098 | Upload Photo | Q26537665 |
| A5, Monuments 69, 70 and 71 | II | Abbey Precincts, Bury St. Edmunds, Great Churchyard | | | 30 October 1997 | TL8562663995; 52°14′34″N 0°43′03″E | | 1245103 | Upload Photo | Q26537670 |
| A10, Monument 72 | II | Abbey Precincts, Bury St. Edmunds, Great Churchyard | | | 30 October 1997 | TL8572464039; 52°14′35″N 0°43′08″E | | 1272076 | Upload Photo | Q26561949 |
| A9, Monument 78 | II | Abbey Precincts, Bury St. Edmunds, Great Churchyard | | | 30 October 1997 | TL8570464058; 52°14′36″N 0°43′07″E | | 1272049 | Upload Photo | Q26561923 |
| A4, Monument 82 | II | Abbey Precincts, Bury St. Edmunds, Great Churchyard | | | 30 October 1997 | TL8562863969; 52°14′33″N 0°43′03″E | | 1245099 | Upload Photo | Q26537666 |
| A8, Monuments 82 and 93 | II | Abbey Precincts, Bury St. Edmunds, Great Churchyard | | | 30 October 1997 | TL8570064005; 52°14′34″N 0°43′07″E | | 1272038 | Upload Photo | Q26561912 |
| A10, Monument 92 | II | Abbey Precincts, Bury St. Edmunds, Great Churchyard | | | 30 October 1997 | TL8573364045; 52°14′36″N 0°43′08″E | | 1272077 | Upload Photo | Q26561950 |
| A5, Monument 96 | II | Abbey Precincts, Bury St. Edmunds, Great Churchyard | | | 30 October 1997 | TL8562564000; 52°14′34″N 0°43′03″E | | 1245104 | Upload Photo | Q26537671 |
| A5, Monuments 101, 119, 126, 127 | II | Abbey Precincts, Bury St. Edmunds, Great Churchyard | | | 30 October 1997 | TL8562564009; 52°14′35″N 0°43′03″E | | 1245106 | Upload Photo | Q26537673 |
| A3, Monument 104 | II | Abbey Precincts, Bury St. Edmunds, Great Churchyard | | | 30 October 1997 | TL8560264004; 52°14′35″N 0°43′01″E | | 1245047 | Upload Photo | Q26537621 |
| A8, Monuments 104, 116 and 122 | II | Abbey Precincts, Bury St. Edmunds, Great Churchyard | | | 30 October 1997 | TL8568364004; 52°14′34″N 0°43′06″E | | 1272039 | Upload Photo | Q26561913 |
| A3, Monuments 107, 110, 111, 112, 118, 119, 125, 126, 143, 152 | II | Abbey Precincts, Bury St. Edmunds, Great Churchyard | | | 30 October 1997 | TL8559563984; 52°14′34″N 0°43′01″E | | 1245048 | Upload Photo | Q26537622 |
| A5, Monuments 121, 122, 123 | II | Abbey Precincts, Bury St. Edmunds, Great Churchyard | | | 30 October 1997 | TL8563264006; 52°14′35″N 0°43′03″E | | 1245107 | Upload Photo | Q26537674 |
| A8, Monuments 123 and 124 | II | Abbey Precincts, Bury St. Edmunds, Great Churchyard | | | 30 October 1997 | TL8568964007; 52°14′35″N 0°43′06″E | | 1272040 | Upload Photo | Q26561914 |
| A10, Monuments 125, 126, 139, 140, 178, 179 | II | Abbey Precincts, Bury St. Edmunds, Great Churchyard | | | 30 October 1997 | TL8574864042; 52°14′36″N 0°43′09″E | | 1272078 | Upload Photo | Q26561951 |
| A5, Monuments 131, 153, 154 | II | Abbey Precincts, Bury St. Edmunds, Great Churchyard | | | 30 October 1997 | TL8563064014; 52°14′35″N 0°43′03″E | | 1245108 | Upload Photo | Q26537675 |
| A3, Monument 134 | II | Abbey Precincts, Bury St. Edmunds, Great Churchyard | | | 30 October 1997 | TL8560863998; 52°14′34″N 0°43′02″E | | 1245049 | Upload Photo | Q26537623 |
| A8, Monument 141 | II | Abbey Precincts, Bury St. Edmunds, Great Churchyard | | | 30 October 1997 | TL8568164007; 52°14′35″N 0°43′06″E | | 1272041 | Upload Photo | Q26561915 |
| A9, Monuments 147 and 148 | II | Abbey Precincts, Bury St. Edmunds, Great Churchyard | | | 30 October 1997 | TL8572564054; 52°14′36″N 0°43′08″E | | 1272066 | Upload Photo | Q26561939 |
| A8, Monument 149 | II | Abbey Precincts, Bury St. Edmunds, Great Churchyard | | | 30 October 1997 | TL8567764010; 52°14′35″N 0°43′05″E | | 1272042 | Upload Photo | Q26561916 |
| A8, Monuments 153, 161a, 162 and 176 | II | Abbey Precincts, Bury St. Edmunds, Great Churchyard | | | 30 October 1997 | TL8568564013; 52°14′35″N 0°43′06″E | | 1272043 | Upload Photo | Q26561917 |
| A9, Monument 154 | II | Abbey Precincts, Bury St. Edmunds, Great Churchyard | | | 30 October 1997 | TL8572664061; 52°14′36″N 0°43′08″E | | 1272067 | Upload Photo | Q26561940 |
| A5, Monuments 159, 159a, 161, 292, 294, 295, 319, 320 | II | Abbey Precincts, Bury St. Edmunds, Great Churchyard | | | 30 October 1997 | TL8563664014; 52°14′35″N 0°43′03″E | | 1245109 | Upload Photo | Q26537676 |
| A5, Monument 164 | II | Abbey Precincts, Bury St. Edmunds, Great Churchyard | | | 30 October 1997 | TL8562963985; 52°14′34″N 0°43′03″E | | 1245111 | Upload Photo | Q26537678 |
| A10, Monuments 171, 191 | II | Abbey Precincts, Bury St. Edmunds, Great Churchyard | | | 30 October 1997 | TL8575564026; 52°14′35″N 0°43′10″E | | 1272079 | Upload Photo | Q26561952 |
| A11, Monument 172 | II | Abbey Precincts, Bury St. Edmunds, Great Churchyard | | | 30 October 1997 | TL8577264022; 52°14′35″N 0°43′10″E | | 1021933 | Upload Photo | Q26272798 |
| A9, Monuments 176, 177 and 178 | II | Abbey Precincts, Bury St. Edmunds, Great Churchyard | | | 30 October 1997 | TL8573264055; 52°14′36″N 0°43′08″E | | 1272068 | Upload Photo | Q26561941 |
| A8, Monuments 177 and 177a | II | Abbey Precincts, Bury St. Edmunds, Great Churchyard | | | 30 October 1997 | TL8568164015; 52°14′35″N 0°43′06″E | | 1272044 | Upload Photo | Q26561918 |
| A3, Monuments 178, 179 and 197 | II | Abbey Precincts, Bury St. Edmunds, Great Churchyard | | | 30 October 1997 | TL8559863984; 52°14′34″N 0°43′01″E | | 1245050 | Upload Photo | Q26537624 |
| A9, Monuments 182 and 189 | II | Abbey Precincts, Bury St. Edmunds, Great Churchyard | | | 30 October 1997 | TL8573264058; 52°14′36″N 0°43′08″E | | 1272069 | Upload Photo | Q26561942 |
| A10, Monument 185 | II | Abbey Precincts, Bury St. Edmunds, Great Churchyard | | | 30 October 1997 | TL8575464015; 52°14′35″N 0°43′09″E | | 1272080 | Upload Photo | Q26561953 |
| A5, Monuments 186 and 187 | II | Abbey Precincts, Bury St. Edmunds, Great Churchyard | | | 30 October 1997 | TL8563263987; 52°14′34″N 0°43′03″E | | 1364034 | Upload Photo | Q26645830 |
| A8, Monuments 186, 187, 189, 206 and 207 | II | Abbey Precincts, Bury St. Edmunds, Great Churchyard | | | 30 October 1997 | TL8571163993; 52°14′34″N 0°43′07″E | | 1272045 | Upload Photo | Q26561919 |
| A9, Monument 186 | II | Abbey Precincts, Bury St. Edmunds, Great Churchyard | | | 30 October 1997 | TL8573564054; 52°14′36″N 0°43′09″E | | 1272070 | Upload Photo | Q26561943 |
| A11, Monument 190 | II | Abbey Precincts, Bury St. Edmunds, Great Churchyard | | | 30 October 1997 | TL8577464023; 52°14′35″N 0°43′11″E | | 1021935 | Upload Photo | Q26272801 |
| A5, Monuments 194, 195, 196, 200, 201, 202, 203, 204, 205 | II | Abbey Precincts, Bury St. Edmunds, Great Churchyard | | | 30 October 1997 | TL8562863995; 52°14′34″N 0°43′03″E | | 1364035 | Upload Photo | Q26645831 |
| A11, Monument 199 | II | Abbey Precincts, Bury St. Edmunds, Great Churchyard | | | 30 October 1997 | TL8577464032; 52°14′35″N 0°43′11″E | | 1021936 | Upload Photo | Q26272802 |
| A9, Monument 200 | II | Abbey Precincts, Bury St. Edmunds, Great Churchyard | | | 30 October 1997 | TL8573764058; 52°14′36″N 0°43′09″E | | 1272071 | Upload Photo | Q26561944 |
| A11, Monument 201 | II | Abbey Precincts, Bury St. Edmunds, Great Churchyard | | | 30 October 1997 | TL8577564039; 52°14′35″N 0°43′11″E | | 1021937 | Upload Photo | Q26272803 |
| A3, Monuments 206 and 208 | II | Abbey Precincts, Bury St. Edmunds, Great Churchyard | | | 30 October 1997 | TL8560963983; 52°14′34″N 0°43′02″E | | 1245051 | Upload Photo | Q26537625 |
| A3, Monuments 207, 210, 211, 216, 217 | II | Abbey Precincts, Bury St. Edmunds, Great Churchyard | | | 30 October 1997 | TL8560263974; 52°14′34″N 0°43′01″E | | 1245091 | Upload Photo | Q26537658 |
| A9, Monument 207 | II | Abbey Precincts, Bury St. Edmunds, Great Churchyard | | | 30 October 1997 | TL8574364063; 52°14′36″N 0°43′09″E | | 1272072 | Upload Photo | Q26561945 |
| A5, Monuments 208, 209, 210, 211, 213, 214, 215 | II | Abbey Precincts, Bury St. Edmunds, Great Churchyard | | | 30 October 1997 | TL8563064001; 52°14′34″N 0°43′03″E | | 1364036 | Upload Photo | Q26645832 |
| A10, Monument 209 | II | Abbey Precincts, Bury St. Edmunds, Great Churchyard | | | 30 October 1997 | TL8575764043; 52°14′36″N 0°43′10″E | | 1021924 | Upload Photo | Q26272788 |
| A9, Monuments 211 and 215 | II | Abbey Precincts, Bury St. Edmunds, Great Churchyard | | | 30 October 1997 | TL8575164059; 52°14′36″N 0°43′09″E | | 1272073 | Upload Photo | Q26561946 |
| A8, Monuments 214, 215 and 218 | II | Abbey Precincts, Bury St. Edmunds, Great Churchyard | | | 30 October 1997 | TL8570563995; 52°14′34″N 0°43′07″E | | 1272046 | Upload Photo | Q26561920 |
| A3, Monument 219 | II | Abbey Precincts, Bury St. Edmunds, Great Churchyard | | | 30 October 1997 | TL8561163975; 52°14′34″N 0°43′02″E | | 1245092 | Upload Photo | Q26537659 |
| A5, Monument 219 | II | Abbey Precincts, Bury St. Edmunds, Great Churchyard | | | 30 October 1997 | TL8563963987; 52°14′34″N 0°43′03″E | | 1364037 | Upload Photo | Q26645833 |
| A10, Monuments 246 and 247 | II | Abbey Precincts, Bury St. Edmunds, Great Churchyard | | | 30 October 1997 | TL8575964030; 52°14′35″N 0°43′10″E | | 1021925 | Upload Photo | Q26272790 |
| A5, Monuments 275, 276 and 277 | II | Abbey Precincts, Bury St. Edmunds, Great Churchyard | | | 30 October 1997 | TL8565363987; 52°14′34″N 0°43′04″E | | 1364038 | Upload Photo | Q26645834 |
| A10, Monuments 281, 282, 303, 304 | II | Abbey Precincts, Bury St. Edmunds, Great Churchyard | | | 30 October 1997 | TL8576164050; 52°14′36″N 0°43′10″E | | 1021926 | Upload Photo | Q26272791 |
| A5, Monument 281 | II | Abbey Precincts, Bury St. Edmunds, Great Churchyard | | | 30 October 1997 | TL8564863993; 52°14′34″N 0°43′04″E | | 1364039 | Upload Photo | Q26645835 |
| A5, Monuments 282, 283, 284, 285 | II | Abbey Precincts, Bury St. Edmunds, Great Churchyard | | | 30 October 1997 | TL8564063996; 52°14′34″N 0°43′03″E | | 1364040 | Upload Photo | Q26645836 |
| A11, Monument 310 | II | Abbey Precincts, Bury St. Edmunds, Great Churchyard | | | 30 October 1997 | TL8579264043; 52°14′36″N 0°43′12″E | | 1021938 | Upload Photo | Q26272804 |
| A5, Monument 348 | II | Abbey Precincts, Bury St. Edmunds, Great Churchyard | | | 30 October 1997 | TL8566563995; 52°14′34″N 0°43′05″E | | 1364041 | Upload Photo | Q26645837 |
| A11, Monument 349 | II | Abbey Precincts, Bury St. Edmunds, Great Churchyard | | | 30 October 1997 | TL8580164025; 52°14′35″N 0°43′12″E | | 1021939 | Upload Photo | Q26272805 |
| A11, Monuments 379, 380, 381, 382, 383, 384, 385, 386, 387, 388, 389, 390, 391, 392, 393, 394, 395, 396, 397, 398, 399, 400, 301, 402, 403, 404, 405, 406, 407, 408, 409, 410, 411 | II | Abbey Precincts, Bury St. Edmunds, Great Churchyard | | | 30 October 1997 | TL8580264036; 52°14′35″N 0°43′12″E | | 1021940 | Upload Photo | Q26272806 |
| A5, Monument 392 | II | Abbey Precincts, Bury St. Edmunds, Great Churchyard | | | 30 October 1997 | TL8566863982; 52°14′34″N 0°43′05″E | | 1364042 | Upload Photo | Q26645838 |
| A5, Monument 397 | II | Abbey Precincts, Bury St. Edmunds, Great Churchyard | | | 30 October 1997 | TL8567063984; 52°14′34″N 0°43′05″E | | 1364043 | Upload Photo | Q26645839 |
| A5, Monument 449 | II | Abbey Precincts, Bury St. Edmunds, Great Churchyard | | | 30 October 1997 | TL8563963978; 52°14′34″N 0°43′03″E | | 1364044 | Upload Photo | Q26645840 |
| A5, Monument 453 | II | Abbey Precincts, Bury St. Edmunds, Great Churchyard | | | 30 October 1997 | TL8564363971; 52°14′33″N 0°43′04″E | | 1364045 | Upload Photo | Q26645841 |
| Abbey Gate and Gatehouse | I | Abbey Precincts, Bury St. Edmunds | gatehouse | | 7 August 1952 | TL8554464220; 52°14′42″N 0°42′59″E | | 1375545 | Abbey Gate and Gatehouse More images | Q17526846 |
| Abbots Bridge and Adjoining East Precinct Wall | I | Abbey Precincts, Bury St. Edmunds | bridge | | 7 August 1952 | TL8578864356; 52°14′46″N 0°43′12″E | | 1375552 | Abbots Bridge and Adjoining East Precinct Wall More images | Q17526887 |
| Alwyne House and Alwyne Cottage | I | Abbey Precincts, Bury St. Edmunds | cottage | | 7 August 1952 | TL8569264313; 52°14′44″N 0°43′07″E | | 1375554 | Alwyne House and Alwyne Cottage More images | Q17526900 |
| Drinking Fountain and Sundial | II | Abbey Precincts, Bury St. Edmunds | drinking fountain | | 30 October 1997 | TL8561864192; 52°14′41″N 0°43′03″E | | 1245038 | Drinking Fountain and Sundial More images | Q26537612 |
| Garden House | II | Abbey Precincts, Bury St. Edmunds | | | 30 October 1997 | TL8561564305; 52°14′44″N 0°43′03″E | | 1245040 | Upload Photo | Q26537614 |
| Garden Wall to Numbers 1 and 2 Churchyard (numbers 1 and 2 Churchyard Not Included) | II | Abbey Precincts, Bury St. Edmunds | | | 12 July 1972 | TL8575164069; 52°14′36″N 0°43′09″E | | 1375560 | Upload Photo | Q26656334 |
| Garden Walls and Railings to Provosts House and Number 4 Churchyard | II | Abbey Precincts, Bury St. Edmunds | | | 30 October 1997 | TL8570064094; 52°14′37″N 0°43′07″E | | 1375559 | Upload Photo | Q26656333 |
| Martyrs Memorial | II | Abbey Precincts, Bury St. Edmunds | memorial | | 30 October 1997 | TL8560364064; 52°14′36″N 0°43′02″E | | 1375565 | Martyrs Memorial More images | Q26656338 |
| Norman Tower | I | Abbey Precincts, Bury St. Edmunds | tower | | 7 August 1952 | TL8557264078; 52°14′37″N 0°43′00″E | | 1375555 | Norman Tower More images | Q17526902 |
| North Wall of Great Court of the Abbey | I | Abbey Precincts, Bury St. Edmunds | | | 7 August 1952 | TL8558364292; 52°14′44″N 0°43′01″E | | 1375553 | Upload Photo | Q17526893 |
| Outbuilding to Number 3 Outbuilding to Number 3 Crown Street | II | Abbey Precincts, Bury St. Edmunds | | | 12 July 1972 | TL8558664054; 52°14′36″N 0°43′01″E | | 1375563 | Upload Photo | Q26656336 |
| Precinct Wall of Former Vineyard Along North Side of Kevelaer Way | I | Abbey Precincts, Bury St. Edmunds | | | 7 August 1952 | TL8598664051; 52°14′36″N 0°43′22″E | | 1375550 | Upload Photo | Q17526877 |
| Precinct Wall on South to East of Shire Hall (shire Hall Not Included) | I | Abbey Precincts, Bury St. Edmunds | | | 7 August 1952 | TL8584363983; 52°14′34″N 0°43′14″E | | 1375549 | Upload Photo | Q17526868 |
| Precinct Wall to North of the Abbey Gate | I | Abbey Precincts, Bury St. Edmunds | | | 7 August 1952 | TL8553664246; 52°14′42″N 0°42′58″E | | 1375546 | Upload Photo | Q17526852 |
| Precinct Wall to South of the Abbey Gate | I | Abbey Precincts, Bury St. Edmunds | | | 7 August 1952 | TL8554564201; 52°14′41″N 0°42′59″E | | 1375547 | Upload Photo | Q17526856 |
| Provosts House and Number 4 Churchyard (clopton Cottage) | I | Abbey Precincts, Bury St. Edmunds | architectural structure | | 7 August 1952 | TL8569964076; 52°14′37″N 0°43′07″E | | 1375558 | Provosts House and Number 4 Churchyard (clopton Cottage) More images | Q17526912 |
| Ruins of Abbey Church of St Edmund | I | Abbey Precincts, Bury St. Edmunds | | | 7 August 1952 | TL8575364100; 52°14′37″N 0°43′10″E | | 1375540 | Upload Photo | Q17526820 |
| Ruins of Abbey Dovecote and Part of Wall | I | Abbey Precincts, Bury St. Edmunds | dovecote | | 12 July 1972 | TL8576964275; 52°14′43″N 0°43′11″E | | 1375544 | Ruins of Abbey Dovecote and Part of Wall More images | Q17526841 |
| Ruins of Chapel of the Charnel | I | Abbey Precincts, Bury St. Edmunds | chapel | | 7 August 1952 | TL8566364020; 52°14′35″N 0°43′05″E | | 1375556 | Ruins of Chapel of the Charnel More images | Q17526907 |
| Ruins of Hall of Pleas and South Wall of Great Court | I | Abbey Precincts, Bury St. Edmunds | | | 7 August 1952 | TL8559564177; 52°14′40″N 0°43′01″E | | 1375543 | Ruins of Hall of Pleas and South Wall of Great Court More images | Q17526834 |
| Ruins to East and North of Abbey Church | I | Abbey Precincts, Bury St. Edmunds | | | 7 August 1952 | TL8574764163; 52°14′39″N 0°43′09″E | | 1375541 | Upload Photo | Q17526824 |
| Ruins to the North of the Cloister | I | Abbey Precincts, Bury St. Edmunds | | | 7 August 1952 | TL8570664236; 52°14′42″N 0°43′07″E | | 1375542 | Ruins to the North of the Cloister More images | Q17526828 |
| St Margarets House | II* | Abbey Precincts, Bury St. Edmunds | house | | 7 August 1952 | TL8580163977; 52°14′33″N 0°43′12″E | | 1375562 | St Margarets House More images | Q17545764 |
| Table Tomb 3 Metres South of the Cathedral of St James | II | Abbey Precincts, Bury St. Edmunds | | | 30 October 1997 | TL8562164100; 52°14′38″N 0°43′03″E | | 1245041 | Upload Photo | Q26537615 |
| Table Tomb 30 Metres to the South of the Cathedral of St James | II | Abbey Precincts, Bury St. Edmunds | | | 30 October 1997 | TL8561664072; 52°14′37″N 0°43′02″E | | 1245042 | Upload Photo | Q26537616 |
| Tower Cottage | II | Abbey Precincts, Bury St. Edmunds | | | 12 July 1972 | TL8558464062; 52°14′36″N 0°43′01″E | | 1375564 | Tower Cottage More images | Q26656337 |
| Wall to East of Former Abbey Vineyard | I | Abbey Precincts, Bury St. Edmunds | | | 7 August 1952 | TL8599064244; 52°14′42″N 0°43′22″E | | 1375551 | Upload Photo | Q17526882 |
| 1, Angel Hill | II | 1, Angel Hill, Bury St. Edmunds | | | 7 August 1952 | TL8550664143; 52°14′39″N 0°42′57″E | | 1141151 | Upload Photo | Q26433910 |
| 2, Angel Hill | II | 2, Angel Hill, Bury St. Edmunds | | | 7 August 1952 | TL8550064157; 52°14′40″N 0°42′56″E | | 1141152 | 2, Angel Hill More images | Q26433911 |
| Anselm Court (numbers 1, 2, 3 and 4) | II | 1, 2, 3 and 4, Anselm Court, Angel Hill, Bury St. Edmunds | | | 12 July 1972 | TL8554664096; 52°14′38″N 0°42′59″E | | 1377005 | Anselm Court (numbers 1, 2, 3 and 4) More images | Q26657502 |
| Angel Hotel | II* | 3, Angel Hill, Bury St. Edmunds | hotel | | 7 August 1952 | TL8549064186; 52°14′41″N 0°42′56″E | | 1141153 | Angel Hotel More images | Q17545359 |
| 4, Angel Hill | II | 4, Angel Hill, Bury St. Edmunds | building | | 7 August 1952 | TL8549064208; 52°14′41″N 0°42′56″E | | 1141154 | 4, Angel Hill More images | Q26433912 |
| Scandinavia House | II | 5, Angel Hill, Bury St. Edmunds | | | 7 August 1952 | TL8549064234; 52°14′42″N 0°42′56″E | | 1141155 | Scandinavia House More images | Q26433914 |
| 6, Angel Hill | II* | 6, Angel Hill, Bury St. Edmunds | building | | 7 August 1952 | TL8549064241; 52°14′42″N 0°42′56″E | | 1141156 | 6, Angel Hill More images | Q17545363 |
| Angel Corner | II | 8, Angel Hill, Bury St. Edmunds | | | 12 July 1972 | TL8546064307; 52°14′44″N 0°42′55″E | | 1141157 | Angel Corner More images | Q26433915 |
| 10, Angel Hill | II | 10, Angel Hill, Bury St. Edmunds | | | 7 August 1952 | TL8549764318; 52°14′45″N 0°42′57″E | | 1141159 | 10, Angel Hill More images | Q26433917 |
| 11, Angel Hill | II | 11, Angel Hill, Bury St. Edmunds | | | 7 August 1952 | TL8550664323; 52°14′45″N 0°42′57″E | | 1141160 | 11, Angel Hill More images | Q26433919 |
| 12, Angel Hill | II | 12, Angel Hill, Bury St. Edmunds | | | 7 August 1952 | TL8551964326; 52°14′45″N 0°42′58″E | | 1141161 | 12, Angel Hill More images | Q26433921 |
| Numbers 13 and 14 and Attached Railings | II | 13 and 14, Angel Hill, Bury St. Edmunds | | | 7 August 1952 | TL8552864330; 52°14′45″N 0°42′58″E | | 1141162 | Numbers 13 and 14 and Attached Railings More images | Q26433922 |
| Number 15 and Attached Railings | II | 15, Angel Hill, Bury St. Edmunds | | | 7 August 1952 | TL8554764331; 52°14′45″N 0°42′59″E | | 1141163 | Number 15 and Attached Railings More images | Q26433923 |
| 16, Angel Hill | II | 16, Angel Hill, Bury St. Edmunds | | | 7 August 1952 | TL8555564336; 52°14′45″N 0°43′00″E | | 1141164 | 16, Angel Hill More images | Q26433924 |
| 17, Angel Hill | II | 17, Angel Hill, Bury St. Edmunds | | | 28 December 1961 | TL8556564337; 52°14′45″N 0°43′00″E | | 1141165 | Upload Photo | Q26433925 |
| 19, 19a and 21, Angel Hill | II | 19, 19a and 21, Angel Hill, Bury St. Edmunds | | | 12 July 1972 | TL8560264316; 52°14′45″N 0°43′02″E | | 1141168 | 19, 19a and 21, Angel Hill More images | Q26433930 |
| 22, 22a, 23 and 23a, Angel Hill | II | 22, 22a, 23 and 23a, Angel Hill, Bury St. Edmunds | | | 12 July 1972 | TL8558764309; 52°14′44″N 0°43′01″E | | 1141169 | 22, 22a, 23 and 23a, Angel Hill More images | Q26433931 |
| 24, Angel Hill | II | 24, Angel Hill, Bury St. Edmunds | | | 12 July 1972 | TL8558264308; 52°14′44″N 0°43′01″E | | 1141170 | 24, Angel Hill More images | Q26433932 |
| Richard Green and Partners | II | 24b, Angel Hill, Bury St. Edmunds | | | 12 July 1972 | TL8557364306; 52°14′44″N 0°43′01″E | | 1141171 | Richard Green and Partners More images | Q26433933 |
| The One Bull Public House | II | 25 and 25a, Angel Hill, Bury St. Edmunds | pub | | 12 July 1972 | TL8556264297; 52°14′44″N 0°43′00″E | | 1141173 | The One Bull Public House More images | Q26433936 |
| Crescent House (number 28) | II | 27 and 28, Angel Hill, Bury St. Edmunds | | | 28 December 1961 | TL8553064275; 52°14′43″N 0°42′58″E | | 1141176 | Crescent House (number 28) More images | Q26433939 |
| Sworders | II | 29, Angel Hill, Bury St. Edmunds | | | 28 December 1961 | TL8553164267; 52°14′43″N 0°42′58″E | | 1141177 | Sworders More images | Q26433940 |
| Abbey House | II* | 30, Angel Hill, Bury St. Edmunds | | | 7 August 1952 | TL8555064176; 52°14′40″N 0°42′59″E | | 1141178 | Abbey House More images | Q17545369 |
| 31, 32 and 33, Angel Hill | II* | 31, 32 and 33, Angel Hill, Bury St. Edmunds | | | 12 July 1972 | TL8555664141; 52°14′39″N 0°42′59″E | | 1141179 | 31, 32 and 33, Angel Hill More images | Q17545373 |
| 34, Angel Hill | II | 34, Angel Hill, Bury St. Edmunds | | | 12 July 1972 | TL8555864130; 52°14′39″N 0°42′59″E | | 1376998 | 34, Angel Hill More images | Q26657497 |
| Athenaeum and Attached Railings | I | Angel Hill, Bury St. Edmunds | building | | 7 August 1952 | TL8553064136; 52°14′39″N 0°42′58″E | | 1376999 | Athenaeum and Attached Railings More images | Q17526979 |
| Boundary Wall to North of Borough Offices (offices Not Included) | II | Angel Hill, Bury St. Edmunds | | | 30 October 1997 | TL8547564297; 52°14′44″N 0°42′55″E | | 1377000 | Upload Photo | Q26657498 |
| Cathedral Church of St James | I | Angel Hill, Bury St. Edmunds | Anglican or Episcopal cathedral | | 7 August 1952 | TL8559764117; 52°14′38″N 0°43′01″E | | 1377001 | Cathedral Church of St James More images | Q1989407 |
| K6 Telephone Kiosk | II | Angel Hill, Bury St. Edmunds | | | 26 October 1987 | TL8548864255; 52°14′43″N 0°42′56″E | | 1377002 | K6 Telephone Kiosk More images | Q26895039 |
| Stable Block to Number 8 | II | Angel Hill, Bury St. Edmunds | | | 12 July 1972 | TL8545964307; 52°14′44″N 0°42′55″E | | 1141158 | Upload Photo | Q26433916 |
| The Pillar of Salt Road Sign | II | Angel Hill, Bury St. Edmunds | signpost | | 17 September 1998 | TL8551264228; 52°14′42″N 0°42′57″E | | 1376516 | The Pillar of Salt Road Sign More images | Q7194139 |
| 1, Athenaeum Lane | II | 1, Athenaeum Lane, Bury St. Edmunds | | | 12 July 1972 | TL8551164117; 52°14′38″N 0°42′57″E | | 1377003 | 1, Athenaeum Lane More images | Q26657500 |
| 7, Athenaeum Lane | II | 7, Athenaeum Lane, Bury St. Edmunds | | | 30 October 1997 | TL8552464118; 52°14′38″N 0°42′58″E | | 1377004 | Upload Photo | Q26657501 |
| 2 and 3, Barn Lane | II | 2 and 3, Barn Lane, Bury St. Edmunds | | | 12 July 1972 | TL8598864589; 52°14′53″N 0°43′23″E | | 1377006 | Upload Photo | Q26657503 |
| Linnet House | II | 20, Barkers Lane, Bury St. Edmunds | | | 7 August 1952 | TL8592963607; 52°14′21″N 0°43′18″E | | 1272112 | Upload Photo | Q26561984 |
| The Obelisk | II | Chequer Square, Bury St. Edmunds | | | 7 August 1952 | TL8555264051; 52°14′36″N 0°42′59″E | | 1248048 | The Obelisk More images | Q26540292 |
| 1 and 2, Chequer Square | II | 1 and 2, Chequer Square, Bury St. Edmunds | | | 7 August 1952 | TL8555164026; 52°14′35″N 0°42′59″E | | 1248045 | 1 and 2, Chequer Square More images | Q26540290 |
| Baret House | II* | 3, Chequer Square, Bury St. Edmunds | house | | 7 August 1952 | TL8553664032; 52°14′35″N 0°42′58″E | | 1248046 | Baret House More images | Q17545578 |
| Chequer House | II | 4, Chequer Square, Bury St. Edmunds | | | 7 August 1952 | TL8553064048; 52°14′36″N 0°42′58″E | | 1248047 | Upload Photo | Q26540291 |
| Masonic Hall | II | 37, Churchgate Street, Bury St. Edmunds | Masonic temple | | 7 August 1952 | TL8554264087; 52°14′37″N 0°42′58″E | | 1248209 | Masonic Hall More images | Q26540440 |
| Tower House | II | 1 and 2, Crown Street, Bury St. Edmunds | | | 12 July 1972 | TL8557164063; 52°14′36″N 0°43′00″E | | 1076932 | Upload Photo | Q26342863 |
| 3 and 4, Crown Street | II | 3 and 4, Crown Street, Bury St. Edmunds | | | 12 July 1972 | TL8557264050; 52°14′36″N 0°43′00″E | | 1076933 | 3 and 4, Crown Street More images | Q26342865 |
| 5 and 6, Crown Street | II | 5 and 6, Crown Street, Bury St. Edmunds | | | 12 July 1972 | TL8557664037; 52°14′36″N 0°43′00″E | | 1076934 | 5 and 6, Crown Street More images | Q26342869 |
| 7 and 8, Crown Street | II | 7 and 8, Crown Street, Bury St. Edmunds | | | 12 July 1972 | TL8557964023; 52°14′35″N 0°43′00″E | | 1076936 | 7 and 8, Crown Street More images | Q26342871 |
| Number 9 and Attached Mounting Block | II | 9, Crown Street, Bury St. Edmunds | | | 7 August 1952 | TL8561463911; 52°14′31″N 0°43′02″E | | 1076939 | Number 9 and Attached Mounting Block More images | Q26342883 |
| 10, Crown Street | II | 10, Crown Street, Bury St. Edmunds | | | 7 August 1952 | TL8561463899; 52°14′31″N 0°43′02″E | | 1076941 | Upload Photo | Q26342888 |
| 14, Crown Street | II | 14, Crown Street, Bury St. Edmunds | | | 7 August 1952 | TL8561663879; 52°14′30″N 0°43′02″E | | 1076942 | Upload Photo | Q26342890 |
| 15, Crown Street | II | 15, Crown Street, Bury St. Edmunds | | | 7 August 1952 | TL8561563870; 52°14′30″N 0°43′02″E | | 1342748 | Upload Photo | Q26626691 |
| 24-27, Crown Street | II | 24-27, Crown Street, Bury St. Edmunds | | | 12 July 1972 | TL8561763798; 52°14′28″N 0°43′02″E | | 1342749 | 24-27, Crown Street More images | Q26626692 |
| Dog and Partridge Inn | II* | 29, Crown Street, Bury St. Edmunds | inn | | 7 August 1952 | TL8559363861; 52°14′30″N 0°43′01″E | | 1342750 | Dog and Partridge Inn More images | Q17545693 |
| Number 30 and Attached Stable | II | 30, Crown Street, Bury St. Edmunds | | | 7 August 1952 | TL8559063874; 52°14′30″N 0°43′01″E | | 1342751 | Number 30 and Attached Stable More images | Q26626693 |
| 31, Crown Street | II | 31, Crown Street, Bury St. Edmunds | | | 7 August 1952 | TL8558763886; 52°14′31″N 0°43′00″E | | 1342752 | 31, Crown Street More images | Q26626694 |
| 32 and 33, Crown Street | II | 32 and 33, Crown Street, Bury St. Edmunds | | | 12 July 1972 | TL8558463891; 52°14′31″N 0°43′00″E | | 1342753 | 32 and 33, Crown Street More images | Q26626695 |
| 34 and 35, Crown Street | II | 34 and 35, Crown Street, Bury St. Edmunds | | | 12 July 1972 | TL8558263899; 52°14′31″N 0°43′00″E | | 1342754 | 34 and 35, Crown Street More images | Q26626696 |
| 36a, 36b, 37 and 38, Crown Street | II | 36a, 36b, 37 and 38, Crown Street, Bury St. Edmunds | | | 12 July 1972 | TL8557363914; 52°14′32″N 0°43′00″E | | 1342755 | 36a, 36b, 37 and 38, Crown Street More images | Q26626697 |
| 39, Crown Street | II | 39, Crown Street, Bury St. Edmunds | | | 12 July 1972 | TL8557363928; 52°14′32″N 0°43′00″E | | 1342756 | 39, Crown Street More images | Q26626698 |
| 40, Crown Street | II | 40, Crown Street, Bury St. Edmunds | | | 7 August 1952 | TL8557263936; 52°14′32″N 0°43′00″E | | 1342757 | 40, Crown Street More images | Q26626699 |
| 41, 42 and 43, Crown Street | II | 41, 42 and 43, Crown Street, Bury St. Edmunds | | | 12 July 1972 | TL8556663954; 52°14′33″N 0°42′59″E | | 1342758 | 41, 42 and 43, Crown Street More images | Q26626700 |
| 44, Crown Street | II | 44, Crown Street, Bury St. Edmunds | | | 7 August 1952 | TL8555963971; 52°14′33″N 0°42′59″E | | 1342759 | 44, Crown Street More images | Q26626701 |
| 45 and 45a, Crown Street | II* | 45 and 45a, Crown Street, Bury St. Edmunds | | | 7 August 1952 | TL8556163986; 52°14′34″N 0°42′59″E | | 1342760 | 45 and 45a, Crown Street More images | Q17545699 |
| 46 and 47, Crown Street | II | 46 and 47, Crown Street, Bury St. Edmunds | | | 12 July 1972 | TL8556263991; 52°14′34″N 0°42′59″E | | 1342761 | Upload Photo | Q26626702 |
| 48, Crown Street | II | 48, Crown Street, Bury St. Edmunds | | | 12 July 1952 | TL8556263999; 52°14′34″N 0°42′59″E | | 1342762 | 48, Crown Street More images | Q26626703 |
| 49, Crown Street | II | 49, Crown Street, Bury St. Edmunds | | | 7 August 1952 | TL8556164008; 52°14′35″N 0°42′59″E | | 1342763 | 49, Crown Street More images | Q26626704 |
| 50, Crown Street | II | 50, Crown Street, Bury St. Edmunds | | | 7 August 1952 | TL8556064027; 52°14′35″N 0°42′59″E | | 1342764 | 50, Crown Street More images | Q26626705 |
| Church of St Mary and Attached Wall and Railings | I | Crown Street, Bury St. Edmunds | parish church | | 7 August 1952 | TL8560463945; 52°14′33″N 0°43′01″E | | 1342765 | Church of St Mary and Attached Wall and Railings More images | Q7590158 |
| The Fox Inn | II* | 1, Eastgate Street, Bury St. Edmunds | inn | | 7 August 1952 | TL8578264402; 52°14′47″N 0°43′12″E | | 1075223 | The Fox Inn More images | Q17545321 |
| The Broadway | II | 4, Eastgate Street, Bury St. Edmunds | | | 12 July 1972 | TL8579864420; 52°14′48″N 0°43′13″E | | 1075224 | Upload Photo | Q26338153 |
| The Broadway | II | 5, Eastgate Street, Bury St. Edmunds | | | 12 July 1972 | TL8580364424; 52°14′48″N 0°43′13″E | | 1075225 | Upload Photo | Q26338155 |
| The Broadway | II | 6, Eastgate Street, Bury St. Edmunds | | | 12 July 1972 | TL8580764429; 52°14′48″N 0°43′13″E | | 1075226 | Upload Photo | Q26338158 |
| The Broadway | II | 7, Eastgate Street, Bury St. Edmunds | | | 12 July 1972 | TL8581064433; 52°14′48″N 0°43′13″E | | 1075227 | Upload Photo | Q26338161 |
| The Broadway | II | 8 and 9, Eastgate Street, Bury St. Edmunds | | | 12 July 1972 | TL8581864434; 52°14′48″N 0°43′14″E | | 1075228 | Upload Photo | Q26338164 |
| The Broadway | II | 10 and 11, Eastgate Street, Bury St. Edmunds | | | 12 July 1972 | TL8582864440; 52°14′48″N 0°43′14″E | | 1075229 | Upload Photo | Q26338166 |
| 12, Eastgate Street | II | 12, Eastgate Street, Bury St. Edmunds | | | 12 July 1972 | TL8586264452; 52°14′49″N 0°43′16″E | | 1075230 | Upload Photo | Q26338169 |
| 13 and 14, Eastgate Street | II | 13 and 14, Eastgate Street, Bury St. Edmunds | | | 1 August 1969 | TL8587564463; 52°14′49″N 0°43′17″E | | 1075231 | Upload Photo | Q26338171 |
| 15, Eastgate Street | II | 15, Eastgate Street, Bury St. Edmunds | | | 1 August 1969 | TL8588164468; 52°14′49″N 0°43′17″E | | 1075232 | Upload Photo | Q26338174 |
| 18, Eastgate Street | II | 18, Eastgate Street, Bury St. Edmunds | | | 7 August 1952 | TL8589164480; 52°14′50″N 0°43′18″E | | 1075233 | Upload Photo | Q26338176 |
| 19 and 20, Eastgate Street | II | 19 and 20, Eastgate Street, Bury St. Edmunds | | | 7 August 1952 | TL8589964488; 52°14′50″N 0°43′18″E | | 1343591 | Upload Photo | Q26627377 |
| 21 and 22, Eastgate Street | II | 21 and 22, Eastgate Street, Bury St. Edmunds | | | 7 August 1952 | TL8590564492; 52°14′50″N 0°43′18″E | | 1343592 | Upload Photo | Q26627378 |
| 25, Eastgate Street | II | 25, Eastgate Street, Bury St. Edmunds | | | 12 July 1972 | TL8593664524; 52°14′51″N 0°43′20″E | | 1343593 | Upload Photo | Q26627379 |
| 33, Eastgate Street | II | 33, Eastgate Street, Bury St. Edmunds | | | 7 August 1952 | TL8598064563; 52°14′52″N 0°43′22″E | | 1343594 | Upload Photo | Q26627380 |
| 37, 38 and 39, Eastgate Street | II | 37, 38 and 39, Eastgate Street, Bury St. Edmunds | | | 30 October 1997 | TL8607964628; 52°14′54″N 0°43′28″E | | 1343596 | Upload Photo | Q26627381 |
| 43, Eastgate Street | II | 43, Eastgate Street, Bury St. Edmunds | | | 30 October 1997 | TL8610964639; 52°14′54″N 0°43′29″E | | 1343597 | Upload Photo | Q26627382 |
| Unicorn House | II | 57, Eastgate Street, Bury St. Edmunds | | | 12 July 1972 | TL8618064667; 52°14′55″N 0°43′33″E | | 1343598 | Upload Photo | Q26627383 |
| The Glen | II | 84, Eastgate Street, Bury St. Edmunds | | | 12 July 1972 | TL8631164672; 52°14′55″N 0°43′40″E | | 1343599 | Upload Photo | Q26627384 |
| 85 and 86, Eastgate Street | II | 85 and 86, Eastgate Street, Bury St. Edmunds | | | 12 July 1972 | TL8614764625; 52°14′54″N 0°43′31″E | | 1343600 | Upload Photo | Q26627385 |
| 93, 94 and 95, Eastgate Street | II | 93, 94 and 95, Eastgate Street, Bury St. Edmunds | | | 12 July 1972 | TL8611964614; 52°14′54″N 0°43′30″E | | 1343601 | Upload Photo | Q26627386 |
| Eastgate House | II | 118, Eastgate Street, Bury St. Edmunds | | | 7 August 1952 | TL8595964504; 52°14′50″N 0°43′21″E | | 1343602 | Upload Photo | Q26627387 |
| Eastgate Cottage | II | 141, Eastgate Street, Bury St. Edmunds | | | 30 October 1997 | TL8583864362; 52°14′46″N 0°43′15″E | | 1343603 | Upload Photo | Q26627388 |
| Ancient House Oak House | II* | 33a, Eastgate Street, Bury St. Edmunds | | | 7 August 1952 | TL8598664569; 52°14′52″N 0°43′23″E | | 1343595 | Upload Photo | Q17545704 |
| Bridge Over the River Lark | II | Eastgate Street, Bury St. Edmunds | | | 12 July 1972 | TL8584464421; 52°14′48″N 0°43′15″E | | 1343604 | Upload Photo | Q26627389 |
| Drinking Trough the Broadway | II | Eastgate Street, Bury St. Edmunds | | | 30 October 1997 | TL8581164405; 52°14′47″N 0°43′13″E | | 1343605 | Upload Photo | Q26627390 |
| The Old School to Rear of Number 140 the Lodge (number 140 the Lodge Is Not Included) | II | Eastgate Street, Bury St. Edmunds | | | 30 October 1997 | TL8588764411; 52°14′47″N 0°43′17″E | | 1363683 | Upload Photo | Q26645504 |
| St Nicholas | II* | 2, Hollow Road, Bury St. Edmunds | architectural structure | | 7 August 1952 | TL8636564820; 52°15′00″N 0°43′43″E | | 1022540 | St Nicholas More images | Q17540303 |
| Boundary Walls to St Nicholas and Chapel Cottage (chapel Cottage Not Included) | II | Hollow Road, Bury St. Edmunds | | | 12 July 1972 | TL8635864788; 52°14′59″N 0°43′43″E | | 1022541 | Upload Photo | Q26272468 |
| 1 and 2, Honey Hill | II | 1 and 2, Honey Hill, Bury St. Edmunds | | | 7 August 1952 | TL8566963947; 52°14′33″N 0°43′05″E | | 1022544 | 1 and 2, Honey Hill More images | Q26272472 |
| 3, Honey Hill | II | 3, Honey Hill, Bury St. Edmunds | | | 12 July 1972 | TL8568763953; 52°14′33″N 0°43′06″E | | 1022545 | 3, Honey Hill More images | Q26272473 |
| 4, Honey Hill | II | 4, Honey Hill, Bury St. Edmunds | | | 12 July 1972 | TL8575663939; 52°14′32″N 0°43′09″E | | 1022546 | 4, Honey Hill More images | Q26273472 |
| 5, Honey Hill | II | 5, Honey Hill, Bury St. Edmunds | | | 12 July 1972 | TL8574563936; 52°14′32″N 0°43′09″E | | 1022547 | 5, Honey Hill More images | Q26273473 |
| St Denys | II* | 6, Honey Hill, Bury St. Edmunds | | | 7 August 1952 | TL8570063928; 52°14′32″N 0°43′06″E | | 1022548 | Upload Photo | Q17540320 |
| 6a, Honey Hill | II | 6a, Honey Hill, Bury St. Edmunds | | | 12 July 1972 | TL8569163921; 52°14′32″N 0°43′06″E | | 1022549 | 6a, Honey Hill More images | Q26273474 |
| Number 10 and Attached Outbuilding | II | 10, Honey Hill, Bury St. Edmunds | | | 2 September 1985 | TL8565363922; 52°14′32″N 0°43′04″E | | 1022550 | Number 10 and Attached Outbuilding More images | Q26273476 |
| Manor House | I | Honey Hill, Bury St. Edmunds | building | | 7 August 1952 | TL8573763933; 52°14′32″N 0°43′08″E | | 1022551 | Manor House More images | Q17526473 |
| Boundary Wall to St Edmund Hospital and Nursing Home | II | Maynewater Lane, Bury St. Edmunds | | | 30 October 1997 | TL8576363611; 52°14′22″N 0°43′09″E | | 1022593 | Upload Photo | Q26273522 |
| Lodge to Moreton Hall School | II | Mount Road, Bury St. Edmunds | | | 12 July 1972 | TL8708564618; 52°14′53″N 0°44′21″E | | 1022598 | Upload Photo | Q26273524 |
| Moreton Hall School | II* | Mount Road, Bury St. Edmunds | school building | | 12 July 1972 | TL8693564497; 52°14′49″N 0°44′13″E | | 1022597 | Moreton Hall School More images | Q15256210 |
| Mustow Corner House Mustow House the Garden House | II | 1a, Mustow Street, Bury St. Edmunds | house | | 7 August 1952 | TL8563064358; 52°14′46″N 0°43′04″E | | 1022599 | Mustow Corner House Mustow House the Garden House More images | Q26273525 |
| 17, Mustow Street | II | 17, Mustow Street, Bury St. Edmunds | | | 7 August 1952 | TL8577164389; 52°14′47″N 0°43′11″E | | 1022600 | Upload Photo | Q26273526 |
| Lark House | II | 21 and 22, Mustow Street, Bury St. Edmunds | | | 12 July 1972 | TL8567564348; 52°14′46″N 0°43′06″E | | 1022601 | Upload Photo | Q26273527 |
| 26, 28 and 29, Mustow Street | II | 26, 28 and 29, Mustow Street, Bury St. Edmunds | | | 12 July 1972 | TL8564864339; 52°14′45″N 0°43′05″E | | 1022602 | 26, 28 and 29, Mustow Street More images | Q26273528 |
| Precinct Wall to North of the Former Abbey of St Edmund | I | Mustow Street, Bury St. Edmunds | | | 7 August 1952 | TL8573464361; 52°14′46″N 0°43′09″E | | 1375548 | Upload Photo | Q17526864 |
| The Dutch House | II | Mustow Street, Bury St. Edmunds | | | 7 August 1952 | TL8564664363; 52°14′46″N 0°43′04″E | | 1022609 | Upload Photo | Q26273536 |
| 18, Angel Hill | II | 1, 2 and 3, Northgate Street, Bury St. Edmunds | | | 7 August 1952 | TL8557564343; 52°14′46″N 0°43′01″E | | 1141167 | 18, Angel Hill More images | Q26433927 |
| 7, Northgate Street | II* | 7, Northgate Street, Bury St. Edmunds | | | 7 August 1952 | TL8556864410; 52°14′48″N 0°43′00″E | | 1022611 | 7, Northgate Street More images | Q17540360 |
| Northgate House | I | 8, Northgate Street, Bury St. Edmunds | building | | 7 August 1952 | TL8555864450; 52°14′49″N 0°43′00″E | | 1022615 | Northgate House More images | Q17526477 |
| The Mews House and Attached Walls | II | 8a, Northgate Street, Bury St. Edmunds | | | 12 July 1972 | TL8554564422; 52°14′48″N 0°42′59″E | | 1022620 | Upload Photo | Q26273546 |
| 9, 10 and 11, Northgate Street | I | 9, 10 and 11, Northgate Street, Bury St. Edmunds | | | 7 August 1952 | TL8555464472; 52°14′50″N 0°43′00″E | | 1022624 | Upload Photo | Q17526487 |
| Nos. 12 and 12a, Northgate Street | II | 12 and 12a, Northgate Street, Bury St. Edmunds | | | 7 August 1952 | TL8554764510; 52°14′51″N 0°43′00″E | | 1022630 | Nos. 12 and 12a, Northgate Street More images | Q26273555 |
| Durley House | II | 17, Northgate Street, Bury St. Edmunds | | | 7 August 1952 | TL8552164577; 52°14′53″N 0°42′58″E | | 1022631 | Upload Photo | Q26273556 |
| St Michaels Close Flats 1-11 (consecutive) | II* | 18, Northgate Street, Bury St. Edmunds | | | 7 August 1952 | TL8549264657; 52°14′56″N 0°42′57″E | | 1022633 | Upload Photo | Q17540388 |
| 25, 26 and 27, Northgate Street | II | 25, 26 and 27, Northgate Street, Bury St. Edmunds | | | 12 March 1996 | TL8549264741; 52°14′58″N 0°42′57″E | | 1022638 | Upload Photo | Q26273562 |
| 28, Northgate Street | II | 28, Northgate Street, Bury St. Edmunds | | | 12 July 1972 | TL8548664786; 52°15′00″N 0°42′57″E | | 1022641 | Upload Photo | Q26273564 |
| Number 41 and Attached Wall | II | 41, Northgate Street, Bury St. Edmunds | | | 12 July 1972 | TL8547564890; 52°15′03″N 0°42′57″E | | 1022642 | Upload Photo | Q26273565 |
| The New Inn and Attached Wall | II | 42, Northgate, Bury St. Edmunds | | | 30 October 1997 | TL8547164917; 52°15′04″N 0°42′56″E | | 1365759 | Upload Photo | Q26647416 |
| 79, Northgate Street | II | 79, Northgate Street, Bury St. Edmunds | | | 12 July 1972 | TL8548764962; 52°15′06″N 0°42′57″E | | 1365764 | Upload Photo | Q26647421 |
| Goldsmiths House | II | 89, Northgate Street, Bury St. Edmunds | | | 7 August 1952 | TL8549664906; 52°15′04″N 0°42′58″E | | 1365765 | Upload Photo | Q26647422 |
| 96 and 96a, Northgate Street | II | 96 and 96a, Northgate Street, Bury St. Edmunds | | | 13 March 1987 | TL8551064812; 52°15′01″N 0°42′58″E | | 1365769 | Upload Photo | Q26647426 |
| 110, Northgate Street | II | 110, Northgate Street, Bury St. Edmunds | | | 7 August 1952 | TL8554964609; 52°14′54″N 0°43′00″E | | 1365771 | Upload Photo | Q26647428 |
| Manson House | II* | 111, Northgate Street, Bury St. Edmunds | house | | 7 August 1952 | TL8556464543; 52°14′52″N 0°43′01″E | | 1365772 | Manson House More images | Q17545727 |
| 112, Northgate Street | II* | 112, Northgate Street, Bury St. Edmunds | | | 7 August 1952 | TL8557164516; 52°14′51″N 0°43′01″E | | 1365773 | 112, Northgate Street More images | Q17545733 |
| Manchester House | II* | 113, Northgate Street, Bury St. Edmunds | house | | 7 August 1952 | TL8557664492; 52°14′50″N 0°43′01″E | | 1365774 | Manchester House More images | Q17545743 |
| 114, Northgate Street | II | 114, Northgate Street, Bury St. Edmunds | | | 7 August 1952 | TL8558464467; 52°14′50″N 0°43′01″E | | 1365775 | 114, Northgate Street More images | Q26647429 |
| 115 and 116, Northgate Street | II | 115 and 116, Northgate Street, Bury St. Edmunds | | | 7 August 1952 | TL8558664458; 52°14′49″N 0°43′02″E | | 1365776 | 115 and 116, Northgate Street More images | Q26647430 |
| 117, Northgate Street | II | 117, Northgate Street, Bury St. Edmunds | | | 7 August 1952 | TL8559164444; 52°14′49″N 0°43′02″E | | 1365777 | 117, Northgate Street More images | Q26647431 |
| Karrelbrook House | II | 118, 118b and 118c, Northgate Street, Bury St. Edmunds | | | 30 October 1997 | TL8559964430; 52°14′48″N 0°43′02″E | | 1375537 | Karrelbrook House More images | Q26656330 |
| 119, Northgate Street | II | 119, Northgate Street, Bury St. Edmunds | | | 12 July 1972 | TL8559564393; 52°14′47″N 0°43′02″E | | 1365778 | 119, Northgate Street More images | Q26647432 |
| 124 and 125, Northgate Street | II | 124 and 125, Northgate Street, Bury St. Edmunds | | | 12 July 1972 | TL8559764366; 52°14′46″N 0°43′02″E | | 1365779 | 124 and 125, Northgate Street More images | Q26647433 |
| 126 and 127, Northgate Street | II | 126 and 127, Northgate Street, Bury St. Edmunds | | | 12 July 1972 | TL8560264352; 52°14′46″N 0°43′02″E | | 1270964 | 126 and 127, Northgate Street More images | Q26560963 |
| The Cottage | II | Nowton Road, Bury St. Edmunds | | | 26 July 2004 | TL8625262948; 52°14′00″N 0°43′34″E | | 1391057 | Upload Photo | Q26688385 |
| Suffolk Record Office, Including Entrance Platform and Steps | II | 77 Raingate Street, IP33 2AR, Bury St. Edmunds | archives | | 23 June 2015 | TL8576763908; 52°14′31″N 0°43′10″E | | 1425808 | Suffolk Record Office, Including Entrance Platform and Steps More images | Q26677238 |
| 79, Raingate Street | II | 79, Raingate Street, Bury St. Edmunds | | | 12 July 1972 | TL8576363935; 52°14′32″N 0°43′10″E | | 1244888 | 79, Raingate Street More images | Q26537468 |
| Southgate House | II | 1, Sicklesmere Road, Bury St. Edmunds | | | 7 August 1952 | TL8625563198; 52°14′08″N 0°43′34″E | | 1135175 | Upload Photo | Q26428564 |
| South End House and Attached Wall | II | 2, Sicklesmere Road, Bury St. Edmunds | | | 12 July 1972 | TL8624363149; 52°14′06″N 0°43′34″E | | 1135177 | Upload Photo | Q26428566 |
| Gateway and Walling to Number 13 the Fort Fronting the Road | II* | 13, Sicklesmere Road, Bury St. Edmunds | | | 7 August 1952 | TL8633663062; 52°14′03″N 0°43′38″E | | 1135179 | Upload Photo | Q17545340 |
| The Fort | II | 13, Sicklesmere Road, Bury St. Edmunds | | | 12 July 1972 | TL8637463088; 52°14′04″N 0°43′40″E | | 1135178 | Upload Photo | Q26428567 |
| Gate Piers to Number 1 Southgate House | II | Sicklesmere Road, Bury St. Edmunds | | | 30 October 1997 | TL8623463206; 52°14′08″N 0°43′33″E | | 1135176 | Upload Photo | Q26428565 |
| 1, Southgate Green | II | 1, Southgate Green, Bury St. Edmunds | | | 12 July 1972 | TL8615263316; 52°14′12″N 0°43′29″E | | 1272182 | Upload Photo | Q26562052 |
| 2, Southgate Green | II | 2, Southgate Green, Bury St. Edmunds | | | 12 July 1972 | TL8616763324; 52°14′12″N 0°43′30″E | | 1272183 | Upload Photo | Q26562053 |
| 5 and 6, Southgate Green | II | 5 and 6, Southgate Green, Bury St. Edmunds | | | 12 July 1972 | TL8614063281; 52°14′10″N 0°43′28″E | | 1272184 | Upload Photo | Q26562054 |
| 2, Southgate Street | II | 2, Southgate Street, Bury St. Edmunds | | | 12 July 1972 | TL8582263776; 52°14′27″N 0°43′13″E | | 1272197 | 2, Southgate Street More images | Q26562067 |
| 3, Southgate Street | II | 3, Southgate Street, Bury St. Edmunds | | | 12 July 1972 | TL8582663772; 52°14′27″N 0°43′13″E | | 1272198 | 3, Southgate Street More images | Q26562068 |
| 4 and 5, Southgate Street | II | 4 and 5, Southgate Street, Bury St. Edmunds | | | 12 July 1972 | TL8583963750; 52°14′26″N 0°43′13″E | | 1272199 | 4 and 5, Southgate Street More images | Q26562069 |
| 7, Southgate Street | II | 7, Southgate Street, Bury St. Edmunds | | | 12 July 1972 | TL8584863738; 52°14′26″N 0°43′14″E | | 1272200 | 7, Southgate Street More images | Q26562070 |
| Newells | II | 8, Southgate Street, Bury St. Edmunds | | | 12 July 1972 | TL8585463729; 52°14′25″N 0°43′14″E | | 1272204 | Newells More images | Q26562074 |
| 9, Southgate Street | II | 9, Southgate Street, Bury St. Edmunds | | | 12 July 1972 | TL8585663723; 52°14′25″N 0°43′14″E | | 1272207 | 9, Southgate Street More images | Q26562076 |
| 12, Southgate Street | II | 12, Southgate Street, Bury St. Edmunds | | | 12 July 1972 | TL8586363712; 52°14′25″N 0°43′15″E | | 1272211 | 12, Southgate Street More images | Q26562079 |
| 13, Southgate Street | II | 13, Southgate Street, Bury St. Edmunds | | | 12 July 1972 | TL8586663706; 52°14′25″N 0°43′15″E | | 1272099 | 13, Southgate Street More images | Q26561971 |
| 19 and 20, Southgate Street | II | 19 and 20, Southgate Street, Bury St. Edmunds | | | 12 July 1972 | TL8587963682; 52°14′24″N 0°43′15″E | | 1272103 | 19 and 20, Southgate Street More images | Q26561975 |
| 24, Southgate Street | II | 24, Southgate Street, Bury St. Edmunds | | | 12 July 1972 | TL8588963663; 52°14′23″N 0°43′16″E | | 1272109 | 24, Southgate Street More images | Q26561981 |
| 34, Southgate Street | II | 34, Southgate Street, Bury St. Edmunds | | | 12 July 1972 | TL8594763577; 52°14′20″N 0°43′19″E | | 1272116 | Upload Photo | Q26561988 |
| 35, 36 and 37, Southgate Street | II | 35, 36 and 37, Southgate Street, Bury St. Edmunds | | | 30 October 1997 | TL8597163533; 52°14′19″N 0°43′20″E | | 1272120 | 35, 36 and 37, Southgate Street More images | Q26561992 |
| The Olde White Hart Hotel | II | 35, Southgate Street, Bury St. Edmunds | | | 12 July 1972 | TL8596263548; 52°14′19″N 0°43′20″E | | 1272119 | The Olde White Hart Hotel More images | Q26561991 |
| 38 and 38a, Southgate Street | II | 38 and 38a, Southgate Street, Bury St. Edmunds | | | 12 July 1972 | TL8598463521; 52°14′18″N 0°43′21″E | | 1272122 | 38 and 38a, Southgate Street More images | Q26561994 |
| South Hill and South Hill House | II | 42 and 43, Southgate Street, Bury St. Edmunds | | | 7 August 1952 | TL8603463453; 52°14′16″N 0°43′23″E | | 1272128 | South Hill and South Hill House More images | Q26562000 |
| 64, Southgate Street | II | 64, Southgate Street, Bury St. Edmunds | | | 30 October 1997 | TL8611763348; 52°14′13″N 0°43′27″E | | 1272131 | Upload Photo | Q26562003 |
| 71, Southgate Street | II | 71, Southgate Street, Bury St. Edmunds | | | 12 July 1972 | TL8613963323; 52°14′12″N 0°43′28″E | | 1272138 | Upload Photo | Q26562010 |
| Weavers Rest | II* | 80, Southgate Street, Bury St. Edmunds | architectural structure | | 7 August 1952 | TL8609463342; 52°14′13″N 0°43′26″E | | 1272141 | Weavers Rest More images | Q17545610 |
| 81 and 81a, Southgate Street | II | 81 and 81a, Southgate Street, Bury St. Edmunds | | | 7 August 1952 | TL8608863349; 52°14′13″N 0°43′26″E | | 1272143 | Upload Photo | Q26562013 |
| 83, Southgate Street | II | 83, Southgate Street, Bury St. Edmunds | | | 12 July 1972 | TL8605663387; 52°14′14″N 0°43′24″E | | 1272146 | Upload Photo | Q26562016 |
| Number 84 and Attached Railings | II | 84, Southgate Street, Bury St. Edmunds | | | 7 August 1952 | TL8604863395; 52°14′14″N 0°43′24″E | | 1272149 | Upload Photo | Q26562019 |
| 121 and 122, Southgate Street | II | 121 and 122, Southgate Street, Bury St. Edmunds | | | 12 July 1972 | TL8593463542; 52°14′19″N 0°43′18″E | | 1272157 | 121 and 122, Southgate Street More images | Q26562027 |
| 130 and 131, Southgate Street | II | 130 and 131, Southgate Street, Bury St. Edmunds | | | 7 August 1952 | TL8587663641; 52°14′22″N 0°43′15″E | | 1272159 | 130 and 131, Southgate Street More images | Q26562029 |
| 135, 136 and 137, Southgate Street | II | 135, 136 and 137, Southgate Street, Bury St. Edmunds | | | 12 July 1972 | TL8584463705; 52°14′25″N 0°43′14″E | | 1272160 | 135, 136 and 137, Southgate Street More images | Q26562030 |
| Number 138 and Attached Railings | II | 138, Southgate Street, Bury St. Edmunds | | | 12 July 1972 | TL8584163714; 52°14′25″N 0°43′13″E | | 1272168 | Number 138 and Attached Railings More images | Q26562038 |
| 146, Southgate Street | II | 146, Southgate Street, Bury St. Edmunds | | | 30 October 1997 | TL8582463740; 52°14′26″N 0°43′13″E | | 1272172 | 146, Southgate Street More images | Q26562042 |
| Gramercy Cottage | II | 148 and 149, Southgate Street, Bury St. Edmunds | | | 31 May 1985 | TL8581563753; 52°14′26″N 0°43′12″E | | 1272175 | Gramercy Cottage More images | Q26562045 |
| 153, Southgate Street | II | 153, Southgate Street, Bury St. Edmunds | | | 31 May 1985 | TL8580263773; 52°14′27″N 0°43′12″E | | 1272180 | 153, Southgate Street More images | Q26562050 |
| 154, Southgate Street | II | 154, Southgate Street, Bury St. Edmunds | | | 31 May 1985 | TL8580263779; 52°14′27″N 0°43′12″E | | 1084193 | 154, Southgate Street More images | Q26367784 |
| Garden Wall to Number 84 | II | Southgate Street, Bury St. Edmunds | | | 12 July 1972 | TL8601563392; 52°14′14″N 0°43′22″E | | 1272155 | Upload Photo | Q26562025 |
| 1, Sparhawk Street | II | 1, Sparhawk Street, Bury St. Edmunds | | | 12 July 1972 | TL8569963898; 52°14′31″N 0°43′06″E | | 1084195 | 1, Sparhawk Street More images | Q26367787 |
| Number 2 and Attached Wall | II | 2, Sparhawk Street, Bury St. Edmunds | | | 12 July 1972 | TL8570263889; 52°14′31″N 0°43′06″E | | 1084203 | Upload Photo | Q26367800 |
| The Cottage | II | 3, Sparhawk Street, Bury St. Edmunds | | | 12 July 1972 | TL8570463882; 52°14′30″N 0°43′07″E | | 1318848 | Upload Photo | Q26604962 |
| Number 5 and Attached Walls | II | 5, Sparhawk Street, Bury St. Edmunds | | | 7 August 1952 | TL8569363856; 52°14′30″N 0°43′06″E | | 1318850 | Number 5 and Attached Walls More images | Q26604964 |
| 6, Sparhawk Street | II | 6, Sparhawk Street, Bury St. Edmunds | | | 12 July 1972 | TL8568763875; 52°14′30″N 0°43′06″E | | 1318855 | 6, Sparhawk Street More images | Q26604969 |
| Number 7 and Attached Railings | II | 7, Sparhawk Street, Bury St. Edmunds | | | 12 July 1972 | TL8568363880; 52°14′30″N 0°43′05″E | | 1318859 | Number 7 and Attached Railings More images | Q26604973 |
| The Chantry Hotel | II | 8, Sparhawk Street, Bury St. Edmunds | | | 12 July 1972 | TL8568263886; 52°14′31″N 0°43′05″E | | 1318862 | The Chantry Hotel More images | Q26604976 |
| The Tudor Annexe | II | 9, Sparhawk Street, Bury St. Edmunds | | | 12 July 1972 | TL8567963903; 52°14′31″N 0°43′05″E | | 1318865 | The Tudor Annexe More images | Q26604979 |
| 10, Sparhawk Street | II | 10, Sparhawk Street, Bury St. Edmunds | | | 12 July 1972 | TL8567463913; 52°14′31″N 0°43′05″E | | 1145962 | 10, Sparhawk Street More images | Q26439127 |
| 2, St Marys Square | II | 2, St Marys Square, Bury St. Edmunds | | | 7 August 1952 | TL8574263824; 52°14′29″N 0°43′08″E | | 1135155 | 2, St Marys Square More images | Q26428545 |
| 3, St Marys Square | II | 3, St Marys Square, Bury St. Edmunds | | | 7 August 1952 | TL8574863829; 52°14′29″N 0°43′09″E | | 1135159 | 3, St Marys Square More images | Q26428549 |
| 4, St Marys Square | II | 4, St Marys Square, Bury St. Edmunds | | | 7 August 1952 | TL8575663836; 52°14′29″N 0°43′09″E | | 1135163 | 4, St Marys Square More images | Q26428553 |
| Detached Outbuilding in Garden of Number 4 | II | 4, St Marys Square, Bury St. Edmunds | | | 30 October 1997 | TL8575363851; 52°14′29″N 0°43′09″E | | 1135166 | Upload Photo | Q26428556 |
| 4a, St Marys Square | II | 4a, St Marys Square, Bury St. Edmunds | | | 12 July 1972 | TL8576263847; 52°14′29″N 0°43′10″E | | 1135168 | 4a, St Marys Square | Q26428559 |
| 5 and 6, St Marys Square | II* | 5 and 6, St Marys Square, Bury St. Edmunds | | | 7 August 1952 | TL8579163824; 52°14′28″N 0°43′11″E | | 1135169 | Upload Photo | Q17545331 |
| The Vicarage | II | 7, St Marys Square, Bury St. Edmunds | | | 7 August 1952 | TL8581163805; 52°14′28″N 0°43′12″E | | 1135171 | The Vicarage More images | Q26428561 |
| Number 8 and Attached Wall | II* | 8, St Marys Square, Bury St. Edmunds | | | 7 August 1952 | TL8579263786; 52°14′27″N 0°43′11″E | | 1135172 | Upload Photo | Q17545335 |
| Ornamental Centrepiece to Square | II | St Marys Square, Bury St. Edmunds | | | 30 October 1997 | TL8576663816; 52°14′28″N 0°43′10″E | | 1135173 | Upload Photo | Q26428562 |
| St Edmund Hospital and Nursing Home | II | St Marys Square, Bury St. Edmunds | | | 7 August 1952 | TL8576763738; 52°14′26″N 0°43′10″E | | 1135174 | Upload Photo | Q26428563 |
| Boundary Wall to Number 5 Boundary Wall to Number 5 St Marys Square | II | Swan Lane, Bury St. Edmunds | | | 12 July 1972 | TL8579263850; 52°14′29″N 0°43′11″E | | 1135170 | Upload Photo | Q26428560 |
| 1-6, The Vinefields | II | 1-6, The Vinefields, Bury St. Edmunds | | | 12 July 1972 | TL8595464479; 52°14′49″N 0°43′21″E | | 1038278 | Upload Photo | Q26289995 |
| 9-12, The Vinefields | II | 9-12, The Vinefields, Bury St. Edmunds | | | 12 July 1972 | TL8597464472; 52°14′49″N 0°43′22″E | | 1038279 | Upload Photo | Q26289996 |
| 1, Westgate Street | II | 1, Westgate Street, Bury St. Edmunds | | | 1 October 1985 | TL8565463751; 52°14′26″N 0°43′04″E | | 1141925 | 1, Westgate Street More images | Q26434718 |
| 2, 4 and 5, Westgate Street | II | 2, 4 and 5, Westgate Street, Bury St. Edmunds | | | 12 July 1972 | TL8564063750; 52°14′26″N 0°43′03″E | | 1141931 | 2, 4 and 5, Westgate Street More images | Q26434725 |
| 6, Westgate Street | II | 6, Westgate Street, Bury St. Edmunds | | | 7 August 1952 | TL8559863749; 52°14′26″N 0°43′01″E | | 1141935 | 6, Westgate Street More images | Q26434730 |
| Theatre Royal | I | Westgate Street, Bury St. Edmunds | theatre building | | 7 August 1952 | TL8561863739; 52°14′26″N 0°43′02″E | | 1142285 | Theatre Royal More images | Q7777423 |
| Green King Brewery Buildings on South East Corner of Crown Street Greene King Premises on South East Corner | II | Westgate Street, Bury St. Edmunds | | | 12 July 1972 | TL8561463786; 52°14′27″N 0°43′02″E | | 1342766 | Green King Brewery Buildings on South East Corner of Crown Street Greene King Premises on South East Corner More images | Q26626706 |
| Green King Brewery Buildings on South West Corner of Crown Street Greene King Premises on South West Corner | II | Westgate Street, Bury St. Edmunds | | | 12 July 1972 | TL8558863778; 52°14′27″N 0°43′00″E | | 1075221 | Green King Brewery Buildings on South West Corner of Crown Street Greene King Premises on South West Corner More images | Q26338148 |
| Greene King Main Brewhouse Brewery Yard | II | Westgate Street, Bury St. Edmunds | | | 30 October 1997 | TL8563463786; 52°14′27″N 0°43′03″E | | 1142282 | Upload Photo | Q26435089 |
| Green King Brewery Building on South West Corner of St Marys Square | II | Westgate Street, Bury St. Edmunds | | | 30 October 1997 | TL8573163781; 52°14′27″N 0°43′08″E | | 1142281 | Green King Brewery Building on South West Corner of St Marys Square More images | Q26435088 |

== See also ==
- Grade I listed buildings in Suffolk
- Grade II* listed buildings in Suffolk

== Sources ==
- Bettely, James; Pevsner, Nikolaus (2015) [1961], Suffolk: West, The Buildings of England, New Haven and London: Yale University Press, ISBN 978-0-300-19655-9
