= List of contributors to the Dictionary of National Biography =

Some 700 writers were contributors to the Dictionary of National Biography, in its first edition. Individual contributions vary from one biography, for example William Perkins, to 281 by Leslie Stephen, who was also editor of many volumes. They are listed below, in order of the name or initials they contributed under. Where they contributed under more than one signature, those are all given.

== A–C ==
- Alfred Ainger (Signing as A. A. in the DNB)
- Arthur Aikin Brodribb (Signing as A. A. B. in the DNB)
- Alexander Buchan (meteorologist) (Signing as A. B. in the DNB)
- Augustine Birrell (Signing as A. B-l. in the DNB)
- Alexander Balloch Grosart (Signing as A. B. G. in the DNB)
- Andrew Clark (Signing as A. C.-k. in the DNB)
- Augustus Charles Bickley (Signing as A. C. B. in the DNB)
- Alexander Charles Ewald (Signing as A. C. E. in the DNB)
- Alfred Cort Haddon (Signing as A. C. H. in the DNB)
- Alexander Charles O'Sullivan (Signing as A. C. O'S. in the DNB)
- Henry Austin Dobson (Signing as A. D. in the DNB)
- Alfred Egmont Hake (Signing as A. E. H. in the DNB)
- Aeneas James George Mackay (Signing as Æ. M. in the DNB)
- Arthur Edward Reade (Signing as A. E. R. in the DNB)
- Albert Frederick Pollard (Signing as A. F. P. in the DNB)
- Alfred Farthing Robbins (Signing as A. F. R. in the DNB)
- Alexander Gordon (Unitarian) (Signing as A. G. in the DNB)
- Archibald Geikie (Signing as A. G.-e. in the DNB)
- Alfred Goodwin (Signing as A. G-n. in the DNB)
- Anne Gilchrist (Signing as A. G-t. in the DNB)
- Andrew George Little (Signing as A. G. L. in the DNB)
- Arthur Hall (Signing as A. H. in the DNB)
- Albert Hartshorne (Signing as A. H. in the DNB)
- Albert Hartshorne (Signing as A. H.-e. in the DNB)
- Augustus Hughes-Hughes (Signing as A. H.-H. in the DNB)
- Arthur Harden (Signing as A. H.-n. in the DNB)
- Arthur Henry Bullen (Signing as A. H. B. in the DNB)
- Augustus Henry Beesly (Signing as A. H. B-y in the DNB)
- Arthur Herbert Church (Signing as A. H. C. in the DNB)
- Arthur Henry Grant (Signing as A. H. G. in the DNB)
- Alfred Henry Huth (Signing as A. H. H. in the DNB)
- Alexander Hastie Millar (Signing as A. H. M. in the DNB)
- Alexander Ireland (journalist) (Signing as A. I. in the DNB)
- Arthur Irwin Dasent (Signing as A. I. D. in the DNB)
- Augustus Jessopp (Signing as A. J. in the DNB)
- Alexander John Arbuthnot (Signing as A. J. A. in the DNB)
- Arthur John Butler (Signing as A. J. B. in the DNB)
- Augustus John Cuthbert Hare (Signing as A. J. C. H. in the DNB)
- Alfred John French (Signing as A. J. F. in the DNB)
- Alfred John Jukes-Browne (Signing as A. J. J.-B. in the DNB)
- Arthur James Mason (Signing as A. J. M. in the DNB)
- Alexander James Mitchell Morison (Signing as A. J. M. M. in the DNB)
- Andrew Lang (Signing as A. L. in the DNB)
- Arthur Locker (Signing as A. L. in the DNB)
- Alfred Lloyd Hardy (Signing as A. L. H. in the DNB)
- Alexander Mackie (Signing as A. M. in the DNB)
- Arthur Miller (Signing as A. M. in the DNB)
- Arthur Mee (Signing as A. M.-e. in the DNB)
- Agnes Macdonell (Signing as A. M.-l. in the DNB)
- Alice MacDonell (Signing as A. M-l in the DNB)
- Alfred Milner (Signing as A. M.-r. in the DNB)
- Agnes Mary Clerke (Signing as A. M. C. in the DNB)
- Alice Margaret Cooke (Signing as A. M. C.-e. in the DNB)
- Alice Mary Humphry (Signing as A. M. H. in the DNB)
- Albert Nicholson (Signing as A. N. in the DNB)
- Alfred Newton (Signing as A. N-n. in the DNB)
- Arthur Naylor Wollaston (Signing as A. N. W. in the DNB)
- Anne Isabella Ritchie (Signing as A. R. in the DNB)
- Augustus Robert Buckland (Signing as A. R. B. in the DNB)
- Andrew Russell Forsyth (Signing as A. R. F. in the DNB)
- Arthur Robert Morrison Finlayson (Signing as A. R. M. F. in the DNB)
- Alexander Reid Urquhart (Signing as A. R. U. in the DNB)
- Alfred Stowe (Signing as A. S. in the DNB)
- Arthur Sidgwick (Signing as A. S. in the DNB)
- Augustus Samuel Bolton (Signing as A. S. B. in the DNB)
- Algernon Sidney Bicknell (Signing as A. S. B-l in the DNB)
- Arthur Thomas Myers (Signing as A. T. M. in the DNB)
- Alfred Trice Martin (Signing as A. T. M.-n. in the DNB)
- Alsager Richard Vian (Signing as A. V. in the DNB)
- Arthur Waugh (Signing as A. W. in the DNB)
- Arthur William Moore (Signing as A. W. M. in the DNB)
- Alexander Wood Renton (Signing as A. W. R. in the DNB)
- Adolphus William Ward (Signing as A. W. W. in the DNB)
- Bernard Barham Woodward (Signing as B. B. W. in the DNB)
- Britiffe Constable Skottowe (Signing as B. C. S. in the DNB)
- Benjamin Daydon Jackson (Signing as B. D. J. in the DNB)
- Beaver Henry Blacker (Signing as B. H. B. in the DNB)
- Basil Harrington Soulsby (Signing as B. H. S. in the DNB)
- Bernard Mallet (Signing as B. M. in the DNB)
- Beatrix Marion Sturt (Signing as B. M. S. in the DNB)
- Bertha Porter (Signing as B. P. in the DNB)
- Benjamin Williamson (Signing as B. W. in the DNB)
- Charles Alexander Harris (Signing as C. A. H. in the DNB)
- Cornelia Augusta Hewett Crosse (Signing as C. A. H. C. in the DNB)
- Cecil Bendall (Signing as C. B. in the DNB)
- Charles Creighton (Signing as C. C. in the DNB)
- Clement Charles Julian Webb (Signing as C. C. J. W. in the DNB)
- Charlotte Carmichael Stopes (Signing as C. C. S. in the DNB)
- Campbell Dodgson (Signing as C. D. in the DNB)
- Charles Dalton (Signing as C. D.-n. in the DNB)
- Clinton Edward Dawkins (Signing as C. E. D. in the DNB)
- Caroline Emilia Stephen (Signing as C. E. S. in the DNB)
- Charles Edwyn Vaughan (Signing as C. E. V. in the DNB)
- Charles Francis Keary (Signing as C. F. K. in the DNB)
- Charles Ferrers Raymond Palmer (Signing as C. F. R. P. in the DNB)
- Charlotte Fell Smith (Signing as C. F. S. in the DNB)
- Claude Joseph Goldsmid Montefiore (Signing as C. G. M. in the DNB)
- Charles Henry Coote (Signing as C. H. C. in the DNB)
- Charles Henry Derby (Signing as C. H. D. in the DNB)
- Charles Harold Evelyn White (Signing as C. H. E. W. in the DNB)
- Charles Harding Firth (Signing as C. H. F. in the DNB)
- Charles Harold Herford (Signing as C. H. H. in the DNB)
- Charles Herbert Mayo (Signing as C. H. M. in the DNB)
- Charles Hercules Read (Signing as C. H. R. in the DNB)
- Cecil Harcourt Smith (Signing as C. H. S. in the DNB)
- Charles John Guthrie (Signing as C. J. G. in the DNB)
- Charles John Robinson (Signing as C. J. R. in the DNB)
- Charles Kent (Signing as C. K. in the DNB)
- Cæsar Litton Falkiner (Signing as C. L. F. in the DNB)
- Charles Lethbridge Kingsford (Signing as C. L. K. in the DNB)
- Conwy Lloyd Morgan (Signing as C. Ll. M. in the DNB)
- William Cosmo Monkhouse (Signing as C. M. in the DNB)
- Conolly Norman (Signing as C. N. in the DNB)
- Charles Platts (Signing as C. P. in the DNB)
- Charles Woodbyne Parish (Signing as C. P.-h. in the DNB)
- Raymond Beazley (Signing as C. R. B. in the DNB)
- Catherine Rachel Jones (Signing as C. R. J. in the DNB)
- Clements Robert Markham (Signing as C. R. M. in the DNB)
- Charles Edward Sayle (Signing as C. S. in the DNB)
- Coutts Trotter (Signing as C. T. in the DNB)
- Charles Trice Martin (Signing as C. T. M. in the DNB)
- Cornelius Walford (Signing as C. W. in the DNB)
- Charles Welsh (Signing as C. W. in the DNB)
- Charles Welch (Signing as C. W-h. in the DNB)
- Charles Wentworth Dilke (Signing as C. W. D. in the DNB)
- Charles William Sutton (Signing as C. W. S. in the DNB)

== D ==
- D'Arcy Power (Signing as D’A. P. in the DNB)
- David Alan Stevenson (Signing as D. A. S. in the DNB)
- David Berry Hart (Signing as D. B. H. in the DNB)
- Edward Dutton Cook (Signing as D. C. in the DNB)
- David Hannay (Signing as D. H. in the DNB)
- Daniel Hipwell (Signing as D. H-l. in the DNB)
- Daniel Hack Tuke (Signing as D. H. T. in the DNB)
- Dalrymple James Belgrave (Signing as D. J. B. in the DNB)
- David James O'Donoghue (Signing as D. J. O'D. in the DNB)
- Daniel Lleufer Thomas (Signing as D. Ll. T. in the DNB)
- Daniel Lleufer Thomas (Signing as D. L. T. in the DNB)
- Dudley Oliphant Murray (Signing as D. O. M. in the DNB)
- David Samuel Margoliouth (Signing as D. S. M. in the DNB)
- Douglas William Freshfield (Signing as D. W. F. in the DNB)

== E ==
- Evelyn Abbott (Signing as E. A. in the DNB)
- Edward Augustus Freeman (Signing as E. A. F. in the DNB)
- Ernest Alfred Wallis Budge (Signing as E. A. W. B. in the DNB)
- Edwin Bailey Elliott (Signing as E. B. E. in the DNB)
- Evelyn Blantyre Simpson (Signing as E. B. S. in the DNB)
- Edward Burnett Tylor (Signing as E. B. T. in the DNB)
- Edward Caird (Signing as E.C. in the DNB)
- Ernest Clarke (Signing as E.C. in the DNB)
- Edith Coleridge (Signing as E.C. in the DNB)
- Edward Caird (Signing as E. C.-d. in the DNB)
- Ernest Clarke (Signing as E. C.-E. in the DNB)
- Ernest Clarke (Signing as E. C.-e. in the DNB)
- Edwin Cannan (Signing as E. C.-N. in the DNB)
- Edwin Cannan (Signing as E. C-n. in the DNB)
- Ernest Charles Armytage Axon (Signing as E. C. A. A. in the DNB)
- Edward Carter Kersey Gonner (Signing as E. C. K. G. in the DNB)
- Edgar Cardew Marchant (Signing as E. C. M. in the DNB)
- Emma Catharine Sutton (Signing as E. C. S. in the DNB)
- Edward Dowden (Signing as E. D. in the DNB)
- Edmond George Fitzmaurice (Signing as E. F. in the DNB)
- Edward Fry (Signing as E. F.-y. in the DNB)
- Edward Francis Russell (Signing as E. F. R. in the DNB)
- Edward Francis Willoughby (Signing as E. F. W. in the DNB)
- Edmund Gosse (Signing as E. G. in the DNB)
- Everard Green (Signing as E. G. in the DNB)
- Ernest Gambier-Parry (Signing as E. G.-P. in the DNB)
- Edward Gordon Duff (Signing as E. G. D. in the DNB)
- Edward George Hawke (Signing as E. G. H. in the DNB)
- Eleanor Grace Powell (Signing as E. G. P. in the DNB)
- Edward Heron-Allen (Signing as E. H.-A. in the DNB)
- Edward Henry Marshall (Signing as E. H. M. in the DNB)
- Elizabeth Ingall (Signing as E. I. in the DNB)
- Edward Ingress Bell (Signing as E. I. B. in the DNB)
- Edward Irving Carlyle (Signing as E. I. C. in the DNB)
- Edward John Long Scott (Signing as E. J. L. S. in the DNB)
- Edward James Rapson (Signing as E. J. R. in the DNB)
- Elizabeth Lee (Signing as E. L. in the DNB)
- Edward Lee-Warner (Signing as E. L.-W. in the DNB)
- Edmond Leveson Calverley (Signing as E. L. C. in the DNB)
- Emma Louisa Radford (Signing as E. L. R. in the DNB)
- Ethelred Luke Taunton (Signing as E. L. T. in the DNB)
- Edward Milligen Beloe (Signing as E. M. B. in the DNB)
- Ellen Mary Clerke (Signing as E. M. C. in the DNB)
- Ernest Marsh Lloyd (Signing as E. M. L. in the DNB)
- Edward Maunde Thompson (Signing as E. M. T. in the DNB)
- Elizabeth Marion Todd (Signing as E.M.T-d. in the DNB)
- Edward O'Callaghan (Signing as E. O'C. in the DNB)
- Ernest Percival Rhys (Signing as E. P. R. in the DNB)
- Ernest Radford (Signing as E. R. in the DNB)
- Edward Smith (Signing as E. S. in the DNB)
- Edward Stanley Robertson (Signing as E. S. R. in the DNB)
- Evelyn Shirley Shuckburgh (Signing as E. S. S. in the DNB)
- Emily Tennyson Bradley (Signing as E. T. B. in the DNB)
- Edward Tyas Cook (Signing as E. T. C. in the DNB)
- Edmund Tanner Lawrence (Signing as E. T. L. in the DNB)
- Edmund Toulmin Nicolle (Signing as E. T. N. in the DNB)
- Emily Tennyson Bradley (Signing as E. T. S. in the DNB)
- Edmund Tolson Wedmore (Signing as E. T. W. in the DNB)
- Edmund Venables (Signing as E. V. in the DNB)
- Edward Verrall Lucas (Signing as E. V. L. in the DNB)
- Edward Walford (Signing as E. W. in the DNB)
- Ellen Williams (Signing as E. W-s. in the DNB)
- Edmund Gosse (Signing as E. W. G. in the DNB)

== F ==
- Frederick Joseph Bramwell (Signing as F. B.-l. in the DNB)
- Frederick Brooksbank Garnett (Signing as F. B. G. in the DNB)
- Francis Charles Hingeston-Randolph (Signing as F. C. H.-R. in the DNB)
- Francis Cranmer Penrose (Signing as F. C. P. in the DNB)
- Francis Darwin (Signing as F. D. in the DNB)
- Francis Espinasse (Signing as F. E. in the DNB)
- Frank Evers Beddard (Signing as F. E. B. in the DNB)
- Frederick George Edwards (Signing as F. G. E. in the DNB)
- Frederic George Stephens (Signing as F. G. S. in the DNB)
- Francis Hindes Groome (Signing as F. H. G. in the DNB)
- Fenton John Anthony Hort (Signing as F. J. A. H. in the DNB)
- Frederick James Furnivall (Signing as F. J. F. in the DNB)
- Frederic John Goldsmid (Signing as F. J. G. in the DNB)
- Francis Charles Lawley (Signing as F. L. in the DNB)
- Francis Legge (Signing as F. L. in the DNB)
- Falconer Madan (Signing as F. M. in the DNB)
- Freeman Marius O'Donoghue (Signing as F. M. O'D. in the DNB)
- Frederic Norgate (Signing as F. N. in the DNB)
- Francis Nevile Reid (Signing as F. N. R. in the DNB)
- William Fraser Rae (Signing as F. R. in the DNB)
- Francis Sanders (Signing as F. S. in the DNB)
- Francis Storr (Signing as F. S-r. in the DNB)
- Francis St. John Thackeray (Signing as F. S. J. T. in the DNB)
- Frederick Sydney Parry (Signing as F. S. P. in the DNB)
- Francis St. John Thackeray (Signing as F. St. J. T. in the DNB)
- Frank Thomas Marzials (Signing as F. T. M. in the DNB)
- Frederick Vallance James (Signing as F. V. J. in the DNB)
- Frederick Wedmore (Signing as F. W. in the DNB)
- Foster Watson (Signing as F. W.-n. in the DNB)
- Frank Watt (journalist) (Signing as F. W.-T. in the DNB)
- Francis Watt (journalist) (Signing as F. W-t. in the DNB)
- Frederick William Gamble (Signing as F. W. G. in the DNB)
- Frederic William Maitland (Signing as F. W. M. in the DNB)
- Frederic William Whyte (Signing as F. W. W. in the DNB)
- Francis Ysidro Edgeworth (Signing as F. Y. E. in the DNB)
- Frederick York Powell (Signing as F. Y. P. in the DNB)

== G ==
- Grant Allen (Signing as G. A. in the DNB)
- George Aitchison (Signing as G. A-n. in the DNB)
- George Atherton Aitken (Signing as G. A. A. in the DNB)
- Grenville Arthur James Cole (Signing as G. A. J. C. in the DNB)
- Ghetal Burdon-Sanderson (Signing as G. B.-S. in the DNB)
- George Binney Dibblee (Signing as G. B. D. in the DNB)
- George Birkbeck Norman Hill (Signing as G. B. H. in the DNB)
- Thomas George Bond Howes (Signing as G. B. H. in the DNB)
- George Barnett Smith (Signing as G. B. S. in the DNB)
- George Clinch (Signing as G. C. in the DNB)
- George Clement Boase (Signing as G. C. B. in the DNB)
- George Croom Robertson (Signing as G. C. R. in the DNB)
- George Edward Cokayne (Signing as G. E. C. in the DNB)
- Godfrey Edward Pellew Arkwright (Signing as G. E. P. A. in the DNB)
- George Farewell Jones (Signing as G. F. J. in the DNB)
- George Farrer Rodwell (Signing as G. F. R. in the DNB)
- George Fisher Russell Barker (Signing as G. F. R. B. in the DNB)
- George Frederic Warner (Signing as G. F. W. in the DNB)
- George Frederick Woodhouse Munby (Signing as G. F. W. M. in the DNB)
- Gordon Goodwin (Signing as G. G. in the DNB)
- George Granville Bradley (Signing as G. G. B. in the DNB)
- George Gresley Perry (Signing as G. G. P. in the DNB)
- George Gregory Smith (Signing as G. G. S. in the DNB)
- George Herbert Murray (Signing as G. H. M. in the DNB)
- George John Gray (Signing as G. J. G. in the DNB)
- George Jacob Holyoake (Signing as G. J. H. in the DNB)
- George James Turner (Signing as G. J. T. in the DNB)
- George Knottesford Fortescue (Signing as G. K. F. in the DNB)
- Gerald le Grys Norgate (Signing as G. Le G. N. in the DNB)
- George Gery Milner-Gibson-Cullum (Signing as G. M. G. C. in the DNB)
- Godfrey Noel Richardson (Signing as G. N. R. in the DNB)
- Arthur George Villiers Peel (Signing as G. P. or G. V. P in the DNB)
- George Paul Macdonell (Signing as G. P. M. in the DNB)
- Gerald Patrick Moriarty (Signing as G. P. M-y. in the DNB)
- George Reresby Sitwell (Signing as G. R. S. in the DNB)
- Goldwin Smith (Signing as G. S. in the DNB)
- George Stronach (Signing as G. S-h. in the DNB)
- George Simonds Boulger (Signing as G. S. B. in the DNB)
- George Stockley Cunyer (Signing as G. S. C. in the DNB)
- George Somes Layard (Signing as G. S. L. in the DNB)
- George Thomas Bettany (Signing as G. T. B. in the DNB)
- George Thorn-Drury (Signing as G. T. D. in the DNB)
- George Vere Benson (Signing as G. V. B. in the DNB)
- Arthur George Villiers Peel (Signing as G. V. P. in the DNB)
- Graham Wallas (Signing as G. W. in the DNB)
- George Wardlaw Burnet (Signing as G. W. B. in the DNB)
- George William Campbell (Signing as G. W. C. in the DNB)
- George William Cox (Signing as G. W. C. in the DNB)
- George William Erskine Russell (Signing as G. W. E. R. in the DNB)
- George Washington Moon (Signing as G. W. M. in the DNB)
- George Walter Prothero (Signing as G. W. P. in the DNB)
- George Washington Sprott (Signing as G. W. S. in the DNB)
- George William Thomson Omond (Signing as G. W. T. O. in the DNB)

== H–I ==
- Hubert Ashton Holden (Signing as H. A. H. in the DNB)
- Henry Avray Tipping (Signing as H. A. T. in the DNB)
- Hugh Alexander Webster (Signing as H. A. W. in the DNB)
- Henry Bradley (Signing as H. B. in the DNB)
- Henry Beveridge (1837–1929) (Signing as H. B-e. in the DNB)
- Henry Bruce (Signing as H. B-e. in the DNB)
- Horatius Bonar (Signing as H. B-r. in the DNB)
- Horace Bolingbroke Woodward (Signing as H. B. W. in the DNB)
- Henry Craik (Signing as H. C. in the DNB)
- Henry Charles Beeching (Signing as H. C. B. in the DNB)
- Henry Charles Moore (Signing as H. C. M. in the DNB)
- Henry Davey (Signing as H. D. in the DNB)
- Herbert Edward Douglas Blakiston (Signing as H. E. D. B. in the DNB)
- Herbert Eustace Maxwell (Signing as H. E. M. in the DNB)
- Herbert Edward Ryle (Signing as H. E. R. in the DNB)
- Henry Furneaux (Signing as H. F. in the DNB)
- Henry Frederick Baker (Signing as H. F. B. in the DNB)
- Henry Frank Heath (Signing as H. F. H. in the DNB)
- Henry Forster Morley (Signing as H. F. M. in the DNB)
- Henry Fleetwood Sheppard (Signing as H. F. S. in the DNB)
- Henry George Keene (1826–1915) (Signing as H. G. K. in the DNB)
- Henry George Willink (Signing as H. G. W. in the DNB)
- Hubert Hall (Signing as H. H. in the DNB)
- Henry Higgs (Signing as H. H.-s. in the DNB)
- Herbert Harlakenden Gilchrist (Signing as H. H. G. in the DNB)
- Holcombe Ingleby (Signing as H. I. in the DNB)
- Henry Jenner (Signing as H. J. in the DNB)
- Henry James Robinson (Signing as H. J. R. in the DNB)
- Henry Knollys (journalist) (Signing as H. K. in the DNB)
- Henry Leigh Bennett (Signing as H. L. B. in the DNB)
- Hamon le Strange (Signing as H. le S. in the DNB)
- Henry Lewis Thompson (Signing as H. L. T. in the DNB)
- Hugh Miller (Signing as H. M. in the DNB)
- Henry Manners Chichester (Signing as H. M. C. in the DNB)
- Henry Morse Stephens (Signing as H. M. S. in the DNB)
- Henry Maxwell Spooner (Signing as H. M. S. in the DNB)
- Henry Meredith Vibart (Signing as H. M. V. in the DNB)
- Henry Nettleship (Signing as H. N. in the DNB)
- Henry Paton (Signing as H. P. in the DNB)
- Henry Palin Gurney (Signing as H. P. G. in the DNB)
- Herbert Rix (Signing as H. R. in the DNB)
- Hastings Rashdall (Signing as H. R.-l. in the DNB)
- Henry Riversdale Grenfell (Signing as H. R. G. in the DNB)
- Harry Reginald Holland Hall (Signing as H. R. H. in the DNB)
- Henry Richards Luard (Signing as H. R. L. in the DNB)
- Henry Richard Tedder (Signing as H. R. T. in the DNB)
- Herbert Stephen (Signing as H. S.-n. in the DNB)
- Henry Stubbs (Signing as H. S. in the DNB)
- Henry Scott-Holland (Signing as H. S.-H. in the DNB)
- Henry Stephens Salt (Signing as H. S. S. in the DNB)
- Harold Lyon Thomson (Signing as H. L. T. in the DNB)
- Henry Trueman Wright Wood (Signing as H. T. W. in the DNB)
- Henri van Laun (Signing as H. v. L. in the DNB)
- Henry William Ball (Signing as H. W. B. in the DNB)
- Henry William Lumsden (Signing as H. W. L. in the DNB)
- Hugh Wodehouse Pearse (Signing as H. W. P. in the DNB)
- Herbert Woodfield Paul (Signing as H. W. P. in the DNB)
- Ingram Bywater (Signing as I. B. in the DNB)
- Israel Gollancz (Signing as I. G. in the DNB)
- Isaac Saunders Leadam (Signing as I. S. L. in the DNB)

== J ==
- John Ashton (Signing as J. A. in the DNB)
- John Anderson (Signing as J. A-n. in the DNB)
- James Augustus Atkinson (Signing as J. A. A. in the DNB)
- John Adam Cramb (Signing as J. A. C. in the DNB)
- John Andrew Doyle (Signing as J. A. D. in the DNB)
- Julia Anne Elizabeth Roundell (Signing as J. A. E. R. in the DNB)
- John Alexander Fuller Maitland (Signing as J. A. F. M. in the DNB)
- John Andrew Hamilton (Signing as J. A. H. in the DNB)
- John Alexander Herbert (Signing as J. A. H-t. in the DNB)
- John Austin Jenkins (Signing as J. A. J. in the DNB)
- Jesse Alfred Twemlow (Signing as J. A. T. in the DNB)
- James Britten (Signing as J. B. in the DNB)
- John Brown (reverend) (Signing as J. B-n. in the DNB)
- James Burnley (Signing as J. B.-Y. in the DNB)
- James Burnley (Signing as J. B-y. in the DNB)
- James Beresford Atlay (Signing as J. B. A. in the DNB)
- John Burn Bailey (Signing as J. B. B. in the DNB)
- James Bass Mullinger (Signing as J. B. M. in the DNB)
- Joseph Baldwin Nias (Signing as J. B. N. in the DNB)
- James Balfour Paul (Signing as J. B. P. in the DNB)
- John Bruce Payne (Signing as J. B. P. in the DNB)
- James Cooper (Signing as J. C. in the DNB)
- James Cranstoun (Signing as J. C. in the DNB)
- James Cranstoun (Signing as J. C-n. in the DNB)
- John Churton Collins (Signing as J. C. C. in the DNB)
- James Caxton Dibdin (Signing as J. C. D. in the DNB)
- James Cuthbert Hadden (Signing as J. C. H. in the DNB)
- James Charles Mathew (Signing as J. C. M. in the DNB)
- John Cotter Macdonnell (Signing as J. C. M.-l. in the DNB)
- James Dixon (Signing as J. D. in the DNB)
- James Dredge (Signing as J. D.-e. in the DNB)
- James Dallas (Signing as J. D-s. in the DNB)
- James Duff Duff (Signing as J. D. D. in the DNB)
- John Donohoe FitzGerald (Signing as J. D. F. in the DNB)
- John Eglington Bailey (Signing as J. E. B. in the DNB)
- James Edmund Harting (Signing as J. E. H. in the DNB)
- John Edward Lloyd (Signing as J. E. L. in the DNB)
- John Ferguson (Signing as J. F.-n. in the DNB)
- John Findlay (United States politician) (Signing as J. F.-y. in the DNB)
- Joseph Frank Payne (Signing as J. F. P. in the DNB)
- John Frome Wilkinson (Signing as J. F. W. in the DNB)
- James Gairdner (Signing as J. G. in the DNB)
- John Goldworth Alger (Signing as J. G. A. in the DNB)
- James Gainsborough Fotheringham (Signing as J. G. F. in the DNB)
- Joshua Girling Fitch (Signing as J. G. F-h. in the DNB)
- James Grant Wilson (Signing as J. G. W. in the DNB)
- Jennett Humphreys (Signing as J. H. in the DNB)
- John Hutchinson (Signing as J. H. in the DNB)
- James Hooper (Signing as J. H.-r. in the DNB)
- Joseph Hirst Lupton (Signing as J. H. L. in the DNB)
- John Henry Overton (Signing as J. H. O. in the DNB)
- John Horace Round (Signing as J. H. R. in the DNB)
- John Horne Stevenson (Signing as J. H. S. in the DNB)
- J. H. Thorpe (Signing as J. H. T. in the DNB)
- James John Hornby (Signing as J. J. H. in the DNB)
- John Joseph Knight (Signing as J. K. in the DNB)
- James Kennedy (Signing as J. K-y. in the DNB)
- James King Hewison (Signing as J. K. H. in the DNB)
- John Knox Laughton (Signing as J. K. L. in the DNB)
- Joseph Lister (Signing as J. L. in the DNB)
- James Lewis Caw (Signing as J. L. C. in the DNB)
- James Leonard Fish (Signing as J. L. F. in the DNB)
- John Llewelyn Davies (Signing as J. Ll. D. in the DNB)
- James Mackinnon (journalist) (Signing as J. M. in the DNB)
- James Mew (Signing as J. M. in the DNB)
- John Macdonell (Signing as J. M-l. in the DNB)
- John Morley (Signing as J. M-y. in the DNB)
- John Miller Gray (Signing as J. M. G. in the DNB)
- James Macdonald Horsburgh (Signing as J. M. H. in the DNB)
- James McMullen Rigg (Signing as J. M. R. in the DNB)
- James Moffat Scott (Signing as J. M. S. in the DNB)
- Joseph Mazzini Wheeler (Signing as J. M. W. in the DNB)
- John Nichol (biographer) (Signing as J. N. in the DNB)
- John Ormsby (translator) (Signing as J. O. in the DNB)
- John Wordsworth (Signing as JOHN SARUM in the DNB)
- John Octavius Johnston (Signing as J. O. J. in the DNB)
- James George Joseph Penderel-Brodhurst (Signing as J. P. B. in the DNB)
- John Parsons Earwaker (Signing as J. P. E. in the DNB)
- Julia Prinsep Stephen (Signing as J. P. S. in the DNB)
- James Rowley (historian) (Signing as J. R. in the DNB)
- James Ramsay MacDonald (Signing as J. R. M. in the DNB)
- James Roderick O'Flanagan (Signing as J. R. O'F. in the DNB)
- Joseph Robson Tanner (Signing as J. R. T. in the DNB)
- James Richard Thursfield (Signing as J. R. T. in the DNB)
- John Addison Russell Washbourn (Signing as J. R. W. in the DNB)
- John Sutherland Black (Signing as J. S. B. in the DNB)
- James Sutherland Cotton (Signing as J. S. C. in the DNB)
- John Scott Keltie (Signing as J. S. K. in the DNB)
- Joseph Sylvester O'Halloran (Signing as J. S. O'H. in the DNB)
- John Savill Vaizey (Signing as J. S. V. in the DNB)
- James Tait (Signing as J. T. in the DNB)
- John Tyndall (Signing as J. T-l. in the DNB)
- James Tait (Signing as J. T-t. in the DNB)
- James Tait Black (Signing as J. T. B. in the DNB)
- John Taylor Brown (Signing as J. T. B. in the DNB)
- John Thomas Gilbert (Signing as J. T. G. in the DNB)
- James Taylor Kay (Signing as J. T. K. in the DNB)
- John Archibald Venn (Signing as J. V. in the DNB)
- John Ward (Signing as J. W. in the DNB)
- John Westby Gibson (Signing as J. W.-G. in the DNB)
- James Williams (Signing as J. W-s. in the DNB)
- John William Allen (Signing as J. W. A. in the DNB)
- John Willis Clark (Signing as J. W. C. in the DNB)
- J. W. Clerke (Signing as J. W. C. in the DNB)
- John Willis Clark (Signing as J. W. C.-K. in the DNB)
- John Willis Clark (Signing as J. W. C-k. in the DNB)
- Joseph Woodfall Ebsworth (Signing as J. W. E. in the DNB)
- John Wesley Hales (Signing as J. W. H. in the DNB)
- John William Mackail (Signing as J. W. M. in the DNB)
- John Walter Sherer (Signing as J. W. S. in the DNB)

== K–L ==
- Kate Norgate (Signing as K. N. in the DNB)
- William Kineton Parkes (Signing as K. P. in the DNB)
- Laurence Binyon (Signing as L. B. in the DNB)
- Lionel Smith Beale (Signing as L. B-e. in the DNB)
- Lionel Henry Cust (Signing as L. C. in the DNB)
- Lloyd Charles Sanders (Signing as L. C. S. in the DNB)
- Louisa Charlotte Tyndall (Signing as L. C. T. in the DNB)
- Leonard Darwin (Signing as L.D. in the DNB)
- Louis Alexander Fagan (Signing as L. F. in the DNB)
- Lydia Miller Middleton (Signing as L. M. M. in the DNB)
- Lucy Maude Manson Scott (Signing as L. M. M. S. in the DNB)
- Leslie Stephen (Signing as L. S. in the DNB)
- Lewis Sergeant (Signing as L. S-t. in the DNB)
- Lucy Toulmin Smith (Signing as L. T. S. in the DNB)
- Lucien Wolf (Signing as L. W. in the DNB)
- Leonard William King (Signing as L. W. K. in the DNB)

== M–O ==
- Mary Bateson (Signing as M. B. in the DNB)
- Montagu Burrows (Signing as M. B. in the DNB)
- Henry Thomas Mackenzie Bell (Signing as M. B-l. in the DNB)
- Montagu Burrows (Signing as M. B-s. in the DNB)
- Mandell Creighton (Signing as M. C. in the DNB)
- Miller Christy (Signing as M. C-y. in the DNB)
- Michael Ernest Sadler (Signing as M. E. S. in the DNB)
- Michael Foster (physiologist) (Signing as M. F. in the DNB)
- Michael Friedländer (Signing as M. F. in the DNB)
- Mountstuart Elphinstone Grant Duff (Signing as M. G. D. in the DNB)
- Morgan George Watkins (Signing as M. G. W. in the DNB)
- Marcus Hartog (Signing as M. H. in the DNB)
- Martin Hood Wilkin (Signing as M. H. W. in the DNB)
- Margaret MacArthur (Signing as M. M'A. in the DNB)
- Michael MacDonagh (author) (Signing as M. MacD. in the DNB)
- Margaret Maria Verney (Signing as M. M. V. in the DNB)
- Mary Tout (Signing as M. T. in the DNB)
- Nigel Douglas Frith Pearce (Signing as N. D. F. P. in the DNB)
- Archibald Grove (Signing as N. G. in the DNB)
- Norman Moore (Signing as N. M. in the DNB)
- Norman MacColl (Signing as N. MacC. in the DNB)
- Norman MacColl (Signing as N. McC. in the DNB)
- Nicholas Pocock (historian) (Signing as N. P. in the DNB)
- Osmund Airy (Signing as O. A. in the DNB)
- Oscar Browning (Signing as O. B. in the DNB)
- Octavian Blewitt (Signing as O. B-t. in the DNB)
- Osborne William Tancock (Signing as O. W. T. in the DNB)

== P–R ==
- Percy Arthur Barnett (Signing as P. A. B. in the DNB)
- Percy Arthur Barnett (Signing as P. A. H. in the DNB)
- Peter Aloysius Sillard (Signing as P. A. S. in the DNB)
- Preston Bruce Austin (Signing as P. B.-A. in the DNB)
- Preston Bruce Austin (Signing as P. B. A. in the DNB)
- Percy Ewing Matheson (Signing as P. E. M. in the DNB)
- Philip Henry Bagenal (Signing as P. H. B. in the DNB)
- Peter John Anderson (Signing as P. J. A. in the DNB)
- Philip Joseph Hartog (Signing as P. J. H. in the DNB)
- Philip le Maistre (Signing as P. L. M. in the DNB)
- Pierce Laurence Nolan (Signing as P. L. N. in the DNB)
- Paul Waterhouse (Signing as P. W. in the DNB)
- Patrick Weston Joyce (Signing as P. W. J. in the DNB)
- Robert Adamson (Signing as R. A. in the DNB)
- Richard Alexander Johnson (Signing as R. A. J. in the DNB)
- Robert Avey Ward (Signing as R. A. W. in the DNB)
- Ronald Bayne (Signing as R. B. in the DNB)
- Richard Bagwell (Signing as R. B-l. in the DNB)
- Robert Bowes (Signing as R. B-s. in the DNB)
- Richard Barry O'Brien (Signing as R. B. O'B. in the DNB)
- Richard Bissell Prosser (Signing as R. B. P. in the DNB)
- Robert Blair Swinton (Signing as R. B. S. in the DNB)
- Richard Charles Browne (Signing as R. C. B. in the DNB)
- Richard Copley Christie (Signing as R. C. C. in the DNB)
- Richard Claverhouse Jebb (Signing as R. C. J. in the DNB)
- Robert Dunlop (Signing as R. D. in the DNB)
- Robert Edward Anderson (Signing as R. E. A. in the DNB)
- Robert Edmund Graves (Signing as R. E. G. in the DNB)
- Rowland Edmund Prothero (Signing as R. E. P. in the DNB)
- Reginald Edward Thompson (Signing as R. E. T. in the DNB)
- Robert Farquharson Sharp (Signing as R. F. S. in the DNB)
- Richard Garnett (writer) (Signing as R. G. in the DNB)
- Robert Harrison (Signing as R. H. in the DNB)
- Robert MacKenzie Holden (Signing as R. H. in the DNB)
- Richard Hooper (Signing as R. H-r. in the DNB)
- Robert Hunt (Signing as R. H-t. in the DNB)
- Robert Henry Brodie (Signing as R. H. B. in the DNB)
- Richard Holt Hutton (Signing as R. H. H. in the DNB)
- Robin Humphrey Legge (Signing as R. H. L. in the DNB)
- Robert Hamilton Vetch (Signing as R. H. V. in the DNB)
- Rees M. Jenkin Jones (Signing as R. J. J. in the DNB)
- Reginald John Smith (Signing as R. J. S. in the DNB)
- Robert Kennaway Douglas (Signing as R. K. D. in the DNB)
- Richard Lydekker (Signing as R. L. in the DNB)
- Robert Langton Douglas (Signing as R. L. D. in the DNB)
- Reginald Lane-Poole (Signing as R. L. P. in the DNB)
- Robert Macpherson (Signing as R. M. in the DNB)
- Rose Marian Bradley (Signing as R. M. B. in the DNB)
- Rees M. Jenkin Jones (Signing as R. M. J. J. in the DNB)
- Robert Michael Sillard (Signing as R. M. S. in the DNB)
- Robert Mark Wenley (Signing as R. M. W. in the DNB)
- Rosa Harriet Newmarch (Signing as R. N. in the DNB)
- Robert Perceval Graves (Signing as R. P. G. in the DNB)
- Rustomji Pestonji Karkaria (Signing as R. P. K. in the DNB)
- Robert Sinker (Signing as R. S. in the DNB)
- Robert Steele (Signing as R. S. in the DNB)
- Richard Saul Ferguson (Signing as R. S. F. in the DNB)
- Richard Tetley Glazebrook (Signing as R. T. G. in the DNB)
- Robert Williams (Signing as R. W. in the DNB)
- Robert William Burnie (Signing as R. W. B. in the DNB)
- Richard Watson Dixon (Signing as R. W. D. in the DNB)
- Robert Yelverton Tyrrell (Signing as R. Y. T. in the DNB)

== S–U ==
- Sheldon Amos (Signing as S. A. in the DNB)
- Sidney Colvin (Signing as S. C. in the DNB)
- Samuel Cheetham (Signing as S. C.-m in the DNB)
- Stephen Edward Wheeler (Signing as S. E. W. in the DNB)
- Sydney Francis Gedge (Signing as S. F. G. in the DNB)
- Samuel James Augustus Salter (Signing as S. J. A. S. in the DNB)
- Sidney James Mark Low (Signing as S. J. L. in the DNB)
- Samuel Joseph Nicholl (Signing as S. J. N. in the DNB)
- Stuart Johnson Reid (Signing as S. J. R. in the DNB)
- Sidney Lee (Signing as S. L. in the DNB)
- Stanley Lane-Poole (Signing as S. L-P. in the DNB)
- Sidney Lee (Signing as S. L. L. in the DNB)
- Mrs. May (Signing as S. L. M. in the DNB)
- Stanley Lane-Poole (Signing as S. L. P. in the DNB)
- Sidney Oldall Addy (Signing as S. O. A. in the DNB)
- Samuel Pasfield Oliver (Signing as S. P. O. in the DNB)
- Silvanus Phillips Thompson (Signing as S. P. T. in the DNB)
- Samuel Rolles Driver (Signing as S. R. D. in the DNB)
- Samuel Rawson Gardiner (Signing as S. R. G. in the DNB)
- Samuel Smith (Signing as S. S. in the DNB)
- Samuel Timmins (Signing as S. T. in the DNB)
- Stephen Edward Wheeler (Signing as S. W. in the DNB)
- Spencer Walpole (Signing as S. W.-e. in the DNB)
- Sarah Wilson (Signing as S. W-n. in the DNB)
- Thomas Andrew Archer (Signing as T. A. A. in the DNB)
- Thomas Wilson Bayne (Signing as T. B. in the DNB)
- Thomas Blair Browning (Signing as T. B. B. in the DNB)
- Thomas Boston Johnstone (Signing as T. B. J. in the DNB)
- Thomas Bailey Saunders (Signing as T. B. S. in the DNB)
- Thomas Banks Strong (Signing as T. B. S. in the DNB)
- Thompson Cooper (Signing as T. C. in the DNB)
- Theodore Cracraft Hope (Signing as T. C. H. in the DNB)
- Thomas Erskine Holland (Signing as T. E. H. in the DNB)
- Thomas Evan Jacob (Signing as T. E. J. in the DNB)
- Thomas Edward Kebbel (Signing as T. E. K. in the DNB)
- Thomas Ethelbert Page (Signing as T. E. P. in the DNB)
- Thomas Fowler (Signing as T. F. in the DNB)
- Thomas Finlayson Henderson (Signing as T. F. H. in the DNB)
- Thomas Frederick Tout (Signing as T. F. T. in the DNB)
- Thomas Firminger Thiselton Dyer (Signing as T. F. T. D. in the DNB)
- Thomas Greer (senator) (Signing as T. G. in the DNB)
- Thomas George Bonney (Signing as T. G. B. in the DNB)
- Thomas Graves Law (Signing as T. G. L. in the DNB)
- Thomas Hamilton (1842–1926) (Signing as T. H. in the DNB)
- Thomas Hodgkin (Signing as T. H-n. in the DNB)
- Thomas Hudson Beare (Signing as T. H. B. in the DNB)
- Hall Caine (Signing as T. H. C. in the DNB)
- Thomas Humphry Ward (Signing as T. H. W. in the DNB)
- Thomas Johnstone (Signing as T. J. in the DNB)
- Thomas Knyvett Richmond (Signing as T. K. R. in the DNB)
- Theodore Martin (Signing as T. M. in the DNB)
- Thomas Olden (Signing as T. O. in the DNB)
- Thomas Parkinson (Signing as T. P. in the DNB)
- Thomas Seccombe (Signing as T. S. in the DNB) volumes: 34 incomplete
- Thomas Sinclair (Signing as T. S. in the DNB) volumes: incomplete
- Thomas Scattergood (Signing as T. S.-d. in the DNB)
- Theodore Walrond (Signing as T. W. in the DNB)
- Thomas Whittaker (Signing as T. W.-R. in the DNB)
- Thomas Whittaker (Signing as T. W-r. in the DNB)
- Thomas William Rhys Davids (Signing as T. W. R. D. in the DNB)
- Thomas William Snagge (Signing as T. W. S. in the DNB)

== W–Z ==
- Walter Armstrong (art historian) (Signing as W. A. in the DNB)
- William Alexander Greenhill (Signing as W. A. G. in the DNB)
- William Arthur Jobson Archbold (Signing as W. A. J. A. in the DNB)
- William Arthur Shaw (Signing as W. A. S. in the DNB)
- William Albert Samuel Hewins (Signing as W. A. S. H. in the DNB)
- William Aldis Wright (Signing as W. A. W. in the DNB)
- William Benham (priest) (Signing as W. B. in the DNB)
- William Bayne (1858–1922) (Signing as W. B-e. in the DNB)
- William Broadfoot (Signing as W. B-t. in the DNB)
- William Boswell Lowther (Signing as W. B. L. in the DNB)
- William Barclay Squire (Signing as W. B. S. in the DNB)
- Wilkie Collins (Signing as W. C. in the DNB)
- Walter Baker Clode (Signing as W. C-e. in the DNB)
- William Carr (Signing as W. C.-r. in the DNB)
- William Connor Sydney (Signing as W. C. S. in the DNB)
- William Dunn Macray (Signing as W. D. M. in the DNB)
- William Dundas Walker (Signing as W. D. W. in the DNB)
- William Edward Armytage Axon (Signing as W. E. A. A. in the DNB)
- William Elliott Doubleday (Signing as W. E. D. in the DNB)
- Walter Evelyn Manners (Signing as W. E. M. in the DNB)
- Walter Eustace Rhodes (Signing as W. E. R. in the DNB)
- William Forsyth (Signing as W. F. in the DNB)
- William Foster (Signing as W. F. in the DNB)
- Walter Frank Raphael Weldon (Signing as W. F. R. W. in the DNB)
- William Fellows Sedgwick (Signing as W. F. S. in the DNB)
- William Francis Wallis (Signing as W. F. W. in the DNB)
- Wentworth Francis Wentworth-Sheilds (Signing as W. F. W. S. in the DNB)
- William Galloway (Signing as W. G. in the DNB)
- William George (Signing as W. G. in the DNB)
- William Gee (Signing as W. G.-e in the DNB)
- William George (Signing as W. G.-ge. in the DNB)
- William Garden Blaikie (Signing as W. G. B. in the DNB)
- William George Black (Signing as W. G. B-k. in the DNB)
- William George Bernard Page (Signing as W. G. B. P. in the DNB)
- William George Dimock Fletcher (Signing as W. G. D. F. in the DNB)
- William Hunt (Signing as W. H. in the DNB)
- Walter Hepworth (Signing as W. H-h. in the DNB)
- William Haines (Signing as W. H.-s. in the DNB)
- William Hayman Cummings (Signing as W. H. C. in the DNB)
- William Henry Fremantle (Signing as W. H. F. in the DNB)
- William Henry Flower (Signing as W. H. F.-r. in the DNB)
- William Holden Hutton (Signing as W. H. H. in the DNB)
- Walter Hawken Tregellas (Signing as W. H. T. in the DNB)
- William Henry Wesley (Signing as W. H. W. in the DNB)
- William Jerome Harrison (Signing as W. J. H. in the DNB)
- William John Hardy (Signing as W. J. H-y. in the DNB)
- William John Lawrence (Signing as W. J. L. in the DNB)
- Walter Lewin (Signing as W. L. in the DNB)
- John Westland Marshall (Signing as W. M. in the DNB)
- Witham Matthew Bywater (Signing as W. M. B. in the DNB)
- William Perkins (Signing as W. P.-S in the DNB)
- William Prideaux Courtney (Signing as W. P. C. in the DNB)
- William Roberts (Signing as W. R. in the DNB)
- Walter Rye (Signing as W. R. in the DNB)
- William Alexander Reynell (Signing as W. R-l. in the DNB)
- William Raymond Lluellyn (Signing as W. R. Ll. in the DNB)
- William Richard Morfill (Signing as W. R. M. in the DNB)
- William Rae MacDonald (Signing as W. R. M.-d. in the DNB)
- William Robertson Nicoll (Signing as W. R. N. in the DNB)
- William Robertson Smith (Signing as W. R. S. in the DNB)
- William Rees Williams (Signing as W. R. W. in the DNB)
- William Richard Wood Stephens (Signing as W. R. W. S. in the DNB)
- William Sanday (theologian) (Signing as W. S. in the DNB)
- William Salt Brassington (Signing as W. S. B. in the DNB)
- William Selby Church (Signing as W. S. C. in the DNB)
- William Samuel Lilly (Signing as W. S. L. in the DNB)
- William Tennant Gairdner (Signing as W. T. G. in the DNB)
- William Urwick (Signing as W. U. in the DNB)
- Warwick William Wroth (Signing as W. W. in the DNB)
- William Walter Merry (Signing as W. W. M. in the DNB)
- William Weir Tulloch (Signing as W. W. T. in the DNB)
- William Wilfrid Webb (Signing as W. W. W. in the DNB)
- William Younger Fletcher (Signing as W. Y. F. in the DNB)

== Source ==
- This list is sourced from the Dictionary of National Biography, now in the public domain.
