= George Atherton Aitken =

British civil servant

- Born: 19 March 1860; Barkingside, Essex, England
- Died: 16 November 1917 (aged 57); Hampstead, London, England
- Education: University College London
- Occupations: British civil servant, author, scholar, literary biographer
- Spouse: Emma Cawthorne (m. 1903)

George Atherton Aitken CB, MVO (19 March 1860 – 16 November 1917) was a British civil servant, author, scholar, a literary biographer and a book collector. During his lifetime, Aitken became an expert on the Queen Anne period of English literature.

== Public service ==
Aitken completed his studies at University College London with a degree in English. He entered the Civil Service in 1883, taking up a position within the Secretary's Office of the General Post Office. He benefited on a personal level from the reforms during this time within the postal system, which included the provision of a private library and reading room for its employees to encourage intellectual development. He published his first book in 1889.

Aitken transferred to the Home Office in 1892. He was responsible for legislation that brought about improvements to Child Welfare, working under the future Home Office Secretary, Herbert Samuel. The passing of the Children Act 1908 (8 Edw. 7. c. 67), consolidated and simplified existing legislation on child welfare and, most significantly, created a juvenile justice system.

Aitken was recognised in his profession as a career civil servant, receiving a number of promotions, where he eventually was elevated to the position of Assistant Secretary, becoming the first Head of the Children's Department at the Home Office in 1913.

For his efforts in children's education, he was honored as a Member of the Royal Victorian Order (MVO) in 1911 and as a Companion of the Order of the Bath (CB) in 1917.

== Author and biographer ==
Aitken was an author and a literary biographer. He was also an editor and an “author of introduction” of numerous works from numerous celebrated writers.

=== Published works (in chronological order) ===
- The life of Richard Steele (1889) - published by William Isbister Ltd
- The life and works of John Arbuthnot, M.D., fellow of the Royal College of Physicians (1892)
- The poetic works of Robert Burns (1893)
- Later Stuart tracts (1903)

=== Notable Contribution ===
- The manuscripts of the Duke of Beaufort, K.G., the earl of Donoughmore, and others.

=== Contribution to the Dictionary of National Biography ===
Between 1885 and 1900, Aitken wrote numerous biographical articles for the Dictionary of National Biography. His articles are designated by the initials "G.A.A." Aitken features prominently within the list of contributors.

== Collector of books and manuscripts ==
During his lifetime he gathered an extensive collection of rare manuscripts and books, including multiple copies of each edition of the works of Geoffrey Chaucer, which were printed between 1532 and 1602.

== Academic contribution ==
Aitken served as a Governor of University College, London.

== Legacy ==
An inventory of his book collection is held at the Harry Ransom Center, Austin, Texas. Part of the University of Texas, it is currently recognised as having the largest collection of early printed editions of Geoffrey Chaucer. At least 17 editions formed part of the Aitken's own collection.

The Folger Shakespeare Library holds a signed letter from him to Augustin Daly dated 19 February 1894.

== Personal ==
Aitken was born on 19 March 1860 in Barkingside, Essex. The son of John Aitken and Mary Ann Salmon. He had no siblings.

At the age of 43, he married Emma Cawthorne on 18 April 1903, two years his senior. His wife was a former headmistress at Coborn School. He had no children.

Aitken died in Hampstead, North London at the age of 57 on 16 November 1917. He is buried at St John-at-Hampstead Churchyard.
