= William Fraser Rae =

Scottish journalist and author

William Fraser Rae (1835–1905) was a Scottish journalist and author.

== Life ==
Born in Edinburgh on 3 March 1835, he was the elder son of George Rae and his wife, Catherine Fraser, both of Edinburgh. After education at Moffat Academy and Heidelberg University, he entered Lincoln's Inn as a student on 2 November 1857, and on 30 April 1861 was called to the bar. But he then gave up the law for a career as a journalist.

Rae edited for a time about 1860 The Reader, and early joined the staff of the Daily News, sympathetic to its liberal politics, as a special correspondent in Canada and the United States. Throat trouble led him to spend time at Austrian health resorts.

In his last years Rae felt his lack of recognition. He reviewed for The Athenæum, whose editor Norman MacColl was a close friend, and spent his time mainly at the Reform Club; he had joined in 1860, and was chairman of the library committee from 1873 till his death. He died on 21 January 1905 at 13 South Parade, Bath, Somerset, and was buried at Bath.

== Works ==
On his articles for the Daily News, Rae based the volume Westward by Rail (1870; 3rd edit. 1874), sequel Columbia and Canada: Notes on the Great Republic and the New Dominion (1877). There subsequently appeared Newfoundland to Manitoba (1881; with maps) and Facts about Manitoba (1882); reprinted articles from The Times, the source also for Austrian Health Resorts, and the Bitter Waters of Hungary (1888; 2nd edit. 1889). In The Business of Travel (1891) he described the methods of Thomas Cook & Son, the travel agents, and a visit produced Egypt to-day; the First to the Third Khedive (1892).

Rae saw success as the translator of Edmond About's Handbook of Social Economy (1872; 2nd edit. 1885) and Hippolyte Taine's Notes on England (1873; 8th edit. 1885). Taking up English political history of the 18th century, in 1874 he brought outWilkes, Sheridan, and Fox: or the Opposition under George III, which echoed the style of Thomas Babington Macaulay. On the question of the identity of Junius, he wroteoften in The Athenæum from 1888, for over the decade: with Charles Wentworth Dilke and the Athenæum tradition, he rejected the identification of Junius with Sir Philip Francis.

With the aid of Lord Dufferin and others connected with the family, Rae researched Richard Brinsley Sheridan and tried to improve his reputation. Sheridan, a Biography (2 vols. 1896) dispelled some rumours, but failed as a whitewash. In 1902 he published Sheridan's Plays, now printed as he wrote them, with A Journey to Bath, an unpublished comedy by Frances Sheridan.

Rae wrote the preface to Charles W. Vincent's Catalogue of the Library of the Reform Club (1883; 2nd and revised edit. 1894), and contributed to the Dictionary of National Biography. He published anonymously in 1873 Men of the Third Republic, and translated English Portraits, from Sainte-Beuve, in 1875. In fiction, Rae wrote three-volume novels: Miss Bayle's Romance (1887), followed by A Modern Brigand (1888), Maygrove (1890), and An American Duchess (1891).

== Family ==
Rae married, on 29 August 1860, Sara Eliza, second daughter of James Fordati of the Isle of Man and London. She died at Franzensbad, where Rae and herself were frequent autumn visitors, on 29 August 1902; she left two daughters.
