= William Littlejohn O'Halloran =

William Littlejohn O'Halloran (5 May 1806 – 15 July 1885) was a British Army officer and public servant in South Australia.

== Early life and army ==
O'Halloran was born in Ireland on 5 May 1806(or born at Berhampore, India, and came to England in 1811) the son of Major-General Sir Joseph O'Halloran, G.C.B., a grandson of Irish surgeon Sylvester O'Halloran, and brother of Thomas Shuldham O'Halloran. He entered the army as ensign in the 14th Foot in 1823 (or 11 January 1824), and after brilliant service in India, particularly at the siege and storming of Bhurtpore, Bengal (medal), obtaining his lieutenancy in action.

In April 1827 he exchanged into the 38th regiment; served on the staff, with his brother, Major T. S. O'Halloran, of his father at Saugor, Central India; and was employed on recruiting service in Belfast from 1832 to 1834. In the latter year he embarked for Sydney with a detachment of the 50th regiment. Thence he sailed for Calcutta, joined the 38th regiment at Chinsorah in 1835, and accompanied it to England in 1836. He obtained his company by purchase on 29 December 1837, and retired from the army in April 1840.

== South Australia ==
O'Halloran emigrated to the colony of South Australia, arriving in Port Adelaide in August 1840 aboard the barque Lalla Rookh.

In August 1841 he was appointed a justice of the peace, appointed a member of the Audit Board in 1843, and subsequently became private secretary to Governor Sir George Grey, and clerk of the Executive Council. He was appointed Auditor-General, in succession to Francis Singleton, in 1851, and held the position till 1868, when he finally retired from the public service.

== Family and later life ==
O'Halloran married in 1831 Eliza Minton, daughter of John Montague Smyth. They had two daughters and three sons, the eldest of whom, Joseph Sylvester O'Halloran was secretary to the Royal Colonial Institute.

He died on 15 July 1885.
