= Joseph Sylvester O'Halloran =

Joseph Sylvester O'Halloran, CMG FRGS (28 March 1842 – 29 January 1920) was Secretary of the Royal Colonial Institute 1883 to 1909.

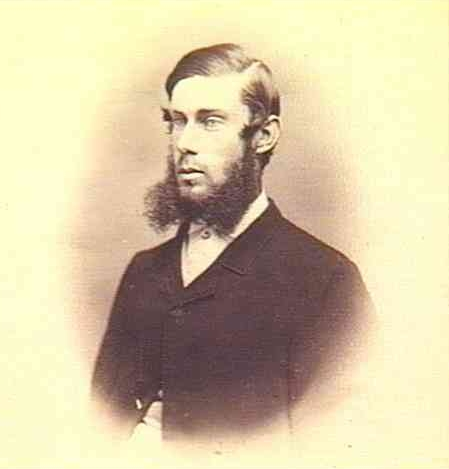
Joseph Sylvester O'Halloran, ca. 1875

== Career in Australia ==
O'Halloran was born at Adelaide, South Australia, was the son of Captain William Littlejohn O'Halloran and his wife Eliza Minton O'Halloran. He was educated at private schools, and entered the South Australian Civil Service, receiving his first appointment from Sir Richard Graves MacDonnell, the then Governor. After passing ten years in the Audit Office, and rising to the third position in that department, he was promoted to the clerkship of the Executive Council, being at the same time gazetted Clerk to the Court of Appeals. These offices he retained until 1871, and, in addition, acted for a while as private secretary to the Right Hon. Sir James Fergusson, 6th Baronet, Governor of the colony. In consequence of certain reductions in the estimates, which involved several departmental changes, O'Halloran retired from the Government service in 1871, with compensation for loss of office, the Governor in Council recording his testimony to the honourable manner in which he had discharged his duties. Soon after his retirement O'Halloran came to England, was elected a Fellow of the Royal Geographical Society and of the Royal Colonial Institute, and found occupation in the city of London, where he filled secretarial appointments for a period extending over seven years. In 1872 he acted—in conjunction with Dr. C. W. Eddy—as honorary secretary and a member of the committee for celebrating the opening of telegraphic communication with Australia.

== Later career ==
In 1873 he proceeded to New Zealand, and travelled through both islands, collecting information in connection with some elaborate investigations which had been conducted in London with a view to the application of an improved process for the extraction of the fibre of the Phormium tenax. He visited the Cape of Good Hope in 1877, and in the succeeding year revisited Australia. In April 1881 he was appointed assistant-secretary and librarian of the Royal Colonial Institute, and in December 1883 was promoted to the position of secretary. In 1882 he proceeded to North-Western Canada, which was then attracting much attention, for the purpose of acquainting himself with its capabilities as a field for settlement. In 1884 he again visited Canada, attending the Montreal meeting of the British Association for the Advancement of Science as one of the secretaries to the Geographical Section, the president of which section publicly acknowledged his services. Before returning to England he made an extended tour through Nova Scotia, New Brunswick, and Prince Edward Island. In 1885 he attended the Aberdeen meeting, again undertaking the secretaryship of Section E. Mr. O'Halloran was a member of the London committee of the Jubilee Exhibition held at Adelaide in 1887. He was married, at the parish church, Cheltenham, Gloucestershire, England, on 17 August 1886, to Alice Mary, daughter of the Henry Simpson, of "Ridge Park", Glen Osmond, South Australia.

On his retirement from the secretaryship of the Institute in 1909 Mr. O'Halloran was made an honorary Fellow, and continued to take a keen interest in the work of the Institute. O'Halloran was a contributor to the Dictionary of National Biography (as J. S. O'H).

He died in Cheltenham, England. Edward White O'Halloran, Adelaide solicitor, was a brother.
