= Joseph O'Halloran =

Major-General Sir Joseph O'Halloran GCB (13 August 1763 – 3 November 1843) was an army officer in the East India Company.

== Background ==
O'Halloran was the youngest son of Sylvester O'Halloran, born in county Limerick, Ireland. On 22 February 1781 he was appointed midshipman on board the East India Company's sloop of war Swallow, and in July that year obtained an infantry cadetship; was made ensign in the Bengal army on 9 May 1782 and lieutenant on 6 January 1785. In 1790 he married, and on 7 January 1796 became captain.

== Indian Service ==
From June 1796 to October 1802 he was adjutant and quartermaster at Midnapúr, and was attached to the public works department. On the abolition of his office he rejoined his corps, the late 18th Bengal native infantry. In September 1803 he accompanied a force of all arms which crossed the Jumna for the subjugation of Bundelkund, and on 12 October defeated fifteen thousand Marathas at Kopsah. His gallantry at the sieges of Bursaar and Jeswarree in January 1804 led to his appointment to supervise the operation irregular force of two thousand men, under Shaik Kurub Ali, in the interior of Bundelkund. On 15 May he attacked and defeated, after a determined resistance, Raja Rām and ten thousand Bondeelas entrenched among the rocks and hills of Màhābā. On 1 July he commanded two brigades of irregulars in another attack on Raja Rām and a force of sixteen thousand Bondeelas and Naghas on the fortified hills of Thanah and Purswarree. Subsequently, he served at the siege of Saitpur, and in December attacked and stormed several other towns and forts. In January 1805 he captured the forts of Niagacre and Dowra, in Pinwarree, His services were noticed by the Marquis Wellesley. On 1 November 1805 he was appointed commissary of supplies by Lord Lake, and, on the breaking up of the army on 1 June 1806, rejoined his regiment, and on 25 April 1808 attained the rank of major. He commanded the attack on the strongly fortified hill of Rogoulee, in Bundelkund, on 22 January 1809.

Colonel Gabriel Martindell, who commanded in Bundelkund, made O'Halloran his military secretary; and his conduct at the head of the first battalion 18th native infantry at the siege of the fortress of Adjeghur was specially noticed. He became lieutenant-colonel on 4 June 1814, served in the campaigns against the Nepaulese in 1815 and 1816, in the first campaign covering the district of Tirhoot, in the second at the siege of Hurreehurpur, and afterwards commanded his battalion in Cuttack during the disturbances there. For his services he was made C.B. In August 1818 he was sent to join the first battalion 20th native infantry in the Straits Settlements, and on arrival there was appointed commandant of the 25th Bengal native infantry. In January 1825 he was appointed brigadier at Barrackpore. Before leaving he received the thanks of the government of the Straits Settlements for his zeal and marked ability, and received the unusual honour of a salute of eleven guns on his embarkation. In December 1828 he became a brigadier-general, and was appointed to the Saugor division of the army. He became colonel of a regiment on 4 June 1829. With the expiration of his five years' period of staff service, on 23 December 1833, ended his active military career of fifty-three years, during which he had never taken any furlough or leave to Europe.

== Knighthood ==
O'Halloran landed in England in May 1834. In February 1835 he received his knighthood at the hands of King William IV, who observed that the distinction was well earned by his long meritorious and gallant services, and by his consecration of his eight sons to the service of his country. O'Halloran became a major-general on 10 Jan. 1837. He was made KCB in 1837, and GCB in 1841. He became a member of the Royal Asiatic Society of London in 1836, was chosen an honorary member of the Royal Irish Academy in 1838, and received the freedom of his native city of Limerick on 25 February the same year. He died at his residence in Connaught Terrace, Hyde Park, London, on 3 November 1843, from the effects of a street accident, causing fracture of the neck of the thigh-bone. He was buried in the catacombs at Kensal Green cemetery, immediately beneath the chapel. A memorial tablet was placed in the wall of the south cloister.

O'Halloran married, in 1790, Frances, daughter of Colonel Nicholas Bayly, M.P., of Redhill, Surrey, late of the 1st foot-guards, and brother of the first Earl of Uxbridge, by whom he had a large family. His sons included Thomas Shuldham O'Halloran and William Littlejohn O'Halloran.
