= James Mew =

English barrister (1837–1913)

James Mew (1837 – 25 February 1913) was an English barrister and man of letters, a contributor to the Dictionary of National Biography.

== Life ==
He was the son of George Mew of Holborn, educated at Merchant Taylors' School. He matriculated at Wadham College, Oxford in 1855, graduating B.A. in 1860. He was called to the bar at the Inner Temple in 1864.

He died on 25 February 1913.

== Works ==
- Drinks of the World (1893), with John Ashton
- Traditional Aspects of Hell (Ancient and Modern) (1903)
