= Emily Tennyson Bradley =

English author

Emily Tennyson Bradley (29 October 1862 – 25 July 1946) was an English writer.

== Life ==
Bradley was born in Marlborough, Wiltshire, the daughter of George Granville Bradley, the Dean of Westminster, and Marian Philpot Bradley. Alfred, Lord Tennyson was her godfather. In 1893, she married Alexander Murray Smith. In addition to a biography and history, she wrote articles for the Dictionary of National Biography.

A memorial stone in Westminster Abbey recognizes Smith as "historian of the Abbey". She and her sister compiled the Westminster Abbey Official Guide.

== Works ==
- Life of the Lady Arabella Stuart in 2 vols. (1889)
- Annals of Westminster Abbey (1898)
- The Roll-call of Westminster Abbey (1902)
- Contributions to the Dictionary of National Biography, 1885–1900
