= Royal Commonwealth Society =

Non-governmental organisation

- Abbreviation: RCS
- Founded: 1868; 158 years ago
- Type: Non-governmental organisation
- Headquarters: 65 Basinghall Street; London, United Kingdom
- Region served: Commonwealth of Nations
- Official language: English
- Patron: King Charles III
- Website: royalcwsociety.org
- Formerly called: Colonial Society (1868–1869); Royal Colonial Society (1869–1870); Royal Colonial Institute (1870–1928); Royal Empire Society (1928–1958)

The Royal Commonwealth Society (RCS) is a non-governmental organisation with a mission to promote the value of the Commonwealth and the values upon which it is based. The society upholds the values of the Commonwealth Charter, promoting conflict resolution, peace-making and democracy to improve the lives of citizens across the member states of the Commonwealth.

== History ==
=== 1868–1958 ===
What is now the Royal Commonwealth Society was founded in 1868 as a non-political, learned organisation. A royal charter was granted in 1869, and a clubhouse opened in 1885. The society's name slowly evolved – from The Colonial Society (1868–1869), to The Royal Colonial Society (1869–1870), to The Royal Colonial Institute (1870–1928), to The Royal Empire Society (1928–1958). The Royal Commonwealth Society was the name adopted in 1958.

The society may be seen from early on to have been progressive in its time towards equality and diversity. A woman was first invited by The Royal Colonial Institute to read a research paper in 1894, and The Royal Colonial Institute was one of the first learned organisations to admit women as full Fellows, in 1922. The society's first Asian member was Ji ju Sanjo, son of the Japanese prime minister (Sanjo Sanetomi), in 1872. The first African member was Samuel Bannerman, of the Gold Coast, in 1879.

The identity of the society was for more than a hundred years bound up with its library. At a meeting on 26 June 1868, Chichester Parkinson-Fortescue recommended "the formation of a colonial library, to which all interested in the welfare of the colonies should have access," an aim affirmed by the society's first elected chairman, Viscount Bury. The society's first librarian was appointed in 1869, and the first salaried librarian, Australian-born Joseph Sylvester O'Halloran, in 1885. The person mainly responsible for the library's remarkable development and international reputation was Evans Lewin, Master Librarian for thirty-six years, 1910–1946.

The society's first home was above a shirt shop at No. 15 The Strand in London, where it remained from 1870 until 1885. It was in this modest space that the organisation's library collection began to be assembled. The society's library quickly increased in size and reputation, and the organisation moved in 1885 to 18–21 Northumberland Avenue in London. The site was completely rebuilt in 1936 to the design of architect Sir Herbert Baker, providing a greatly extended library. The expanded and renovated premises were formally opened on 12 November 1936 by the Duke and Duchess of York (later King George VI and Queen Elizabeth).

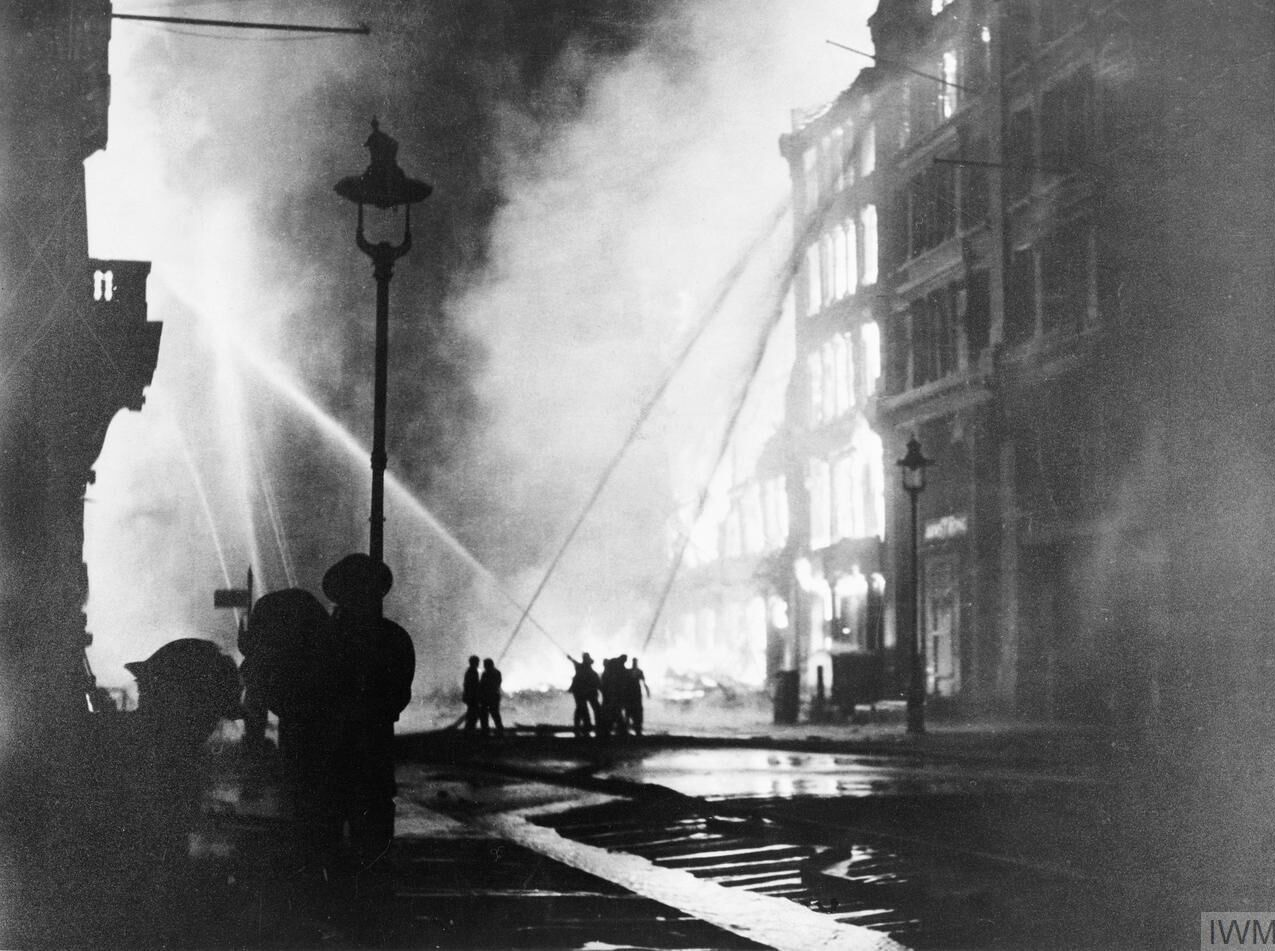
London during the Blitz

The Blitz had a devastating effect on the society's Northumberland Avenue headquarters and library. On the night of 16/17 April 1941, the building was struck by a two-ton bomb. Seventy-four people were present at the time; one member was killed and another injured, and two members of staff badly hurt. Fire ignited by the blast and the large quantity of water pumped in to extinguish it meant some unique collections were destroyed; examples, painstakingly assembled over more than seventy years, included: the Library of Overseas Law, the contents of the Newspaper Room, and sections covering the general British Empire, foreign colonies, the First World War, Malta and Gibraltar. The lost collections on the German colonial empire, the French colonial empire, the Dutch Empire, the Italian Empire, and Belgian overseas colonies – mainly in foreign languages and published overseas – were unique in the United Kingdom. Numerous early accounts of exploration, voyages and travel were likewise destroyed. Out of a collection of 260,000, total losses were estimated at 35,000 books and 5,000 pamphlets. On the night of 10/11 May 1941, the hardest night of the Blitz, the Northumberland Avenue address was again severely damaged.

The society persevered, adopting the "business as usual" motto characteristic of Britons targeted in the Blitz. The subsequent issue of the society's journal United Empire, May–June 1941, reported the resumption of activities including its Saturday afternoon dances for members of the Overseas Armed Forces. Determined attempts were made to replace the library's losses, drawing helpful donations from institutions and individuals, and an award from the War Damage Commission, but many items proved irreplaceable. Full restoration of the society's Northumberland Avenue headquarters was completed in 1957; the building was officially re-opened by Queen Elizabeth II and Prince Philip, Duke of Edinburgh, and a grand festival organised to celebrate the event. The Sunday Times of 14 April 1957 noted that the nose of the 16/17 April 1941 bomb was displayed in a prominent position, reflecting "the true spirit of British sportsmanship".

=== 1958–present ===
"The Royal Commonwealth Society" name was adopted in 1958. Enthusiasm may seem to have surrounded the Commonwealth in the 1950s, but political tides began to flow against the society; for example, newsroom space was taken for the fledgling Voluntary Service Overseas (1961–1963), which began life under the wing of the Royal Commonwealth Society.

The library of the society, despite the damage caused by the German bombing offensive during World War II, grew to over half a million items. The Subject Index to the collection, published in the 1930s, is an invaluable guide to early publications. The Contemporary Review described the collection as "the most comprehensive single source for the history of the world's greatest empire from its 16th century beginnings to its present fifty-nation Commonwealth".

Cambridge University Library recognised the collection as a "treasure-trove" of information on the Commonwealth and Britain's former colonial territories, comprising over 300,000 printed items, about 800 archival collections (including manuscript diaries, correspondence, pictures, cine films, scrapbooks and newspaper cuttings) and over 120,000 photographs. From 1956 to 1987 the society's librarian was Donald Simpson (1920–2002), who had joined the staff in 1945. He was in advance of other librarians of his time in recognising the importance of photographs and ensured that photographic collections were identified and catalogued. He was the author of Dark Companions (1975), a book about the indigenous associates of explorers.

From the late 1960s, however, increasing financial problems, combined with severe flood damage, led to the conclusion that it was no longer viable for the society to maintain its library. Cambridge University Library acquired the library's collection in 1993. There had been a sign of things to come when a notable chairman of the library, Sir Alan Burns (who in 1948 had published a study called Colour Prejudice, a groundbreaking contribution to the subject), resigned from his post in protest at the society's attempt to sell off library books in order to supplement its income.

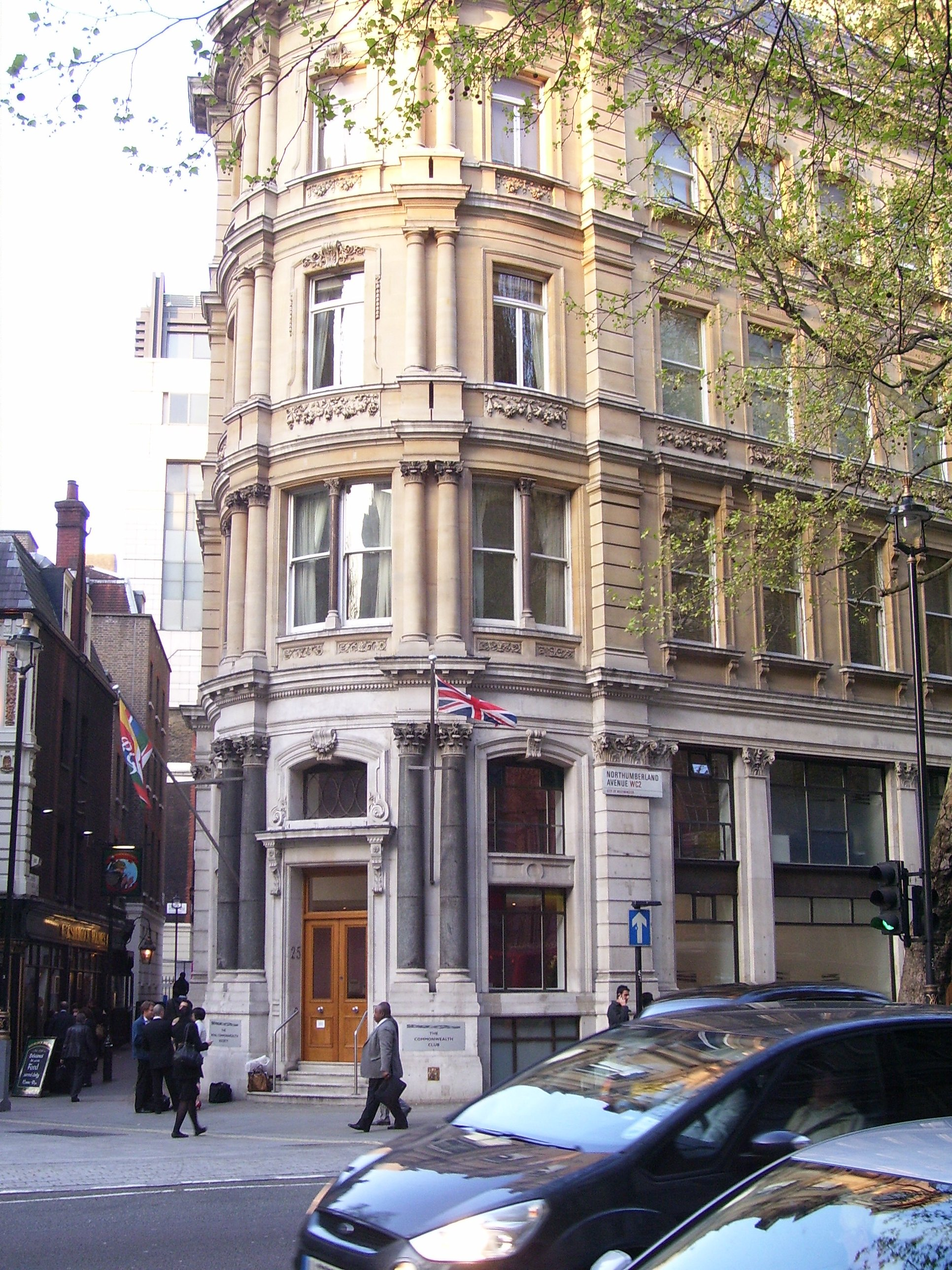
25 Northumberland Avenue in London, the Society's headquarters from 1994 until 2013

Cambridge Library's intervention enabled the society to clear its debts and, in 1994, to redevelop the grand clubhouse at 18–21 Northumberland Avenue (now Citadines Trafalgar Square) to the design of architect Linda Morey Smith. This building was sold and the society purchased a former bank building next door at 25 Northumberland Avenue, but with no accommodation.

By 2012, financial pressures again presented a challenge. The society found it necessary in 2013 to sell its headquarters at 25 Northumberland Avenue, and it moved in 2014 to a new London office on Pall Mall, with a view to focusing on its charitable work.

The Royal Commonwealth Society is now the centre of an international network of more than 10,000 members, spread across 100 countries and territories, and linked by around seventy self-governing Society branches and Commonwealth societies, in forty-three countries and territories. Through its educational, youth and outreach programmes, the society aims to encourage young people to develop skills and, with an increased understanding of their role as global citizens, to engage with challenges facing the international community. It aims to bring alive the principles of the modern Commonwealth – tolerance, diversity, freedom, justice, democracy, human rights, and sustainable development – to a generation living in an increasingly interconnected world. Society projects aim to enable young people to engage with their counterparts across the Commonwealth in youth leadership programmes, and creative writing and film-making projects. Through its charitable programmes and its international network, the society's remit is to work towards the continued growth and resilience of Commonwealth civil society.

The society is one of three bodies supporting The Queen's Commonwealth Canopy, a project launched in 2015 to preserve and promote forested areas throughout the Commonwealth.

The society's Hong Kong office was opened in 1983 and has existed outside of the Commonwealth realm since 1997. The Hong Kong branch's cultural and charitable activities are of sufficient importance that its chairmen are often recognised with appointment to the Order of the British Empire for their services to the Commonwealth community in Hong Kong.

There is also a branch of the Royal Commonwealth Society in the Republic of Ireland, due to Ireland's history as part of both the British Empire and the Commonwealth until 18 April 1949 when the Republic of Ireland Act 1948 came into effect.
