= Ernest Clarke =

Secretary of the Royal Agricultural Society of England (1856–1923)

Ernest Clarke FSA
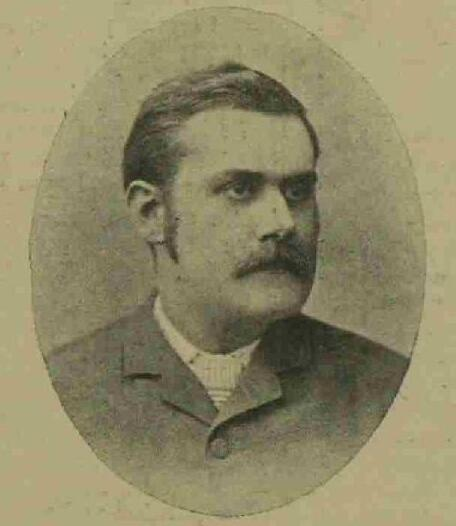
- Born: 21 February 1856; Bury St Edmunds
- Died: 4 March 1923; Tavistock Square

Sir Ernest Clarke (21 February 1856 – 4 March 1923) was an English medical clerk for public health, historian of agriculture, Secretary of the Royal Agricultural Society, antiquarian, folklorist, bibliographer, author, editor, and scholar of folk songs.

== Life ==
After education at King Edward VI School, Bury St Edmunds, Ernest Clarke was a salaried clerk in the medical department of the Local Government Board from 1872 to 1881. From 1881 to 1887 he was Assistant Secretary, Share and Loan Department, London Stock Exchange. From 1887 to 1905 he was Secretary of the Royal Agricultural Society.

Clarke wrote 38 articles for the Dictionary of National Biography and several articles for its first and second supplements. He also wrote for The Nineteenthy Century and other journals. He was the author of History of the Board of agriculture, 1793-1822 (published in 1898) and the editor of a new edition of The Chronicle of Jocelin of Brakelond in 1903 and a 3rd edition in 1907.

During the 1880s he was a valued adviser and coeditor assisting Ernest Hart, the editor-in-chief of the British Medical Journal. Clarke received in 1894 an honorary M.A. from St John's College, Cambridge. In the early 1890s he was a lecturer under Professor John Wrightson at Downton Agricultural College. At Cambridge, he was a university lecturer on agricultural history from 1896 to 1899 (and was also the University of Cambridge's first such lecturer). At Cambridge he was also the Gilbey Lecturer in History and Economics of Agriculture from 1897 to 1901.

He was elected a Fellow of the Royal Statistical Society in 1882. He was knighted in 1898 and was made Chevalier de l'ordre du Mérite agricole in 1889. He was made an honorary member of several foreign agricultural societies.

Sir Ernest Clarke married Marguerite Prevost, daughter of James Prevost of Leghorn, in 1880. She died in May 1918.

== Works ==
- (ed.) Jocelin of Brakelond (1903), The Chronicle of Jocelin Brakelond: A Picture of Monastic Life in the Days of Abbott Samson, London: De La More Press.
