= Henry Simpson (shipping) =

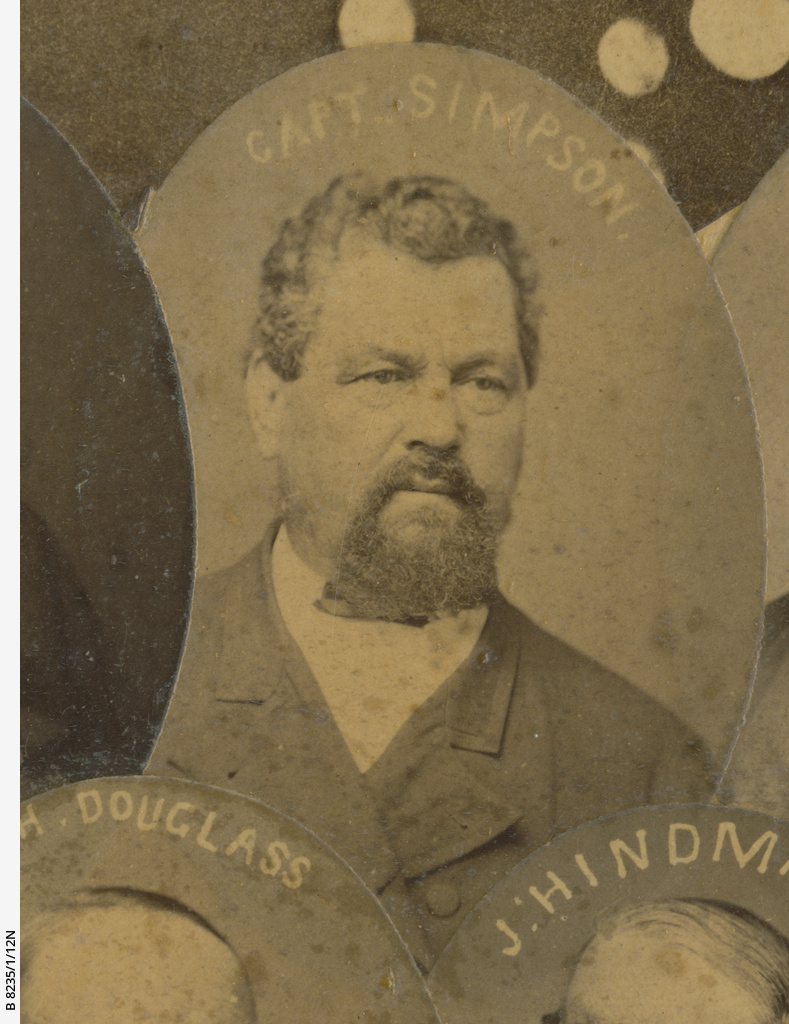
- Captain Henry Simpson
- Born: 1815; Possibly Hull
- Died: 26 April 1884 (aged 68–69)
- Occupations: Ship captain; businessman
- Known for: Owner of Black Diamond shipping line
- Spouse: Anne Liddon (died 1878)

Henry Simpson (1815 – 26 April 1884), often referred to as "Captain Simpson", was a ship's captain, ship owner and businessman in South Australia.

== History ==
Henry Simpson arrived at Kangaroo Island 1836 as second officer to Captain Martin of the 105 ton two-masted schooner John Pirie, then captain of the Orwell 1842, the South Australia Company's schooner Victoria in 1943, and by 1844 captain of the John Pirie. He was later made captain of the barque Lord Hobart. According to A. T. Saunders he was known by the nickname "Cocky".

He was appointed wharfinger at the Old Port, then transferred to the New Port.

He started acting as a shipping agent around 1850, for a time involved with millers Phillips and P. A. Horn, and with Henry Giles (partnership dissolved January 1853). He left South Australia for the goldfields of Victoria mid-1853 and when he returned two years later, having already dealt in coal from Newcastle, started in a small way as a coal merchant, anticipating the rapid increase in coal-fuelled steam power. He leased the Queen's wharf and store, and the No. 4 bond store, and founded the Black Diamond line of colliers, and by 1866 had a fleet of 14 colliers, all sailing ships. Fairfield (1864, wrecked 1874), Koh-i-noor, Julie Heyn (barque wrecked off Gerringong May 1865), Kadina (originally Jeanie B. Payne) 1865–1879, Moonta 1865, Frowning Beauty, Bosphorus (barque) 1866, Wallaroo, Meander (1866–1875), Contest (wrecked 1874), Verulam 1869, Exonia. By 1871 the Julie Heyn, Moonta and Frowning Beauty were no longer counted among their number. Lanercost, Saxon, Stag (1872), J. L. Hall, Athena, Planter (Plantea?) and Ardencraig were acquired later. Simpson was curiously slow in adopting steam power for his little fleet of ships, introducing Ridge Park in 1879, Birksgate in 1881, and Tenterden in 1883. The Tenterden was sold in 1884. The naming of these steamer was significant: "Ridge Park" was the name of Simpson's residence in Glen Osmond; "Tenterden" was for a time the family home in Woodville, later the home of his son James. "Birksgate" was a residence owned by his business partner Thomas Elder.

The Black Diamond line did more than just carry coal from Newcastle to Adelaide and Wallaroo; the Koh-i-noor brought some forty camels and their "Afghan" attendants from Karachi for Thomas Elder's Umbaratana station in 1868. The Koh-i-noor was chartered by the South Australian Government to service the Northern Territory expedition in 1869.

Simpson was no cost-cutter – he kept his ships in top condition and employed some of the smartest skippers, paying generous bonuses when fast times were achieved.

Simpson was for a time owner of the Albert Hotel, Alberton, since demolished.

The company Simpson & Sons continued after Henry's death and owned the collier Otago, remembered as being in 1887 under the command of Joseph Conrad when her master Capt. Snadden died in the Gulf of Siam.

== Recognition ==
A stained glass window in his memory, depicting the unloading of a ship, was installed in St Margaret's Church, Woodville, in 1936.

The "Black Diamond Corner" (intersection of St. Vincent Street and Commercial Road, Port Adelaide) was named for the Black Diamond Hotel, which was named for Simpson's Black Diamond shipping line. For many years at the centre of this intersection stood a white "silent cop" obelisk surmounted with a multi-faceted black glass structure.

== Family ==
He married Anne Liddon (1816 – 15 December 1878). Their children were:

- Henry Sieveright Simpson (c. 1842 – 5 August 1887) may have been the "Henry S. Simpson" sued in February 1887 by Ellen Stephenson for non-support of her illegitimate child.
- Dr. James Liddon Simpson (1844 – 28 December 1899) married Margaret Elphinstone Monteith (24 December 1853 – ) on 15 April 1875, lived at "Tenterden". She married again, to William Thow (died 9 March 1926), of Sydney, on 21 January 1901.
- Jessie Hall Simpson (1845 – 24 September 1932) married George Alexander Connor ( – 3 October 1925) on 26 July 1865. Connor worked for the Black Diamond line before joining the Port Adelaide branch of Bank of Adelaide.
- Emma Sophia Simpson (27 October 1851 – 8 September 1914) married William Milne (1849 – 14 December 1905), son of William Milne on 17 March 1870
- Alice Mary Simpson (1852 – 22 February 1923) married Joseph Sylvester O'Halloran on 17 August 1886
- William Amos Simpson (1855 – 10 November 1920)
- Lilian? Lilias? Anne "Lily" Simpson (29 March 1856 – 2 April 1910) married Leslie MacLaren ( – ) son of J. W. MacLaren of London on 22 August 1878
- Eva May Simpson (1 May 1859 – 31 July 1878) died at Ridge Park

== Another Captain Simpson ==
Captain John James Simpson (died 24 December 1911) was a son of John Simpson of Rochester, Kent. He commanded sailing vessels of Black Diamond line then Birksgate and Tenterden. He married Agnes Grierson (died 19 July 1887) on 5 May 1880. She was daughter of Captain T. Grierson of Woodville and a sister of Mrs. W. R. Cave and Mrs. W. E. Slade. It is possible he was not related to Henry Simpson.
