= John Wrightson =

British agriculturalist (1840–1916)

Professor John Wrightson in 1910

Professor John Wrightson FCS, MRAC (1840 – 30 November 1916) was a British agriculturalist and the founder of Downton Agricultural College (1880–1906) at Downton in Wiltshire. In 1890 he reputedly became the first person in Britain to surf, under the guidance of two Hawaiian princes, David Kawānanakoa and Jonah Kūhiō Kalanianaʻole, who were studying at his college.

== Early career ==
Wrightson was born in Haughton-le-Skerne in County Durham, the son of Thomas Wrightson (1800–1872) and Rebecca Gilchrist née Potter (1803–1884) and was the brother of Rebecca Ingram Head, Mary Wrightson, the Revd. William Garmondsway Wrightson and the Conservative politician Sir Thomas Wrightson. In 1863 Wrightson had been a foremost student at the Royal Agricultural College following which he was a professor of agriculture at the same college for 15 years (1864–1879). In 1868 he was initiated as a Freemason into the Cotteswold Lodge No 593. His interest in agricultural education was developed following a tour of Europe while acting as the Royal Agricultural Society's representative at the Vienna International Exposition of 1873; he was probably the first to introduce grass silage to Britain (or "sour hay", as he called it). It was Wrightson's view that agricultural education necessitated practical hands-on skills to be developed along with the scientific, and to that end he made good use of the 535 acres he had at Charford Manor, where he also lived and brought up his 11 children, at the same time stating, in a dig against other similar but less-endowed colleges, that "a sufficient farm is essential to an institution which pretends to teach farming."

== Downton Agricultural College ==
Wrightson with his students at Downton Agricultural College (1881)

On leaving the Royal Agricultural College in 1879, Wrightson took a small number of important lecturing staff with him, including William Fream, In early 1880 they founded the private Downton Agricultural College at Charford Manor in Wiltshire, the third agricultural college in England, which for a short period was called the Wiltshire and Hampshire Agricultural College. Here they experimented with growing flax and sorghum and with soil chemistry; the discovery of the agricultural value of basic slag (a high phosphate black powdered product used to "sweeten" soil to produce forage with high sugars and high nutritional value) is attributed to the college. Among the college's students were Vernon Hamersley, the Australian politician. Under Wrightson's direction, Downton gained a reputation similar to that of the Royal Agricultural College and, like the Royal and Aspatria Agricultural College, it was exempt from the Royal Institution of Chartered Surveyors' land agency examinations. The college held an important flock of Hampshire Down sheep.

In June 1884, railway carriages were derailed near the college, killing four people and injuring another 41. Wrightson, together with his staff and students, rushed to the scene of the accident to assist the injured and dying and were later awarded a silver cup for their efforts. In September 1890, at Bridlington, under the guidance of two expatriate Hawaiian princes, Princes David Kawānanakoa and Jonah Kūhiō Kalanianaʻole, who were studying at Downton, Wrightson donned woolly bathers and reputedly became the first British surfer. In January 1891, a fire destroyed much of the building complex at Downton College, including Wrightson's home as well as the collection of botanical, zoological and geological specimens collected over many years by Professor Ernest Clarke, a member of the academic staff. A firm believer in education for all, Wrightson was very involved in the life of Downton village and taught children at the local state school.

Wrightson in 1906

In 1906, as Wrightson approached retirement age, Downton closed – its troubles exacerbated by the fact that private fee-charging colleges were becoming increasingly less attractive with the development of publicly funded agricultural education. Wrightson left Downton in 1911 to concentrate on his writing and research. However, in retirement, Wrightson still took in several students each year and continued to write prolifically; his publications include the widely read Agriculture, Theoretical and Practical: A Textbook of Mixed Farming for Large and Small Farmers and for Agricultural Students (co-authored with John Newsham in 1915); Sheep Breeds and Management, Vinton & Company, Ltd, London (1895); and Agricultural Text-Book Embracing Soils, Manures, Rotations of Crops and Live Stock, William Collins, Sons & Co., Ltd., London and Glasgow (c.1900).

On Wrightson's death at Marylebone in London in 1916, aged 76, the principal of the Royal Agricultural College, J. R. Ainsworth-Davis, wrote that Wrightson "... would always occupy an honoured place in the history of British agriculture, especially as regards the educational developments."

Wrightson's grave in Brookwood Cemetery in 2019

His obituary in Nature stated:

THE death of Prof. John Wrightson, on November 30, at seventy-six years of age, removes a well-known authority and writer from the agricultural world. As professor of agriculture (1864–79) at the Royal Agricultural College, Cirencester, he formed one of a small but eminent group of teachers, including Church and Fream, who have left a lasting mark on their subject. After his departure from Cirencester he founded Downton College, of which he was president until it closed in 1906 from inability to compete with State-aided institutions. Many of his former pupils, both at Cirencester and Downton, have done much to promote the improvement of agriculture. For some years Wrightson was professor of agriculture and agricultural chemistry at the Royal College of Science, and chief examiner to the Science and Art Department in the "Principles of Agriculture."

== Personal life ==
Wrightson married Maria Isabella Hulton (1850–1923) in 1872 and was the father of Rebecca Elena Harrison (1873–1937); John Frederick Hulton Wrightson (1875–1944); Alyne Garmondsway Denton (born 1876); Thomas Reginald Wrightson (1878–1928); Act. Lieut.-Cdr Edmund Gilchrist Wrightson, DSO, RNR (1879–1953); Hilda Wrightson (1881–1961); Archibald Ingram Hulton Wrightson (1882–1953); Georgiana Maria Hulton Wrightson (1884–1956); Roger Armstrong Wrightson (1888–1959); Philip Blethyn Hulton Wrightson (1890–1958), and Cerdic William Wrightson (1892–1977). Julian Fellowes, the writer and director of the television series Downton Abbey, is Wrightson's great-grandson.

Wrightson died in 1916 at 29 Wimpole Street in Marylebone in London and was buried in Brookwood Cemetery in Surrey. In his will he left £18,072 14s to his widow. The National Portrait Gallery in London holds five photographic portraits of Wrightson in its collection.
