= Arthur Aikin Brodribb =

British reporter (1850–1927)

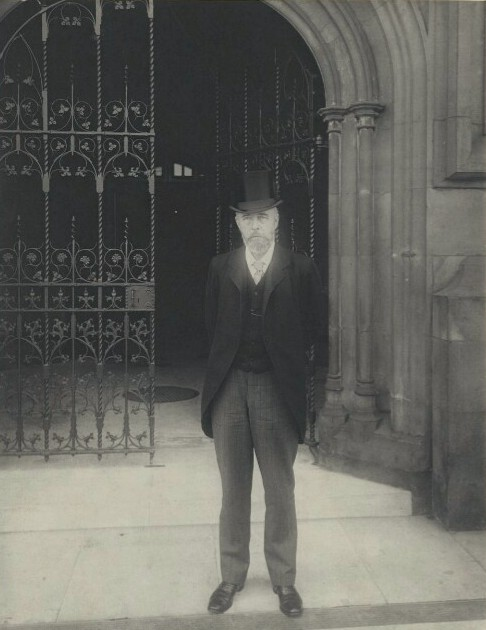
Arthur Aikin Brodribb photographed by John Benjamin Stone in 1898

Arthur Aikin Brodribb (27 July 27, 1850, in London – April 1927) was a parliamentary reporter for The Times.

He was educated at King's College School and moved on to King's College, London where he was taught by the journalist-cum-scholar John Sherren Brewer and John Lonsdale. From here he then went on to Exeter College, Oxford, whence he graduated in 1873.

He joined The Times in April, 1877, as a member of the Parliamentary staff while John Thadeus Delane was editor of the newspaper.

== Works ==
- A Roman Reporter, (1893) London: Society for Promoting Christian Knowledge: historical fiction set in 308 A. D.
