= William Samuel Lilly =

English barrister and man of letters

W. S. Lilly
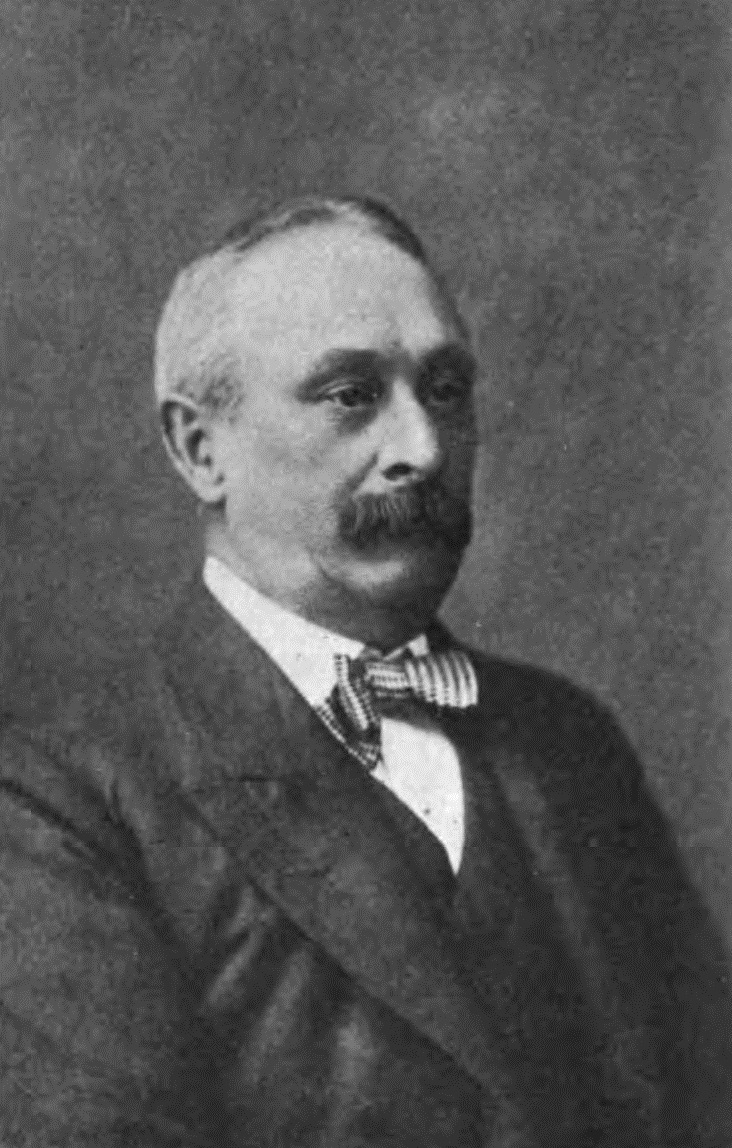
- William Samuel Lilly picture
- Born: William Samuel Lilly; 10 July 1840; Dorset, England
- Died: 29 August 1919 (aged 79); West Kensington, London
- Occupations: Historian, jurist
- Spouse: Anna Marie Lilly

William Samuel Lilly (10 July 1840 – 29 August 1919) was an English barrister and man of letters.

== Biography ==
Lilly was born at Fifehead, Dorset, in 1840. He was educated at Peterhouse, Cambridge, taking his degree of LL.B. in 1862, and his LL.M. in 1870. After some private tuition from Sir Adolphus William Ward, he entered the Indian civil service, becoming in 1869 secretary to the government of Madras. Owing to a breakdown in health, however, he had to return to England, where he devoted himself to a career in literature. With his wide-ranging intellectual interests, Lilly occasionally wrote for some of the major publications of his time, such as The Nineteenth Century, The Contemporary Review, The Fortnightly Review, Popular Science Monthly, and The Dublin Review.

Lilly was a convert to Roman Catholicism, and from 1874 was secretary to the Catholic Union of Great Britain. He was also a Justice of the Peace for Middlesex and London.

== Works ==
- Ancient Religion and Modern Thought (1884).
- Chapters in European History (2 vols., 1886).
- A Century of Revolution (1890).
- On Right and Wrong (1890).
- On Shibboleths (1892).
- The Great Enigma (1892).
- Manual of the Law Specially Affecting Catholics (1893, with John E.P. Wallis).
- The Claims of Christianity (1894).
- Four English Humourists of the Nineteenth Century (1895).
- Essays and Speeches (1897).
- First Principles in Politics (1899).
- Renaissance Types (1901).
- India and its Problems (1902).
- Christianity and Modern Civilization (1903).
- Studies in Religion and Literature (1904).
- Many Mansions: Studies in Ancient Religion and Modern Thought (1907).
- Idola Fori (1910).
- The New France (1913).
- An Invisible Kingdom (1919).

Selected articles

- "The Study of Medieval History," The Dublin Review, Vol. LXXX (1877).
- "The True View of the Protestant Reformation," The Dublin Review, Vol. LXXXI (1877).
- "The Renaissance and Liberty," The Dublin Review, Vol. LXXXII (1878).
- "Archbishop Trench on Medieval Church History," The Dublin Review, Vol. LXXXII (1878).
- "Michael Angelo and his Age," The Quarterly Review, Vol. CXLVII (1879).
- "Cardinal Newman," The Fortnightly Review, Vol. XXXII (1879).
- "The Eighteenth Century," The Dublin Review, Vol. LXXXIV (1879).
- "The Eighteenth Century, II," The Dublin Review, Vol. LXXXV (1879).
- "The Age of Balzac," The Contemporary Review, Vol. XXXVII (1880).
- "The Eighteenth Century, III," The Dublin Review, Vol. LXXXVI (1880).
- "The Eighteenth Century, IV," The Dublin Review, Vol. LXXXIX (1881).
- "The Principles of '89," The Contemporary Review, Vol. XXXIX (1881).
- "The Goal of Modern Thought," The Nineteenth Century, Vol. XI, 1882.
- "The Sacred Books of the East," The Dublin Review, Vol. XCI (1882).
- "The Resurrection of Ireland," The Dublin Review, Vol. XCI (1882).
- "Free-thought—French and English," The Contemporary Review, Vol. XLI (1882).
- "Supernaturalism: Mediæval and Classical," The Nineteenth Century, Vol. XIV (1883).
- "The Saints of Islam," The Contemporary Review, Vol. XLIV (1883).
- "The Experiment of France," The Dublin Review, Vol. XCIV (1884).
- "The Christian Revolution," The Contemporary Review, Vol. XLV (1884).
- "Modern Mysticism," The Fortnightly Review, Vol. XLII (1884).
- "What Can History Teach Us?," The Contemporary Review, Vol. XLVIII (1885).
- "The New Naturalism," The Fortnightly Review, Vol. XLIV (1885).
- "Darwinism and Democracy," The Fortnightly Review, Vol. XLV (1886).
- "Liberty and Liberalism," The Fortnightly Review, Vol. XLV (1886).
- "Pro Vivis et Defunctis: Some Remarks Upon Father Amherst's History of Catholic Emancipation," The Dublin Review, Vol. XCIX (1886).
- "The Present Outlook for Christianity," The Forum, Vol. II (1886)
- "Materialism and Morality," The Fortnightly Review, Vol. XLVI (1886).
- "Mr. John Morley," The Dublin Review, Vol. C (1887).
- "The Constitution of 1782," The Dublin Review, Vol. C (1887).
- "What is the Object of Life?," The Forum, Vol. IV (1887).
- "The Province of Physics: A Rejoinder to Professor Huxley," The Fortnightly Review, Vol. XLVII (1887).
- "The Higher Theism," The Fortnightly Review, Vol. XLVIII (1887).
- "Catholics and County Councils," The Dublin Review, Vol. CIII (1888).
- "Right and Wrong," The Fortnightly Review, Vol. XLIX (1888).
- "What is Left of Christianity?," The Nineteenth Century, Vol. XXIV (1888).
- "Herbert Spencer as a Moralist," The Fortnightly Review, Vol. XLIX (1888).
- "Collins Epitome of Herbert Spencer," The Nineteenth Century, Vol. XXVII (1888).
- "Professor Green," The Dublin Review, Vol. CV (1889).
- "The Foundation of Ethics," The Forum, Vol. VI (1889).
- "The Ethics of Art," The Forum, Vol. VII (1889).
- "The Ethics of Politics," The Forum, Vol. VII (1889).
- "The Ethics of Journalism," The Forum, Vol. VII (1889).
- "The Ethics of Marriage," The Forum, Vol. VIII (1889).
- "The Ethics of Property," The Forum, Vol. VIII (1889).
- "The Ethics of Punishment," The Fortnightly Review, Vol. LII (1889).
- "Sophocles in English," The Nineteenth Century, Vol. XXV (1889).
- "In Search of a Religion," The Nineteenth Century, Vol. XXVI (1889).
- "Our Great Philosopher," The Contemporary Review, Vol. LV (1889).
- "Our Great Philosopher, II" The Contemporary Review, Vol. LVI (1889).
- "John Henry Newman: In Memoriam," The Fortnightly Review, Vol. LIV (1890).
- "The Shibboleth of Public Opinion," The Forum, Vol. X (1890).
- "The Shibboleth of Liberty," The Forum, Vol. X (1891).
- "The Shibboleth of 'the People'," The Forum, Vol. XI (1891).
- "The Jacobin Movement in Ireland," The Dublin Review, Vol. CVIII (1891).
- "The Penal Laws: An Historical Retrospect," The Dublin Review, Vol. CIX (1891).
- "The Indictment of Dives," The New Review, Vol. IX (1893).
- "Self-Government," The Fortnightly Review, Vol. LX (1893).
- "The Philosophy of Crime," The Contemporary Review, Vol. LXV (1894).
- "Alexander Pope," The Dublin Review, Vol. CXIV (1894).
- "The New Spirit in History," The Nineteenth Century, Vol. XXXVIII (1895).
- "The Mission of Tennyson," The Fortnightly Review, Vol. XXXVIII (1897).
- "An Object Lesson in Politics," The Fortnightly Review, Vol. LXVIII (1897).
- "Mr. Wilfrid Ward's Cardinal Wiseman," The Fortnightly Review, Vol. LXIX (1898).
- "The Methods of the Inquisition," The Nineteenth Century, Vol. XLIII (1898).
- "What Was Primitive Christianity?," The Nineteenth Century, Vol. XLIV (1898).
- "The 'Parlous Position' of England," The Nineteenth Century, Vol. XLVII (1900).
- "Anglicanism: Old and New," The Dublin Review, Vol. CXXXVIII, 1906.
- "The Coming Eucharistic Congress," The Dublin Review, Vol. CXLIII, 1908.
- "The End of a Legend," The Nineteenth Century and After, Vol. LXV (1909).
- "The Question of the House of Lords," The Nineteenth Century and After, Vol. LXVIII (1910).
- "The Philosophy of Strikes," The Nineteenth Century and After, Vol. LXX (1911).
- "Lord Acton and the French Revolution," The Dublin Review, Vol. CXLVIII (1911).
- "Some Modern Martyrs," The Dublin Review, Vol. CXLIX (1911).
- "Substitutes for Christianity," The Fortnightly Review, Vol. XCVII (1912).
- "The Rule of Funk," The Nineteenth Century and After, Vol. LXXI (1912).
- "Criminals and the Criminal Class," The Nineteenth Century and After, Vol. LXXII (1912).
- "A Vanishing Virtue," The Nineteenth Century and After, Vol. LXXVI (1914).

Miscellany

- Characteristics from the Writings of John Henry Newman (1874).
