= Sylvester O'Halloran =

Irish surgeon

Dr. Sylvester O'Halloran

Sylvester O'Halloran (31 December 1728 – 11 August 1807) was an Irish surgeon with an abiding interest in Gaelic poetry and history. For most of his life he lived and practised in Limerick, and was later elected a member of the Royal Irish Academy (RIA).

== Early life ==
O'Halloran was the third son of Michael O'Halloran, a prosperous farmer at Caherdavin, County Limerick, and his wife Mary McDonnell. He was named after Sylvester Lloyd, the titular Catholic bishop of Killaloe in 1728–39. His mother's cousin Sean Claragh McDonnell taught him much at an early age, including some Greek and Latin. He went on to a Limerick school run by Robert Cashin, a Protestant clergyman, which was unusual at the time as the O'Hallorans were Roman Catholics during the difficult time of the Penal Laws.

Sylvester and his brothers engaged successfully in areas of life that worked around the restrictions of the Penal Laws. Joseph became a Jesuit and held chairs in rhetoric, philosophy and divinity at the Jesuit College at Bordeaux in France. George became a jeweller and in time a property-owner. Sylvester went to London to learn medicine at the age of 17, particularly studying the methods of Richard Mead, as well as the oculists Taylor and Hillmer. After further study at Leyden, and in Paris under the anatomist and academician Antoine Ferrein, he set up practice as a surgeon in Limerick in early 1749.

== Career as surgeon ==
O'Halloran wrote several learned treatises on medical matters, and his fame was acknowledged by his membership of the RIA in 1787. He was a founder of the County Limerick Infirmary that started with 4 beds in 1761 before moving to larger premises at St Francis's Abbey in 1765. The foundation stone of the original infirmary is now preserved in the Sylvester O'Halloran Post Graduate Centre at the University Hospital, Limerick.

While in France, he had been very impressed with the Académie Royale de Chirurgie, which had been founded in Paris in 1731 during the reign of Louis XV. He was subsequently instrumental in founding the Royal College of Surgeons in Ireland (RCSI), by writing its blueprint, the Proposals for the Advancement of Surgery in Ireland in 1765. In 1780, he was made an honorary member of the new "Dublin Society of Surgeons", and when the RCSI received its charter in 1784 he was again elected an honorary member, equivalent to a Fellowship today.

=== Medical bibliography ===
- A New Philosophical and Medical Treatise on the Air (manuscript; before 1750).
- A Treatise on the Glaucoma, or Cataract (Dublin, 1750).
- A New Method of Amputation (1763).
- Gangrene and Sphacelus (1765).
- A New Treatise on the Different Disorders arising from External Injuries to the Head (1793).

In his last work O'Halloran contributes to Irish social history, as the head injuries he treated were often caused by fights aggravated by alcohol abuse. On page 4 he commented:

"...for our people, invincibly brave, notwithstanding the cruel oppressions they have suffered for a century past, and highly irritable, soon catch fire; a slight offence is frequently followed by serious consequences; and sticks, stones, and every species of offence next to hand, are dealt out with great liberality! To this add the frequent abuse of spirituous liquors, particularly whiskey, which has, unhappily for the morals and constitutions of the people, found its way to every part of the kingdom."

== Student of Gaelic poetry ==
As well as his scientific knowledge, O'Halloran's interest in the arts began with his collection of Gaelic poetry manuscripts and this led on to an interest in Irish history. Given his background, he argued to validate the pre-Norman history of Ireland which had often been dismissed as a period of barbarism.

His correspondents included Edmund Burke on early history. With Charles O'Conor of Belanagare he discussed Macpherson's translated version of Ossian, and advised him about an eye complaint.

In 1789 Charlotte Brooke published the first English-language compendium of Irish poetry, the seminal "Reliques of Irish Poetry", giving full due to O'Halloran for lending her his manuscript collection and for having written the essential history underlying her anthology.

=== Critics ===
As an early sympathetic historian of the Gaelic world in English, O'Halloran has faced criticism for being too sympathetic. In the 1770s, a critic suggested he should:

drop any more scribbling, and mind the Systole and Diastole of the human body, which I suppose you are more acquainted with than history.

The historian J. C. Beckett (1912–96) included O'Halloran among those aiming: to vindicate its claims by uncritical admiration for the achievements of pre-Norman Ireland.

=== Historical bibliography ===
- An introduction to the study of the Antiquities of Ireland (1772)
- Ierne Defended (1774)
- A general history of Ireland (1778)

== Family life ==
In 1752 Sylvester married Mary Casey and they had four sons and a daughter. Their homes were in Change Lane and then on Merchants' Quay; Mary died in 1782. O'Halloran was buried in 1807 at St. Munchin's graveyard, at Killeely which is now a suburb of Limerick. One of their sons was Major-General Sir Joseph O'Halloran, the father of Thomas O'Halloran, after whom the Adelaide suburb of O'Halloran Hill was named.

== Limerick public life ==
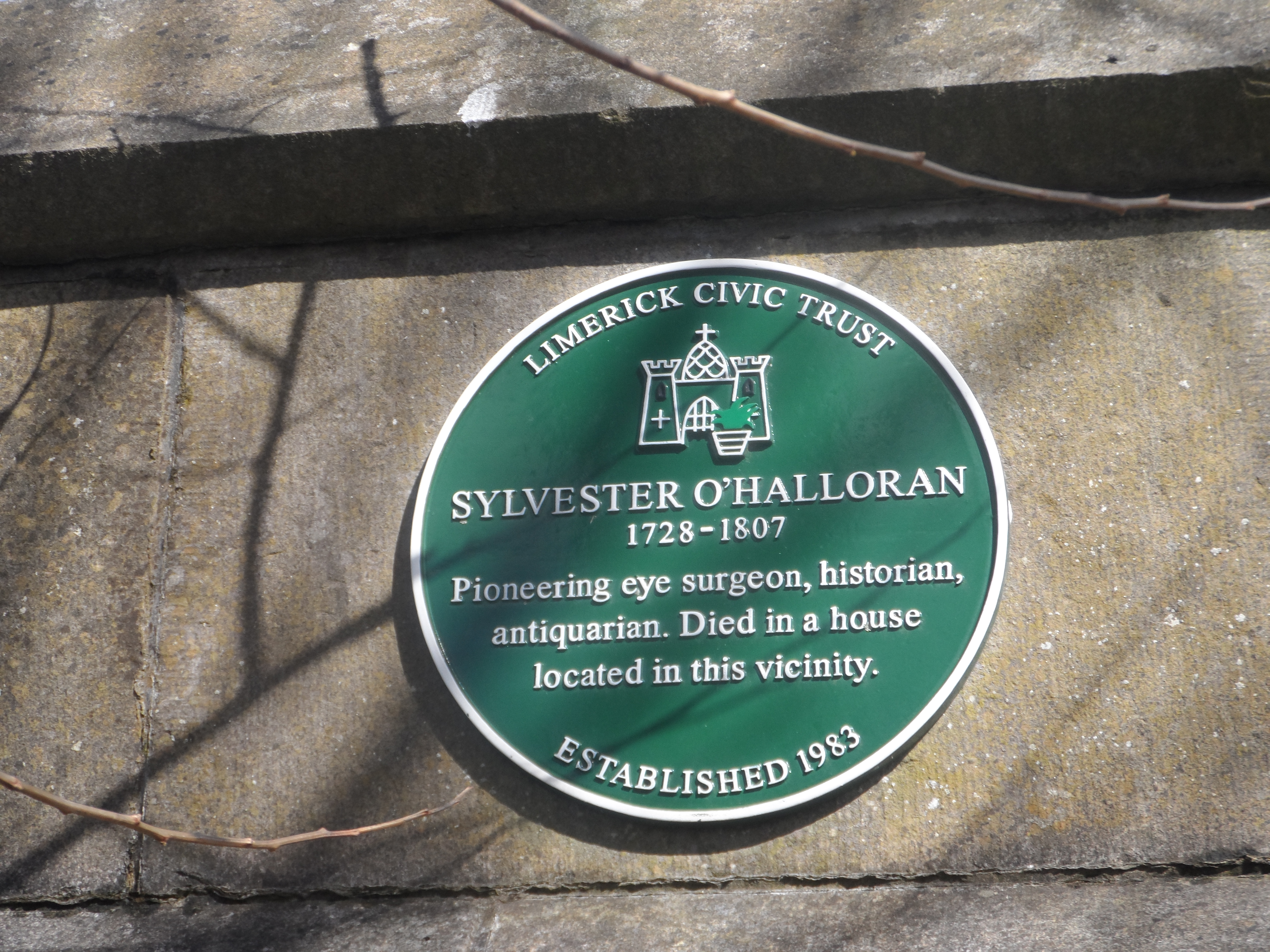
Plaque near O'Halloran's place of death.

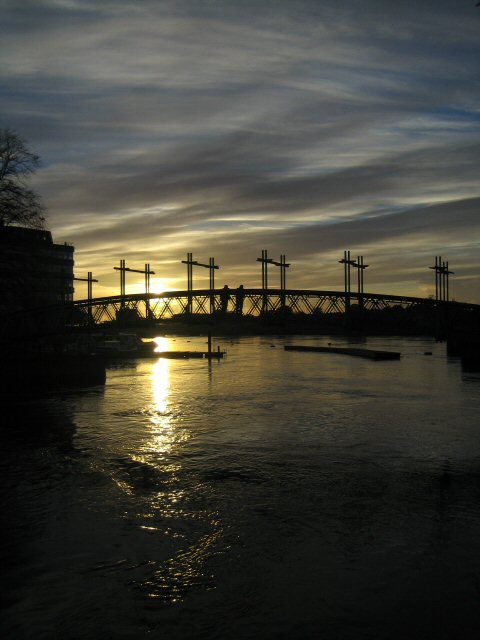
Sylvester O'Halloran Bridge, Limerick

Though politically restricted in his life by the Penal Laws, O'Halloran helped establish the county Infirmary (see above), was elected President of the city's Free Debating Society in 1772 and was elected to a committee in 1783 that examined the Shannon navigation. Appropriately, a Limerick bridge over the Shannon has been named after him.
