= Norman MacColl =

British man of letters; editor of the Athenæum

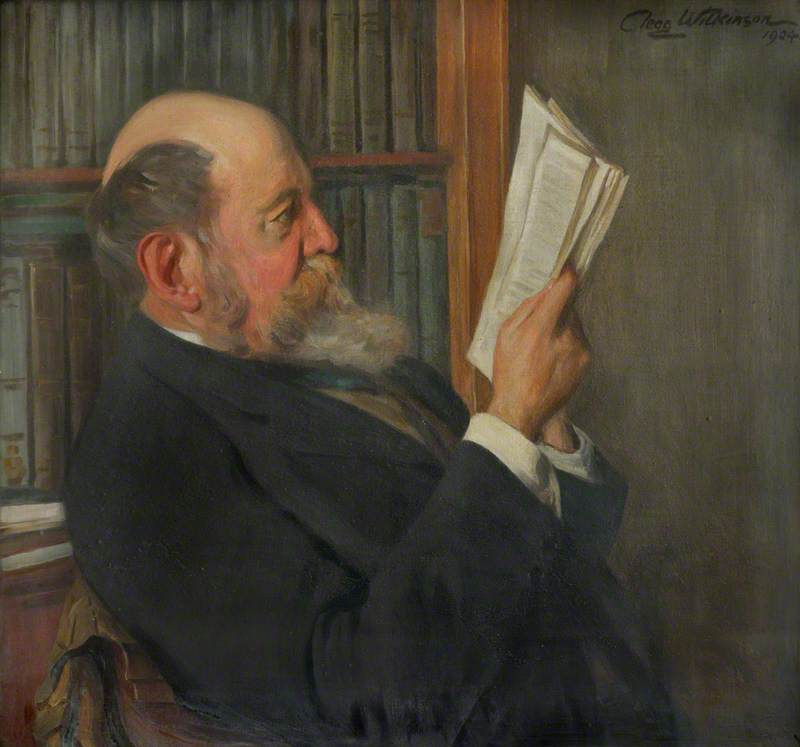
Norman MacColl

Norman MacColl (21 August 1843 – 16 December 1904) was a Scottish man of letters, known as a Hispanist and editor of the Athenæum.

== Life ==
Born on 31 August 1843 at 28 Ann Street, Edinburgh, he was the only child of Alexander Stewart MacColl and his wife Eliza Fulford of Crediton. His father was a classicist and kept a school in Edinburgh; he was brought up at home with his first cousin, Alice Gaunter, who married James R. Jackson.

MacColl entered Christ's College, Cambridge, in 1862, but migrated next year to Downing College, and was elected a scholar there in 1865. His coach Richard Shilleto encouraged outside reading, and he took a second class in the classical tripos of 1866. In 1869, he was elected a fellow of Downing, having won the Hare Prize in 1868. He graduated B.A. in 1866 and proceeded M.A. in 1869. He became a student of Lincoln's Inn on 21 January 1872, and was called to the bar on 17 November 1875.

At Cambridge, MacColl began an acquaintance with Sir Charles Dilke, proprietor of the Athenæum, and in 1871 Dilke appointed him editor of the magazine. He was in post up to the end of 1900, working without an assistant until 1896. As editor, he watched the style of contributors, and they could be corrected in published correspondence. His replacement in 1900 as editor was his assistant, Vernon Horace Rendall (1869–1960).

MacColl ventured into society comparatively little, but occasionally visited Westland Marston's Sunday parties. He went in later life to the Athenæum Club, was one of Leslie Stephen's "Sunday Tramps", and played golf. He travelled on the Continent in his vacations, making one Spanish tour.

MacColl died unmarried, suddenly at his residence, 4 Campden Hill Square, Kensington, on 16 December 1904, from heart failure. He was buried at Charlton cemetery, Blackheath, in the same grave with his parents.

== Works ==
MacColl concentrated on the study of Spanish from 1874. He published translations:

- Select Plays of Calderon (1888).
- Cervantes, Exemplary Novels (Glasgow, 2 vols., 1902), in the collection edited by James Fitzmaurice-Kelly.

His Hare Prize essay, Greek Sceptics from Pyrrho to Sextus, was published.

== Norman MacColl lectures ==
MacColl endowed by will a named lectureship at Cambridge in Spanish and Portuguese, and left his Spanish books to the Cambridge University Library. The first Norman MacColl lecturer was James Fitzmaurice-Kelly, in 1908. Initially the lectures occurred every four years, and Fitz-Maurice Kelly was appointed again in 1912.

== Notes ==
Attribution

This article incorporates text from a publication now in the public domain: Lee, Sidney, ed. (1912). "MacColl, Norman". Dictionary of National Biography (2nd supplement). Vol. 2. London: Smith, Elder & Co.
