= Dictionary of National Biography =

Reference on notable British figures

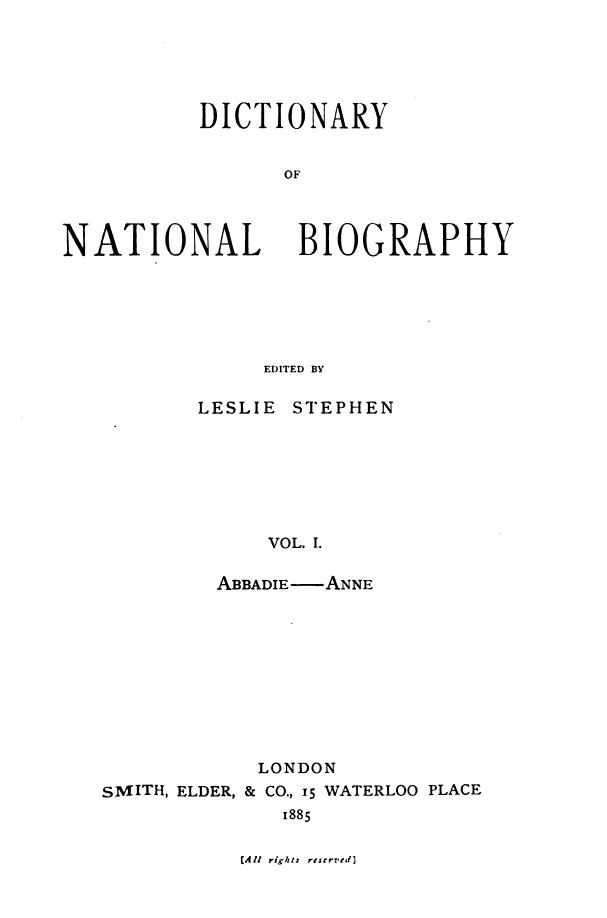
Title page of the first volume of the Dictionary of National Biography (1885)

The Dictionary of National Biography (DNB) is a standard work of reference on notable deceased figures from British history, published since 1885. The updated Oxford Dictionary of National Biography (ODNB) was published on 23 September 2004 in 60 volumes and online, with 50,113 biographical articles covering 54,922 lives.

== First series ==
Hoping to emulate national biographical collections published elsewhere in Europe, such as the Allgemeine Deutsche Biographie (1875), in 1882 the publisher George Smith (1824–1901), of Smith, Elder & Co., planned a universal dictionary that would include biographical entries on individuals from world history. He approached Leslie Stephen, then editor of the Cornhill Magazine, owned by Smith, to become the editor. Stephen persuaded Smith that the work should focus only on subjects from the United Kingdom and its present and former colonies. An early working title was the Biographia Britannica, the name of an earlier eighteenth-century reference work.

The first volume of the Dictionary of National Biography appeared on 1 January 1885. In May 1891 Leslie Stephen resigned and Sidney Lee, Stephen's assistant editor from the beginning of the project, succeeded him as editor. A dedicated team of sub-editors and researchers worked under Stephen and Lee, combining a variety of talents from veteran journalists to young scholars who cut their academic teeth on dictionary articles at a time when postgraduate historical research in British universities was still in its infancy. While much of the dictionary was written in-house, the DNB also relied on external contributors, who included several respected writers and scholars of the late nineteenth century. By 1900, more than 700 individuals had contributed to the work. Successive volumes appeared quarterly with complete punctuality until midsummer 1900, when the series closed with volume 63. The year of publication, the editor and the range of names in each volume is given below.

== Supplements and revisions ==
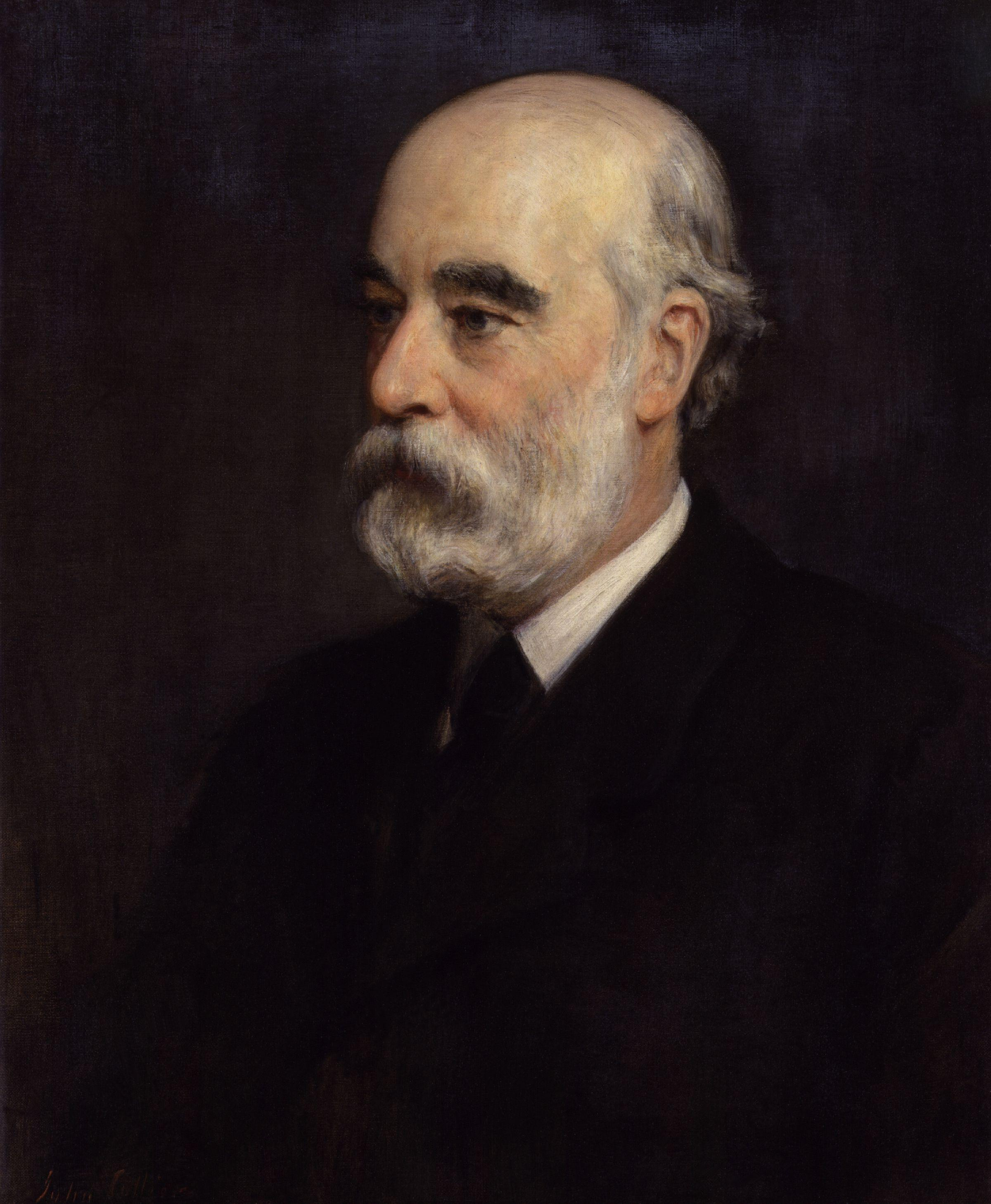
George Murray Smith conceived of the DNB, subsidized it, and saw it finally into print before he died in 1901.

Since the scope included only deceased figures, the DNB was soon extended by the issue of three supplementary volumes, covering subjects who had died between 1885 and 1900 or who had been overlooked in the original alphabetical sequence. The supplements brought the whole work up to the death of Queen Victoria on 22 January 1901. Corrections were added.

After issuing a volume of errata in 1904, the dictionary was reissued with minor revisions in 22 volumes in 1908 and 1909; a subtitle said that it covered British history "from the earliest times to the year 1900". In the words of the Encyclopædia Britannica Eleventh Edition, the dictionary had "proved of inestimable service in elucidating the private annals of the British", providing not only concise lives of the notable deceased, but additionally lists of sources which were invaluable to researchers in a period when few libraries or collections of manuscripts had published catalogues or indices, and the production of indices to periodical literatures was just beginning. Throughout the twentieth century, further volumes were published for those who had died, generally on a decade-by-decade basis, beginning in 1912 with a supplement edited by Lee covering those who died between 1901 and 1911. The dictionary was transferred from its original publishers, Smith, Elder & Co., to Oxford University Press in 1917. Until 1996, Oxford University Press continued to add further supplements featuring articles on subjects who had died during the twentieth century. These include the 3rd supplement in 1927 (covering those who died between 1912 and 1921), 4th supplement in 1937 (covering those who died between 1922 and 1930), 5th supplement in 1949 (covering those who died between 1931 and 1940), 6th supplement in 1959 (covering those who died between 1941 and 1950), 7th supplement in 1971 (covering those who died between 1951 and 1960), 8th supplement in 1981 (covering those who died between 1961 and 1970), 9th supplement in 1986 (covering those who died between 1971 and 1980), 10th supplement in 1990 (covering those who died between 1981 and 1985), 11th supplement in 1993 (covering missing persons, see below), and 12th supplement in 1996 (covering those who died between 1986 and 1990).

The 63 volumes of the original DNB included 29,120 lives; the supplements published between 1912 and 1996 added about 6,000 lives of people who died in the twentieth century. In 1993, a volume containing missing biographies was published. This had an additional 1,086 lives, selected from over 100,000 suggestions.

L. G. L. Legg was editor of the DNB in the 1940s.

In 1966, the University of London published a volume of corrections, cumulated from the Bulletin of the Institute of Historical Research.

== Concise dictionary ==
There were various versions of the Concise Dictionary of National Biography, which covered everyone in the main work but with much shorter articles; some were only two lines. The last edition, in three volumes, covered everyone who died before 1986.

== Oxford Dictionary of National Biography ==
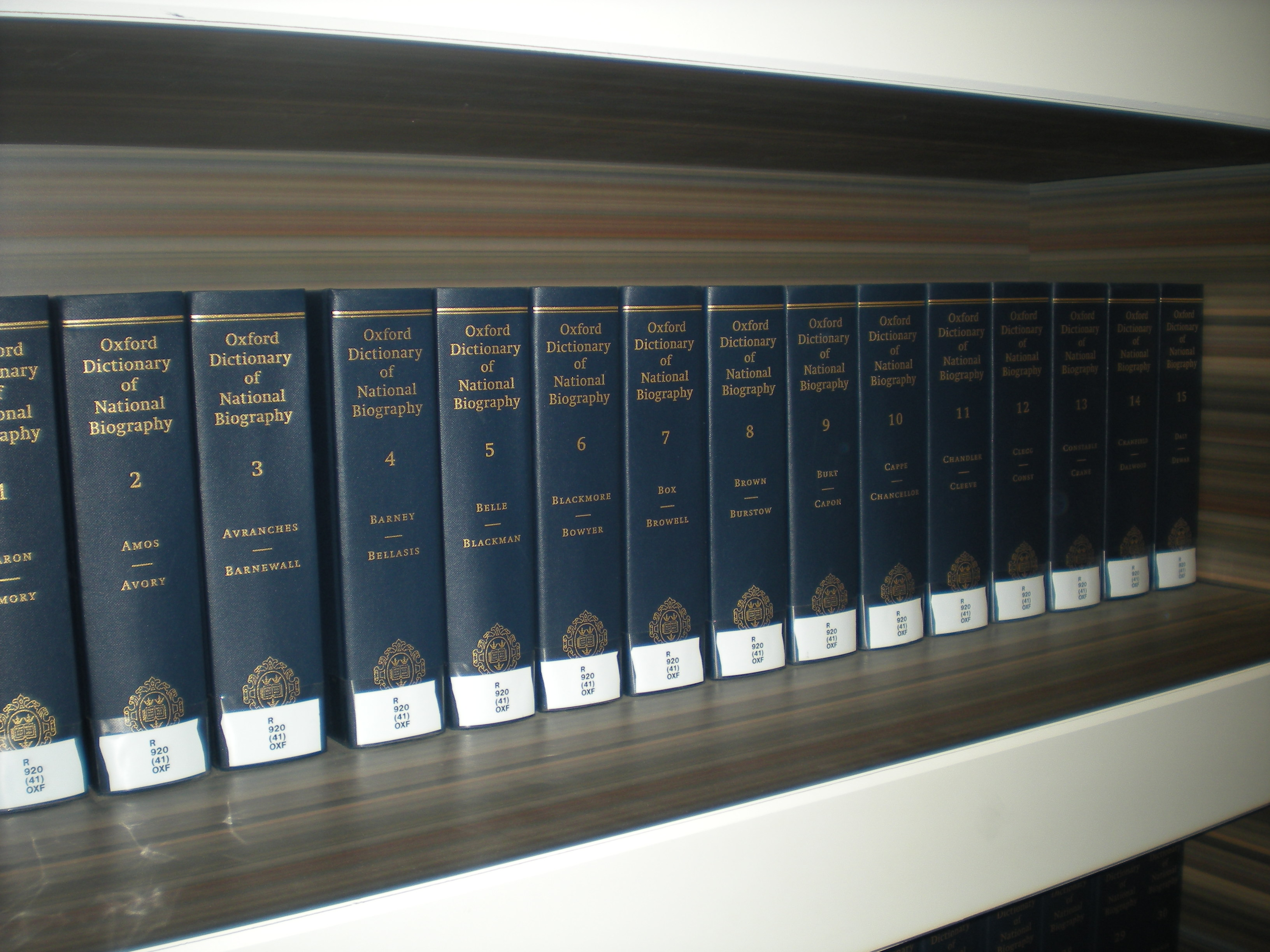
Some volumes of the Oxford Dictionary of National Biography

In the early 1990s, Oxford University Press committed itself to overhauling the DNB. Work on what was known until 2001 as the New Dictionary of National Biography, or New DNB, began in 1992 under the editorship of Colin Matthew, professor of modern history at the University of Oxford. Matthew decided that no subjects from the old dictionary would be excluded, however insignificant the subjects appeared to a late twentieth-century eye; that a minority of shorter articles from the original dictionary would remain in the new version in revised form, but most would be rewritten; and that room would be made for about 14,000 new subjects. Suggestions for new subjects were solicited through questionnaires placed in libraries and universities and, as the 1990s advanced, online. The suggestions were assessed by the editor, the 12 external consultant editors, and several hundred associate editors and in-house staff. Digitization of the DNB was performed by the Alliance Photosetting Company in Pondicherry, India.

The new dictionary would cover British history, "broadly defined" (including, for example, subjects from Roman Britain, the United States of America before its independence, and from Britain's former colonies, provided they were functionally part of the Empire and not of "the indigenous culture", as stated in the Introduction), up to 31 December 2000. The research project was conceived as a collaborative one, with in-house staff co-ordinating the work of nearly 10,000 contributors internationally. It would remain selective – there would be no attempt to include all members of parliament, for example – but would seek to include significant, influential or notorious figures from the whole canvas of the life of the United Kingdom and its former colonies, overlaying the decisions of the late-nineteenth-century editors with the interests of late-twentieth-century scholarship in the hope that "the two epochs in collaboration might produce something more useful for the future than either epoch on its own", but acknowledging also that a final definitive selection is impossible to achieve.

Matthew's dedication to a digitized ODNB included what Christopher Warren calls Matthew's "data internationalism". In a 1996 essay, Matthew prophesied, "Who can doubt that in the course of the next century, as nationality in Europe gives way to European Union, so national reference works, at least in Europe, will do so also....Just as the computer is collapsing national library catalogues in a single world-wide series, so I am sure that in the course of the next fifty years we will see the gradual aggregation of our various dictionaries of national biography. We will be much blamed by our users if we do not!"

Following Matthew's death in October 1999, he was succeeded as editor by another Oxford historian, Brian Harrison, in January 2000. The new dictionary, now known as the Oxford Dictionary of National Biography (or ODNB), was published on 23 September 2004 in 60 volumes in print at a price of £7,500, and in an online edition for subscribers. Most UK holders of a current library card can access it online free of charge. In subsequent years, the print edition has been obtainable new for a much lower price. At publication, the 2004 edition had 50,113 biographical articles covering 54,922 lives, including entries on all subjects included in the old DNB (the old DNB entries on these subjects may be accessed separately through a link to the "DNB Archive" – many of the longer entries are still highly regarded). A small permanent staff remain in Oxford to update and extend the coverage of the online edition. Harrison was succeeded as editor by another Oxford historian, Lawrence Goldman, in October 2004. The first online update was published on 4 January 2005, including subjects who had died in 2001. A further update, including subjects from all periods, followed on 23 May 2005, and another on 6 October 2005. New subjects who died in 2002 were added to the online dictionary on 5 January 2006, with continuing releases in May and October in subsequent years following the precedent of 2005. The ODNB also includes some new biographies on people who died before the DNB was published and are not included in the original DNB, because they have become notable since the DNB was published through the work of more recent historians, for example William Eyre (fl. 1634–1675).

The online version has an advanced search facility, allowing a search for people by area of interest, religion and "Places, Dates, Life Events". This accesses an electronic index that cannot be directly viewed.

Response to the new dictionary has been for the most part positive, but in the months following publication there was occasional criticism of the dictionary in some British newspapers and periodicals for reported factual inaccuracies. However, the number of articles publicly queried in this way was small – only 23 of the 50,113 articles published in September 2004, leading to fewer than 100 substantiated factual amendments. These and other queries received since publication are being considered as part of an ongoing programme of assessing proposed corrections or additions to existing subject articles, which can, when approved, be incorporated into the online edition of the dictionary. In 2005, The American Library Association awarded the Oxford Dictionary of National Biography its prestigious Dartmouth Medal. A general review of the dictionary was published in 2007.

Sir David Cannadine took over the editorship from October 2014. William Whyte will succeed Cannadine as general editor from August 2026.

== First series contents ==
Contents of each volume of the first series with year of publication and editor.
Volume	Names	Year published	Editor
1	Abbadie – Anne	1885	Stephen
2	Annesley – Baird	1885	Stephen
3	Baker – Beadon	1885	Stephen
4	Beal – Biber	1885	Stephen
5	Bicheno – Bottisham	1886	Stephen
6	Bottomley – Browell	1886	Stephen
7	Brown – Burthogge	1886	Stephen
8	Burton – Cantwell	1886	Stephen
9	Canute – Chaloner	1887	Stephen
10	Chamber – Clarkson	1887	Stephen
11	Clater – Condell	1887	Stephen
12	Conder – Craigie	1887	Stephen
13	Craik – Damer	1888	Stephen
14	Damon – D'Eyncourt	1888	Stephen
15	Diamond – Drake	1888	Stephen
16	Drant – Edridge	1888	Stephen
17	Edward – Erskine	1889	Stephen
18	Esdale – Finan	1889	Stephen
19	Finch – Forman	1889	Stephen
20	Forrest – Garner	1889	Stephen
21	Garnett – Gloucester	1890	Stephen
22	Glover – Gravet	1890	Stephen & Lee
23	Gray – Haighton	1890	Stephen & Lee
24	Hailes – Harriott	1890	Stephen & Lee
25	Harris – Henry I	1891	Stephen & Lee
26	Henry II – Hindley	1891	Stephen & Lee
27	Hindmarsh – Hovenden	1891	Sidney Lee
28	Howard – Inglethorpe	1891	Sidney Lee
29	Inglish – John	1892	Sidney Lee
30	Johnes – Kenneth	1892	Sidney Lee
31	Kennett – Lambart	1892	Sidney Lee
32	Lambe – Leigh	1892	Sidney Lee
33	Leighton – Lluelyn	1893	Sidney Lee
34	Llywd – MacCartney	1893	Sidney Lee
35	MacCarwell – Maltby	1893	Sidney Lee
36	Malthus – Mason	1893	Sidney Lee
37	Masquerier – Millyng	1894	Sidney Lee
38	Milman – More	1894	Sidney Lee
39	Morehead – Myles	1894	Sidney Lee
40	Myllar – Nicholls	1894	Sidney Lee
41	Nichols – O'Dugan	1895	Sidney Lee
42	O'Duinn – Owen	1895	Sidney Lee
43	Owens – Passelewe	1895	Sidney Lee
44	Paston – Percy	1895	Sidney Lee
45	Pereira – Pockrich	1896	Sidney Lee
46	Pocock – Puckering	1896	Sidney Lee
47	Puckle – Reidfurd	1896	Sidney Lee
48	Reilly – Robins	1896	Sidney Lee
49	Robinson – Russell	1897	Sidney Lee
50	Russen – Scobell	1897	Sidney Lee
51	Scoffin – Sheares	1897	Sidney Lee
52	Shearman – Smirke	1897	Sidney Lee
53	Smith – Stanger	1898	Sidney Lee
54	Stanhope – Stovin	1898	Sidney Lee
55	Stow – Taylor	1898	Sidney Lee
56	Teach – Tollet	1898	Sidney Lee
57	Tom – Tytler	1899	Sidney Lee
58	Ubaldini – Wakefield	1899	Sidney Lee
59	Wakeman – Watkins	1899	Sidney Lee
60	Watson – Whewell	1899	Sidney Lee
61	Whichcord – Williams	1900	Sidney Lee
62	Williamson – Worden	1900	Sidney Lee
63	Wordsworth – Zuylestein	1900	Sidney Lee

== See also ==
- List of contributors to the Dictionary of National Biography
- Biographical dictionary
- Oxford Biography Index
- Historiography of the United Kingdom

The volumes of the first edition of the Dictionary of National Biography in various file formats in the Internet Archive
Volume	Date	From	To	Notes
Index and Epitome	1903			The Index, with a summary for each entry.
Volume 1	1885	Abbadie	Anne	
Volume 2	1885	Anneslya	Baird	
Volume 3	1885	Baker	Beadon	
Volume 4	1885	Beal	Biber	
Volume 5	1886	Bicheno	Bottisham	
Volume 6	1886	Bottomley	Browell	
Volume 7	1886	Brown	Burthogge	
Volume 8	1886	Burton	Cantwell	
Volume 9	1887	Canute	Chaloner	
Volume 10	1887	Chamber	Clarkson	
Volume 11	1887	Clater	Condell	
Volume 12	1887	Conder	Craigie	
Volume 13	1888	Craik	Damer	
Volume 14	1888	Damon	D'Eyncourt	
Volume 15	1888	Diamond	Drake	
Volume 16	1888	Drant	Edridge	
Volume 17	1889	Edward	Erskine	
Volume 18	1889	Esdaile	Finan	
Volume 19	1889	Finch	Forman	
Volume 20	1889	Forest	Garner	
Volume 21	1890	Garnett	Gloucester	
Volume 22	1890	Glover	Gravet	
Volume 22 supplement	1901	Glover	Gravet	
Volume 23	1890	Gray	Haighton	
Volume 24	1890	Hailes	Harriott	Incorrectly labeled as Volume 25
Volume 25	1891	Harris	Henry I	
Volume 26	1891	Henry II	Hindley	
Volume 27	1891	Hindmarsh	Hovenden	
Volume 28	1891	Howard	Inglethorp	
Volume 29	1892	Inglis	John	Truncated at p. 279, at Jeffreys G.
Volume 30	1892	Johnes	Kenneth	
Volume 31	1892	Kennett	Lambart	
Volume 32	1892	Lambre	Leigh	
Volume 33	1893	Leighton	Lluelyn	
Volume 34	1893	Llwyd	MacCartney	
Volume 35	1893	MacCarwell	Maltby	
Volume 36	1893	Malthus	Mason	
Volume 37	1894	Masquerier	Millyng	
Volume 38	1894	Milman	More	
Volume 39	1894	Morehead	Myles	
Volume 40	1894	Myllar	Nichols	
Volume 41	1895	Nichols	O'Dugan	
Volume 42	1895	O'Duinn	Owen	
Volume 43	1895	Owens	Passelewe	
Volume 44	1895	Paston	Percy	
Volume 45	1896	Pereira	Pochrich	
Volume 46	1896	Pocock	Puckering	
Volume 47	1896	Puckle	Reidfurd	
Volume 48	1896	Reily	Robins	
Volume 49	1897	Robinson	Russell	
Volume 50	1897	Russen	Scobell	
Volume 51	1897	Scoffin	Sheares	
Volume 52	1897	Shearman	Smirke	
Volume 53	1898	Smith	Stanger	
Volume 54	1898	Stanhope	Stovin	
Volume 55	1898	Stow	Taylor	
Volume 56	1898	Teach	Tollet	
Volume 57	1899	Tom	Tytler	
Volume 58	1899	Ubaldini	Wakefield	
Volume 59	1899	Wakeman	Watkins	
Volume 60	1899	Watson	Whewell	
Volume 61	1900	Whichcord	Williams	
Volume 62	1900	Williamson	Worden	
Volume 63	1900	Wordsworth	Zuylestein	
Supplementary volumes for the first edition
Supplement Volume 1	1901	Abbott	Childers	
Supplement Volume 2	1901	Chippendale	Hoste	
Supplement Volume 3	1901	How	Woodward	
Errata	1904			
The volumes of the second edition at Google Books
Volume 1	1908	Addadie	Beadon	
Volume 2	1908	Beal	Browell	
Volume 3	1908	Brown	Chaloner	
Volume 4	1908	Chamber	Craigie	
Volume 5	1908	Craik	Drake	
Volume 6	1908	Drant	Finan	
Volume 7	1908	Finch	Gloucester	
Volume 8	1908	Glover	Harriott	
Volume 9	1908	Harris	Hoveden	
Volume 10	1908	Howard	Kenneth	
Volume 11	1909	Kennett	Lluelyn	
Volume 12	1909	Llwyd	Mason	
Volume 13	1909	Masquerier	Myles	
Volume 14	1909	Myllar	Owen	
Volume 15	1909	Owens	Pockrich	
Volume 16	1909	Pockock	Robins	
Volume 17	1909	Robinson	Sheares	
Volume 18	1909	Shearman	Stovin	
Volume 19	1909	Stow	Tytler	
Volume 20	1909	Ubaldini	Whewell	
Volume 21	1909	Whichcord	Zuylestein	
Volume 22	1909			
Supplementary volumes for the second edition
Second supplement Volume 1	1912	Abbey	Eyre	
Second supplement Volume 2	1912	Faed	Muybridge	
Second supplement Volume 3	1912	Neil	Young	
Second series of supplementary volumes for the second edition
Second supplement	1927			
