= Donald Gray (priest) =

British Anglican priest and scholar (1930–2025)

The Reverend Canon Donald Gray CBE KStJ TD FSA FRHistS AKC
- Chaplain to the Speaker of the House of Commons
- Church: Church of England
- In office: 1987–1998
- Predecessor: Trevor Beeson
- Successor: Robert Wright
- Other post: Rector of St Margaret's, Westminster (1987–1998)

Personal details
- Born: Donald Clifford Gray; 21 July 1930 Manchester, England
- Died: 4 July 2025 (aged 94)
- Denomination: Anglicanism

Donald Clifford Gray CBE KStJ TD FSA FRHistS (21 July 1930 – 4 July 2025) was a British Anglican priest, chaplain and academic. From 1987 to 1998, he was Chaplain to the Speaker of the House of Commons and Rector of St Margaret's, Westminster.

== Early life and education ==
Gray was born in Manchester, England on 21 July 1930, the son of Henry Hackett Gray. His grandfather, Richard Hackett, was Father of the Chapel printer at the Manchester Guardian and president of the Typographical Association. Having trained for the priesthood at King's College London and St Boniface Missionary College, Warminster. He was awarded a Doctor of Philosophy (PhD) by the University of Manchester in 1984.

== Career ==
=== Ordained ministry ===
Gray was ordained in the Church of England as a deacon in 1956 and as a priest in 1957. He served as a priest in the Diocese of Manchester until becoming Rector of Liverpool the incumbent of Church of Our Lady and Saint Nicholas in 1974. He also worked as the Chaplain of Huyton College, a private all-girls school from the 1970s until the early 1980s when he was Canon Gray but was called by a different title to the girls who went there, all of whom respected and liked him greatly.

In 1987 he was appointed a canon of Westminster and Speaker's Chaplain. His role within the Westminster Chapter was that of Rector of St. Margaret's, Westminster. That role and that of Speaker's Chaplain have been practically, though not necessarily, combined for some years.

=== Military service ===
He was for several years an Honorary Chaplain to the Queen (a military form of chaplain to the Queen) through his involvement with the Territorial Army. In 1970 he was awarded the TD (Territorial Decoration). He was later appointed to the Royal Household as a chaplain to the Queen.

== Death ==
Gray died on 4 July 2025, at the age of 94.

== Honours ==
In 1988, Gray was elected a Fellow of the Royal Historical Society (FRHistS). On 22 February 2007, he was elected a Fellow of the Society of Antiquaries of London (FSA).

== Selected works ==
- Earth and Altar. Donald Gray, Alcuin / Canterbury Press (1986)
- Chaplain to Mr Speaker. Donald Gray. HMSO (1991). ISBN 0-10-850634-7
- Ronald Jasper, His Life, His Work, and the ASB. Donald Gray. SPCK (1997). ISBN 0-281-04976-9
- Percy Dearmer : A Parson's Pilgrimage. Donald Gray. Canterbury Press (2000). ISBN 1-85311-335-2
- Memorial Services. Donald Gray. Alcuin / SPCK (2002). ISBN 0-281-05406-1
- All Majesty and Power : An Anthology of Royal Prayers. Donald Gray, Editor. Hodder & Stoughton (2000)
- All Majesty and Power : An Anthology of Royal Prayers. Donald Gray, Editor. Eerdmans USA (2002) ISBN 0-8028-3957-6
- The 1927-1928 Prayer Book Crisis Part 1. Donald Gray. SCM-Canterbury Press (2005) ISBN 1-85311-727-7
- The 1927-1928 Prayer Book Crisis Part 2. Donald Gray. SCM-Canterbury Press (2006) ISBN 1-85311-743-9
