= St Margaret's, Westminster =

12th-century church in London, England

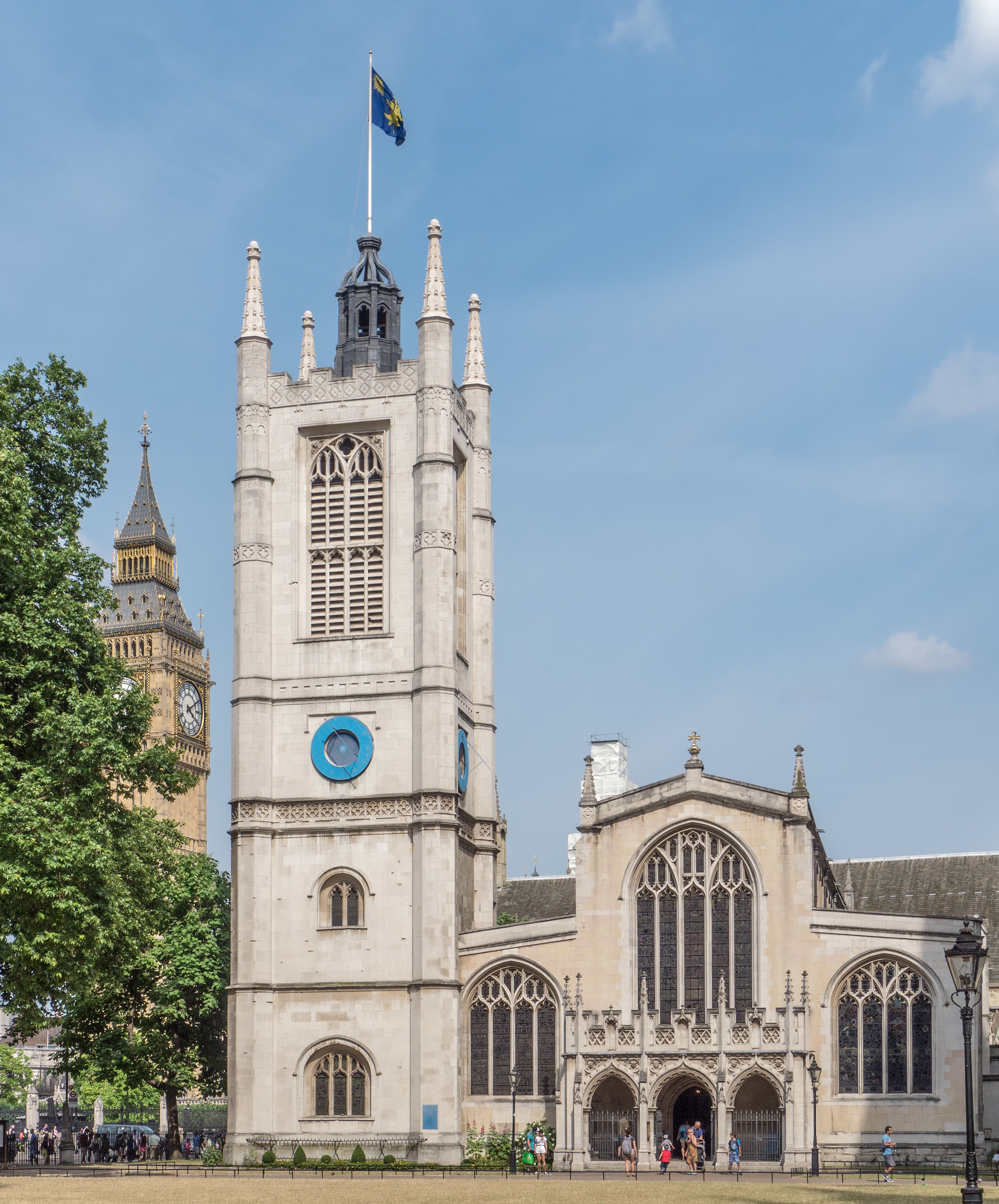
- St Margaret's, Westminster
- OS grid reference: TQ 30124 79547
- Location: St Margaret Street and SW1 London
- Country: England
- Denomination: Church of England
- Previous denomination: Roman Catholic
- Website: www.westminster-abbey.org/st-margarets-church

History
- Founded: c. 12th century
- Dedication: St Margaret
- Consecrated: 9 April 1523

Architecture
- Architects: J. L. Pearson; John James; George Gilbert Scott
- Architectural type: Church
- Style: Perpendicular Gothic; Tudor architecture
- Completed: 1523

Administration
- Province: Canterbury
- Diocese: London

Clergy
- Bishop: Sarah Mullally
- Rector: Mark Birch

UNESCO World Heritage Site
- Official name: Palace of Westminster, Westminster Abbey and Saint Margaret's Church
- Type: Cultural
- Criteria: i, ii, iv
- Designated: 1987 (11th session)
- Reference no.: 426
- Country: United Kingdom
- Region: Europe and North America

The Church of St Margaret, Westminster Abbey is an Anglican parish church in the grounds of Westminster Abbey on Parliament Square, London, England. It is dedicated to Margaret of Antioch, and forms part of a single World Heritage Site with the Palace of Westminster and Westminster Abbey.

== History and description ==
The church was founded in the twelfth century by Benedictine monks, so that local people who lived in the area around the Abbey could worship separately at their own simpler parish church, and historically it was within the hundred of Ossulstone in the county of Middlesex. In 1914, in a preface to Memorials of St. Margaret's Church, Westminster, a former Rector of St Margaret's, Hensley Henson, reported a mediaeval tradition that the church was as old as Westminster Abbey, owing its origins to the same royal saint, Edward the Confessor, and that "The two churches, conventual and parochial, have stood side by side for more than eight centuries – not, of course, the existing fabrics, but older churches of which the existing fabrics are successors on the same site."

St Margaret's was rebuilt from 1486 to 1523, at the instigation of King Henry VII, and the new church, which largely still stands today, was consecrated on 9 April 1523. It has been called "the last church in London decorated in the Catholic tradition before the Reformation", and on each side of a large rood cross there stood richly painted statues of St Mary and St John, while the building had several internal chapels. In the 1540s, the new church came near to demolition, when Edward Seymour, 1st Duke of Somerset, planned to take it down to provide good-quality materials for Somerset House, his own new palace in the Strand. He was only kept from carrying out his plan by the resistance of armed parishioners.

In 1614, St Margaret's became the parish church of the Palace of Westminster, when the Puritans of the seventeenth century, unhappy with the highly liturgical Abbey, chose to hold their Parliamentary services in a church they found more suitable: a practice that has continued since that time. An additional detached burial ground was added in 1625 at what is now Christchurch Gardens.

Between 1734 and 1738, the north-west tower was rebuilt to designs by John James; at the same time, the whole structure was encased in Portland stone. Both the eastern and the western porch were added later, with J. L. Pearson as architect. In 1878, the church's interior was greatly restored and altered to its current appearance by Sir George Gilbert Scott, although many Tudor features were retained.

In 1863, during preliminary explorations preparing for this restoration, Scott found several doors overlaid with what was believed to be human skin. After doctors had examined this skin, Victorian historians theorized that the skin might have been that of William the Sacrist, who organized a gang that, in 1303, robbed the King of the equivalent of, in modern currency, $100 million (see Richard of Pudlicott). It was a complex scheme, involving several gang members disguised as monks planting bushes on the palace. After the stealthy burglary six months later, the loot was concealed in these bushes. The historians believed that William the Sacrist was flayed alive as punishment and his skin was used to make these royal doors, perhaps situated initially at nearby Westminster Palace. Subsequent study revealed that the skins were bovine in origin, not human.

By the 1970s, the number of people living nearby was in the hundreds. Ecclesiastical responsibility for the parish was reallocated to neighbouring parishes by the Westminster Abbey and Saint Margaret Westminster Act 1972, and the church was brought under the authority of the Dean and Chapter of Westminster Abbey, ceasing to be a parish church.

In July 2020, it was announced, without any consultation, that regular Sunday worship at the church would cease, and the choir was disbanded. Members of the disbanded congregation launched a petition, which garnered more than 1700 signatures, and the regular community felt that The Abbey's services are not intimate, nor do they invite participation, being quite formal. The Abbey, lacking a regular congregation and is mostly made up of tourists was felt to be profoundly different in spirit to the worshiping community at St Margaret's, which consisted of 60-120 regular worshipers. The cessation of regular worship was lamented in the press, As of 2025, a weekly sung eucharist has been restarted on Sunday evenings.

An annual new year service for the Coptic Orthodox Church in Britain takes place in the church in October, and in 2016 Bishop Angaelos gave the sermon.

The Rector of St Margaret's is often a canon of Westminster Abbey.

=== Commemorative windows ===
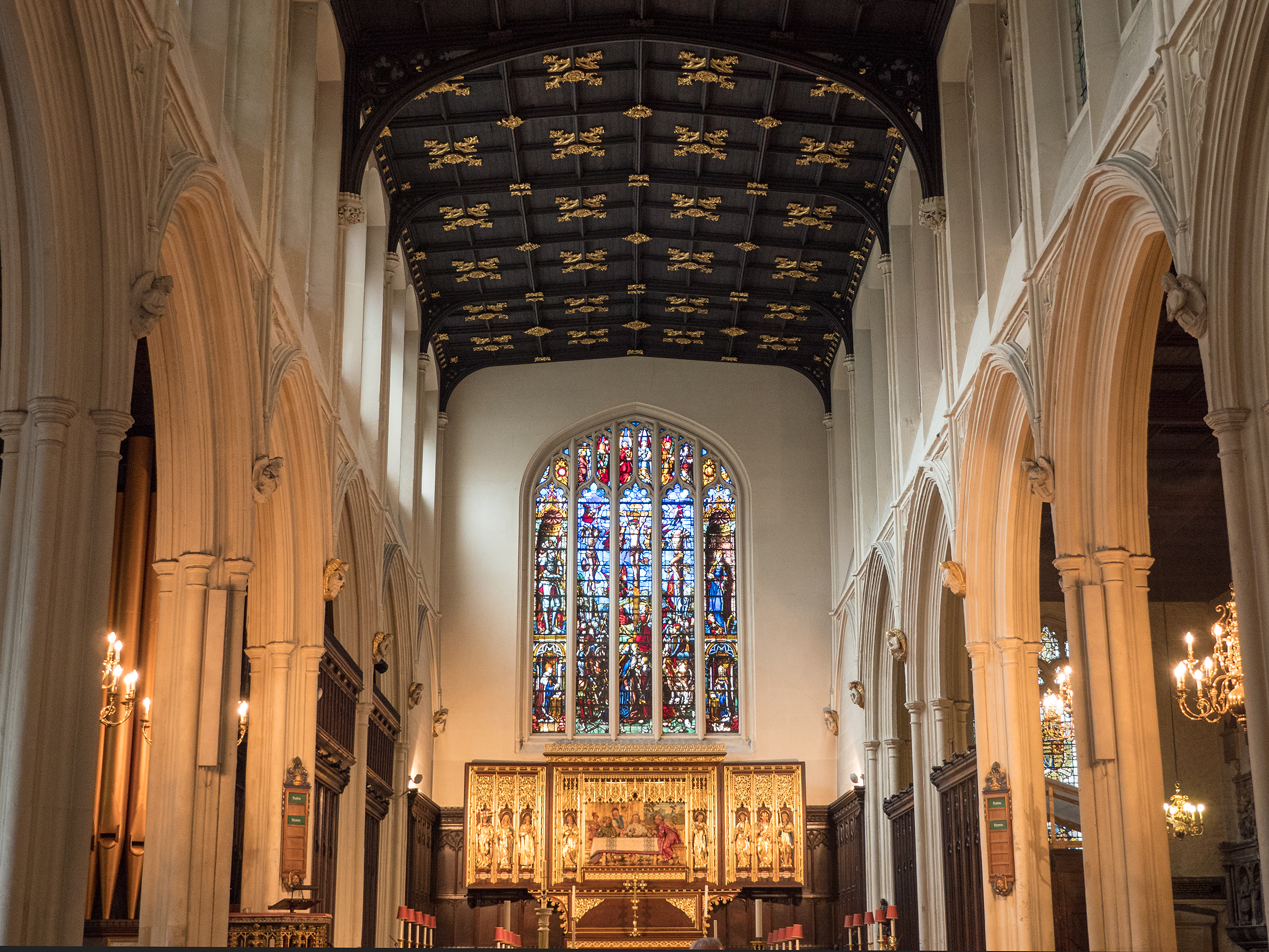
St Margaret's, Westminster, interior, 2016

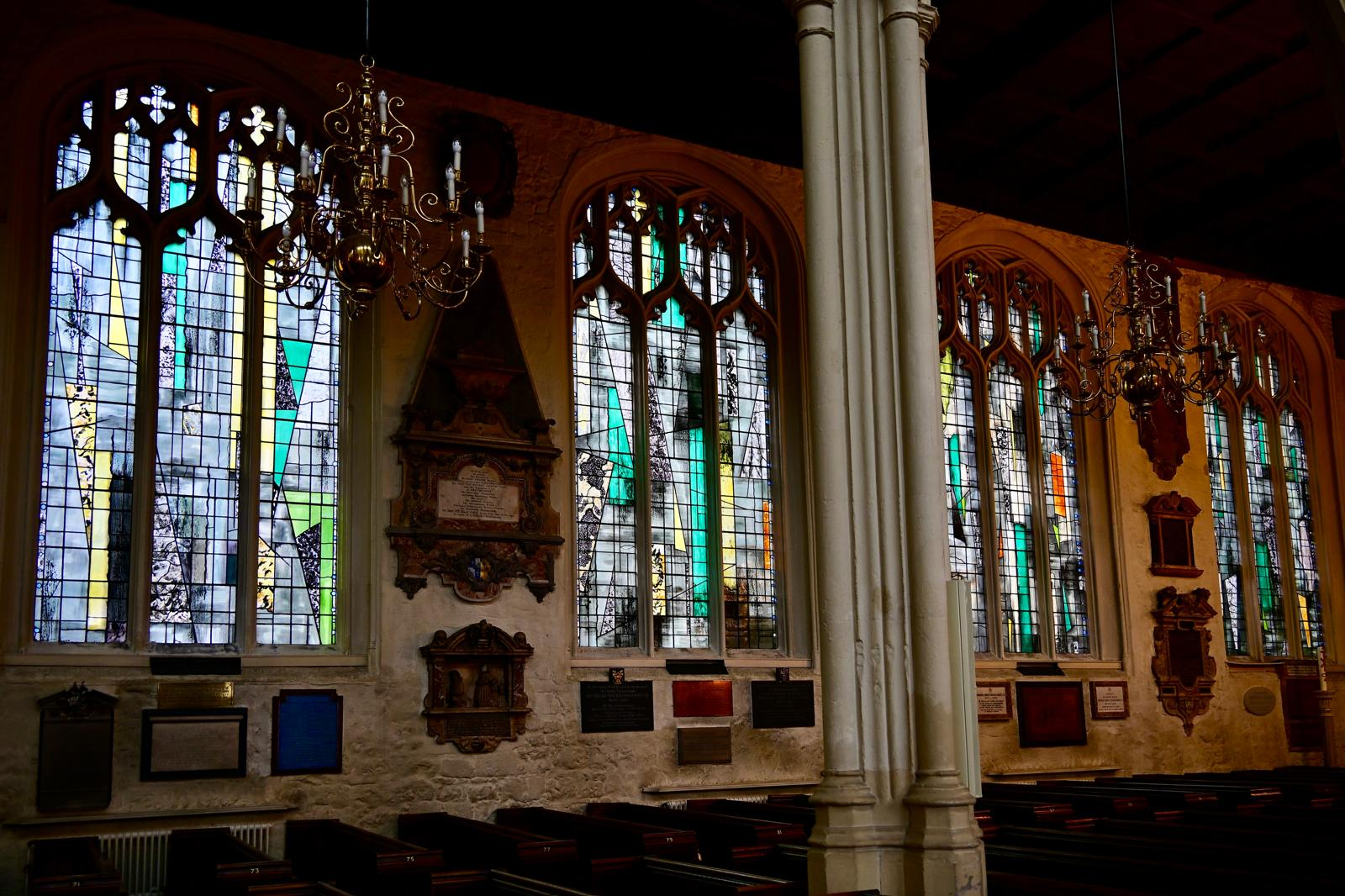
Four of the John Piper-designed windows in the south aisle

Notable windows include the east window of 1509 of Flemish stained glass, created to commemorate the betrothal of Catherine of Aragon to Henry VIII. This has had a chequered history. It was given by Henry VII to Waltham Abbey in Essex, and at the Dissolution of the Monasteries the last Abbot sent it to a private chapel at New Hall, Essex. That came into the possession of Thomas Boleyn, 1st Earl of Wiltshire, the father of Anne Boleyn, then Thomas Radclyffe, 3rd Earl of Sussex, next George Villiers, 1st Duke of Buckingham, after him Oliver Cromwell, from whom it reverted to the second Duke of Buckingham, next General Monk, Duke of Albemarle, and after him John Olmius, then Mr Conyers of Copt Hall, Essex, whose son sold the window to the parish of St Margaret's in 1758, for 400 guineas. The money came from a grant of £4,000, which parliament had made to the parish that year for the renovation of the church and the rebuilding of the chancel.

Other windows commemorate William Caxton, England's first printer, who was buried at the church in 1491, Sir Walter Raleigh, executed in Old Palace Yard and then also buried in the church in 1618, the poet John Milton, a parishioner of the church, and Admiral Robert Blake.

The Victorian glass that once filled the eight bays of the south aisle was destroyed by enemy action during the Second World War. In 1966, all eight windows were provided with new glass designed by John Piper and made by his longtime collaborator Patrick Reyntiens. Piper's unified scheme filled each window with an uncompromisingly modern abstract design, intended to create a "total impression of living radiance, in shades of silvery grey predominantly with splashes of pale greens, yellows and blues in varied density, to filter the daylight." The new windows were dedicated on 15 January 1967 in memory of Canon Carnegie and his wife, Peter Kemp-Welch, Clarence Fletcher and Richard Costain.

== Weddings ==
As well as marrying its own parishioners, the church has long been a popular venue for society weddings, as Members of Parliament, peers, and officers of the House of Lords and House of Commons can choose to be married in it. Notable weddings include:

- 5 July 1631: Edmund Waller and Anne Banks, who was an heiress and a ward of the Court of Aldermen, were married at the church in defiance of orders of the Court and the Privy Council of England. Waller had previously carried the bride off and been forced to return her. On a complaint being made to the Star Chamber, Waller was pardoned by King Charles I.
- 13 May 1654: Lady Mary Springett (William Penn's mother-in-law) and Isaac Pennington
- 1 December 1655: Samuel Pepys and Elisabeth Marchant de St. Michel
- 12 November 1656: John Milton and Katherine Woodcock
- 12 June 1895: William Hicks and Grace Lynn Joynson
- 12 September 1908: Winston Churchill and Clementine Hozier
- 21 April 1920: Harold Macmillan, and Lady Dorothy Cavendish
- 18 July 1922: Lord Louis Mountbatten, and Edwina Ashley
- 8 October 1993: David Armstrong-Jones, Viscount Linley, and the Hon. Serena Stanhope

Other notable weddings include some of the Bright Young People.

== Baptisms ==
- Charles Weston, 3rd Earl of Portland, 19 May 1639
- Barbara Villiers, only child of Lord Grandison and a future royal mistress of King Charles II, was christened in the church on 27 November 1640.
- Charles Montagu, 1st Earl of Halifax, was christened in the church on 12 May 1661
- Charles FitzRoy, 2nd Duke of Cleveland, eldest son of Barbara Villiers, was christened in the church on 16 June 1662, when the father's name was given as her husband, Lord Castlemaine, instead of as the King, who later acknowledged the child as his. In October 1850 The Gentleman's Magazine reported this entry and claimed it as "an untruth" and "a new fact in the secret history of Charles II".
- Thomas Pelham-Clinton, 3rd Duke of Newcastle, 28 July 1752
- Olaudah Equiano, a slave who bought his freedom, becoming a key abolitionist, was christened as Gustavus on 9 February 1759, when he was described in the parish register as "Gustavus Vassa a Black born in Carolina 12 years old".

== Burials ==
- William Caxton, 1491
- John Sutton, 3rd Baron Dudley, "Lord Quondam", 18 September 1553; and his wife Lady Cicely Grey, 28 April 1554
- Nicholas Ludford, 1557
- John Sheppard, December 1558, composer
- Blanche Parry, 1590
- Thomas Churchyard, 1604, Elizabethan poet, soldier and courtier
- Sir Walter Raleigh, 1618
- William Murray, 2nd Earl of Tullibardine, 30 July 1627
- Edward Grimeston, 14 December 1640
- Following the Restoration of the Monarchy, in 1661 several Parliamentarians who had been buried in Westminster Abbey, Admiral Robert Blake, Denis Bond, Nicholas Boscawen, Mary Bradshaw, Sir William Constable, Admiral Richard Deane, Isaac Dorislaus, Anne Fleetwood, Thomas Hesilrige, Humphrey Mackworth, Stephen Marshall, Thomas May, John Meldrum, Admiral Edward Popham, John Pym, Humphrey Salwey, William Strong, William Strode, and William Twisse, were all disinterred from there and reburied in an unmarked pit in St Margaret's churchyard, on the orders of King Charles II. A memorial to them is set into the external wall to the left of the main west entrance.
- Mary [Davies] [Born 1675] Widow of Sir Thomas Grosvenor, 3rd Baronet; she is buried in the courtyard close to the north porch of the church
- Wenceslas Hollar, March 1677
- Thomas Blood, 1680
- John West, 6th Baron De La Warr, 1723
- Bishop Nicholas Clagett, 1746
- Elizabeth Elstob, scholar and early feminist, 1756.
- Ignatius Sancho, composer, writer, slavery abolitionist, 1780
- Henry Constantine Jennings, 1819

== Funerals and memorial services ==
- Jeremy Thorpe, ex-leader of Liberal Party
- Antony Armstrong-Jones, 1st Earl of Snowdon
- Lady Elizabeth Shakerley

== Other notable events ==
On Easter day 1555 in the reign of Mary I a Protestant ex-Benedictine monk, William Flower inflicted wounds to the administerer of the sacrament. He repented for the injuries but would not repent his motive which was rejection of the doctrine of transubstantiation. He was thus sentenced for heresy and a week later severed of his hand and burned at the stake outside the church.

During the First World War, Edward Lyttelton, headmaster of Eton, gave a sermon in the church on the theme of "loving your enemies", promoting the view that any post-war treaty with Germany should be a just one and not vindictive. He had to leave the church after the service by a back door, while a number of demonstrators sang "Rule, Britannia!" in protest at his attitude.

== Choirs ==
Until 2019, the treble choristers for St Margaret's were supplied by Westminster Under School. In September 2023, a new choir for girls aged 11 to 17 was formed, to sing for regular liturgical services alongside the professional singers of the St Margaret's Consort.

The church also hosted the first performance by the UK Parliament Choir under Simon Over in 2000.

== Organ ==
An organ was installed in 1806 by John Avery. The current organ is largely built by J. W. Walker & Sons Ltd. A specification of the organ can be found on the National Pipe Organ Register.

== Rectors ==
Mackenzie Walcott lists the following as officiating clergymen:

- c. 1503 Sir John Conyers, curate
- c. 1509 Sir John Symes, curate
- c. 1519 Mr. Hall, curate
- c. 1521 Sir Robert Danby, curate
- c. 1530 William Tenant, curate
- 1594 William Drap
- c. 1610 William Murrey
- c. 1621 Prosper Styles, curate
- c. 1622 Isaac Bargrave, minister
- c. 1638 Gilbert Wymberly, minister
- 1640 Stephen Marshall, lecturer
- 1642 Samuel Gibson
- 1644 Mr. Eaton, minister
- 1649 John Binns
- 1657 Mr. Wyner / Mr. Warmstree, lecturer
- 1661 William Tucker, curate
- c. 1670 William Owtram (also minister in 1664)
- 1679–1683 Thomas Sprat
- 1683–1724† Nicholas Onley
- 1724–1730† Edward Gee
- 1730–1734 James Hargrave
- 1734–1753† Scawen Kenrick
- 1753–1784† Thomas Wilson
- 1784–1788† John Taylor
- 1788–1796† Charles Wake
- 1796–1827† Charles Fynes-Clinton
- 1828–1835 James Webber

Under the Ecclesiastical Commissioners Act 1840, this rectory was annexed to the canonry of Westminster Abbey then held by Henry Hart Milman, such that he and his successors as Canon would be Rector ex officio. This arrangement continued until 1978. The Rector was often (and continuously from 1972 to 2010) also the Chaplain to the Speaker of the House of Commons.

- 1835–1849 Henry Hart Milman
- 1849–1864† William Cureton
- 1864–1876† William Conway
- 1876–1895 Frederic Farrar (also Speaker's Chaplain from 1890)
- 1895–1899 Robert Eyton
- 1899–1900 Joseph Armitage Robinson
- 1900–1912 Hensley Henson
- 1912–1936† William Hartley Carnegie (also Speaker's Chaplain from 1916)
- 1936–1940† Vernon Storr
- 1941–1946 Alan Don (also Speaker's Chaplain since 1936)
- 1946–1956 Charles Smyth
- 1957–1969 Michael Stancliffe (also Speaker's Chaplain from 1961)
- 1970–1978 David Edwards (also Speaker's Chaplain from 1972)
- 1978–1982 John Baker (also Speaker's Chaplain)
- 1982–1987 Trevor Beeson (also Speaker's Chaplain)
- 1987–1998 Donald Gray (also Speaker's Chaplain)
- 1998–2010 Robert Wright (also Speaker's Chaplain)
- 2010–2016 Andrew Tremlett
- 2016–2020 Jane Sinclair
- 2020–present Anthony Ball

† Rector died in post

== Organists and Directors of Music ==
Organists who have played at St Margaret's include:

- Robert Whyte 1570–1574
- John Egglestone
- John Parsons 1616–1621 (then organist of Westminster Abbey)
- John Hilton 1628–1657 (?)
- John Blow, 1695–????
- Bernard Smith, 1676–1708
- Henry Turner 1708–????
- John Illam ????–1726
- Edward Purcell, son of Henry Purcell, 1726–1740
- James Butler 1740–1772
- William Rock 1774–1802
- Michael Rock 1802–1809
- John Bernard Sale 1809–1838
- T.G. Baines around 1864
- Walter Galpin Alcock ????–1896
- Edwin Lemare 1897–1902
- Reginald Goss-Custard 1902–1914
- Edwin Stephenson 1914–1922 (formerly organist of St Philip's Cathedral, Birmingham)
- Edgar Stanley Roper ?–1929 (Also Organist & Composer to His Majesty's Chapel Royal, St. James' Palace)
- Herbert Dawson 1929–1965
- Martin Neary 1965–1972
- Richard Hickox 1972–1982
- Thomas Trotter 1982–

Directors of Music at St Margaret's have included Richard Hickox, Simon Over, Aidan Oliver and (currently) Greg Morris.

== Gallery ==
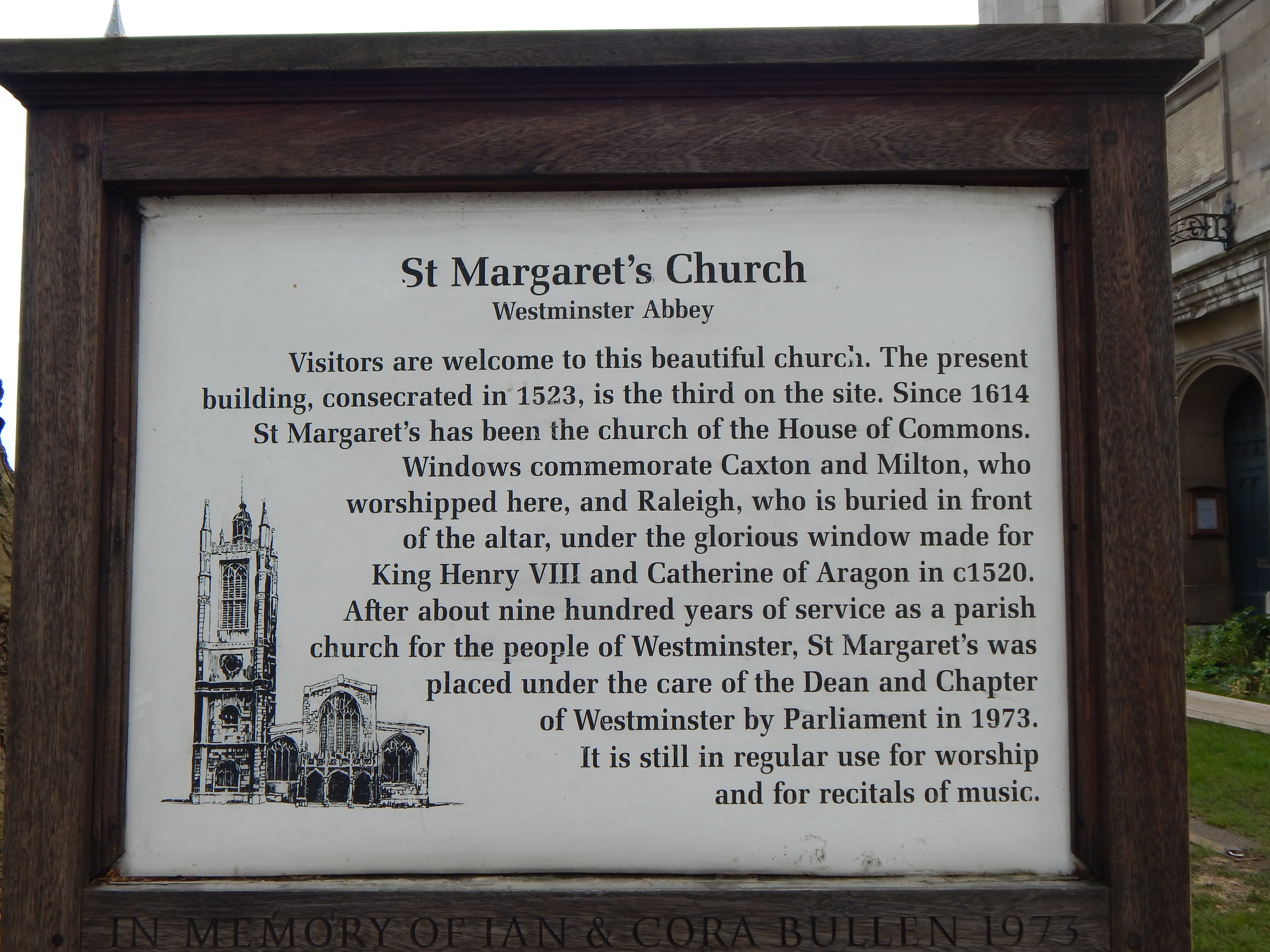
Explanatory plaque

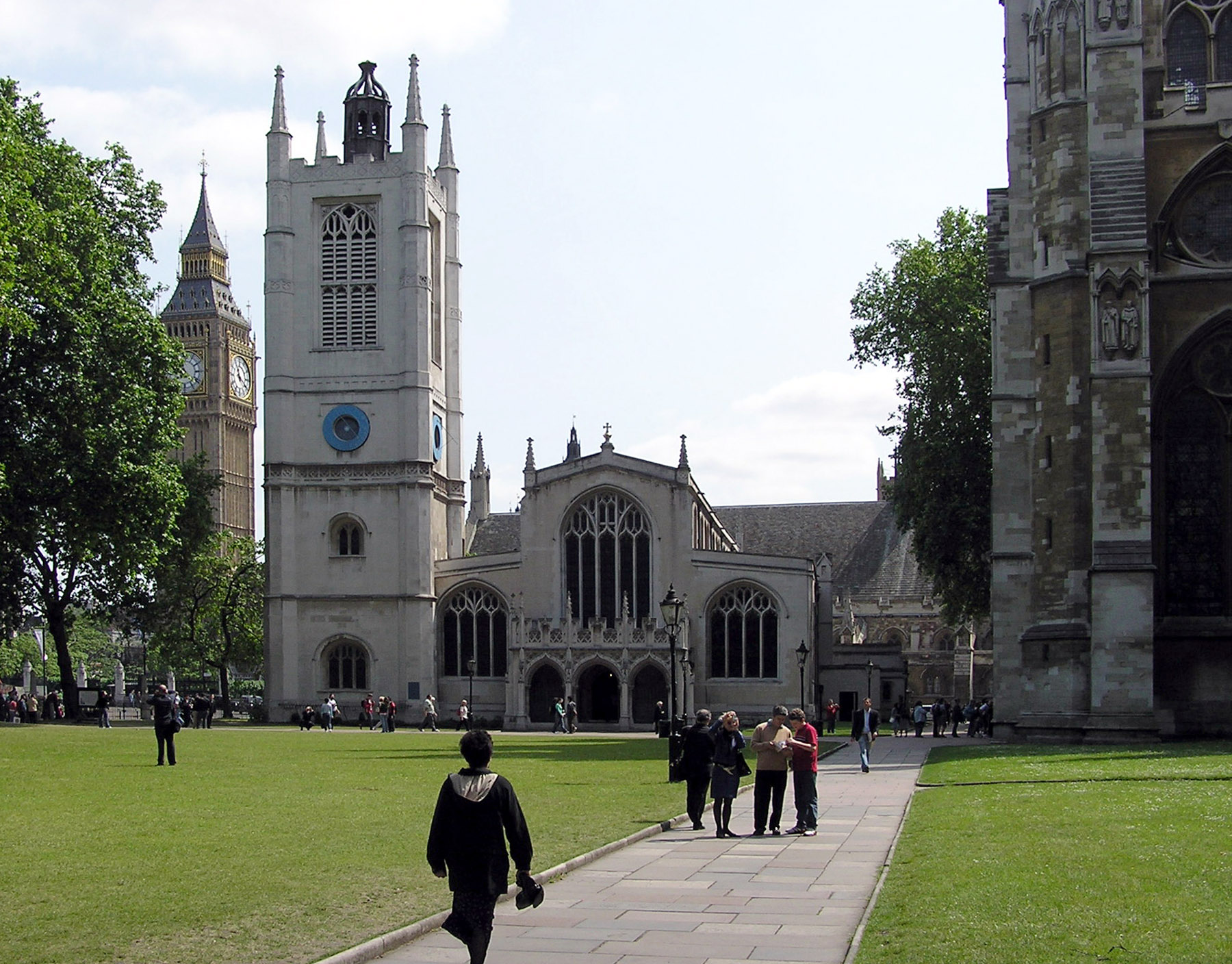
St Margaret's Church. To the left is the Elizabeth Tower of the Palace of Westminster; to the right is the Abbey.

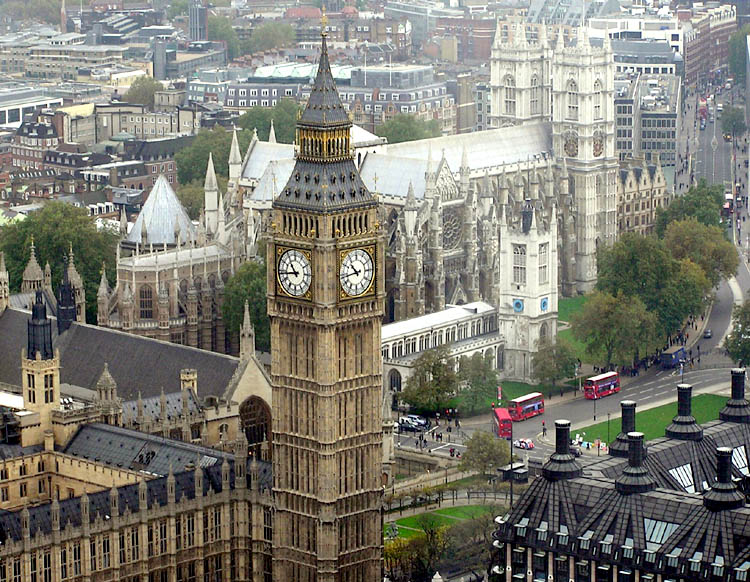
St Margaret's, seen from the London Eye Ferris wheel

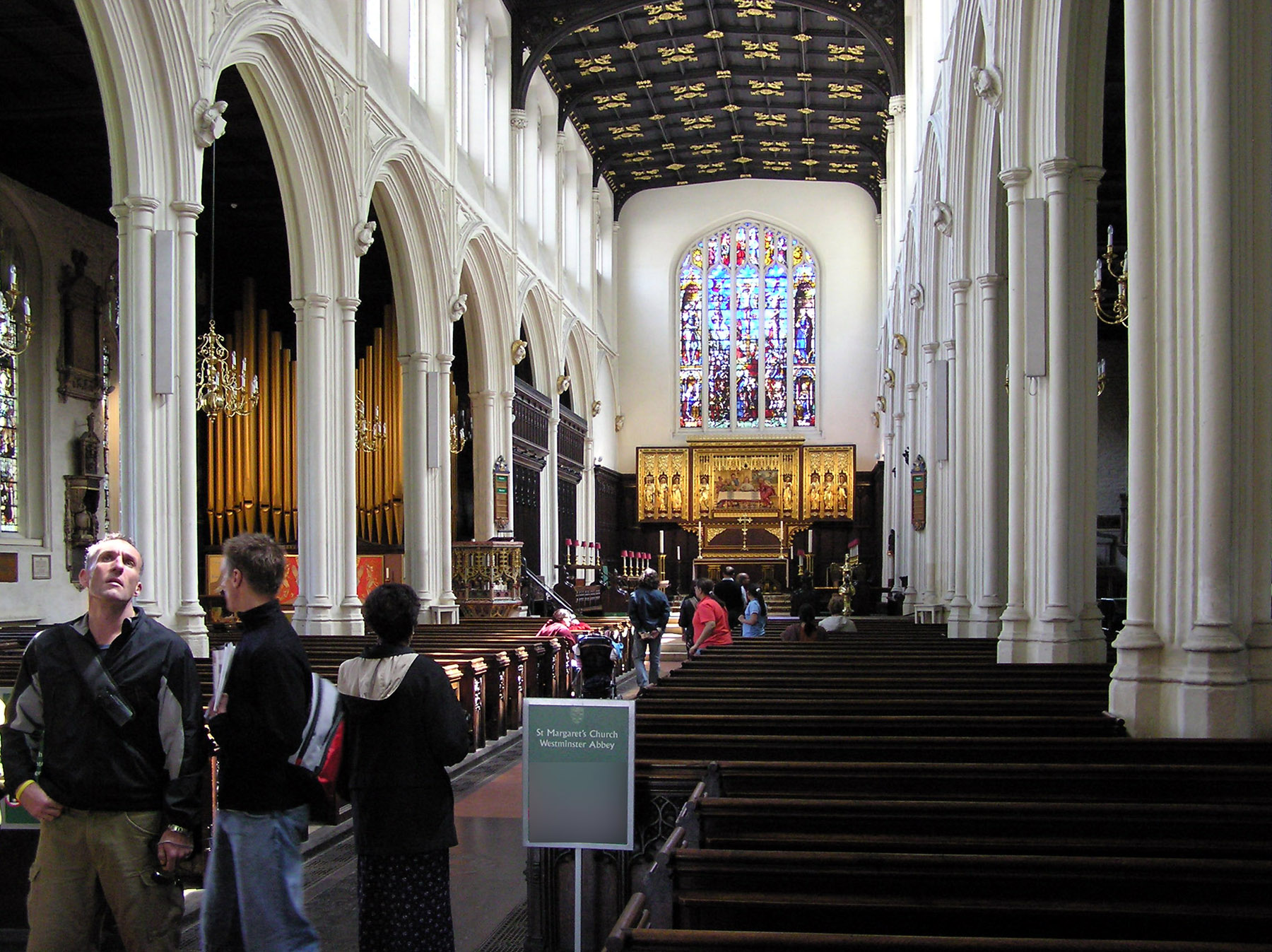
The nave of St Margaret's

Flag of St Margaret's, flown from the bell tower

== See also ==
- List of ecclesiastical restorations and alterations by J. L. Pearson
