= Richard Palmer =

Richard Palmer may refer to:

- Richard Palmer (bishop) (c. 1130–1195), English archbishop of Messina
- Richard Palmer (priest) (c. 1714–1805), English priest, Chaplain to the Speaker of the House of Commons
- Richard Palmer (entrepreneur), founder of the company d3o Lab
- Richard F. Palmer (1930–2018), American newspaper editor and politician
- Richard G. Palmer (born 1949), British physicist
- Richard H. Palmer (1876–1931), tennis player
- Richard N. Palmer (born 1950), Associate Justice of the Connecticut Supreme Court
- Richard Palmer-James (born 1947), lyricist for King Crimson and Supertramp
- Richard Robert Palmer (1930–2010), an American political activist also known as Robin Palmer
- A. Richard Palmer, biologist
- Richard Palmer (cricketer) (1848–1939), English cricketer

== See also ==
- Dick Palmer (disambiguation)
- Ricardus le Palmere, English MP
