= Mark Birch (priest) =

The Reverend Canon Mark Birch MVO
- Canon Rector of Westminster Abbey (2024–present)
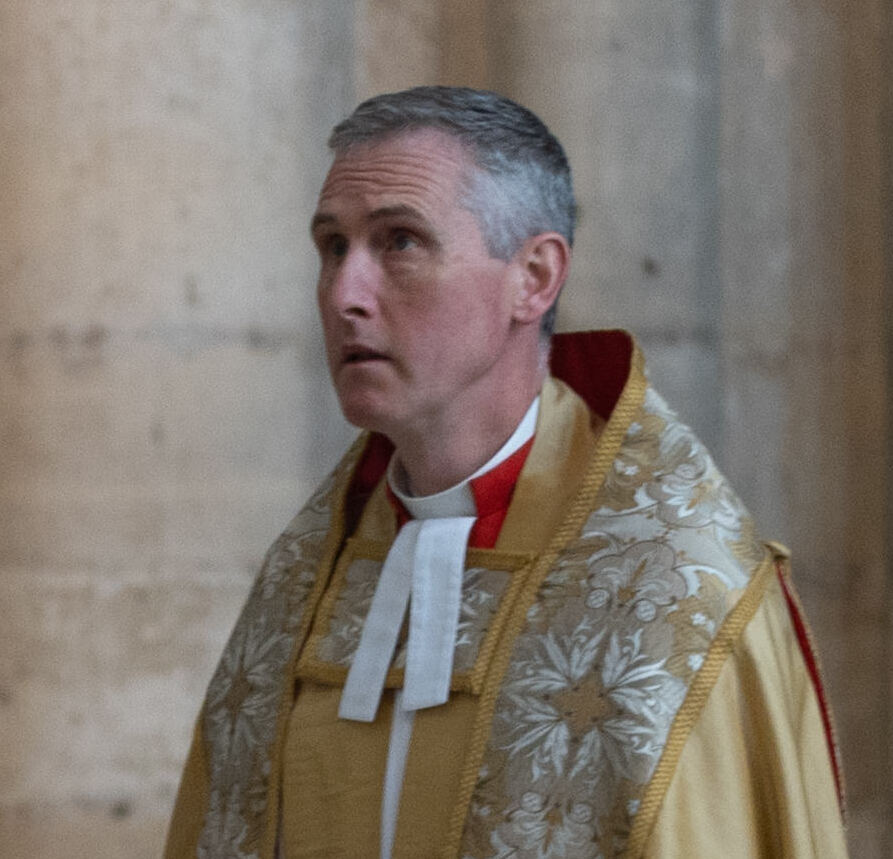
- Birch in 2024
- Church: Church of England
- Other post: Canon Rector of Westminster Abbey (2024–present)

Orders
- Ordination: 2000 (deacon); 2001 (priest)

Personal details
- Born: 1970 (age 55–56)
- Denomination: Anglicanism
- Education: University of Bristol; Westcott House, Cambridge; Emmanuel College, Cambridge

Mark Russell Birch, MVO (born 25 April 1970) is a British Anglican priest and chaplain. He is a canon of Westminster Abbey. After working as a vet, he trained for ordination at Westcott House, Cambridge. He served as a chaplain at an Oxford University college, a children's hospice and a special school for disabled children and young adults. He was priest-in-charge of St Faith's Church, Winchester, before joining Westminster Abbey in 2014 as a chaplain and minor canon. He was made precentor in 2020 and has served as canon rector since 2024. Between 2024 and 2026 he was Chaplain to the Speaker of the House of Commons.

== Biography ==
Birch graduated with a Bachelor of Veterinary Science (BVSc) from the University of Bristol in 1993. His short early career was as a veterinarian. From 1997 to 2000, he trained for ordination at Westcott House, Cambridge. During that time, he also studied theology at Emmanuel College, Cambridge, graduating with a Bachelor of Arts (BA) degree in 1999.

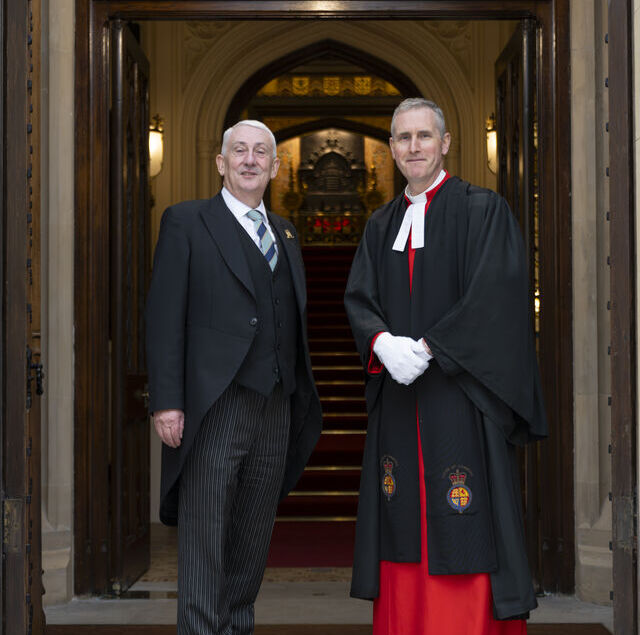
Birch (right) with Speaker Sir Lindsay Hoyle in 2024

Birch was ordained in the Church of England as a deacon in 2000 and as a priest in 2001. From 2000 to 2003, he undertook his curacy at the Church of St John the Baptist, Cirencester, in the Diocese of Gloucester. He then served as chaplain at Exeter College, a college of Oxford University (2003–2005); at Helen & Douglas House, a children's hospice (2006–2010); and at Treloar School, a special school for disabled children and young adults (2010–2014). From 2012 to 2014, he was priest-in-charge of St Faith's Church, Winchester and chaplain to the Hospital of St Cross.

In January 2015, he joined Westminster Abbey as a chaplain and minor canon. He was appointed precentor in 2020, becoming responsible for the daily worship at the Abbey and planning many of its special services. He took part in the funeral of Queen Elizabeth II on 19 September 2022; leading the prayers from ministers and clergy of different Christian denominations. In the 2023 Demise Honours, he was appointed Member of the Royal Victorian Order (MVO) for services to the State Funeral of Her Majesty Queen Elizabeth II. He also led the rehearsals for the coronation of Charles III in 2023.

On 26 September 2024, it was announced that he would be the next Chaplain to the Speaker of the House of Commons, in succession to Tricia Hillas. He took up the appointment as the 81st Speaker's Chaplain on 7 November 2024. He was also appointed canon rector of Westminster Abbey, with special responsibility for in its ministry in the public square. On 3 February 2026 it was announced that Mark Birch was to head up the public engagement programme at Westminster Abbey, and the next Speaker's Chaplain would be Andrew Hillier.

Religious titles
Preceded by Tricia Hillas	Chaplain to the Speaker of the House of Commons; 2024 to 2026	Succeeded by Andrew Hillier
