= Richard Cope (disambiguation) =

Richard Cope was a minister.

Richard Cope may also refer to:

- Sir Richard Cope, 9th Baronet (died 1806)
- Richard Whittaker Cope, designer of the Albion press

== See also ==
- Cope (surname)
