= Peter Birch =

Peter Birch may refer to:

- Peter Birch (priest) (c. 1652–1710), Church of England clergyman and divine
- Peter Birch (actor) (1952–2017), British actor
- Peter Birch (bishop) (1911–1981), Roman Catholic bishop of Ossory, 1964–1981
- Peter Birch (Emmerdale), a fictional character in Emmerdale
- Peter Birch-Reichenwald (1843–1898), Norwegian politician
