= AKC =

AKC may refer to:

- American Kennel Club, registry of purebred dog pedigrees in the US
- Associate of King's College, an award of King's College London since 1833
- Ananda Kentish Coomaraswamy (1877−1947), Ceylonese philosopher and metaphysician
