= St Mark's Church, Leicester =

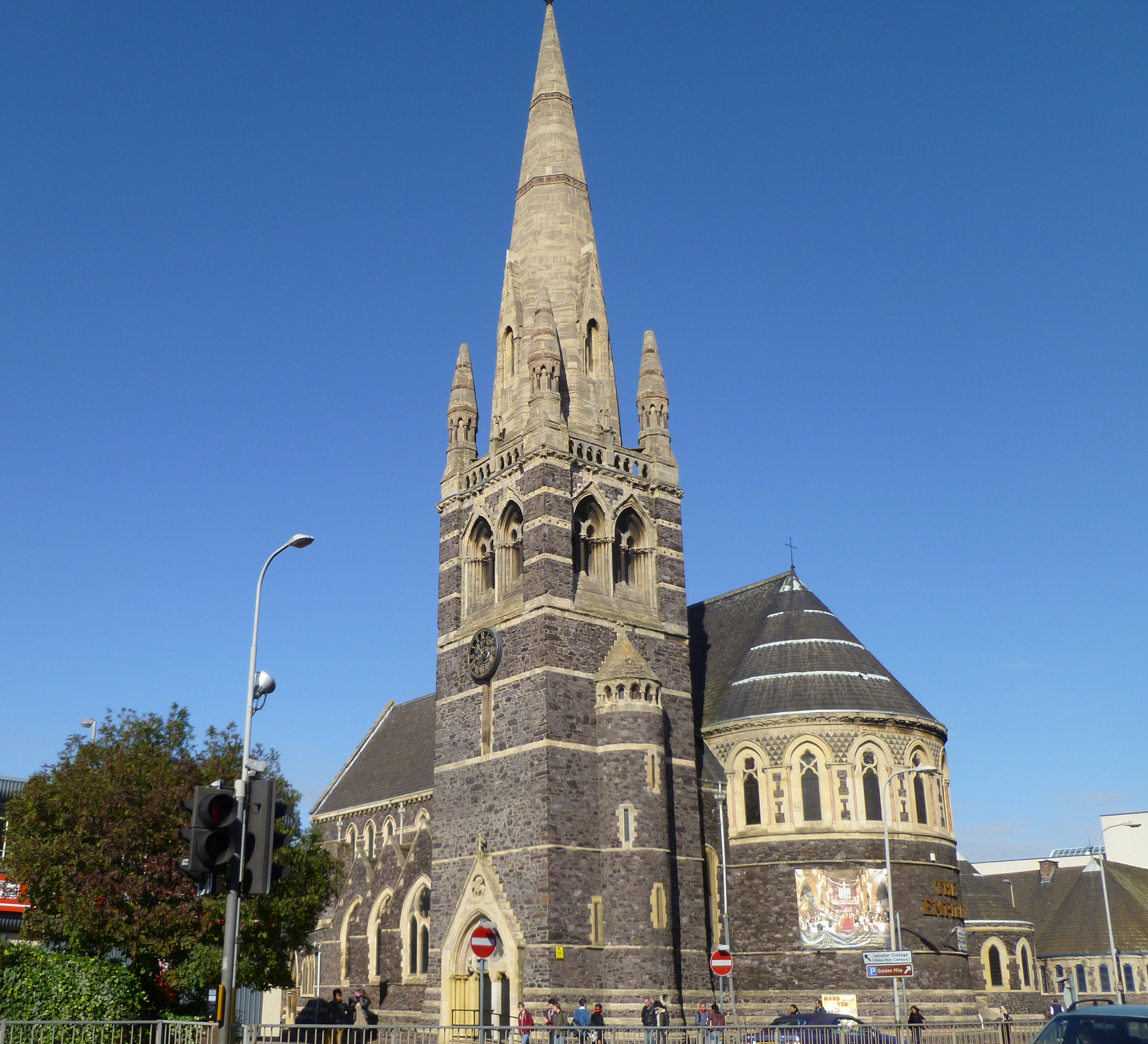
- St Mark's Church, Leicester
- 52°38′34″N 1°07′42.4″W
- OS grid reference: SK 59056 05366
- Location: Leicester
- Country: England
- Denomination: Church of England

History
- Dedication: St Mark
- Consecrated: 25 April 1872

Architecture
- Heritage designation: Grade II* listed
- Architect: Ewan Christian
- Groundbreaking: 1870
- Completed: 1872
- Closed: 1986

Specifications
- Length: 99.5 feet (30.3 m)

St Mark's Church, Leicester is a Grade II* listed former parish church in the Church of England in Leicester, England.

== History ==
The foundation stone was laid in 1870 by the Bishop of Peterborough. The church was the gift of William Perry-Herrick and built to the designs of the architect Ewan Christian. The contractor for the foundations was Firn of Leicester, Osbourne of Leicester constructed the building. The clerk of works was James Nichols. The bells were supplied by Taylor of Loughborough, and the clock was from Moore of Clerkenwell, London.

The church was consecrated on Saint Mark's Day, 25 April 1872 by the Bishop of Peterborough.

The stained glass windows inserted at the time of the consecration in the chancel were by Ward and Hughes. Later additions include windows in the south east chapel by Henry Holiday in 1893 and in the north east chapel by Charles Eamer Kempe in 1895.

The west end was completed in 1903 by Ernest Charles Shearman.

The apse contained a painting by James Eadie Reid dating from 1910 “The Triumph and Apotheosis of Labour”.

=== Redundancy and subsequent use ===
The church was made redundant by the Church of England in 1986 after which it remained vacant until being converted into a conference and wedding venue known as 'The Empire Banqueting Hall' in 2005.

== Incumbents ==
- Canon H.J. Burfield 1872 - 1883 (formerly vicar of St James’ Church, Bradford)
- John N.B. Roodroffe 1883 - 1896 (formerly vicar of St Mark’s Church, Peterborough, afterwards vicar of King’s Cliffe)
- Frederick Lewis Donaldson 1897 - 1918 (later Archdeacon of Westminster)
- Albert Linwood Wright 1918 - 1946
- John Fielder 1946 - 1954 (afterwards vicar of Knighton)
- Harold A. Raymond 1954 - 1957
- Charles J.E. Stephens 1957 - 1976
- Peter Farrell

== Organ ==
The pipe organ was built by William Hill & Sons in 1871. A specification of the organ can be found on the National Pipe Organ Register.
