= Church of All Saints, Cuddesdon =

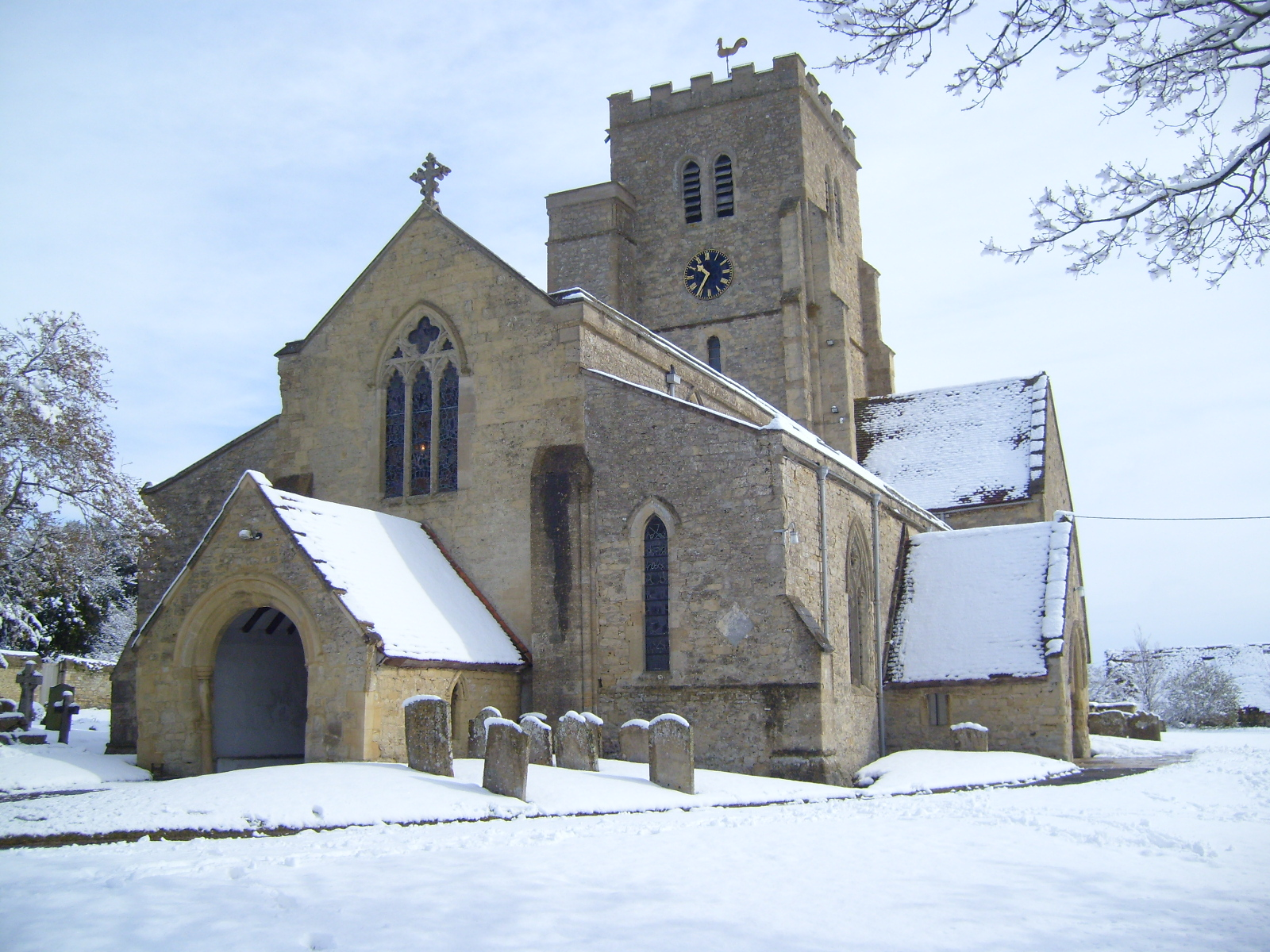
- All Saints in the snow
- Church of All Saints, Cuddesdon
- OS grid reference: SP 60076 03054
- Location: Church Road, Cuddesdon, Oxfordshire, OX44 9HD
- Country: England
- Denomination: Church of England
- Churchmanship: Liberal Catholic

History
- Status: Active

Architecture
- Functional status: Parish church
- Heritage designation: Grade I listed
- Designated: 18 July 1963

Administration
- Diocese: Diocese of Oxford
- Archdeaconry: Archdeaconry of Dorchester
- Deanery: Aston and Cuddesdon
- Parish: Cuddesdon

Clergy
- Vicar: The Revd Tom Wallis

The Church of All Saints is a Church of England parish church in Cuddesdon, Oxfordshire. The church is a grade I listed building and it dates from the 12th century.

== History ==
Abingdon Abbey founded the parish in Cuddesdon in about AD 1180. The church dates from the middle of the 12th century.

The chancel was restored in 1849 by Benjamin Ferrey, and the rest of the church was restored between 1851 and 1853 by G. E. Street.

The church was designated as a grade I listed building on 18 July 1963.

== Present day ==
Today, the Church of All Saints is part of the Benefice of Garsington, Cuddesdon and Horspath in the Archdeaconry of Dorchester of the Diocese of Oxford. The church stands in the Liberal Catholic tradition of the Church of England.

Due to its proximately, the church has close links with Ripon College Cuddesdon, an Anglican theological college. The college attends the church's evensong each day.

== Notable clergy ==
- Fr William Fletcher Bishop, later Principal of the College of the Resurrection and Superior of the Community of the Resurrection, served his curacy here from 1933 to 1937
- John Baker, later Bishop of Salisbury, served his curacy here from 1954 to 1957
- Mark Chapman, Professor of the History of Modern Theology at the University of Oxford, non-stipendiary minister of the parish since 2014
- Alastair Redfern, later Bishop of Derby, an honorary curate of the parish from 1983 to 1987
- Mark Santer, later Principal of Westcott House, Cambridge, Bishop of Kensington, and Bishop of Birmingham, served his curacy here from 1963 to 1967
- Michael Scott-Joynt, later Bishop of Winchester, served his curacy here from 1967 to 1970
- Brian Smith, later Bishop of Edinburgh, served his curacy here from 1976 to 1979
- Martin Wharton, later Bishop of Newcastle, was a priest of the parish from 1979 to 1983

=== List of vicars ===
- 1945–1952: Kenneth Riches, later Bishop of Dorchester and Bishop of Lincoln
- 1952–1960: Edward Knapp-Fisher, later Bishop of Pretoria
- 1960–1970: Robert Runcie, later Archbishop of Canterbury
- 1970–1977: Leslie Houlden, later Professor of Theology at King's College, London
- 1977–1985: David Wilcox, later Bishop of Dorking
- 2014–2019: Emma Pennington
- 2020–2024: Karen Charman
- 2024–present: Tom Wallis
