= William Carnegie =

William Carnegie may refer to:

- William Carnegie, 7th Earl of Northesk (1756–1831), English admiral
- William Carnegie, 8th Earl of Northesk (1794–1878), son of the above
- William Hartley Carnegie (1860–1936), Anglican priest and author
- William Carnegie, former leader of the Green Party of Alberta
