= David Hutt =

British Anglican priest

David Handley Hutt (born 24 August 1938) is a British Anglican priest. He was Archdeacon of Westminster from 1999 to 2005.

== Early life and education ==
Hutt was educated at Brentwood; Sandhurst; and King's College London. He was an officer in the Queen's Surreys from 1957 to 1964.

== Ordained ministry ==
He was ordained deacon in 1969, and priest in 1970. After curacies at Bedford Park and Westminster he was Priest Vicar and Succentor of Southwark Cathedral. He was Senior Chaplain of King's College, Taunton from 1978 to 1982. He then held incumbencies at St Alban and St Patrick, Birmingham ( 1982–1986); and All Saints, Margaret Street (1986–1995). He was a Canon of Westminster from 1995 to 2006. He was also Sub-Dean of the abbey from 1999 to 2005.

== Notes ==
Church of England titles
Preceded by Edward Knapp-Fisher	Archdeacon of Westminster; 1999–2005	Succeeded by Jane Hedges
