= David Edwards (priest) =

Anglican priest (1929–2018)

The Very Reverend David Edwards OBE
- Provost of Southwark
- Church: Church of England
- Diocese: Diocese of Southwark
- Other posts: Dean of Norwich (1978–83); Sub-Dean of Westminster Abbey (1974–78); Chaplain to the Speaker of the House of Commons (1972–78); Dean of King's College, Cambridge (1966–70)

Orders
- Ordination: 1954 (deacon); 1955 (priest)

Personal details
- Born: David Lawrence Edwards; 20 January 1929 Cairo, Egypt
- Died: 25 April 2018 (aged 89) Winchester, England
- Residence: Anglicanism
- Education: King's School, Canterbury
- Alma mater: Magdalen College, Oxford; Westcott House, Cambridge

David Lawrence Edwards OBE (20 January 1929 – 25 April 2018) was an Anglican priest, scholar and church historian. He served as the Dean of Norwich, Chaplain to the Speaker of the House of Commons, Sub-Dean at Westminster Abbey and Provost of Southwark, and was a prolific author.

== Education ==
Edwards was born in Cairo, where his father was an inspector of schools. He was educated at The King's School, Canterbury, and Magdalen College, Oxford, where he took a BA in 1952 and MA in 1956.

== Academic career and ministry ==
Edwards was elected a Fellow of All Souls College, Oxford, for a seven-year period from 1952 to 1959. He spent the academic year of 1953–54 studying at Westcott House, Cambridge, and was ordained deacon in 1954. He served as a tutor at Westcott House (1954–55) and he was ordained priest in 1955.

In 1955 Edwards began his ordained ministry as an assistant curate at St John's, Hampstead, and also began his work with the Student Christian Movement as its secretary, remaining in both positions until 1958.

Edwards was assistant curate of St Martin-in-the-Fields (1958–66), editor for the Student Christian Movement Press (1959–66) and General Secretary of the Student Christian Movement (1965–66).

From 1966 until 1970, Edwards was the Dean of King's College, Cambridge. He was also a Six Preacher of Canterbury Cathedral (1969–76).

Edwards was a canon of Westminster Abbey and the rector of St Margaret's, Westminster (1970–78). He was additionally Chaplain to the Speaker of the House of Commons (1972–78) and Sub-Dean of Westminster Abbey (1974–78). He was Chairman of the Churches' Council on Gambling (1970–78) and of Christian Aid (1971–78). He was the Dean of Norwich from 1978 to 1983 and the Provost of Southwark from 1983 to 1994.

Edwards was for many years the principal reviewer and leader writer for the Church Times.

Edwards retired to Winchester, becoming an honorary chaplain at Winchester Cathedral in 1995. He died on 25 April 2018.

== Honours ==
In 1990 the Archbishop of Canterbury, Robert Runcie, conferred upon Edwards the Lambeth degree of Doctor of Divinity. He wore the academic dress of his former headmaster, Fred Shirley, (who had himself been a Doctor of Divinity) and of whom Edwards wrote a biography, F. J. Shirley: An Extraordinary Headmaster (1969).

Also in 1990, he was appointed an honorary fellow of the South Bank Polytechnic (later South Bank University and now called London South Bank University).

In the 1995 New Year Honours, Queen Elizabeth II appointed him an Officer of the Order of the British Empire "for services to the Church of England."

== Writings ==
Edwards wrote more than 60 books, including:

- Christian England (London: Collins, 1981–84; Fount, 1982–85)
  - vol. 1: Its story to the Reformation
  - vol. 2: From the Reformation to the 18th century
  - vol. 3: From the 18th century to the First World War

The most recent include:

- Roger Bowen with David L. Edwards et al, A guide to preaching (SPCK International Study Guide 38, London : SPCK, 2005)
- Poets and God: Chaucer, Shakespeare, Herbert, Milton, Wordsworth, Coleridge, Blake (London: Darton Longman & Todd, 2005)
- What Anglicans believe in the twenty-first century (London: Continuum, 2000, new expanded edn 2002, updated edn 2004)
- The Church that could be (London: SPCK, 2002)
- After death?: past beliefs and real possibilities (London: Continuum, 1999, new edn 2001)
- A concise history of English Christianity: from Roman Britain to the present day (London: Fount, 1998)
- The great Christian centuries to come (Durham: St Mary's College, University of Durham, 1998)
- Christianity: the first two thousand years (London: Cassell, 1997)
- What is Catholicism? An Anglican responds to the official teaching of the Roman Catholic Church (London: Mowbray, 1994)

Church of England titles
Preceded by Thomas Nevill	Chaplain to the Speaker of the House of Commons; 1972–1978	Succeeded by John Baker
