= Thomas Nevill (priest) =

English Anglican priest and school teacher

Thomas Seymour Nevill (30 October 1901 – 17 August 1980) was an English Anglican priest and school teacher. He was Headmaster of Wellingborough School from 1940 to 1956, Master of Charterhouse from 1962 to 1973, and Chaplain to the Speaker of the House of Commons from November 1969 to 1972.

Church of England titles
| Preceded by Michael Stancliffe | Chaplain to the Speaker of the House of Commons; 1969 to 1972 | Succeeded by David Edwards |
