= Dick Palmer =

Dick Palmer may refer to:

- Dick Palmer (American football) (born 1947), American former linebacker
- Dick Palmer (broadcaster), American radio broadcaster
- Dick Palmer (1928–2016), Italian actor whose birthname was Mimmo Palmara

== See also ==
- Richard Palmer (disambiguation)
