= Peter Birch (priest) =

English clergyman

Peter Birch (c. 1652 – 2 July 1710) was an English clergyman who served as Chaplain to the Speaker of the House of Commons and Archdeacon of Westminster.

Birch was the son of Thomas Birch MP of Birch Hall, Manchester, and his wife Alice née Brooke. Raised a presbyterian, he was admitted to Emmanuel College, Cambridge in 1667, and also studied in Oxford, though not initially as a member of the university. (Under the Test Act, he could not graduate at Cambridge or matriculate at Oxford without conforming to the Church of England.) Having declared his conformity to the established church, he was admitted to Christ Church, Oxford by John Fell, Dean of Christ Church, matriculating on 12 May 1673, aged 21. He graduated B.A. March 1674, M.A. June 1674, B.D. 1684, D.D. 1688, and was made a chaplain of Christ Church by Dr. Fell.

For a time he was curate of St Thomas the Martyr's Church, Oxford, then rector of St Ebbe's Church, Oxford and lecturer at Carfax, and subsequently chaplain to James, Duke of Ormonde. He became Chaplain to the House of Commons and a prebendary of Westminster Abbey in 1689. He later became Sub-Dean and Archdeacon of Westminster.

When Thomas Tenison, rector of St James's Church, Piccadilly was appointed Bishop of Lincoln, the Bishop of London claimed the right to appoint to St. James's, appointing Birch on 11 July 1692. Queen Mary II, being satisfied that St. James's was a crown appointment, appointed William Wake. These conflicting claims led to litigation between Birch and Wake in the court of king's bench, and eventually the House of Lords decided the case on appeal, on 12 January 1695, in Wake's favour. According to Abel Boyer, Birch, a "great stickler for the high-church party", was probably ousted from St. James's after offending the court by preaching an unsuitable sermon on King William III's birthday. Shortly afterwards, on 19 March 1695, Birch was presented by the dean and chapter of Westminster to the vicarage of St Bride's Church, Fleet Street.

Birch was married three times: firstly in 1686 to Mary (died 1688), daughter of the poet Edmund Waller; secondly in 1697 to Martha (died 1703), daughter of Samuel Vyner and widow of Francis Millington; thirdly to Sybil (died 1708), daughter of Humphrey Wyrley. With his third wife he had two sons, Humphrey Birch and John Wyrley Birch.

He died on 2 July 1710, and was buried in Westminster Abbey.
