= Robert Wright (priest, born 1949) =

Retired Church of England priest

The Reverend Canon Robert Wright LVO
- Chaplain to the Speaker of the House of Commons
- Church: Church of England
- See: Royal Peculiar
- In office: 1998 to 2010
- Predecessor: Donald Gray
- Successor: Rose Hudson-Wilkin
- Other posts: Canon of Westminster Abbey (1998–2010); Sub-Dean of Westminster Abbey (2005–2010); Archdeacon of Westminster (2009–2010)

Orders
- Ordination: 1973 (deacon); 1974 (priest)

Personal details
- Born: Anthony Robert Wright; 1949 (age 76–77)
- Education: Lanchester Polytechnic; St Stephen's House, Oxford

Anthony Robert Wright, LVO (born 1949) is a retired Church of England priest. He served as Chaplain to the Speaker of the House of Commons from 1998 to 2010. From 2005 to 2010, he was also Sub-Dean and a canon of Westminster Abbey, and Archdeacon of Westminster. In 2010, he retired and was appointed canon emeritus.

== Early life and education ==
Wright was born in 1949. He studied Modern Studies at Lanchester Polytechnic in Coventry, and graduated with a Bachelor of Arts (BA) degree in 1970. In 1970, he entered St Stephen's House, Oxford, an Anglo-Catholic theological college, to train for ordination. During this time, he also studied theology at the University of Oxford, and completed a Certificate in Theology (CTh).

== Ordained ministry ==
Wright was ordained in the Church of England as a deacon in 1973 and as a priest in 1974. From 1973 to 1976, he served his curacy at St Michael and All Angels, Amersham-on-the-Hill in the Diocese of Oxford. He served as further curacy at St Giles' Church, Reading between 1976 and 1978. From 1978 to 1984, he served as priest-in-charge of Holy Trinity Church, Prestwood. He was then the incumbent of St Peter and St Paul's Church, Wantage: first as priest-in-charge (1978–1984) and then as vicar (1987–1992). He was also Rural Dean of Wantage between 1984 and 1992.

In 1992, Wright moved from the Diocese of Oxford to the Diocese of Portsmouth. From 1992 to 1998, he was Vicar of Portsea (a parish that includes St Mary's Church, Portsea). In 1996, he was made an honorary canon of Portsmouth Cathedral.

From 1998 to 2010, Wright served as Chaplain to the Speaker of the House of Commons and Rector of St Margaret's Church, Westminster. He was additionally a canon of Westminster Abbey from 1998, Sub-Dean of the Abbey from 2005 to 2010, and Archdeacon of Westminster from 2009 to 2010.

In September 2010, Wright retired from full-time ministry and was appointed canon emeritus. Since 2011, he has held Permission to Officiate in the Diocese of Oxford.

== Personal life ==
In 1970, Wright married Leah Helen Flower. Together they had one son and one daughter.

== Honours ==
In the 2010 Queen's Birthday Honours, Wright was appointed a Lieutenant of the Royal Victorian Order (LVO).

Church of England titles
Preceded by Donald Gray	Chaplain to the Speaker of the House of Commons; 1998–2010	Succeeded by Rose Hudson-Wilkin
