= Tricia Hillas =

Chaplain to the Speaker of the House of Commons

The Right Reverend Tricia Hillas
- Bishop of Sodor and Man
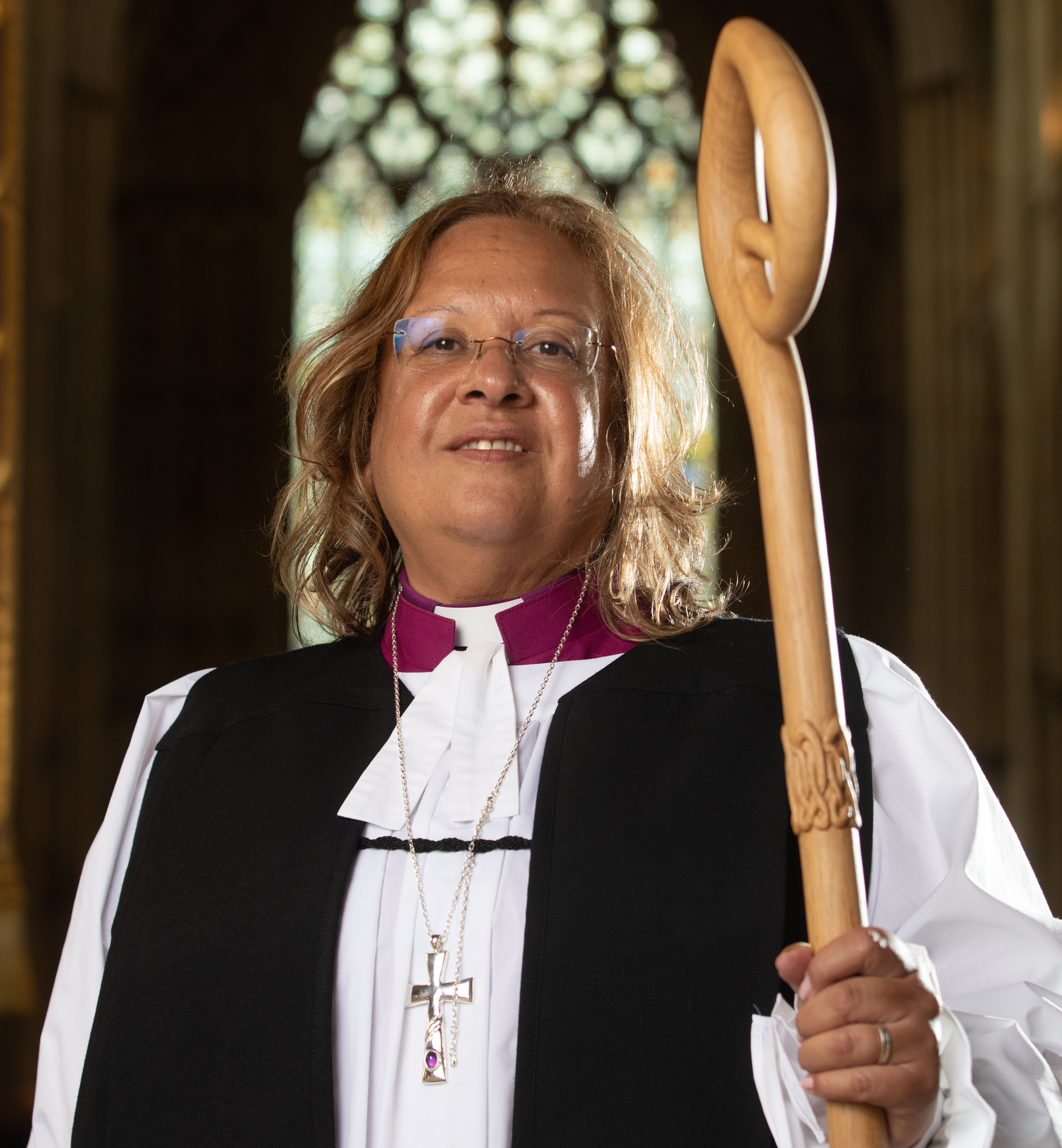
- Hillas in 2024
- Diocese: Diocese of Sodor and Man
- In office: September 2024 to present
- Predecessor: Peter Eagles
- Previous posts: Canon Steward and Archdeacon of Westminster (2021–2024); Chaplain to the Speaker of the House of Commons (2020–2024); Priest-in-Charge of St Mary-at-Hill (2019–2021); Canon Pastor at St Paul's Cathedral (2014–2019)

Orders
- Ordination: 2002 (deacon); 2003 (priest)
- Consecration: 10 October 2024 by Stephen Cottrell

Personal details
- Born: 1966 (age 59–60) Kuala Lumpur, Malaysia

Patricia Dorothy Hillas (called Tricia; born 1966) is a Church of England bishop. She served as Chaplain to the Speaker of the House of Commons from 2020 and a Canon of Westminster from 2021. Since 2024, she has been Bishop of Sodor and Man, becoming the see's first female bishop in its 1500-year history.

== Early life and education ==
Hillas was born in 1966 in Kuala Lumpur, Malaysia, to an Indian mother and a British father. She moved to the UK with her family in 1971. She trained as a social worker, and worked as a youth and social worker specialising in supporting those diagnosed with HIV and AIDS. She also studied at Birkbeck College, University of London and the University of East London, graduating with a Bachelor of Science (BSc) degree in 1991. From 1998 to 2002, she trained for ordination on the North Thames Ministerial Training Course and studied at Middlesex University, graduating with a Bachelor of Arts (BA) degree. She completed a Master of Science (MSc) degree in conflict resolution and mediation in 2021.

== Ordained ministry ==
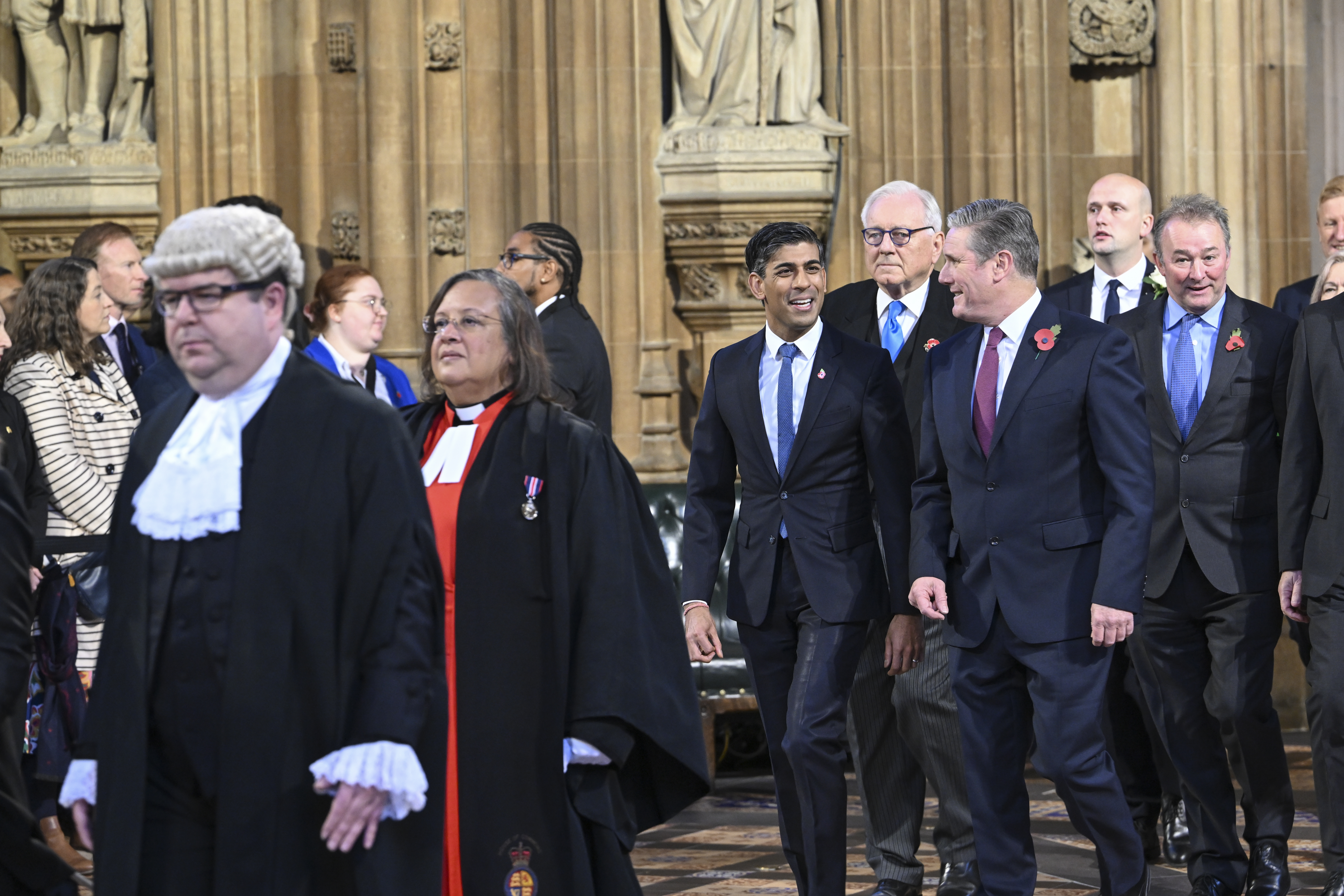
Hillas in procession during the State Opening of Parliament, 2023

Hillas was ordained deacon in 2002 and priest in 2003. She served her curacy (2002 to 2005) at the Kensal Rise Team Ministry. From 2005 to 2014 she was vicar of St Barnabas Northolt Park. From 2014 until 2020 she was Canon Pastor at St Paul's Cathedral. Ahead of the service marking the Grenfell Tower fire, Hillas was part of a team supporting the families of victims.

In October 2019, Hillas was announced as the next Chaplain to the Speaker of the House of Commons. She took up the post in February 2020, and was inaugurated during a service in St Margaret's Church, Westminster on 4 March 2020. In 2020, she was appointed as the Priest-in-Charge of St Mary-at-Hill, City of London: she resigned the parish post when she was appointed to her canonry.

Remaining Speaker's Chaplain, Hillas was installed as a Canon of Westminster on 9 May 2021; she became Canon Steward and Archdeacon of Westminster shortly afterwards (before 31 May 2021). In that role, she took part in the 2023 Coronation.

On 13 May 2021, she led a short service to commemorate the 80th anniversary of the bombing of Parliament in World War II.

=== Episcopal ministry ===
On 16 May 2024, she was announced as the next Bishop of Sodor and Man, the only bishop of the Diocese of Sodor and Man and an ex officio member of the Legislative Council of the Isle of Man. She was formally appointed via letters patent on 23 September 2024. On 10 October 2024, she was consecrated as a bishop by Stephen Cottrell, Archbishop of York, during a service at York Minster. On 16 November 2024, she was enthroned as the 88th Bishop of Sodor and Man at Peel Cathedral.

== Personal life ==
Hillas was married to Andrew Hillas, who was head of the youth offending service for the London Borough of Southwark before his death on 10 June 2025..
