= Epitoge =

An epitoge is a garment worn over the left shoulder that sometimes forms part of academic or court dress.

== Background ==
The epitoge is descended from the chaperon, a mediaeval hat that descended from a cloak with a hood with the head tucked into the opening of the cowl, so that the long tail or liripipe and the abbreviated cape hung at opposite sides of the head (wearer's right and wearer's left respectively). Over time, the cape portion was reduced to a small pleated flap and the cowl was curled up into a roundel, and it then became the practice to wear the garment over the left shoulder rather than on the head, with the narrow liripipe in front and the wider cape behind.

The garment is commonly used in French universities, where bands of ermine trimming are used to indicate the degree (one band for a bachelor, two for a master, and three for a doctor). In the United Kingdom and Ireland, the garment is more commonly used to indicate diplomas rather than degrees; the Irish variant of the epitoge omits the roundel and has a plain cape rather than pleated. Versions of epitoge are also used by some orders of chivalry and on barristers' gowns in some legal systems.

== Gallery ==
Examples of epitoges
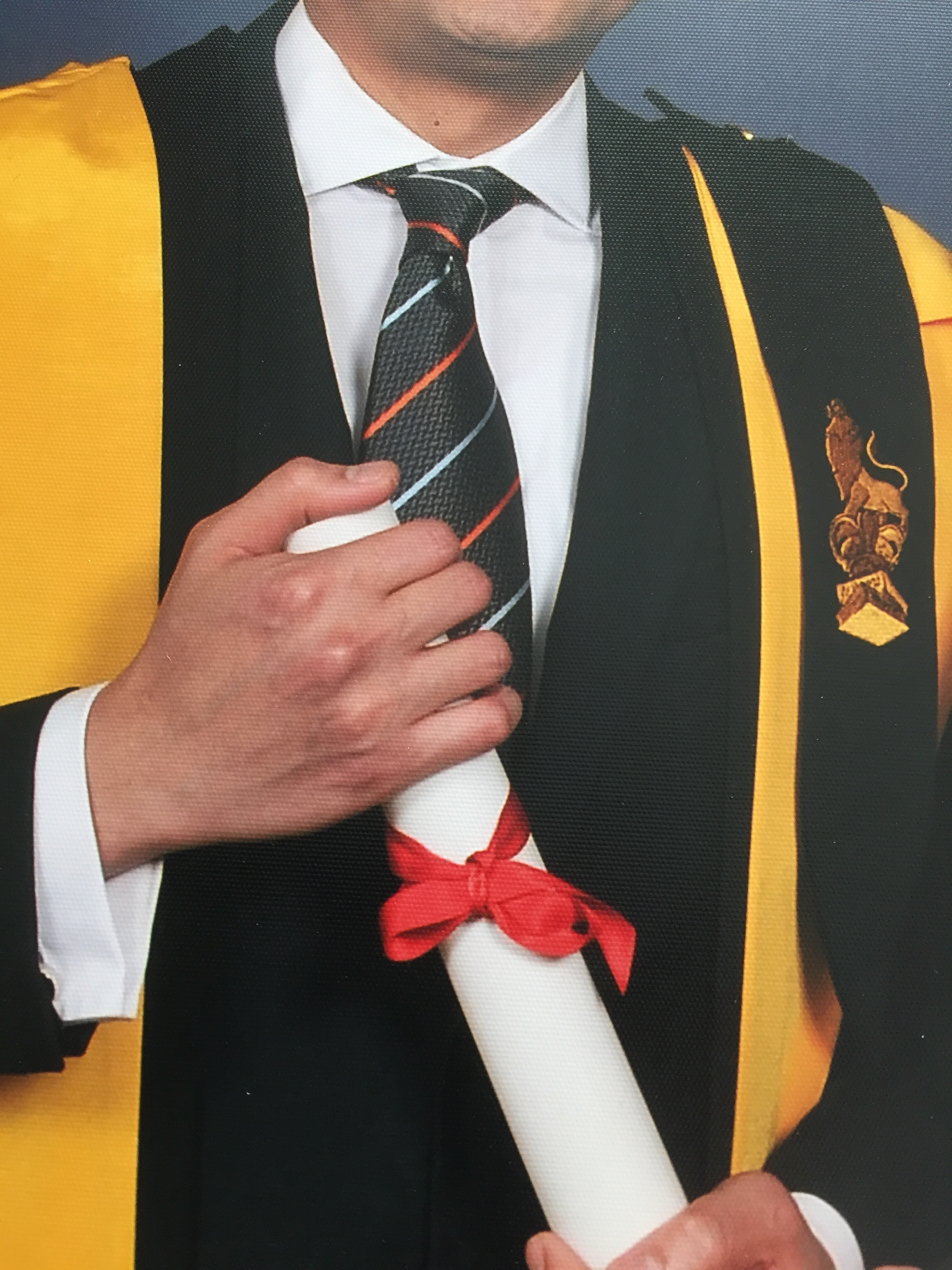
A black AKC epitoge on the left shoulder with gold lion embroidery, accompanying the academic dress of King's College London

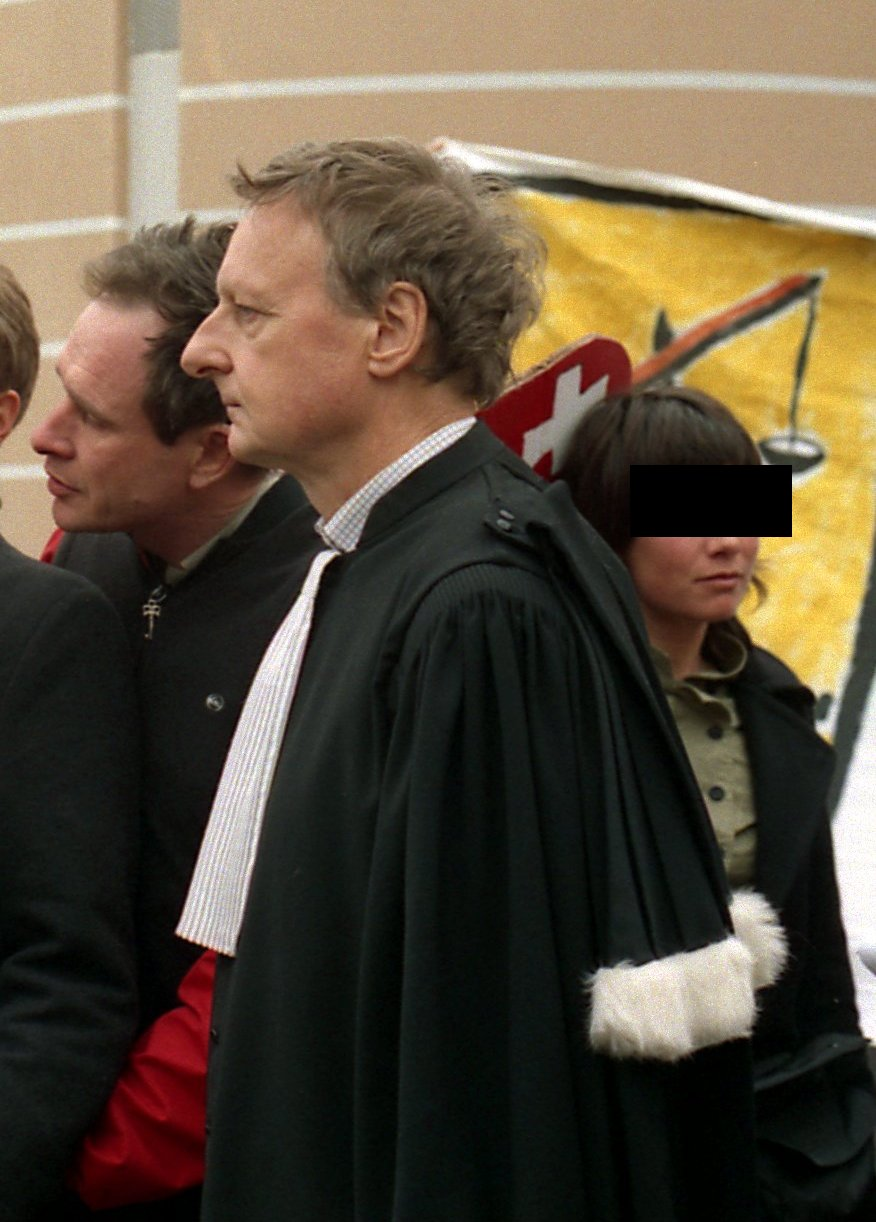
A Swiss barrister wearing an epitoge (in this case, both the liripipe and the cape are hanging behind the shoulder)

== See also ==
- Academic dress
- Graduation ceremony

== Bibliography ==
- Groves, Nicholas, ed. (2011). Shaw's Academical Dress of Great Britain and Ireland (3rd ed.). Oxford: The Burgon Society. ISBN 978-0-95612723-5.
