= Stephen Marriott =

Anglican priest

Stephen Jack Marriott (8 November 1886 – 25 December 1964) was an Anglican priest who was Archdeacon of Westminster from 1946 to 1951.

Donaldson was educated at Christ's College, Cambridge and ordained in 1913. He served curacies in Southport, Rye Park and Folkestone. He was a temporary Naval Chaplain and RAF from 1917 to 1918. He served incumbencies at South Queensferry and North Berwick. In 1937 he became a Canon of Westminster.

Church of England titles
Preceded by Frederic Donaldson	Archdeacon of Westminster; 1946–1951	Succeeded by Adam Fox
