= Scawen Kenrick =

English clergyman

Scawen Kenrick (3 June 1694 – 2 May 1753) was an English clergyman who served as Chaplain to the Speaker of the House of Commons and Archdeacon of Westminster.

== Life ==
Kenrick was the son of John Kenrick, a London merchant.

He was educated at Merchant Taylors' School, London and Corpus Christi College, Cambridge, matriculating in 1714, graduating B.A. 1717, M.A. 1720, D.D. (comitia regia) 1728. He was ordained deacon on 21 September 1718 and priest on 13 March 1720.

Kenrick held the following positions in the church:

- Vicar of Stone, Buckinghamshire, 1720
- Rector of Hambleden, Buckinghamshire, 1722–53
- Chaplain to the House of Commons, 1728
- Prebendary of Westminster Abbey, 1729–53 (also Sub-Dean and Archdeacon)
- Rector of St Margaret's, Westminster, 1734–53

Kenrick died on 2 May 1753, and was buried in Hambleden churchyard.

On 13 May, John Butler preached his funeral sermon at St Margaret's, Westminster, The Man Without Guile after John 1:47.
