= Frederick Donaldson (priest) =

English Anglican priest (1860–1953)

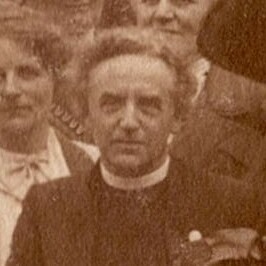
- Donaldson at a Church League for Women's Suffrage meeting in Brighton in 1913
- Born: Frederick Lewis Donaldson; 10 September 1860; Ladywood
- Died: 7 October 1953 (aged 93); Westminster
- Occupation: Priest
- Spouse: Louise Eagleston (m. 1886)

Frederick Lewis Donaldson (10 September 1860 – 7 October 1953) was an English Anglican priest, most notably Archdeacon of Westminster from 1937 to 1946.

== Life ==
Donaldson was born in Ladywood, Birmingham, England on 10 September 1860 and educated at Christ Church Cathedral School and Merton College, Oxford, graduating B.A. in 1884. He was ordained Deacon in 1884; and Priest in 1885. While Curate at St Nicholas Cole Abbey he married Louise Eagleston: they had two sons and four daughters. After further curacies in Piccadilly Circus and Hammersmith he was appointed Rector of Nailstone. He was Vicar of St Mark's Church, Leicester from 1896 to 1918; and then of Paston until 1924. He was a Canon of Westminster from 1924 to 1951; Sub-Dean, 1944–1951, Steward, 1927–1931, Treasurer, 1931–1951, and Receiver-General, 1938–1951.

Donaldson was a founder member of the Church Socialist League, and chaired the organisation from 1913 until 1916. He was also an early member of the Christian Social Union, sat on the council of the Industrial Christian Fellowship. He was a leader of a march of unemployed workers from Leicester to London, in 1905. In 1913, Donaldson led a deputation of Church of England clergy to the prime minister, H. H. Asquith, demanding women's suffrage. Being passionate about world peace, he was the president of the London Council for the Prevention of War (1927) and chairman of the League of Clergy for Peace (1931–40).

On 1 April 1925, Donaldson in an address as Canon of Westminster Abbey, listed his "seven social evils" as:

1. Politics without principle.
2. Wealth without work.
3. Pleasure without conscience.
4. Knowledge without character.
5. Commerce and industry without morality.
6. Science without humanity.
7. Worship without sacrifice.

This list was sent to Mahatma Gandhi, who published a similar version in his weekly newspaper Young India on 22 October 1925.

== Animal welfare ==
Donaldson was an opponent of blood sports. In 1927, he was a member of the League for the Prohibition of Cruel Sports Advisory Committee. He was also a vice-president of the League.

== Death ==
Donaldson died in Westminster on 7 October 1953.

Church of England titles
Preceded by Vernon Storr	Archdeacon of Westminster; 1937–1946	Succeeded by Stephen Marriott
