= Edward Voyce =

English clergyman

Edward Voyce (April 1633 – 31 March 1713) was an English clergyman. In 1660 he was appointed Chaplain to the Speaker of the House of Commons, the first person to receive this title explicitly.

Voyce was the son of Edward Voyce, Rector of West Stow, Suffolk. He was educated at King Edward VI School, Bury St Edmunds and Corpus Christi College, Cambridge, matriculating at Easter 1651, graduating B.A. 1655, M.A. 1658. He was ordained priest by Ralph Brownrigg, Bishop of Exeter on 22 November 1658.

In 1660, Voyce was appointed Chaplain to the House of Commons by the Convention Parliament. On 27 December 1660, two days before that parliament's dissolution on 29 December, the House voted to pay the chaplain £120 "for his pains and diligent service in constant praying with this House, every morning, since the beginning of this Parliament".

He became Rector of Oakley, Suffolk (1661) and Vicar of Hindolveston, Norfolk (1662–63).

Voyce died on 31 March 1713, aged 79 years and 11 months, and is buried in the churchyard at Oakley.
