= William Hartley Carnegie =

English Anglican priest and author

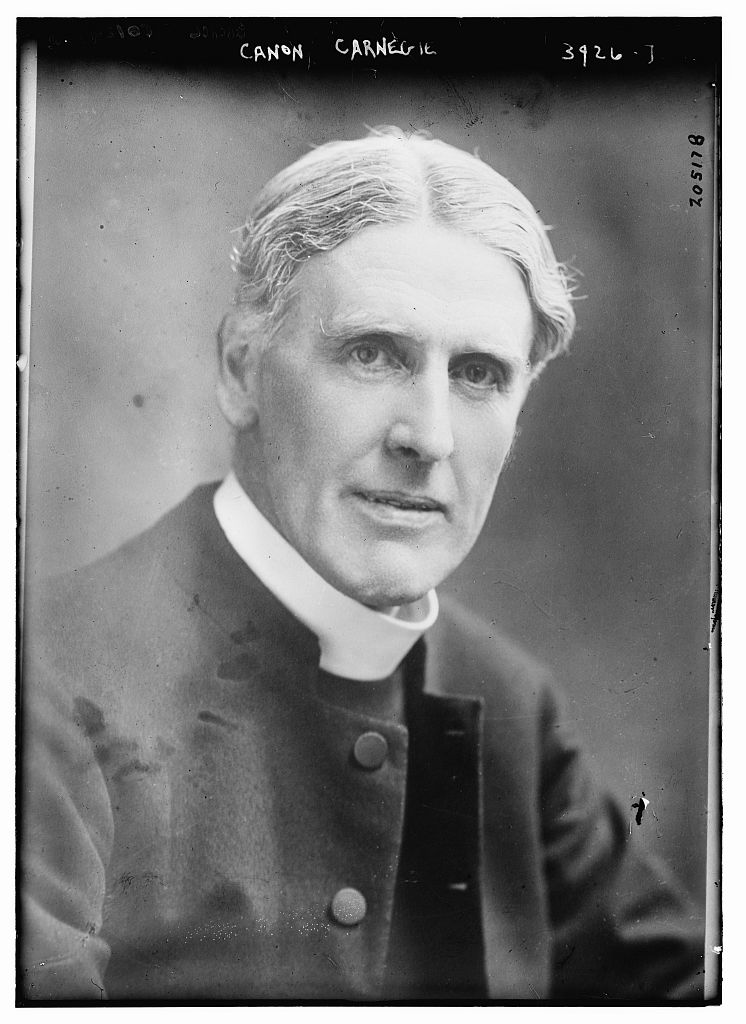
Carnegie in 1916

William Hartley Carnegie (27 February 1859 – 18 October 1936) was an Anglican priest and author. In addition to parish ministries and chaplaincy, he served as Archdeacon of Westminster from 1918 to 1919 and as sub-dean of Westminster Abbey from 1919 to 1936.

== Early life and education ==
Carnegie was born on 27 February 1859, and educated at Magdalen College, Oxford, where he matriculated in 1878, and graduated B.A. in 1884. He then spent two years travelling round the world, yachting and shooting.

== Ordained ministry ==
Carnegie was ordained in 1888; and then worked as Curate in Pudsey. He was Rector of Great Witley from 1889 to 1903; and of the Cathedral Church of St Philip, Birmingham. He became Rector of St Margaret's, Westminster in 1912, Chaplain to the Speaker of the House of Commons in 1916, and Sub-Dean of Westminster Abbey in 1919. He was also Archdeacon of Westminster between 1918 and 1919. He held the three posts until his death on 18 October 1936.

== Family ==
Carnegie married on 15 June 1892 Albinia Frances Crawley-Boevey, daughter of Sir Thomas Hyde Crawley-Boevey, 5th Baronet of Flaxley Abbey and Frances Elizabeth Peters. The couple had five daughters, Frances, Mary Albinia, Kathleen, Jocosa, and Rachel Elizabeth. His first wife died at the Great Witley rectory on 12 May 1902, only seven months after the birth of their youngest daughter.

He remarried Mary Endicott in 1916. She was the widow of politician Joseph Chamberlain (1836–1914).

== Death ==
Carnegie died on 18 October 1936. His ashes were interred in the nave of Westminster Abbey.

== Works ==
- Through Conversion to the Creed: Being a Brief Account of the Reasonable Character of Religious Conviction. (1893)
- Some Principles of Religious Education. (1896)
- Faith and Reason. Three Addresses. (1904)
- Churchmanship and Character. (1909)
- Why and What I Believe in Christianity. (1910)
- Democracy and Christian Doctrine. (1914)
- Resentment: Three Sermons. (1916)
- Democracy and Personal Leadership. (1918)
- Personal Religion and Politics. (1920)
- Anglicanism: An Introduction to Its History and Philosophy. (1925)
- Parliament and the Prayer Book. (1928)
