= Andrew Hillier =

British priest (born 1968)

The Venerable Andrew Hillier KHC
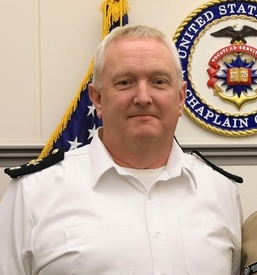
- Hillier in 2023
- Born: 5 June 1968 (age 58)
- Allegiance: United Kingdom
- Branch: Royal Navy
- Service years: 2005 to 2025
- Spouse: Louise Gomm
- Children: 3

Andrew Hillier (born 5 June 1968) is a British Anglican priest and military chaplain. He is currently the Chaplain to the Speaker of the House of Commons. He was previously Chaplain of the Fleet and Archdeacon for the Royal Navy.

== Early life and career ==
Hillier was born on 5 June 1968 in Bournemouth. He was educated at Foster's School, Somerset School of Nursing and Cardiff University. He was a staff nurse at Musgrove Park Hospital, Taunton from 1992 to 2002.

== Ordained ministry ==
His ordination training took place via the South West Ministry Training Course. He was ordained deacon in 2002 and priest in 2003. Hillier began his career with a curacy in Castle Cary. He joined the Royal Navy in 2005. He was made an honorary chaplain to the King (KHC) in 2022, and an honorary canon of Portsmouth Cathedral on 14 May 2023. He retired as a naval chaplain in 2025.

Based in the Diocese of Bath and Wells, he was Lead Chaplain at Hinkley Point C between November 2025 and February 2026. In February 2026 he became Chaplain to the Speaker of the House of Commons.

== Personal life ==
Hillier married Louise Gomm in 2022: he has one daughter.
