= A. Richard Palmer =

Marine biologist

A. Richard Palmer (also known as Richard Palmer) is a marine biologist at the University of Alberta. Among other topics, he has written extensively on morphological asymmetry. In 2007, he was elected as a fellow of the Royal Society of Canada.
