= Edward Knapp-Fisher =

Anglican bishop and scholar (1915–2003)

The Right Reverend Edward Knapp-Fisher
- Bishop of Pretoria
- Church: Anglican Church of Southern Africa
- In office: 1960 to 1975

Orders
- Ordination: 1939 (deacon); 1940 (priest)
- Consecration: c. 1960

Personal details
- Born: 8 January 1915 Chatham, Kent, England
- Died: 7 February 2003 (aged 88) Chichester, West Sussex, UK

Edward George Knapp-Fisher (8 January 1915 – 7 February 2003) was an Anglican bishop and scholar.

== Life ==
Knapp-Fisher was born in Chatham, Kent, United Kingdom. His father was also an Anglican priest.

He was educated at The King's School, Worcester, and at Trinity College, Oxford, where he took a First in Jurisprudence in 1936 (MA 1940). In 1938 he entered Wells Theological College and he was ordained deacon in 1939 and priest in 1940.

He was assistant curate of Brighouse (1940–42) before entering the Royal Naval Volunteer Reserve as a chaplain and serving in the Far East. In 1946 he was appointed chaplain of Cuddesdon College and he was briefly a member of the Oratory of the Good Shepherd. He spent the period 1949–52 as chaplain of St John's College, Cambridge (Cambridge MA 1949) and then he returned to Cuddesdon as principal from 1952 until 1960.(Johnson 2013, p. 174) He was noted for his imposition of a strictly disciplined lifestyle on his students. He particularly emphasised the 'custody of time'(Tustin 2013, p. 87) Later on Knapp-Fisher found that the 'custody of time' needed to be interpreted differently in South Africa. As well as being the principal of the theological college at Cuddesdon he was also vicar of the Church of All Saints, Cuddesdon and he served as rural dean 1958–60.

In 1960 he went to South Africa, where he had been elected Bishop of Pretoria (he had been offered the post several times before eventually taking it up). He was instrumental in the founding of St Alban's College in 1963. In 1967 he was appointed to the Anglican-Roman Catholic Joint Preparatory Commission, and in 1969 to the International Commission (ARCIC) itself, on which he served until 1981. Like other bishops of that time in South Africa, Knapp-Fisher was critical of Apartheid.(Van den Berghe 1967, p. 193)(Hastings 1979, p. 208)

He came back to England in 1975 when he was appointed Canon Residentiary of Westminster Abbey and Archdeacon of Westminster, serving as sub-dean of the Abbey from 1982 until his retirement in 1987.(Mayne 2011, p. 123) He was installed as Canon on 26 July 1975. His sub-deanship coincided with a long vacancy in the deanery itself and he was therefore responsible for organising the wedding of Prince Andrew and Sarah Ferguson on 23 July 1986. He was also an Assistant Bishop in the Diocese of Southwark (August 1975 – 1987) and Diocese of London (1976–1986).

He retired to Chichester where he was an honorary assistant bishop in the Diocese of Chichester and Custos of St Mary's Hospital.

He was a member of The Ecumenical Society of the Blessed Virgin Mary.(McLoughlin & Pinnock 2007, p. xvi)

He died in February 2003 at the age of 88. He was survived by his wife Joan Bradley whom he met in South Africa.

== Published works ==
- The Churchman's Heritage: A Study in the Ethos of the English Church. Adam & Charles Black. 1952.
- Belief and Prayer. Darton, Longman & Todd. 1964.
- Where the Truth Is Found: Some Reflections on the Way of the World. Collins. 1975. ISBN 978-0-00-623830-0.
- Eucharist: Many Sided Mystery. Ronald P Frye & Company. 1988. ISBN 978-1-85093-100-3.
- The Ecumenical Society of the Blessed Virgin Mary Yesterday, Today and Tomorrow. Ecumenical Society of the Blessed Virgin Mary. 1998. ISBN 978-1-869927-27-1.
- Michael Watts, ed. (1993). "XII Implications for the Church". Through a Glass Darkly: A Crisis Considered. Gracewing Publishing. ISBN 978-0-85244-240-1.

Anglican Church of Southern Africa titles
Preceded by Robert Selby Taylor	Bishop of Pretoria; 1963–1975	Succeeded by Michael Nuttall
