= Richard Palmer (priest) =

English clergyman

Richard Palmer (c. 1714 – 7 May 1805) was an English clergyman who served as Chaplain to the Speaker of the House of Commons.

Palmer was the son of Henry Palmer, a clerk in Lincolnshire. He was educated at Jesus College, Cambridge, matriculating in 1732, graduating B.A. 1736, M.A. 1766. He later received the Lambeth degree of D.D.

Ordained deacon in 1737 and priest in 1740, Palmer served as Rector of Scott Willoughby, Lincolnshire (1740), Chaplain to the House of Commons (1765–1769), Prebendary of Canterbury Cathedral (1769–1781), and Rector of St Swithin, London Stone (1776–1805).

He died in Grantham, Lincolnshire on 7 May 1805, aged 91.
