= Archdeacon of Westminster =

Church of England ecclesiastical office

The Archdeacon of Westminster is a senior ecclesiastical officer within the Chapter of the Royal Peculiar of Westminster Abbey in London. The holder of the post oversees relationships with the twenty-four parishes of which the Dean and Chapter are patrons, and is responsible for the pastoral care of the staff and volunteers of the Abbey.

The post was most recently held by Tricia Hillas then Anthony Ball. In December 2025, it was announced that the next archdeacon would be Jennifer Adams-Massmann. The role of archdeacon has previously been held together with other chapter roles, including Sub-Dean, Canon Treasurer, and Canon Theologian.

== List of archdeacons ==
Richard Widmore lists the following as Archdeacons of Westminster, acknowledging the incompleteness of the list:

- Richard Crokesley (elected abbot 1246)
- Thomas (1258)
- A. de Wycomb (1277–1288)
- Roger Bures (before 1293)
- William de Huntyngdon (1292)
- Alexander de Pershore (1312)
- Robert (1324–1327)
- William de Ipswich (1360–1370)
- Thomas Pyk (1372–1373)
- William de Colchester (1382, elected abbot 1386)
- John Stowe (1388)
- John Burwell (1391–1394)
- William Agmondesham (1414)
- William Wycombe (1467)
- William Borogh (1498–1500)
- Andrew Perne (1554)
- John Hardyman (1560, deprived)
- William Latymer (1561–1572)
- Richard Reve (1573–1580)
- Richard Hakluyt (1603–1604)
- Christopher Sutton (1609–1617)
- Gabriel Grante (1617–1630)
- Thomas Mountford (1631)

At Widmore's time of writing (1751), the present archdeacon was Scawen Kenrick.

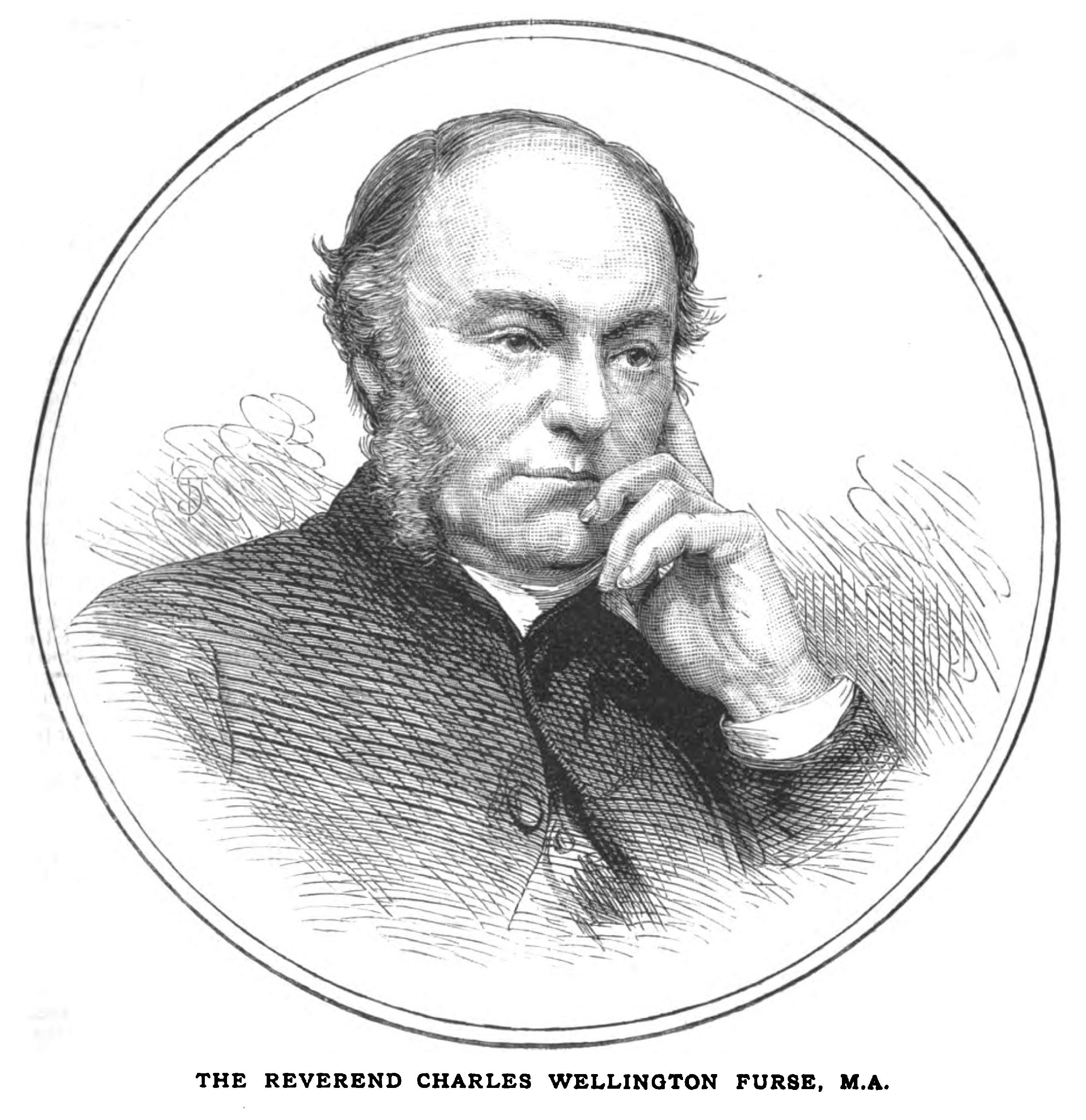
Charles Wellington Furse

- 1854–1864 (res.): William Bentinck (Rector of Sigglesthorne 1808; canon 1809–1864)
- 1864–1868 (res.): Christopher Wordsworth (canon 1844–1869; later Bishop of Lincoln)
- 1868–1883: John Jennings (canon 1837–1883)
- 1883–1894 (res.): Frederick Farrar (canon 1876–1895; Speaker's Chaplain from 1890; later Dean of Canterbury)
- 1894–1900: Charles Furse (father of artist Charles Wellington Furse)
- 1900–13 May 1916 (d.): Basil Wilberforce, Speaker's Chaplain (canon since 1894)
- 1916–1918: Ernest Pearce (canon 1911–1919; became Sub-Dean)
- 1918–1919: William Hartley Carnegie, Speaker's Chaplain (canon 1913–1936; became Sub-Dean)
- 1919–30 January 1931 (d.): Robert Charles (canon since 1913)
- 1931–December 1936 (res.): Vernon Storr (canon since 1921)
- 1937–?: Frederic Donaldson (canon 1921–1951)
- 1946–1951 (res.): Stephen Marriott (canon since 1937; became Sub-Dean)
- Adam Fox (canon 1941–1964)
- 1959–1964 (ret.): Stephen Marriott (again; canon since 1937)
- 1963–1974 (res.): Edward Carpenter (canon since 1951; became Dean of Westminster)
- 1974–1 September 1975 (res.): Ronald Jasper (canon since 1968)
- 1975–1987 (ret.): Edward Knapp-Fisher (Sub-Dean from 1982)
- 1987-1999 (ret.): Anthony Harvey, Sub-Dean
- 1999–2005 (ret.): David Hutt, Sub-Dean (canon since 1995)
- 2006–2010 (res.): Jane Hedges, Canon Steward (canon until 2014)
- 2009–2010 (ret.): Robert Wright, Sub-Dean, Rector of St Margaret's & Speaker's Chaplain (canon since 1998)
- 2010–21 June 2014 (res.): Jane Hedges, Canon Steward (again; canon since 2006; Sub-Dean since 2013)
- 2014–17 July 2016 (res.): Andrew Tremlett (Note: Tremlett was appointed Sub-Dean and Archdeacon between 6 July and 3 August 2014.), Sub-Dean and Rector of St Margaret's (canon since 2010)
- 2016–2018 (ret.): Vernon White, Sub-Dean (canon and Canon Theologian since 2011; resigned archdeaconry before 17 June 2018)
- before 17 June 2018 – before 31 May 2021: David Stanton (canon and Treasurer since 2013; Sub-Dean since before 21 October 2018)
- 2021–2024: Tricia Hillas (canon since 9 May 2021; Steward and Archdeacon since before 31 May 2021; also Speaker's Chaplain since 4 March 2020)
- 2024–2025: Anthony Ball (canon since September 2016)
- From 2026: Jennifer Adams-Massmann
