= Chaplain to the Speaker of the House of Commons =

House of Commons chaplain

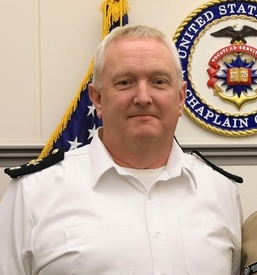
- Incumbent; Andrew Hillier since 2026
- Church of England
- Formation: 1660
- First holder: Edward Voyce
- Unofficial names: The Speaker's Chaplain
- Website: Official Website

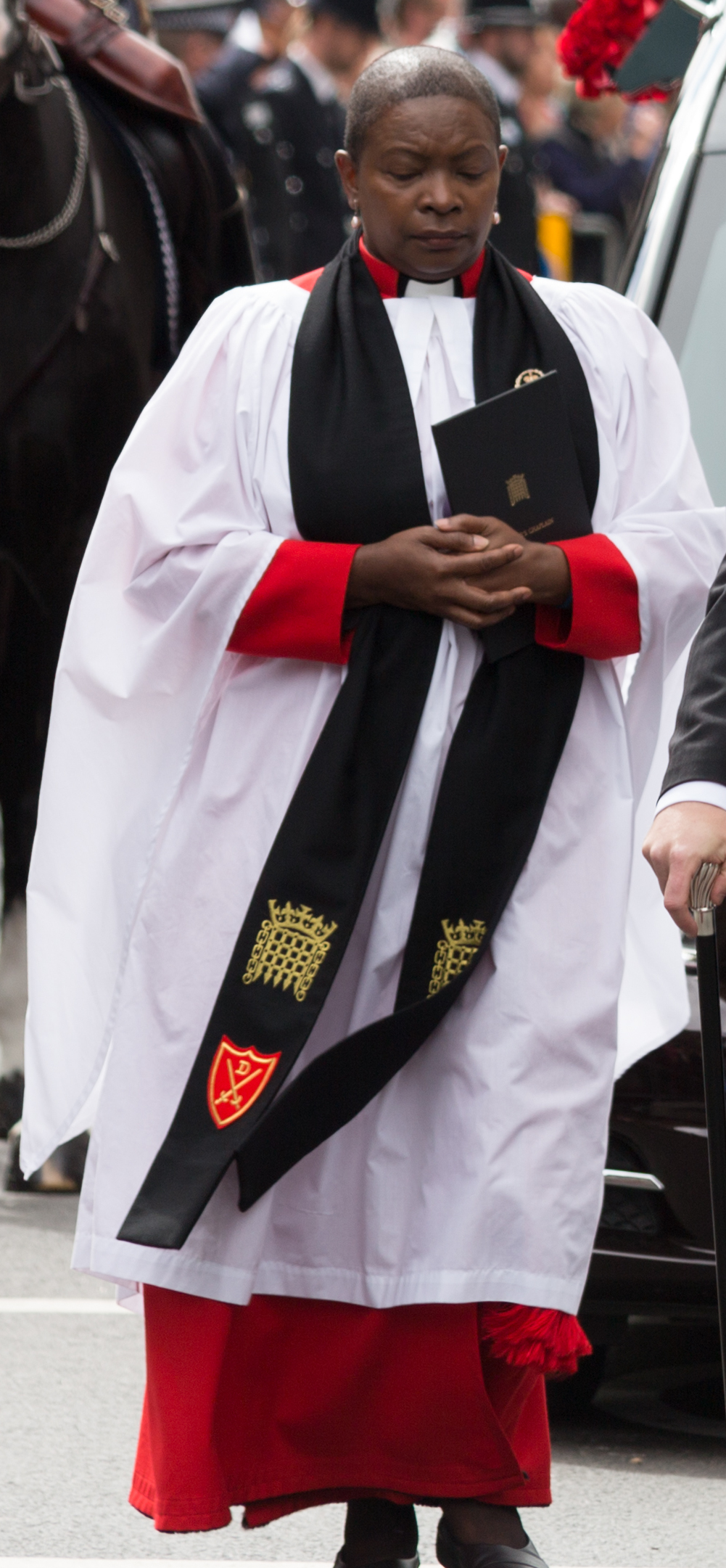
Rose Hudson-Wilkin robed as the Speaker's Chaplain: her tippet is embroidered with Parliament's symbol (a portcullis)

The Chaplain to the Speaker of the House of Commons, also known as the Speaker's Chaplain, is a Church of England priest who officiates at services held at the Palace of Westminster and its associated chapel, St Mary Undercroft. The Chaplain also acts as chaplain to the Speaker and Members of Parliament. The first Speaker's Chaplain was appointed in 1660. The current officeholder is the Venerable Andrew Hillier.

From 1972 to 2010, the Speaker's Chaplain also held the position of Rector of St Margaret's, Westminster, the parish church of the Palace of Westminster.

== List of Chaplains to the Speaker of the House of Commons ==
17th century

- Edward Voyce (1660)
- Henry Carpenter (1661)
- Henry Wotton (1663)
- Mr. Barker (1675)
- Mr. Willet (1689)
- Peter Birch (1689)
- Thomas Manningham (1690–1694)
- Maurice Vaughan (1694–1695)
- Samuel Barton (1695–1697)
- William Hallifax (1697–1698)
- William Galloway (1698–1700)

18th century

- John Herne (1701)
- Francis Gastrell (1701–1702)
- William Stratford (1702–1705)
- Thomas Goddard (1705–1708)
- Laurence Brodrick (1708–1710)
- Jonathan Kimberley (1710–1713)
- John Pelling (1713–1714)
- Henry Barker (1715–)
- Thomas Manningham (1718–1723), son of the previous Thomas Manningham
- George Ingram (1723–1728)
- Scawen Kenrick (1728)
- William Burchett (1736–1739)
- Richard Terrick (1739–1742)
- Arthur Young (1742–1746)
- John Fulham (1746–)
- Richard Cope (1751–1754)
- Reeve Ballard (1754–1758)
- Charles Burdett (1758–1762)
- Richard Cust (1762–1765)
- Richard Palmer (1765–1769)
- William Barford (1769–1770)
- James King (1770–1774)
- Arthur Onslow (1774–1779)
- Cuthbert Allanson (1779–1780†)
- William Welfitt (1780)
- Folliott Cornewall (1780–1784)
- Philip Williams (1784–1789)
- Charles Moss (1789–1791)
- Thomas Hay (1791–1795)
- Thomas Causton (1795–1796)
- William Busby (1796–1801)

19th century

- John Barton (1801–1802)
- Samuel Smith (1802–1806)
- Frederick Barnes (1806–1807)
- Charles Proby (1807–1812)
- James Webber (1812–1815)
- Robert Stevens (1815–1818)
- Christopher Wordsworth (1818–1820)
- William Frederick Baylay (1820–1824)
- Thomas Manners-Sutton (1824–1827)
- Evelyn Levett Sutton (1827–)
- Frederick Vernon Lockwood (1830–1832)
- Edward Repton (1832–1833)
- Temple Frere (1833–1835)
- John Vane (1835–)
- Gerrard Thomas Andrewes (1839–1849)
- Thomas Garnier (1849–1857)
- Henry Drury (1857–1862)
- Charles Merivale (1863–1869)
- Henry White (1869–1874, 1889–1890†)
- Francis Byng (1874–1889)
- Frederic Farrar (1890–1895)
- Basil Wilberforce (1896–1916†)

20th century

- William Hartley Carnegie (1916–1936)
- Alan Don (1936–1946)
- Christopher Cheshire (1946–1955)
- John McLeod Campbell (1955–1961)
- Michael Stancliffe (1961–1969)
- Thomas Nevill (1969–1972)
- David Edwards (1972–1978)
- John Baker (1978–1982)
- Trevor Beeson (1982–1987)
- Donald Gray (1987–1998)
- Robert Wright (1998–2010)

21st century

- Robert Wright (1998–2010)
- Rose Hudson-Wilkin (2010–2019)
- Patricia Hillas (2019–2024).
- Mark Birch (2024 - 2026)
- Andrew Hillier (2026 - present)
