= Trevor Beeson =

British priest (1926–2023)

The Very Reverend Trevor Beeson OBE AKC FKC

Dean of Winchester
- In office 1987–1996

Personal details
- Born: Trevor Randall Beeson; 2 March 1926 Gedling, England
- Died: 17 October 2023 (aged 97)
- Spouse: Josephine Cope (m. 1950; died 1997)
- Education: King's College London; St Boniface College, Warminster

Trevor Randall Beeson OBE AKC FKC (2 March 1926 – 17 October 2023) was a British Anglican clergyman who was Dean of Winchester in the last two decades of the 20th century. He was also a writer, authoring numerous books and working as an ecclesiastical obituarist.

== Biography ==
Beeson was born in Gedling in 1926. He was educated at King's College London, studied theology at St Boniface College, Warminster, and was ordained in 1952.

He began his career with a curacy in Leadgate, County Durham, after which he was priest in charge of St Chad, Stockton-on-Tees and then on the staff of St Martin-in-the-Fields, Trafalgar Square. Following this he was Vicar of Ware, Hertfordshire and Canon Treasurer of Westminster. He served as Chaplain to the Speaker of the House of Commons from 1982 to 1987, before his elevation to the Deanery. He contributed obituaries to The Daily Telegraph and was a columnist for The Guardian. In retirement Beeson wrote a book about his fellow Deans.

In 1976 the Archbishop of Canterbury conferred on Beeson the Lambeth degree of Master of Arts. He was appointed Officer of the Order of the British Empire (OBE) in the 1997 New Year Honours "for services to the Church of England, particularly as Dean of Winchester Cathedral." He was awarded an honorary DLitt degree by Southampton University in 1999.

Beeson was married to the former Josephine Cope from 1950 until her death in 1997; they had two daughters. One of Beeson's daughters, Catherine, married Charles Taylor, future Dean of Peterborough; they met whilst Taylor and Beeson were clergy at Westminster Abbey and married there. Beeson died on 17 October 2023, at the age of 97.

== Publications ==
- New Area Mission: The parish in the new housing estates (Star Books series), A.R. Mowbray & Co., London, 1963.
- The ministry in new areas, Prism pamphlet no.11, London, 1964.
- Partnership in ministry (ed.), A.R. Mowbray & Co., London, 1964.
- Worship in a united church (with Robin Sharp), Star Books for Anglican-Methodist Reunion, second series, no.7, A.R. Mowbray, Oxford, 1964.
- New Area Ministry (Church's Ministry Series no.2), Church Information Office, Westminster, 1965.
- The world is the agenda: report of a conference of the World Council of Churches Western European Working Group on The Missionary Structure of the Congregation 25–28 April 1966, Parish & People, London, 1966.
- An eye for an ear, SCM Press, 1972. ISBN 0-334-00434-9
- The Church of England in Crisis, Davis-Poynter, London, 1973. ISBN 0-7067-0058-9
- Discretion and valour: religious conditions in Eastern Europe (written with the advice and assistance of the British Council of Churches Working Party on Religious Conditions in Eastern Europe), with a foreword by Sir John Lawrence, William Collins Sons & Co., Glasgow, for the British Council of Churches, 1974. ISBN 0-00-623689-8
- Pioneering on the Christian Frontier (Audenshaw Papers no.50), Audenshaw Foundation, Manchester, 1975.
- To publish or not to publish? (Audenshaw Papers no.51), Audenshaw Foundation, Manchester, 1975.
- Christians and socialism (Audenshaw Papers no.55), Audenshaw Foundation, Manchester, 1976.
- Britain today and tomorrow, Collins, London, 1978. ISBN 0-00-625126-9
- Westminster Abbey, FISA, London, 1981. ISBN 84-378-0854-5
- Discretion and valour: religious conditions in Russia and eastern Europe (revised edition of 1974 publication), Fount Paperbacks, London, 1982. ISBN 0-00-625701-1
- A vision of hope: the churches and change in Latin America (ed. with Jenny Pearce), Collins, London, 1984. ISBN 0-00-626698-3
- A dean's diary: Winchester, 1987-1996, SCM Press, 1997. ISBN 0-334-02754-3
- Window on Westminster: a Canon's diary, 1976–1987, SCM Press, 1998. ISBN 0-334-02745-4
- Rebels and reformers: Christian renewal in the twentieth century, SCM Press, 1999. ISBN 0-334-02792-6
- The bishops, SCM Press, 2002. ISBN 0-334-02867-1
- Priests And Prelates: The Daily Telegraph Clerical Obituaries (ed. & intro), Continuum, 2002. ISBN 0-8264-6337-1 (new editions 2004, ISBN 0-8264-7133-1, and 2006, ISBN 0-8264-8100-0)
- The deans, SCM Press, 2004. ISBN 0-334-02987-2
- The canons: cathedral close encounters, SCM Press, 2006. ISBN 0-334-04041-8
- Round the Church in 50 years: a personal journey, SCM Press, 2007. ISBN 0-334-04148-1
- In tuneful accord: the church musicians, SCM Press, 2009. ISBN 0-334-04193-7
- The church's folk songs: from Hymns Ancient & Modern to Common Prayer 1861-2011, Canterbury Press, 2011. ISBN 978-1-84825-107-6
- The Church's other half: women's ministry, SCM Press, 2011. ISBN 0-334-04382-4

== Notes ==
Church of England titles
| Preceded by Michael Stancliffe | Dean of Winchester; 1987–1996 | Succeeded by Michael Till |
