= Sir Richard Cope, 9th Baronet =

English clergyman

Sir Richard Cope, 9th Baronet (died 6 November 1806) was an English clergyman who served as Chaplain to the Speaker of the House of Commons.

Cope was the son of Galen Cope, Rector of Eversley, Hampshire (himself the son of Sir John Cope, 5th Baronet). He was educated at Clare College, Cambridge (matriculated 1740, graduated B.A. 1744, M.A. 1747, D.D. 1765), and was ordained priest in February 1746.

In 1751, Cope was appointed the 28th Chaplain to the Speaker of the House of Commons by Speaker Arthur Onslow.

Cope was a Prebendary of Westminster Abbey 1754–1806, Rector of Islip, Oxfordshire from 1767, and Rector of Eversley.

Cope succeeded to the Cope baronetcy in 1779, and died on 6 November 1806.

Baronetage of England
Preceded by John Mordaunt Cope	Baronet (of Hanwell); 1779–1806	Succeeded by Denzil Cope
