= Michael Stancliffe =

English Anglican priest (1916–1987)

The Very Reverend Michael Stancliffe

Dean of Winchester
- In office 1969–1986

Personal details
- Born: 8 April 1916
- Died: 26 March 1987 (aged 70)
- Spouse: Barbara Elizabeth née Tatlow
- Education: Haileybury; Trinity College, Oxford

Michael Staffurth Stancliffe (8 April 1916 – 26 March 1987) was an English Anglican priest who served as the Dean of Winchester from 1969 to 1986.

== Career ==
Stancliffe trained for ordination at Lincoln Theological College, and was ordained deacon in 1940 and priest in 1941. He was a curate at St James', Southbroom, Devizes 1940–1943 before becoming the priest-in-charge at Ramsbury 1943–1944, and then curate of Cirencester and priest-in-charge of Holy Trinity, Watermoor, Cirencester, 1944–1949.

He was then a Master and Chaplain at Westminster School 1949–1957 and also Preacher to Lincoln's Inn, 1954–1957. Following this he was Rector of St Margaret's, Westminster, a Canon of Westminster Abbey 1957–1969, and Speaker's Chaplain 1961–1969 before his elevation to the Deanery of Winchester.

He was a member of General Synod 1970–1980 and Chairman of the Council for Places of Worship, 1972–1975; Fellow of Winchester College 1973. He was also considered for the post of Bishop of Carlisle.

His son, David Stancliffe, was the Bishop of Salisbury.

== Notes ==
Church of England titles
Preceded by Oswin Gibbs-Smith	Dean of Winchester; 1969–1986	Succeeded by Trevor Beeson
