= John Baker (bishop) =

Bishop of Salisbury; British Anglican bishop (1928-2014)

The Right Reverend John Baker
- Bishop of Salisbury
- Church: Church of England
- Diocese: Diocese of Salisbury
- In office: 1982–1993
- Predecessor: George Reindorp
- Successor: David Stancliffe
- Other post: Honorary assistant bishop in Winchester (1994–2014)

Orders
- Ordination: c. 1954 (deacon); 1955 (priest)
- Consecration: 1982

Personal details
- Born: 11 January 1928
- Died: 4 June 2014 (aged 86)
- Denomination: Anglican
- Parents: George and Grace Austin Baker
- Spouse: Gillian Leach (m. 1974)
- Profession: Author (theology & church)
- Education: Oriel College, Oxford

John Austin Baker (11 January 1928 – 4 June 2014) was a Church of England bishop, serving as Bishop of Salisbury from 1982 until his retirement in 1993.

== Early life ==
He was the only child born to George Austin Baker and his wife Grace Baker. Though his father was a company secretary, three uncles and an aunt had taken holy orders. He was educated at Marlborough College and Oriel College, Oxford. He was awarded the degrees Oxford Master of Arts (MA Oxon) and Master of Letters (MLitt).

== Religious life ==
Made a deacon at Michaelmas 1954 (19 September), by Robert Hay, Bishop of Buckingham, at High Wycombe parish church, and ordained priest in 1955, he began his ministry with curacies at All Saint's Cuddesdon and St Anselm's Hatch End, after which he was a fellow and lecturer at Corpus Christi College, Oxford until 1973. From then until his ordination to the episcopate he was a residential canon at Westminster Abbey and also for some years chaplain to the Speaker of the House of Commons. He was consecrated a bishop on 2 February 1982, by Robert Runcie, Archbishop of Canterbury, at Westminster Abbey.

A keen musician, Baker was a prominent author. In retirement he continued to serve as an assistant bishop in the Diocese of Winchester.

Church of England titles
Preceded by George Reindorp	Bishop of Salisbury; 1982–1993	Succeeded by David Stancliffe
