= Associateship of King's College =

Qualification awarded by King's College

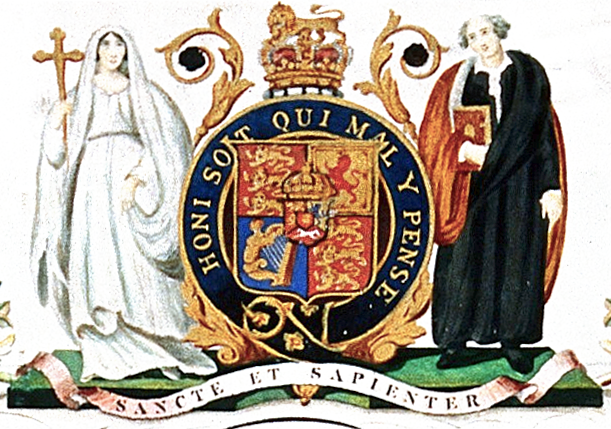
- Location: London
- Country: United Kingdom
- Presented by: King's College London
- Eligibility: King's College London students, alumni and staff
- Post-nominals: AKC
- Rewards: Honorific post-nominals, right to wear the AKC epitoge with King's College London's academic dress on graduation.
- Status: Currently awarded
- Established: 1834; 192 years ago
- First award: 1835

The Associateship of King's College (AKC) award was the degree-equivalent qualification of King's College London from 1833. It is the original qualification that King's awarded to its students. In current practice, it is an optional award, unique to King's College London, that students can study in addition to their degree proper. After successfully completing the AKC course, participants may apply to be elected by the Academic Board of King's College London as an 'Associate of King's College' (AKC). Once their election has been ratified, they are permitted to use the post-nominal letters "AKC" along with their main qualification.

== Overview ==
In December 1833 the college's council established a committee to organise the disparate courses offered at King's. As a result of this committee's report, the AKC was established by the college's council on 14 February 1834 as a three-year general course based on a core of divinity, mathematics, classics and English, with other options added in the second and third years. The first awards were made at the annual distribution of prizes in the General Department on 27 June 1835.

From 1909, only students registered for a University of London degree at King's were normally allowed to study for the associateship. The two-year course involves weekly lectures concerning theology, ethics and philosophy. All members of staff at King's may study for the AKC as a free-standing qualification. From 2015, King's alumni—who in their student days opted out of the AKC study—can now study for the programme via distance learning.

The 21st-century AKC offers a programme of inclusive, research-led lectures which allows students to explore diverse religious and cultural perspectives. The AKC is at the heart of the College's commitment to an international, interdisciplinary, and innovative curriculum: it seeks to foster an understanding of different beliefs and cultures that can be taken into wider society.

== Assessment methods ==
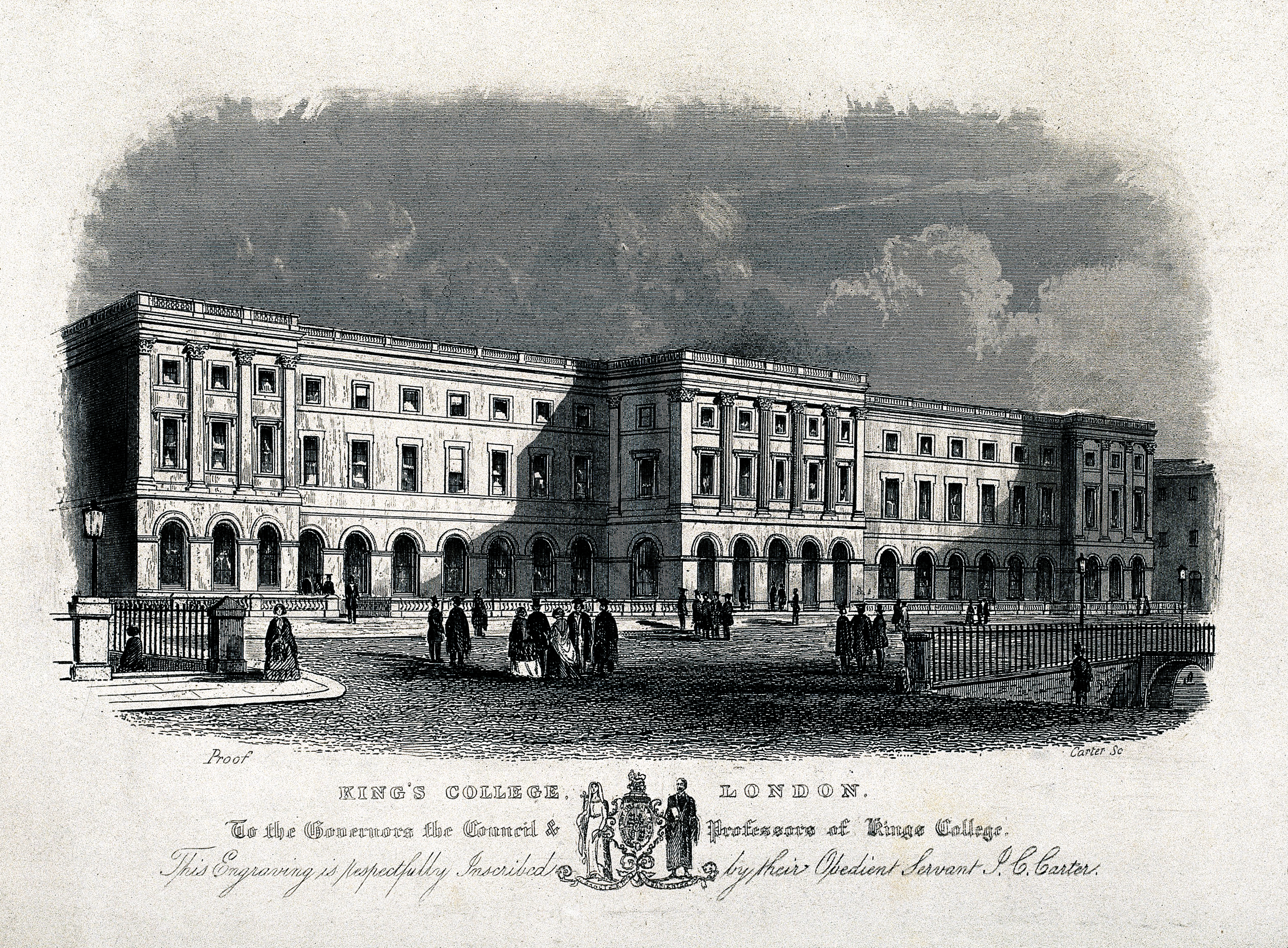
An engraving of the College's historic Strand Campus.

The AKC programme is assessed by lecture attendance. Lecture attendance is demonstrated by a student's successful completion of a short, online, qualitative quiz after each lecture. Students must demonstrate attendance at 4/9 lectures during each series (semester) to gain a 'pass' mark. Gaining a 'pass' for all four series taken over the course of two years (subject to specific exceptions e.g. students studying abroad for part of their degree programme) entitles the students to wear an epitoge on their academic dress during their graduation exercises. After graduating from King's, students/alumni who succeed in the AKC exams are eligible to be elected as Associates of King's College by the Academic Board of King's College London. Staff who succeed in the AKC are likewise eligible for election.

== Previous assessment methods ==
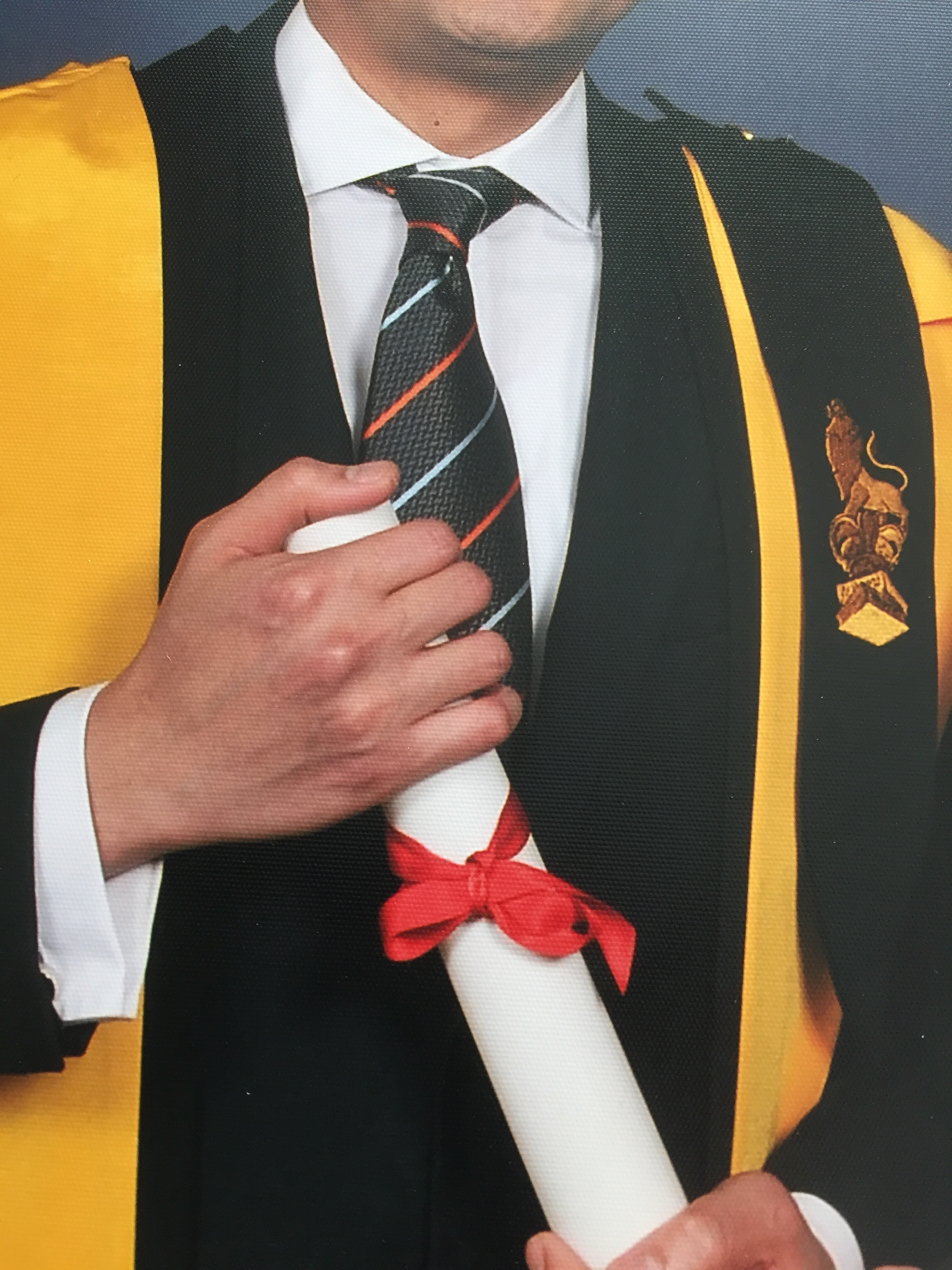
An AKC epitoge accompanying the academic dress of King's College London.

The AKC has been assessed via weekly qualitative quizzes since the academic year 2019/20. Up until the academic year 2019/20, students were assessed by an annual exam which included three equally weighted questions. Students were allowed to pick two questions from one semester, and one question from the other semester. Each question was based on a lecture that had taken place that academic year.

Students who successfully completed the AKC achieved a 'pass' for the award overall. For each academic year, however, they will have achieved an assessment result that was given as a Pass (40-59), Pass with Merit (60-69) or Pass with Distinction (70+) depending on their average grade for the assessment that year.

== Theological AKC ==
From 1848 to 1972, the Theological Department of King's College London (a distinct institution from King's College London and not to be confused with the latter's Faculty of Theology) awarded the Theological AKC. This was an ordination qualification in the Church of England and was a three-year, full-time course of studies. Some ordination candidates read the AKC only and some read the combined BD/AKC course, receiving both qualifications at the end of the three years. The Theological AKC was equivalent to a BA pass degree in theology. It was awarded in three classes with an undivided second class. Holders were entitled to wear distinctive academic dress by a grant of the Archbishop of Canterbury. The hood is of the "Cambridge shape" (MA), made of black poplin and edged, inside and out, with "one inch of mauve silk". The gown resembles the classic MA design of the ancient universities with a few exceptions (e.g. it had a black button and cord at the back of the yoke). Also, its sleeves are cut square, that is, without the "crescent" shaping of the other universities.
