= Dean and Chapter of Westminster =

Ecclesiastical governing body of Westminster Abbey

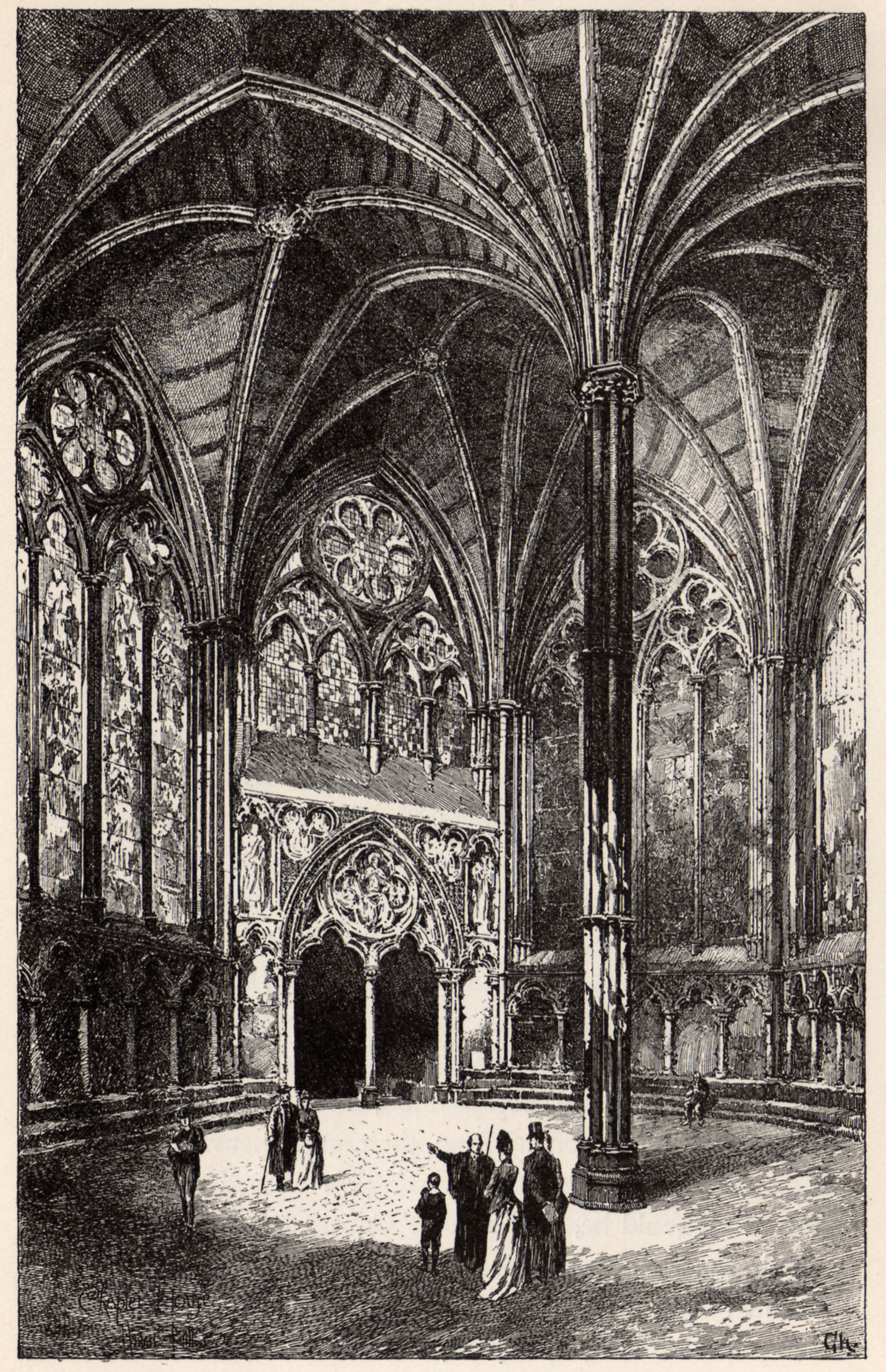
The Chapter House at Westminster Abbey

The Dean and Chapter of Westminster are the ecclesiastical governing body of Westminster Abbey, a collegiate church of the Church of England and royal peculiar in Westminster, Greater London. They consist of the dean and several canons meeting in chapter and are also (less frequently) known as the Dean and Canons of Westminster.

== Foundation ==
The first college of canons was established by letters patent on 17 December 1540 by Henry VIII. Under the Bishop of Westminster of the newly created Diocese of Westminster, there was a dean and 12 canons, six of whom were former monks of the abbey. They survived the dissolution of the diocese in 1550, becoming a second cathedral of the Diocese of London until 1556 when the college was dissolved by Mary I. The second college of canons was established on 21 May 1560 by Elizabeth I, this time as a royal peculiar. From 16 November 1645 the dean and canons were dispersed, and a committee of the Lords and Commons from the Long Parliament governed. The dean and canons were restored on the Restoration in 1660.

== Current chapter ==
As of 29 September 2022:

Dean of Westminster
| David Hoyle | Dean of Westminster (since 16 November 2019) |
Canons Residentiary of Westminster
| David Stanton | Canon Residentiary (since 5 October 2013 installation); Sub-Dean (since before 21 October 2018); Canon Treasurer (since 2013) |
| Anthony Ball | Canon Residentiary (since 10 September 2016 installation); Rector of St Margaret's (since 2020) |
| Jamie Hawkey | Canon Residentiary (since 19 January 2019 installation); Canon Theologian (since installation); Almoner (since before 31 May 2021) |
| Tricia Hillas | Canon Residentiary (since 9 May 2021 installation); Chaplain to the Speaker of the House of Commons (since 4 March 2020); Canon Steward (since before 31 May 2021); Archdeacon of Westminster (since before 31 May 2021) |
Minor Canons (Note: The Minor Canons do not form part of the Chapter, but are nonetheless full-time clergy of the abbey.)
| Mark Birch | Minor Canon (since January 2015 installation); Precentor (since 1 April 2020); Sacrist (2017–2020); Chaplain (installation–2017) |
| Robert Latham | Minor Canon and Sacrist (since 19 September 2021) |
| Helena Bickley-Percival | Minor Canon and Chaplain (from 23 April 2024) |
Receiver General (Note: The Receiver General is a lay member of the abbey, and the clerk to the Dean and Chapter.)
| Paul Baumann | Receiver General and Chapter Clerk (since 24 November 2018 installation) |

== Roles within the chapter ==
Today, the roles divided between the canons residentiary generally include: the sub-dean, who is second to the dean; the canon treasurer; the canon steward, who is responsible for the welcoming of visitors; canon theologian; the canon almoner; the Archdeacon of Westminster; and the rector of St Margaret's. Between and among the chapter of canons, roles can be and are reshuffled as desired. The minor canons are the precentor, the sacrist and, since 2016, the Abbey chaplain (not to be confused with the Speaker's Chaplain). Historically, other roles have included the Chaplain to the Speaker of the House of Commons ("Speaker's Chaplain" or "Chaplain to the Commons"), the Headmaster of Westminster School and the rector of St John's, Smith Square (also called St John the Evangelist, Westminster.)

== List of canons ==
=== First foundation (cathedral, 1540–1556) ===
The first a canon of each stall was appointed by Henry VIII in the foundation charter dated 17 December 1540. Eight canons were deprived of their prebends by Mary I on 30 March 1554 and one resigned shortly after; only three remained in post. (See also: Marian exiles.)

Canons of the 1st Prebend

- 17 December 1540 – 1552 (d.): Simon Haynes, Dean of Exeter
- 8 November 1552 – 26 September 1556: Andrew Perne

Canons of the 2nd Prebend

- 17 December 1540 – 4 November 1551 (d.): John Redman, Archdeacon of Taunton (also Archdeacon of Stafford until 1547)
- 5 December 1551 – 30 March 1554 (deprived): Alexander Nowell, Headmaster
- 12 May 1554 – 26 September 1556: John Richards

Canons of the 3rd Prebend

- 17 December 1540 – bef. 1547 (res.): Edward Layton
- 15 June 1547 – 30 March 1554 (deprived): Edward Keble
- 12 April 1554 – 26 September 1556: John Baker

Canons of the 4th Prebend

- 17 December 1540 – August 1552 (d.): Anthony Belasyse (also Archdeacon of Colchester from 1543)
- August–December 1552 (res.): James Haddon (became Dean of Exeter)
- 16 December 1552 – 30 March 1554 (deprived): Richard Alvey
- 12 May 1554 – 26 September 1556: John Ramridge

Canons of the 5th Prebend

- 17 December 1540 – 18 July 1552 (d.): William Bretten
- 30 July 1552 – 10 May 1554 (res.): Edmund Grindal, Precentor of St Paul's
- 28 May 1554 – 1554 (d.): John Moreman
- 11 September 1554 – 26 September 1556: John Smith

Canons of the 6th Prebend

- 17 December 1540 – bef. 1543 (d.): Denis Dalyon (former prior)
- 18 May 1543 – 30 March 1554 (deprived): John Pekyns
- 5 April 1554 – 26 September 1556: Francis Mallet (also Dean of Lincoln from 1554)

Canons of the 7th Prebend

- 17 December 1540 – 30 March 1554 (deprived): Humphrey Parkyns/Charite (former monk)
- 18 May 1554 – 26 September 1556: Alphonso de Salinas

Canons of the 8th Prebend

- 17 December 1540 – 1542 (d.): Thomas Essex/Baxter (former monk)
- 8 December 1542 – bef. 1545 (d.): Francis Turpin
- 15 November 1545 – bef. 1553 (res.): Nicholas Ridley (also Bishop of Rochester from 1547; Bishop of London and Westminster from 1550)
- 4 July 1553 – 26 September 1556: Hugh Griffith

Canons of the 9th Prebend

- 17 December 1540 – bef. 1546 (res.): Thomas Elfryde (former monk)
- 23 July 1546 – 30 March 1554 (deprived): Bernard Sandiforth
- 21 April 1554 – 26 September 1556: Henry Cole (also Provost of Eton; became Dean of St Paul's)

Canons of the 10th Prebend

- 17 December 1540 – 1541 (d.): John Rumney/Malvern (former monk)
- 26 November 1541 – 30 March 1554 (deprived): Edmund Weston
- 12 May 1554 – 26 September 1556: Thomas Wood

Canons of the 11th Prebend

- 17 December 1540 – 1544 (d.): William Harvye/Faythe (former monk)
- 28 November 1544 – 26 September 1556: Thomas Reynold

Canons of the 12th Prebend

- 17 December 1540 – 1549 (d.): Gerard Carleton (also Dean of Peterborough from 1543)
- 7 September 1549 – bef. 1551 (d.): Giles Eyer
- 20 October 1551 – 30 March 1554 (deprived): Thomas Birkhed
- 3 May 1554 – 26 September 1556: William Pye

The first secular chapter was abolished on 26 September 1556.

=== Second Foundation (Royal Peculiar, 1560–1660) ===
Twelve canons were appointed (or re-appointed) by Elizabeth I at the refoundation of the secular chapter, 21 May 1560.

Canons of the 1st Prebend

- 30 June 1560 – bef. 1566 (res.): William Barlow, Bishop of Chichester
- 20 April 1566 – 2 May 1585 (d.): Thomas Browne (sometime Sub-Dean; also Headmaster until 1570)
- 26 May 1585 – 27 February 1633 (d.): Thomas Montford
- 8 March 1633 – bef. 1652 (d.): Gabriel More

Canons of the 2nd Prebend

- 30 June 1560 – 16 November 1577 (d.): Humphrey Parkyns/Charite (former 7th canon)
- 23 April 1578 – 25 April 1587 (d.): John Reade
- 9 May 1587 – bef. 1609 (d.): Richard Wood
- 27 September 1609 – bef. 1626 (res.): Henry Caesar or Adelmare (also Dean of Ely from 1614)
- 10 January 1626 – bef. 1653 (d.): Thomas Wilson

Canons of the 3rd Prebend

- 30 June 1560 – bef. 1561 (res.): John Hardyman
- 16 November 1561 – 1606 (d.): Perceval Wiburn
- 6 May 1606 – September 1623 (d.): John Fox
- October 1623 – bef. 1635 (res.): John Wilson (previously Headmaster; also Dean of Ripon 1624 – 1634)
- 21 February 1635 – 1638 (res.): Matthew Wren (also Bishop of Hereford until 1635; Bishop of Norwich from 1635)
- 24 April 1638 – 1645 (res.): Richard Steward (became Dean)

Canons of the 4th Prebend

- 30 June 1560 – 1562 (res.): Richard Cheyney (became Bishop of Gloucester and of Bristol)
- 12 September 1563 – July 1570 (d.): Thomas Norley
- 10 August 1570 – bef. 1571 (res.): William Wickham (became a canon of Windsor)
- 19 June 1571 – bef. 1575 (exch.): Robert Ramsden
- bef. 1575 – 1579 (res.): William Chaderton (became Bishop of Chester)
- 26 November 1579 – 1586 (d.): Thomas Wagstaff
- 31 December 1586 – bef. 1602 (d.): Richard Webster (also Archdeacon of Middlesex from 1595)
- bef. 1602 – 23 November 1616 (d.): Richard Hakluyt
- 29 November 1616 – 10 January 1631 (d.): John Holt
- 5 February 1631 – ?: Lewis Wemys

Canons of the 5th Prebend

- 30 June 1560 – bef. 1574 (res.): Richard Alvey (former 4th canon)
- 13 February 1574 – bef. 1576 (d.): Thomas Aldriche, Archdeacon of Sudbury (previously 7th canon)
- 1576 – bef. 1582 (d.): John Rugge, Archdeacon of Wells
- 1582 – 8 February 1608 (d.): Nicholas Bond, Rector of St Giles in the Fields
- 5 March 1608 – bef. 1642 (d.): William Robinson (also Archdeacon of Nottingham from 1635)
- 17 June 1642 – August 1661 (d.): Matthew Nicholas (also Dean of Bristol until 1660; Dean of St Paul's from 1660)

Canons of the 6th Prebend

- 30 June 1560 – 1561 (res.): Edmund Scambler, Bishop of Peterborough
- 1562: Robert Rolles, Headmaster (ineffective)
- 1562 – June 1565 (d.): John Beaumont
- 1565 – bef. 1567 (res.): Matthew Hutton (also a canon of St Paul's; became Dean of York)
- 1567 – bef. 1577 (d.): Walter Jones
- 1577 – bef. 1607 (d.): Griffith Lewis (also Dean of Gloucester from 1594)
- 8 June 1607 – 31 October 1631 (d.): George Darrell
- 9 November 1631 – 8 May 1662 (d.): Peter Heylin (Sub-Dean from 1660)

Canons of the 7th Prebend

- 21 May 1560 – bef. 1564 (res.): Alexander Nowell (former 2nd canon; also Archdeacon of Middlesex until November 1560; Dean of St Paul's from November 1560)
- 1564 – bef. 1567 (res.): John Hill
- 1567 – bef. 1570 (res.): John Pory (Master of Corpus)
- 1570 – bef. 1573 (res.): Thomas Aldriche, Archdeacon of Sudbury and Master of Corpus (later 5th canon)
- 1573–1593 (res.): John Still (also Archdeacon of Sudbury from 1577; became Bishop of Bath and Wells)
- 20 February 1593 – 1607 (res.): Thomas Ravis (also Bishop of Gloucester from 1605)
- 10 May 1607 – bef. 1623 (res.): Hugh Goodman (also Dean of Rochester from 1621)
- July 1623 – 15 December 1631 (d.): Theodore Price
- 12 January 1632 – 15 March 1634 (d.): Roger Bates
- 3 April 1634 – 1639 (res.): John Towers, Dean of Peterborough
- January 1639 – 19 December 1643 (d.): Jonathan Browne, Dean of Hereford

Canons of the 8th Prebend

- 21 May 1560 – bef. 1583 (d.): William Latymer, Dean of Peterborough
- 15 October 1583 – bef. 1621 (d.): Edward Buckley
- 22 January 1621 – 1628 (res.): William Laud (also Bishop of St Davids November 1621 – 1626; Bishop of Bath and Wells 1626–1628)
- 1628–1641 (res.): Griffith Williams (also Dean of Bangor from 1634)
- January 1641 – 1663: Benjamin Lany (former 10th canon; also Bishop of Peterborough from 1660)

Canons of the 9th Prebend

- 21 May 1560 – 23 April 1594 (d.): Richard Ryve (also a canon of Windsor)
- 20 April 1594 – bef. 1620 (d.): Cuthbert Bellott (also Archdeacon of Chester from 1595)
- bef. 1620 – 21 June 1642 (d.): Robert Newell

Canons of the 10th Prebend

- 21 May 1560 – bef. 1564 (res.): William Downham (also Bishop of Chester from 1561)
- 1564–1572 (res.): Edmund Freke, Archdeacon of Canterbury (also a canon of Windsor 1565–1571; Dean of Rochester 1570–1571; Dean of Salisbury 1571–1571; Bishop of Rochester from 1571)
- 1572 – 10 April 1605 (d.): John Young (also Bishop of Rochester from 1578)
- 30 April 1605 – 1629 (d.): Christopher Sutton
- 1629 – February 1639 (deprived): Lambert Osbaldeston, Headmaster
- June 1639 – 1641 (moved): Benjamin Lany (moved to 8th prebend)
- 1641–1659 (d.): Lambert Osbaldeston (again)

Canons of the 11th Prebend

- 21 May 1560 – bef. 1579 (d.): William Young
- 1579 – 26 February 1592 (d.): John Wickham
- 13 March 1592 – 1597 (res.): Richard Bancroft (also a canon of St Paul's; became Bishop of London)
- 1597–1601 (res.): Lancelot Andrewes (became Dean)
- 5 July 1601 – 15 January 1613 (d.): Adrian Saravia
- 20 January 1613 – bef. 1638 (d.): Gabriel Grant
- 28 September 1638 – bef. 1663 (d.): William Haywood

Canons of the 12th Prebend

- 21 May 1560 – 1561 (res.): Gabriel Goodman (also a canon of St Paul's; afterwards Dean)
- 1561–1577 (d.): Thomas Watts, Archdeacon of Middlesex
- 27 May 1577 – 4 August 1601 (d.): Edward Grant (also Headmaster 1572–1592; sometime Sub-Dean)
- 1601 – 7 September 1613 (d.): William Barlow (also Dean of Chester 1602–1605; Bishop of Rochester 1605–1608; Bishop of Lincoln from 1608)
- 15 September 1613 – 7 August 1638 (d.): John King (also a canon of Windsor from 1625)
- 28 September 1638 – bef. 1643 (d.): George Aglionby (nominated Dean of Chichester 1642; nominated Dean of Canterbury 1643)
- 1643: Henry Killigrew (probably ineffective; later a canon in Killigrew succession)

=== Second Foundation (Royal Peculiar, since 1660) ===
The prebendaries admitted since the Restoration in 1660 have had no fixed stalls to their prebends, but upon any vacancy the new prebendary was installed in the lowest stall on the side where the vacancy happened, and not in the stall of him who died, or was promoted. Since all but four (5th, 6th, 8th & 11th) prebends were vacant before 1660, it is not possible to assert that any particular succession of canons relates to any previous prebend except for those four.

A prebend at Westminster was highly sought after by the ecclesiastical establishment. The value of the prebend helped to enrich the salaries of some of the poorer bishops, who retained their prebends at Westminster whilst in office. Other distinguishing features of the Westminster chapter were the close links with Westminster School – thirteen headmasters were canons – and eleven members of the peerage or baronetage were members of the chapter at various times.

The Ecclesiastical Commissioners reports in 1835 and 1836 (as enacted in the statute 3 & 4 Queen Victoria c. 113) called for a reduction in the number of canons from twelve to six. Two of the remaining prebends were united with the rectories of St Margaret's, Westminster and St John's, Smith Square (which had already been held by a canon of no particular prebend for quite some time). The number of prebends was reduced further from six to five in 1890 on the resignation of Brooke Foss Westcott and from five to four in 1941 on the resignation of Russell Barry (rector of St John's).

Canons are listed here by succession, rather than by chronological order of appointment.

Canons in the succession of John Doughty

- 5 July 1660 – 25 December 1672 (d.): John Doughty
- 11 January 1673 – 14 April 1683 (d.): John North
- 3 May 1683 – bef. 1691 (res.): Edward Felling
- 16 July 1691 – bef. 1707 (d.): Stephen Upman
- 17 October 1707 – 6 August 1711 (d.): Thomas Knipe, Headmaster
- 27 September 1711 – 7 March 1720 (d.): Jonathan Kimberley (also Dean of Lichfield from 1713)
- 11 May 1720 – 4 May 1750 (d.): Thomas Manningham (Yr), Speaker's Chaplain
- 2 November 1750 – bef. 1754 (res.): Philip Yonge (became a canon of St Paul's)
- 30 April 1754 – 26 November 1806 (d.): Richard Cope (Sir Richard Cope, Bt. after 1779)
- 1 January 1807 – 7 June 1828 (d.): Lord Henry Fitzroy
- 2 August 1828 – 12 August 1844 (d.): Henry Bayley, Archdeacon of Stow
- 26 October 1844 – 1869 (res.): Christopher Wordsworth (Archdeacon 1864–1868; became Bishop of Lincoln)
- 25 February 1869 – 16 November 1894 (d.): George Prothero (father of Sir George and Lord Ernle)
- 14 December 1894 – 1902 (res.): Charles Gore (became Bishop of Worcester)
- 3 March 1902 – 1906 (res.): James Welldon (previously Bishop of Calcutta, Metropolitan of India; became Dean of Manchester)
- 16 July 1906 – 17 June 1913 (d.): Samuel Barnett (Canon Steward from 1911)
- 31 July 1913 – 30 January 1931 (d.): Robert Charles (Archdeacon since 1919)
- 27 March 1931 – 29 May 1936 (d.): Percy Dearmer
- 2 September 1936 – 2 August 1938 (res.): Harold Costley-White (also Headmaster until 1936; became Dean of Gloucester)
- 1 October 1938 – 20 June 1940 (d.): William Elliott
- 23 August 1940 – 1941 (ret.): Hensley Henson (retired Bishop of Durham; earlier a canon in Stradling succession)
- 26 December 1941 – 1963 (ret.): Adam Fox (sometime Archdeacon)
- 24 January 1964 – 1 January 1968 (d.): Joost de Blank (previously Archbishop of Cape Town)
- 11 July 1968 – 1 September 1975 (res.): Ronald Jasper (also Archdeacon from 1974; became Dean of York)
- 1976–1987 (res.): Trevor Beeson (Treasurer 1978–1982; Rector of St Margaret's & Speaker's Chaplain from 1982; became Dean of Winchester)
- 1987–1997 (ret.): Colin Semper
- 1997–2004 (ret.): Michael Middleton, Canon Treasurer (also Almoner from 2000; afterwards a canon emeritus)
- 2005 – 31 July 2013 (ret.): Bob Reiss, Canon Treasurer and Almoner (also Sub-Dean from 2011)
- 5 October 2013 – present: David Stanton, Canon Treasurer (since 2013), Almoner (2013–2018), Sub-Dean (since before 21 October 2018) and Archdeacon of Westminster (before 17 June 2018 – before 31 May 2022)

Canons in the succession of Walter Jones

- 5 July 1660 – bef. 1672 (d.): Walter Jones
- 17 July 1672 – 1689 (res.): Simon Patrick (became Bishop of Chichester)
- 17 October 1689 – 2 July 1710 (d.): Peter Birch, Speaker's Chaplain (also Rector of St James's, 1692–1695; Vicar of St Bride's from 1695)
- 17 July 1710 – 27 June 1746 (res.): Lawrence Brodrick
- 11 July 1746 – 29 February 1788 (d.): John Taylor
- 16 April 1788 – 13 November 1827 (d.): Charles Fynes (surnamed Fynes-Clinton after 26 April 1821)
- 8 December 1827 – bef. 1831 (exch.): Thomas Manners-Sutton, Speaker's Chaplain (became Sub-Dean of Lincoln)
- 5 September 1831 – 9 February 1881 (d.): Lord John Thynne (Sub-Dean for 45 years)
- 10 March 1881 – 1883 (res.): Alfred Barry, Principal of King's College London (became Bishop of Sydney, Primate of Australia)
- 2 February 1884 – 30 April 1890 (res.): Brooke Foss Westcott, Regius Professor of Divinity at Cambridge and examining chaplain to Edward White Benson, Archbishop of Canterbury (became Bishop of Durham)

Canonry suspended since 1890.

Canons in the succession of Henry Killigrew

Killigrew had previously been appointed, without effect, to the 12th prebend.

- 5 July 1660 – 14 March 1700 (d.): Henry Killigrew
- 6 April 1700 – 11 August 1724 (d.): Thomas Lynford (Sub-Dean from 1723; also Archdeacon of Barnstaple from 1709)
- 26 August 1724 – 1743 (res.): Edward Willes (became Bishop of St David's)
- 17 March 1743 – 11 August 1759 (d.): John Heylin (also a canon of St Paul's)
- 2 October 1759 – 7 July 1768 (d.): Joseph Atwell
- 6 August 1768 – 1 November 1796 (d.): Charles Wake
- 10 February 1797 – 1799 (res.): George Lukin (became Dean of Wells)
- 1 April 1799 – 5 November 1842 (d.): Thomas Causton (sometime Speaker's Chaplain)

No successor appointed per the Victorian statutes.

Canons in the succession of Richard Busby

- 5 July 1660 – 5 April 1695 (d.): Richard Busby, Headmaster
- 13 April 1695 – 28 February 1702 (res.): Richard Willis (became Dean of Lincoln)
- 31 March – 28 April 1702 (d.): Richard Martin
- 16 June 1702 – 21 August 1732 (d.): Michael Evans
- 4 October 1732 – 1743 (res.): William Barnard (became Dean of Rochester)
- 26 April 1743 – 1748 (res.): Robert Hay Drummond (became Bishop of St Asaph)
- 3 May 1748 – bef. 1758 (res.): Christopher Wilson (became a canon of St Paul's)
- 17 July 1758 – 27 June 1770 (d.): Reeve Ballard
- 4 August 1770 – bef. October 1770 (res.): Benjamin Kennicott (became a canon of Christ Church)
- 31 October 1770 – bef. 1775 (res.): James Cornwallis (became Dean of Canterbury)
- 5 May 1775 – 30 December 1807 (d.): Nathan Wetherell, Master of Univ
- 18 February 1808 – 1809 (res.): Walker King (became Bishop of Rochester)
- 25 February 1809 – 1830 (res.): William Carey (also Headmaster until 1814; held canonry in commendam as Bishop of Exeter from 1820; became Bishop of St Asaph)
- 25 June 1830 – 6 June 1856 (d.): James Henry Monk (held in commendam as Bishop of Gloucester {and Bristol} from 1830)

No successor appointed per the Victorian statutes.

Canons in the succession of John Sudbury

- 14 July 1660 – 1662 (res.): John Sudbury (became Dean of Durham)
- 20 June 1662 – 18 July 1670 (d.): Thomas Triplett
- 30 July 1670 – 23 August 1679 (d.): William Owtram, Archdeacon of Leicester and Rector of St Margaret's
- 20 September 1679 – bef. 1701 (d.): Richard Annesley (The Lord Altham from 1700; also Dean of Exeter from 1681)
- 6 December 1701 – 1 March 1730 (d.): Edward Gee (also Dean of Peterborough, 1721–1722; Dean of Lincoln from 1722; Rector of St Margaret's from 1724)
- 23 May 1730 – 2 April 1739 (res.): Robert Thistlethwaite
- 18 May 1739 – 1743 (res.): Matthew Hutton (became Bishop of Bangor)
- 1 December 1743 – 15 April 1784 (d.): Thomas Wilson
- 7 May 1784 – 1800 (res.): William Cleaver (held in commendam as Bishop of Chester from 1787; became Bishop of Bangor)
- 21 April 1801 – 1802 (res.): William Vincent, Headmaster (became Dean)
- 21 August 1802 – 1815 (res.): John Ireland (Sub-Dean from 1806; became Dean)
- 26 February 1816 – 3 September 1847 (d.): James Webber (also Dean of Ripon from 1828)

No successor appointed per the Victorian statutes.

Canons in the succession of James Lamb

- 23 July 1660 – 18 October 1664 (d.): James Lamb (also Rector of St Andrew, Holborn from 1662)
- 3 November 1664 – 1673 (d.): Richard Perrinchief (also a canon of St Paul's from 1664; also Archdeacon of Huntingdon from 1670)
- 22 September 1673 – 1674 (d.): Richard Colebrand
- 16 September 1674 – 30 June 1694 (d.): Adam Littleton
- 15 September 1694 – 31 January 1722 (d.): Thomas Dent
- 15 February 1722 – bef. 1729 (res.): John Wynne (in commendam; also Bishop of St Asaph until 1727; also Bishop of Bath and Wells from 1727)
- 25 November 1729 – 2 May 1753 (d.): Scawen Kenrick, Speaker's Chaplain (Rector of St Margaret's from 1730; Archdeacon 1734–?; Sub-Dean from 1743)
- 27 April 1754 – 1768 (res.): John Thomas (became Dean)
- 20 July 1768 – 5 February 1784 (d.): William Stockwood
- 13 February 1784 – 1787 (res.): George Pretyman (became Bishop of Lincoln)
- 29 March 1787 – 23 March 1808 (d.): Samuel Smith (also Headmaster until 1788)
- 30 April 1808 – 1822 (res.): Frederick Blomberg (became a canon of St Paul's)
- 1 February 1822 – 7 February 1836 (d.): George Holcombe

From Jennings onwards, the canons in Lamb's stall were ex officio rectors of St John's, Smith Square.

- 19 January 1837 – 26 March 1883 (d.): John Jennings (Archdeacon 1868–1883)
- 19 May 1883 – 2 March 1894 (moved): Charles Furse (father of Charles; afterwards a canon in Mitchel succession)
- 31 March 1894 – 13 May 1916 (d.): Basil Wilberforce (Speaker's Chaplain from 1896; Archdeacon from 1900)
- 11 July 1916 – 19 August 1918 (res.): Henry Gamble (became Dean of Exeter)
- 1918 – 20 January 1926 (res.): Henry de Candole (Treasurer from 1924; became Dean of Bristol)
- 4 March 1926 – 21 March 1933 (res.): Clifford Woodward (became Bishop of Bristol)
- 26 May 1933 – 1941 (res.): Russell Barry (Sub-Dean from 1940; became Bishop of Southwell)

Canonry suspended since 1941; St John's parish united to St Stephen's, Rochester Row on 24 November 1950.

Canons in the succession of David Mitchel

- 25 July 1660 – 1662 (res.): David Mitchel (became Bishop of Aberdeen)
- 23 April 1662 – 1669 (d.): Samuel Bolton, Rector of St Peter le Poer (and, from 1663, of St Leonard, Foster Lane)
- 22 February 1669 – 1683 (res.): Thomas Sprat er (also Rector of St Margaret's from 1679; became Dean)
- 13 October 1683 – 17 June 1693 (d.): Samuel de l'Angle
- 1 July 1693 – 30 January 1697 (d.): Anthony Horneck
- 13 February 1697 – 15 August 1715 (d.): Samuel Barton
- 1715 – 15 November 1724 (d.): John Watson
- 26 November 1724 – 4 April 1725 (d.): Benjamin Ibbot
- 5 May 1725 – 21 September 1730 (d.): Maurice Suckling
- 8 May 1731 – 1744 (res.): Robert Freind (also Headmaster until 1733)
- 17 October 1744 – 1756 (res.): William Freind (became a canon of Christ Church)
- 26 May 1756 – 1757 (res.): Thomas Greene (became Dean of Salisbury)
- 22 March 1757 – 1761 (res.): Thomas Newton (also Canon Precentor of York Minster from 1759; became Bishop of Bristol)
- 19 January 1762 – 26 June 1802 (d.): Joseph Hoare
- 6 July 1802 – 1809 (res.): Gerald Wellesley (afterwards a canon of St Paul's)
- 11 November 1809 – 1864 (res.): William Bentinck, Archdeacon
- 7 November 1864 – 5 October 1868 (d.): Ernest Hawkins
- 11 November 1868 – 13 October 1881 (d.): Francis Leighton

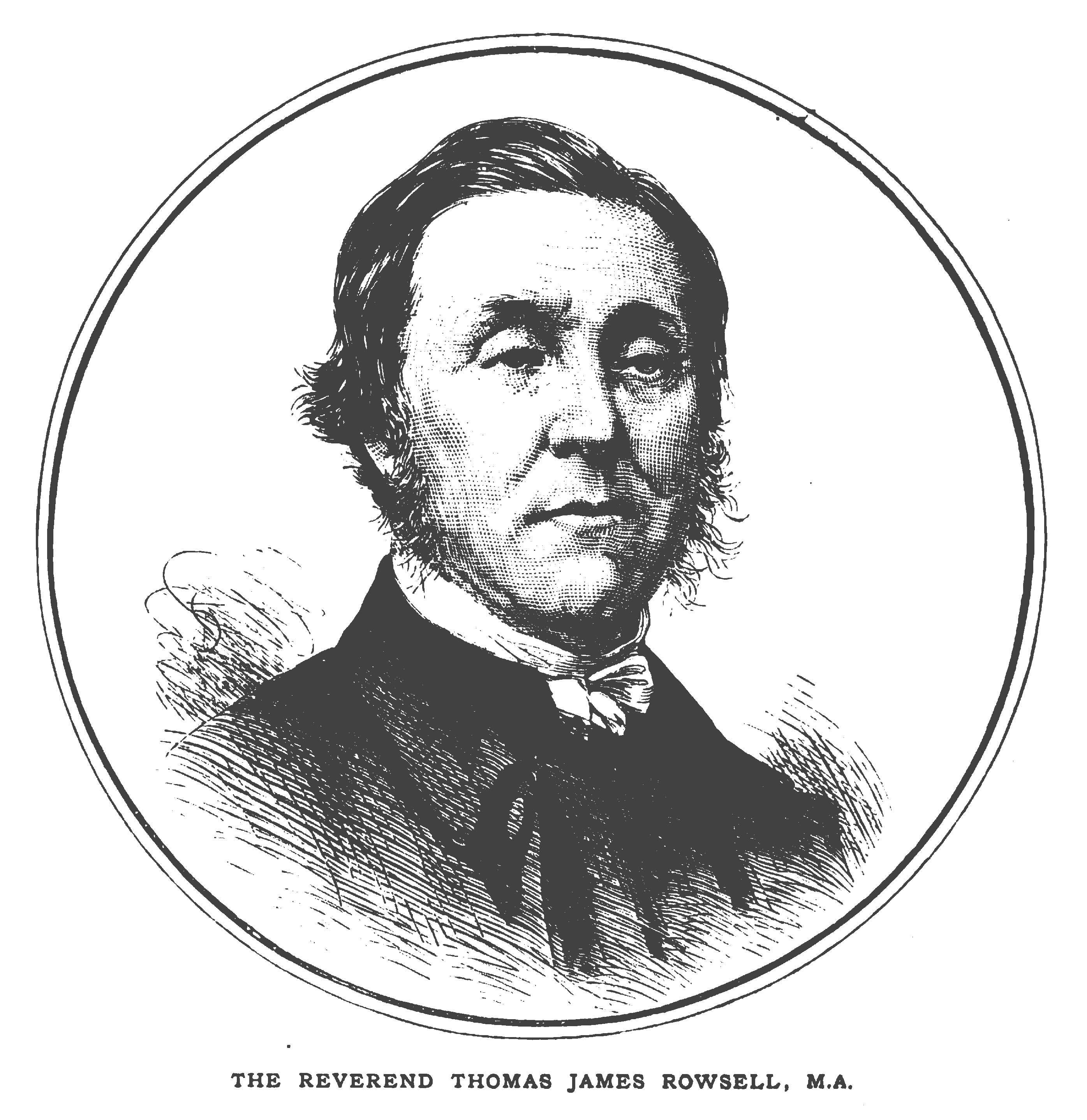
Thomas Rowsell

- 22 November 1881 – 23 January 1894 (d.): Thomas Rowsell
- 2 March 1894 – 2 August 1900 (d.): Charles Furse, Archdeacon (father of Charles; previously a canon in Lamb succession)
- 11 September 1900 – 1902 (res.): Armitage Robinson (previously a canon in Stradling succession; Rector of St Margaret's until 1900; afterwards Dean)
- 23 October 1902 – 15 December 1911 (res.): Henry Beeching (became Dean of Norwich)
- 21 December 1911 – 1919 (res.): Ernest Pearce (Treasurer 1912–1916; Archdeacon 1916–1918; Sub-Dean from 1918; became Bishop of Worcester)
- 27 June 1919 – 1921 (res.): William Temple (became Bishop of Manchester)
- 27 January 1921 – December 1936 (moved): Vernon Storr (Archdeacon from 1931; afterwards a canon in Stradling succession)
- 22 March 1937 – July 1963 (ret.): Stephen Marriott (Archdeacon, 1946–1951 & from 1959; Sub-Dean, 1951–1959)
- 3 May 1963 – 1973 (ret.): Max Warren, Sub-Dean
- 17 September 1973 – 1982 (res.): John Baker (Treasurer 1974–1978; Sub-Dean, Rector of St Margaret's & Speaker's Chaplain from 1978; became Bishop of Salisbury)
- 1982–1999 (ret.): Anthony Harvey (Sub-Dean from 1987; afterwards a canon emeritus)
- 2000–2003 (res.): Tom Wright, Canon Theologian (became Bishop of Durham)
- 2004–2011 (ret.): Nicholas Sagovsky, Canon Theologian (Sub-Dean from 2010)
- 7 May 2011 – 30 September 2018 (ret.): Vernon White, Canon Theologian (since 2011), Sub-Dean and Archdeacon (since 2016)
- 19 January 2019 – present: Jamie Hawkey, Canon Theologian (since 2019) and Almoner (since before 31 May 2021)

Canons in the succession of Francis Walsall

- 1 September 1660 – 1661 (d.): Francis Walsall, Archdeacon of Coventry
- 16 October 1661 – 1667 (d.): Thomas Gorges (also Archdeacon of Winchester until 1666)
- 19 December 1667 – 1675 (d.): Robert Boreman
- 21 November 1675 – 26 January 1708 (d.): Francis Durant de Bréval
- 23 February 1708 – 1723 (res.): Samuel Bradford (held in commendam as Bishop of Carlisle from 1718; became Bishop of Rochester and Dean)
- 14 June 1723 – 25 October 1729 (d.): John Herbert
- 13 November 1729 – 3 August 1732 (d.): Edward Aspinwall
- 2 October 1732 – 27 January 1739 (d.): Richard Bundy
- 12 February 1739 – 1749 (res.): Thomas Hayter (became Bishop of Norwich)
- 9 December 1749 – 1761 (res.): Edward Townshend (became Dean of Norwich)
- 1 April 1761 – 24 June 1782 (d.): John Blair (priest) (also Rector of St John's from 1776)
- 14 August 1782 – 1792 (res.): Thomas Jackson (became a canon of St Paul's)
- 12 May 1792 – 25 September 1806 (d.): William Cole
- 16 October 1806 – 1836 (res.): Joseph Allen (held in commendam as Bishop of Bristol from 1834; became Bishop of Ely)

Vacancy of 2 years.

- 7 November 1838 – 7 July 1859 (d.): Temple Frere, Speaker's Chaplain

No successor appointed per the Victorian statutes.

Canons in the succession of Herbert Thorndike

Thorndike was appointed in succession to Matthew Nicholas, canon formerly of the 5th prebend.

- 5 September 1661 – bef. 1672 (d.): Herbert Thorndike
- 17 July 1672 – 28 September 1724 (d.): Nicholas Only (also Rector of St Margaret's from 1683)
- 17 October 1724 – 14 April 1763 (d.): George Ingram (Viscount of Irvine from 1761)
- 27 April 1763 – bef. 1765 (res.): Philip Lloyd (became Dean of Norwich)
- February 1765 – bef. 1771 (res.): Robert Fowler (became Bishop of Killaloe)
- 27 June 1771 – 5 September 1778 (d.): Thomas Young
- 31 October 1778 – 15 July 1792 (d.): Robert Clive, Archdeacon of Shropshire
- 1 September 1792 – bef. 1797 (res.): Charles Moss (became a canon of St Paul's)
- 18 December 1797 – 14 February 1818 (d.): John Wheler
- 14 March 1818 – 19 July 1833 (d.): William Tournay
- 9 November 1833 – 24 June 1837 (d.): Edward Grey, Bishop of Hereford

No successor appointed per the Victorian statutes.

Canons in the succession of Charles Gibbs

Gibbs was appointed in succession to Peter Heylin, canon formerly of the 6th prebend.

- 21 May 1662 – 16 September 1681 (d.): Charles Gibbs
- 22 October 1681 – bef. 1687 (d.): William Sill
- 13 June 1687 – bef. 1694 (d.): George Berkeley
- 5 November 1694 – bef. 1697 (d.): William Payne
- 5 March 1697 – 29 June 1715 (d.): Richard Lucas
- 1715 – 28 March 1722 (d.): Robert Cannon
- 7 May 1722 – January 1725 (d.): John Mandeville, Dean of Peterborough
- 5 February 1725 – 16 November 1741 (d.): James Hargraves, Rector of St Margaret's (also Dean of Chichester from 1739)
- 30 November 1741 – 17 November 1754 (d.): Richard Bullock
- 13 May 1755 – 1762 (res.): John Oswald
- 1 July 1762 – 1 December 1772 (d.): Charles Burdett
- 26 December 1772 – 16 September 1781 (d.): Thomas Marriott
- 1 November 1781 – 18 May 1803 (d.): Robert Finch, Rector of St John's
- 31 May 1803 – 29 September 1846 (d.): Holland Edwards, Rector of St John's

No successor appointed per the Victorian statutes.

Canons in the succession of Robert South

South was appointed in succession to Benjamin Lany, formerly a canon of the 8th prebend.

- 1663 – 8 July 1716 (d.): Robert South
- 21 July 1716 – 5 September 1740 (d.): Harry Barker
- 6 October 1740 – 19 September 1765 (d.): John Nicoll (also Headmaster until 1753)
- 12 October 1765 – 29 September 1816 (d.): William Bell (also Treasurer of St Paul's from 1766)
- 30 October 1816 – 18 May 1826 (d.): William Short
- 2 June 1826 – bef. 1831 (exch.): Edmund Goodenough (also Headmaster until 1828; became Dean of Wells)
- 4 October 1831 – 31 March 1836 (d.): Henry Ryder, Bishop of Lichfield and Coventry
- 7 November 1838 – 6 August 1860 (d.): Edward Repton
- 1860 – 13 March 1873 (d.): Evan Nepean (also Chaplain-in-Ordinary since 1847)
- 1873 – 23 January 1875 (d.): Charles Kingsley
- 1875 – 20 September 1911 (d.): Robinson Duckworth (Sub-Dean from 16 January 1895)
- 1911 – 26 October 1918 (d.): William Boyd Carpenter, Sub-Dean
- 1918–1924 (res.): Ernest Barnes (became Bishop of Birmingham)
- 1924–1951 (ret.): Frederic Donaldson (Steward, 1927; Treasurer, 1931; Archdeacon, 1937; Receiver-General, 1938; Sub-Dean from 1944; afterwards a canon emeritus)
- 1951–1974 (ret.): Edward Carpenter (Treasurer from 1959; Archdeacon from 1963; became Dean)
- 1975–1987 (ret.): Edward Knapp-Fisher, Archdeacon (Sub-Dean from 1982)
- 1987–1998 (ret.): Donald Gray, Rector of St Margaret's & Speaker's Chaplain (afterwards a canon emeritus)
- 1998–2010 (ret.): Robert Wright, Rector of St Margaret's & Speaker's Chaplain (Sub-Dean from 2005; Archdeacon from 2009; afterwards a canon emeritus)
- 9 October 2010–17 July 2016 (res.): Andrew Tremlett, Rector of St Margaret's (Sub-Dean and Archdeacon from 2014) (Note: Tremlett was appointed Sub-Dean and Archdeacon between 6 July and 3 August 2014.)
- 10 September 2016 – present: Anthony Ball, Canon Steward (2016–2021), and Almoner (before 30 September 2018 – 2021), Rector of St Margaret's (since 2020) also a part-time assistant bishop in Episcopal/Anglican Province of Alexandria, 2021–2023, and Bishop of North Africa since 2023.

Canons in the succession of George Stradling

Stradling was appointed in succession to William Haywood, canon formerly of the 11th prebend.

- 30 July 1663 – 18 April 1688 (d.): George Stradling (also Dean of Chichester from 1672)
- 17 May 1688 – bef. 1713 (d.): James Sartre
- 1713 – 10 May 1720 (d.): Thomas Sprat yr (son of the late Dean)
- 9 June 1720 – 19 February 1721 (d.): William Craig
- 4 March 1721 – 1731 (res.): Joseph Wilcocks (held in commendam as Bishop of Gloucester from December 1721; became Dean)
- 7 July 1731 – 31 May 1742 (d.): Alured Clarke (also Dean of Exeter from 1741)
- 28 June 1742 – bef. 1748 (res.): John Hume (became a canon of St Paul's)
- 9 April 1748 – 15 June 1777(d.): Edward Crane
- 17 July 1777 – July 1793 (d.): Nicholas Boscawen
- 22 August 1793 – bef. 1807 (res.): Thomas Hughes (became a canon of St Paul's)
- 27 February 1807 – 19 March 1819 (d.): William Douglas
- 24 April 1819 – 27 January 1832 (d.): Andrew Bell
- 22 February 1832 – 26 January 1835 (d.): Evelyn Sutton
- 11 April 1835 – November 1849 (res.): Henry Hart Milman, Rector of St Margaret's (became Dean of St Paul's)

In 1836 (during Milman's tenure), the canons in succession to Stradling were made ex officio rectors of St Margaret's, Westminster (then a parish in the Diocese of London).

- 15 December 1849 – 15 June 1864 (d.): William Cureton
- 1864 – 22 March 1876 (d.): William Conway, Rector of St Margaret's (father of Lord Conway of Allington)
- 9 May 1876 – 1895 (res.): Frederic Farrar (Archdeacon from 24 April 1883; Speaker's Chaplain from 1890; became Dean of Canterbury)
- 1895 – January 1899 (ret.): Robert Eyton
- 1899–1900 (moved): Armitage Robinson (afterwards a canon in Mitchel succession)
- 1900–1912 (res.): Hensley Henson (Sub-Dean from 1911; later a canon in Doughty succession)
- 1913 – 18 October 1936 (d.): William Hartley Carnegie (Speaker's Chaplain 1916 onwards; Archdeacon 1918–1919; Sub-Dean from 1919)
- December 1936 – 25 October 1940 (d.): Vernon Storr, Sub-Dean (previously a canon in Mitchel succession)
- 1941–1946 (res.): Alan Don (also Speaker's Chaplain since 1936; became Dean)
- 1946–1956 (res.): Charles Smyth
- 1957–1969 (res.): Michael Stancliffe (also Speaker's Chaplain from 1961)
- 1970–1978 (res.): David Edwards (also Speaker's Chaplain from 1972; Sub-Dean from 1974)

The arrangement whereby the canon in this succession was also Rector of St Margaret's appears to have ended in 1978, when Charles was appointed in succession to Edwards but not made Rector; the parish had been broken up and dissolved and the church returned to the Abbey's care by the Westminster Abbey and Saint Margaret Westminster Act 1972.

- 8 September 1978 – 28 October 1989 (d.): Sebastian Charles, Canon Steward (Treasurer from 1982)
- 1990–1994 (ret.): Paul Bates
- 1995–2005 (ret.): David Hutt, Canon Steward (Archdeacon & Sub-Dean from 1999; afterwards a canon emeritus)
- 2006 – 21 June 2014 (res.): Jane Hedges, Canon Steward (Archdeacon 2006–2009 & 2010–2014; Sub-Dean 2013–2014)
- 7 September 2014 – 30 April 2020 (ret.): Jane Sinclair, Rector of St Margaret's (from 1 September 2016; previously Canon Steward)
- 9 May 2021 – present: Tricia Hillas, Canon Steward and Archdeacon of Westminster (since before 31 May 2021); also Chaplain to the Speaker of the House of Commons (since 4 March 2020)

== Sources ==
- Horn, Joyce M. (1992), Fasti Ecclesiae Anglicanae 1541–1857, vol. 7, p. 72
- Horn, Joyce M. (1992), Fasti Ecclesiae Anglicanae 1541–1857, vol. 7, pp. 72–73
- Horn, Joyce M. (1992), Fasti Ecclesiae Anglicanae 1541–1857, vol. 7, pp. 73–74
- Horn, Joyce M. (1992), Fasti Ecclesiae Anglicanae 1541–1857, vol. 7, pp. 74–75
- Horn, Joyce M. (1992), Fasti Ecclesiae Anglicanae 1541–1857, vol. 7, pp. 75–76
- Horn, Joyce M. (1992), Fasti Ecclesiae Anglicanae 1541–1857, vol. 7, pp. 76–77
- Horn, Joyce M. (1992), Fasti Ecclesiae Anglicanae 1541–1857, vol. 7, pp. 77–78
- Horn, Joyce M. (1992), Fasti Ecclesiae Anglicanae 1541–1857, vol. 7, pp. 78–79
- Horn, Joyce M. (1992), Fasti Ecclesiae Anglicanae 1541–1857, vol. 7, pp. 79–80
- Horn, Joyce M. (1992), Fasti Ecclesiae Anglicanae 1541–1857, vol. 7, pp. 80–81
- Horn, Joyce M. (1992), Fasti Ecclesiae Anglicanae 1541–1857, vol. 7, pp. 81–82
- Horn, Joyce M. (1992), Fasti Ecclesiae Anglicanae 1541–1857, vol. 7, pp. 82–83
- Horn, Joyce M. (1992), Fasti Ecclesiae Anglicanae 1541–1857, vol. 7, pp. 83–97
- Horn, Joyce M. (1992), Fasti Ecclesiae Anglicanae 1541–1857, vol. 7, p. 98
