= Walter Jones =

Walter Jones may refer to:

== Arts and entertainment ==
- Walter Jones (actor, born 1874) (1874–1922), American stage and film actor
- Walter Emanuel Jones (born 1966), American actor who played the Black Ranger in the Mighty Morphin Power Rangers

== Politicians ==
- Walter Jones (MP for Worcester) (c. 1550–1632), English politician
- Walter Jones (Virginia politician) (1745–1815), American Representative from Virginia from 1797–1799, and 1803–1811
- Walter Jones (Irish politician) (1754–1839), MP for Coleraine 1798–1800, 1801–06 and 1807–09
- Walter Jones (Australian politician) (1885–1924), Australian politician
- Walter Burgwyn Jones (1888–1963), American legislator, writer, and judge
- Walter H. Jones (New Jersey politician) (1912–1982), American Republican Party politician
- Walter B. Jones Sr. (1913–1992), US Representative from North Carolina, 1965–1992
- Walter B. Jones Jr. (1943–2019), US Representative from North Carolina, 1995–2019

== Religion ==
- Walter Jones (priest) (died 1577), Welsh Anglican priest
- Walter H. Jones (bishop) (1928–2003), American Episcopal bishop

== Science ==
- Walter B. Jones (geologist) (1895–1977), American geologist and archaeologist
- Walter Jennings Jones (1865–1935), American biochemist

== Sports ==
- Walter Jones (polo player) (1866–1932), British polo competitor at the 1908 Summer Olympics
- Walter Jones (Northern Irish footballer) (1925–2020), Northern Irish professional footballer
- Walter Jones (sailor) (1926–2007), Bermudian sailor
- Wali Jones (born 1942), American former basketball player
- Walter Jones (American football) (born 1974), American former football player

== Others ==
- Walter Dally Jones (1855–1926), British soldier
- Sir Walter Jones, 2nd Baronet (1880–1967), British industrialist

== See also ==
- Wally Jones (disambiguation)
