= Smith Square Hall =

Concert hall in London, England

Coordinates: 51°29′45.6″N 0°07′37.6″W

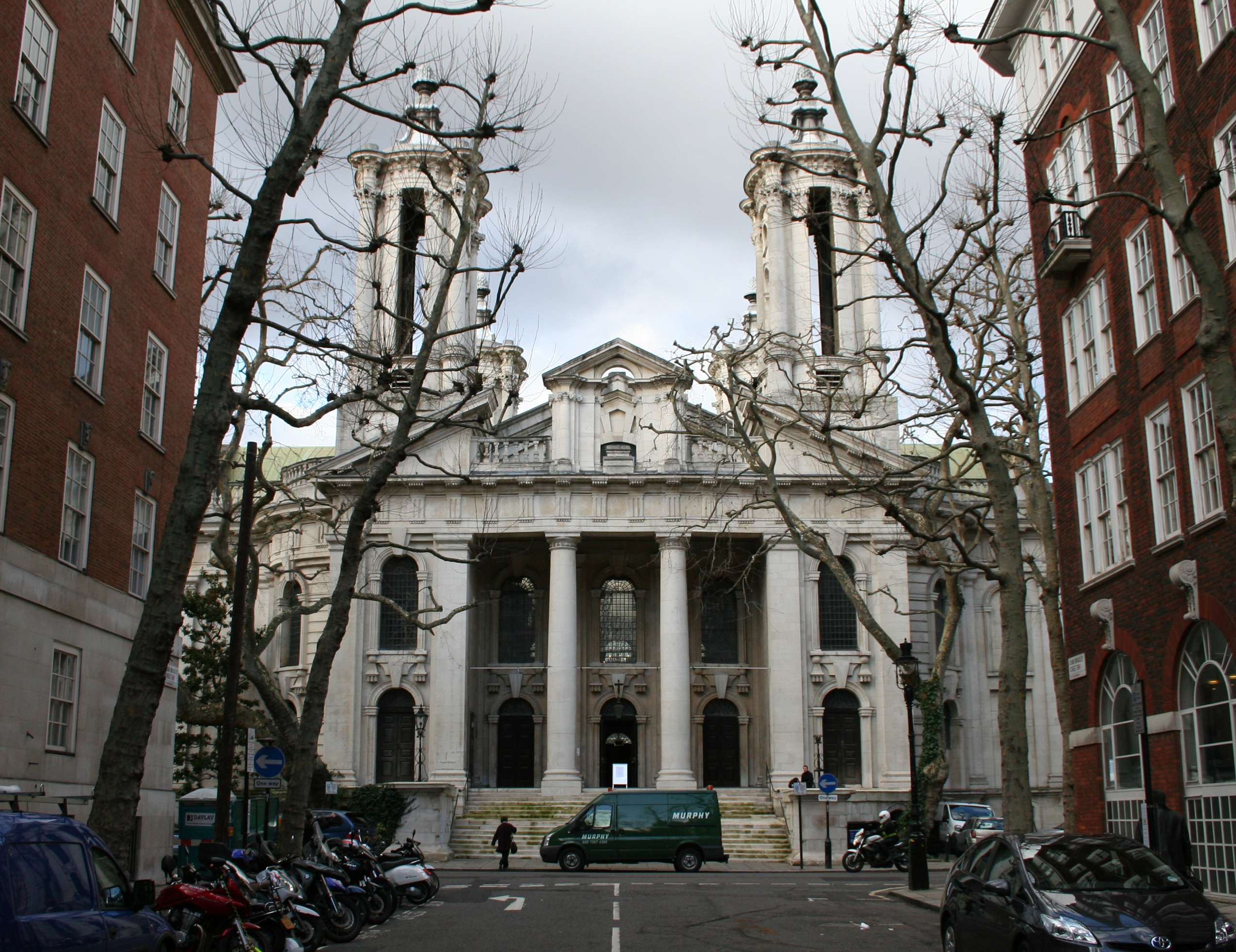
- Smith Square Hall as seen from Dean Bradley Street
- Smith Square Hall
- OS grid reference: TQ 30111 79111
- Location: Smith Square, Westminster, London
- Country: England
- Website: https://www.sinfoniasmithsq.org.uk/

History
- Dedication: St John the Evangelist
- Events: Firebombed 10 May 1941

Architecture
- Functional status: Concert hall
- Architect: Thomas Archer
- Style: English Baroque
- Completed: 1728

Smith Square Hall (formerly St John's Smith Square) is a concert hall in the centre of Smith Square, Westminster, London. Its name was changed by its current operator, Sinfonia Smith Square, in 2024.

Originally a church, this Grade I listed building was designed by Thomas Archer and was completed in 1728 as one of the so-called Fifty New Churches. It is regarded as one of the finest works of English Baroque architecture, and features four corner towers and monumental broken pediments. It is often referred to as 'Queen Anne's Footstool' because as legend has it, when Archer was designing the church he asked the Queen what she wanted it to look like. She kicked over her footstool and said 'Like that!', giving rise to the building's four corner towers.

Ruined following firebombing in the Second World War, it was sold to a charitable trust and restored as a concert hall.

== History ==
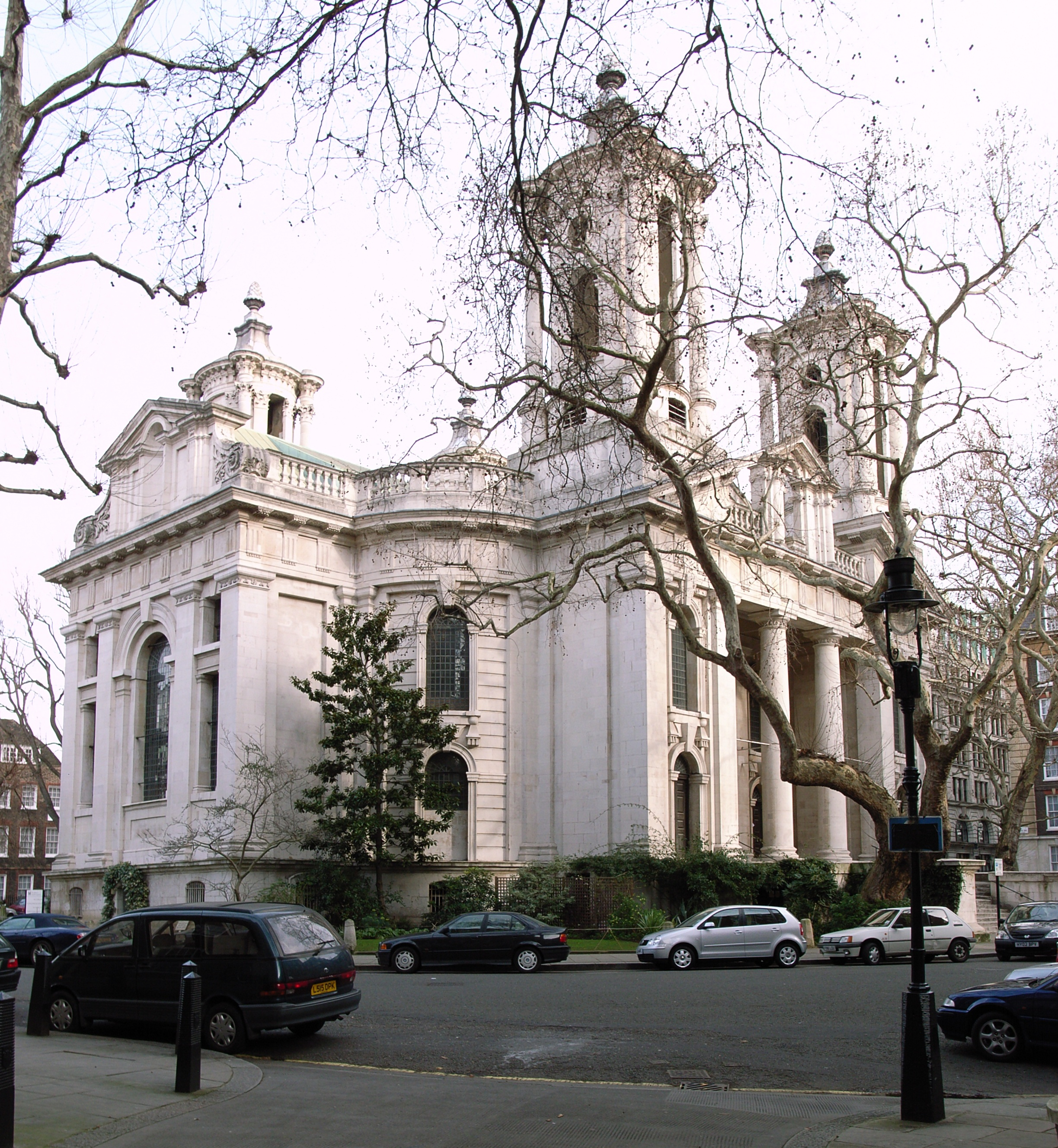
Smith Square Hall

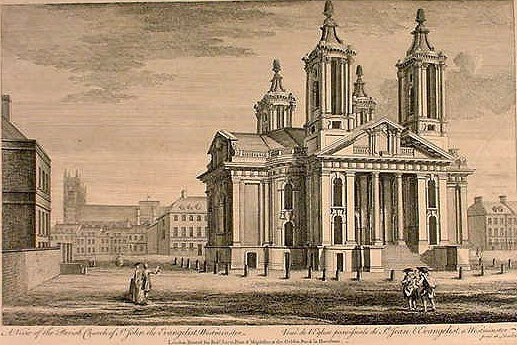
St John's, Smith Square, in the 18th century

In 1710, the long period of Whig domination of British politics ended as the Tories swept to power under the rallying cry of "The Church in Danger". Under the Tories' plan to strengthen the position of the Anglican Church and in the face of widespread damage to church buildings after a storm in November 1710, Parliament concluded that 50 new churches would be necessary in the cities of London and Westminster. An Act of Parliament in 1711 levied a tax on coal imports into the Port of London to fund the scheme and appointed a commission to oversee the project. Archer was appointed to this commission alongside, amongst others, Hawksmoor, Vanburgh and Wren. The site for St John's was acquired from Henry Smith (who was also Treasurer to the Commissioners) in June 1713 for £700 and building commenced immediately. However, work proceeded slowly and the church was finally completed and consecrated in 1728. In total, the building had cost £40,875. The church was built by Edward Strong the Younger a friend of Christopher Wren the Younger.

The famous nickname 'Queen Anne's Footstool' was coined early in its history. According to legend, Archer consulted the ailing Queen Anne about his designs for the new church. The Queen, not noted for her interest in architecture, petulantly kicked over her footstool, pointed at its upturned shape and snapped "Like that!" The towers were, in fact, added to stabilise the building against subsidence.

In 1939, the church was the site of the wedding of Randolph Churchill, the son of Winston Churchill to Pamela Digby. The wedding attracted large crowds, and a great deal of media attention both in the UK and in the United States.

For 213 years, the Church of St John the Evangelist served the surrounding parish – although the life of the building appears somewhat accident-prone. In 1742 (the year before Archer's death) its interior was damaged by fire and required extensive restoration; in 1773 it was struck by lightning and in 1815 the towers and roof had to be shored up. Finally on 10 May 1940, the church was directly hit by an incendiary bomb and gutted by fire during a bombing raid. A handwritten account of the events of that night hangs in a frame at the top of the stairs leading from the rear of the hall down to the Crypt (now the Footstool Restaurant). Subsequently, the church stood a ruin, open to the sky, for over 20 years.

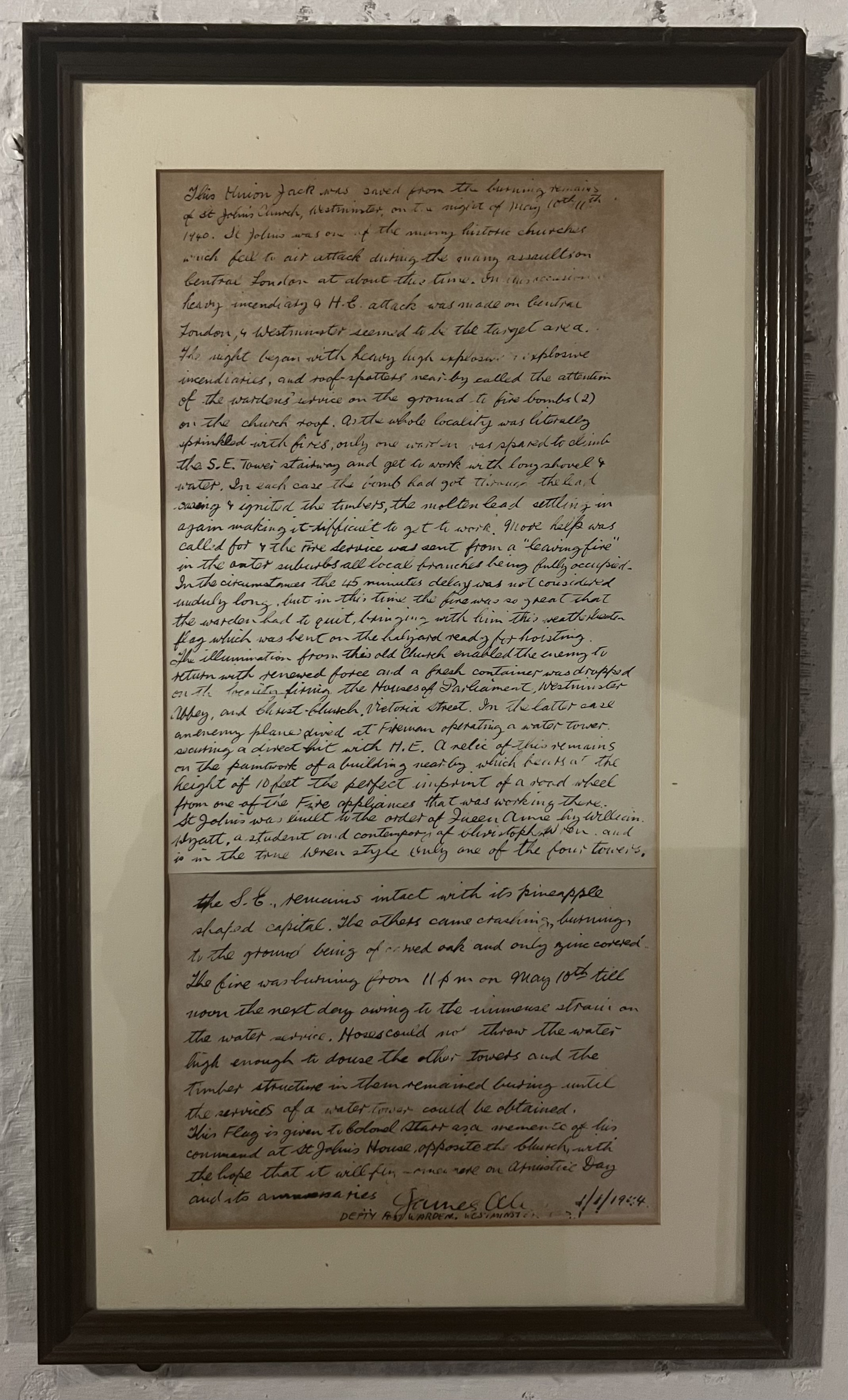
Picture of handwritten note describing the bombing in 1940 of St John's, Smith Square

Restoration of the building began in 1965 and it reopened as a concert hall in 1969 (see Restoration as a concert hall below).

In 2021 the charity running St John’s Smith Square merged with the orchestra Southbank Sinfonia. In 2024 the building was renamed Smith Square Hall.

== Rectors of St John's, Smith Square ==
Under the Ecclesiastical Commissioners Act 1840, the rectory of St John's was annexed to the canonry of Westminster Abbey held by John Jennings, such that Jennings and his successors as Canon would be Rector ipso facto.

- 1728–1730† Edward Gee (as Dean of Lincoln; not formally appointed to rectory)
- 1730–1735 John Villa
- 1736–1743 Edward Willes (as Dean of Lincoln, Bishop of St David's 1743, later Bishop of Bath & Wells)
- 1743–1776† Joseph Simms
- 1776–1782† John Blair
- 1782–1803† Robert Poole Finch
- 1803–1807 William Vincent (as Dean of Westminster)
- 1807–1832 Howell Holland Edwards
- 1832–1883† John Jennings (as Archdeacon of Westminster from 1868)
- 1883–1894 Charles Wellington Furse (later Archdeacon of Westminster)
- 1894–1916† Basil Wilberforce (as Speaker's Chaplain from 1896, Archdeacon of Westminster from 1900)
- 1916–1918 Henry Gamble (later Dean of Exeter)
- 1918–1926 Henry de Candole (later Dean of Bristol)
- 1926–1933 Clifford Woodward (later Bishop of Bristol then Gloucester)
- 1933–1941 Russell Barry (later Bishop of Southwell)

† Rector died in post

The church was gutted by bombing in 1941. The canonry at Westminster was suspended on Russell Barry's resignation to become Bishop of Southwell. The parish of St John's was united with St Stephen's, Rochester Row, on 24 November 1950.

== Architecture ==
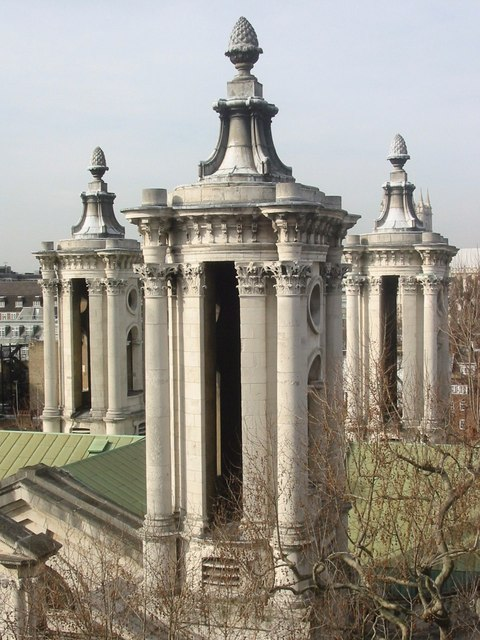
The towers of St John's, Smith Square

The architectural style of St John's, Smith Square, has always provoked a reaction in the viewer, not always complimentary. An 18th-century commentator thought the new church "singular, not to say whimsical" and, later, Charles Dickens, in Our Mutual Friend, described it as appearing to be "some petrified monster, frightful and gigantic, on its back with its legs in the air". However today St John's is regarded as one of the masterpieces of English Baroque architecture.

The building was designed by Thomas Archer (1668–1743). We know that his family were country gentry, but nothing is known about his architectural training. After the usual education for a cultivated young gentleman – three years at Oxford followed by the Grand Tour of Europe – he made his way as a courtier being appointed to the post of Groom Porter by Queen Anne in 1705. As such, he was responsible for licensing all gambling at court (including tennis, dice and billiards). He retained this post for the rest of his life under her successors George I and George II and, in addition, acquired the sinecure of Comptroller of Customs of Newcastle in 1715. Not surprisingly, he became a wealthy man and on his death he left a legacy of £100,000 to his nephew in addition to property in London, Hampshire and Warwickshire. Possibly as a result of this wealth and the distractions of Court life, his architectural output was small – including some work at Chatsworth; Roehampton House (part of Queen Mary's Hospital, until converted to flats in 2009–13); St Philip's Church, Birmingham (now the cathedral), and St Paul's Church, Deptford. However, the idiosyncratic personal style, which is the hallmark of St John's, distinguishes all of his work. While his contemporaries included Vanbrugh and Hawksmoor, Archer's style owes most to the Italian influences he experienced on his Grand Tour, primarily that of Borromini.

Writing in 1981, Sir Hugh Casson describes the building thus:

The plan is squarish and almost symmetrical, but like all Baroque churches the interlocking pattern of the internal spaces is ambiguous, so that you can "see" and comprehend the church centrally or longitudinally as you prefer. The outside is such a turmoil of movement that you could almost say there are no walls or windows ... only a composition of classical elements, columns and cornices, moulded pediments and heavily modelled towers ... Archer handles all this with an energy, courage and confidence which is irresistible. Admittedly, it looks a bit too large for the space it occupies – rather like some great piece of machinery that has been parked in this tiny domestic little square of brick-faced houses and white sash-windows. But this architectural outsize swagger is part of its fascination. It positively challenges you to take it on full-face (and on all four faces). Once up the grand steps and through the doors the contrast is complete. All within is quiet simplicity – a lofty, spacious emptiness filled with a pale, clear light (there is no stained glass) – white walls contrasting with a scarlet curtain and a dark, polished timber gallery, giant white-painted Corinthian columns carrying a simple barrel-vaulted roof... It's all as cool and quiet and evocative as the inside of a seashell. But there's another surprise to come. Beneath the church and reached by stone spiral stairs in the corner tower is another architectural mood ... the crypt. Low brick vaults – hardly more than head-high – a sense of weight and gravity ... (no wonder, under the weight of so much masonry, the church began to sink into its marshy site while it was still building).

== Restoration as a concert hall ==
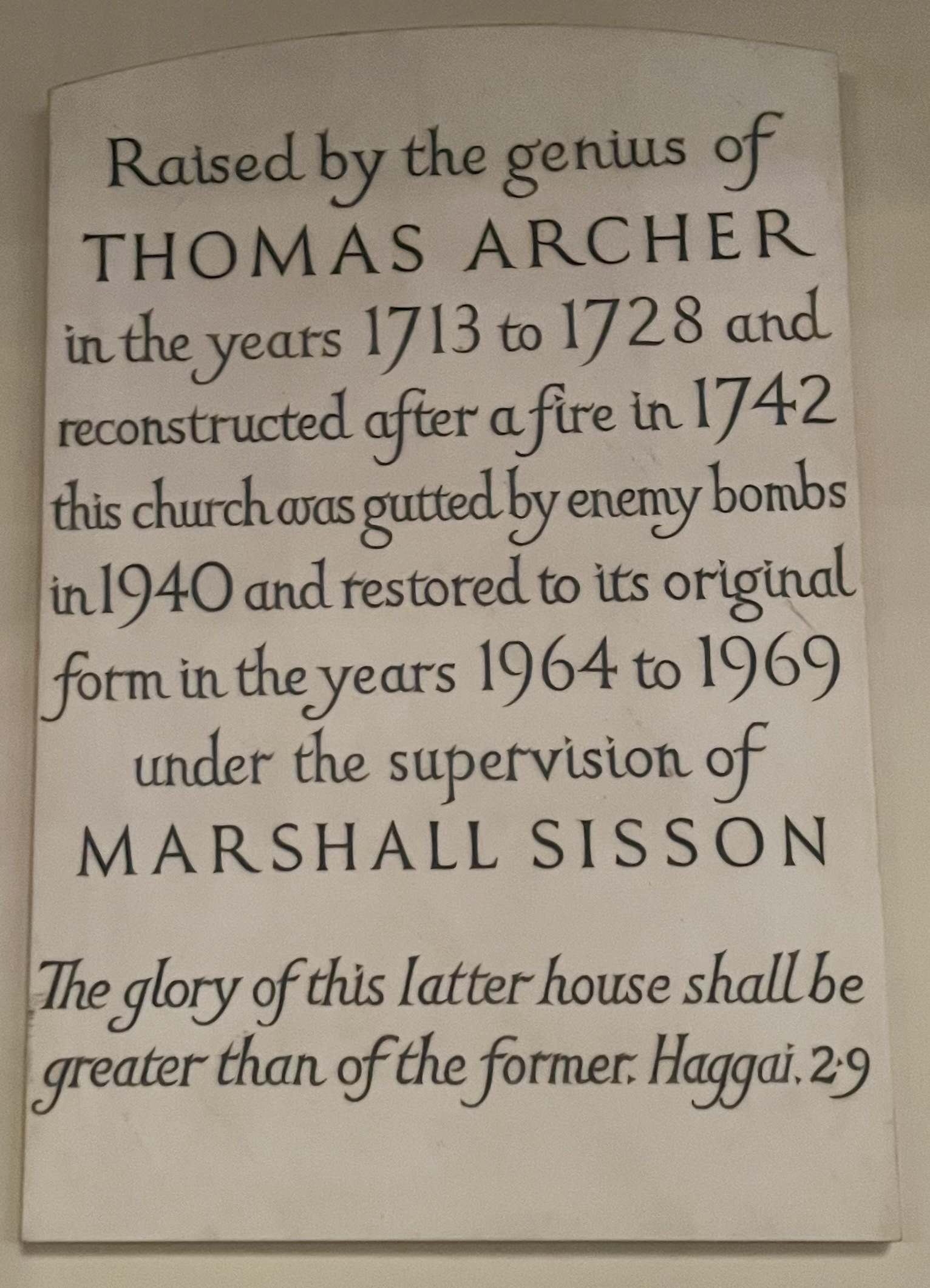
Commemorative plaque discussing the early history of John Smith’s Square

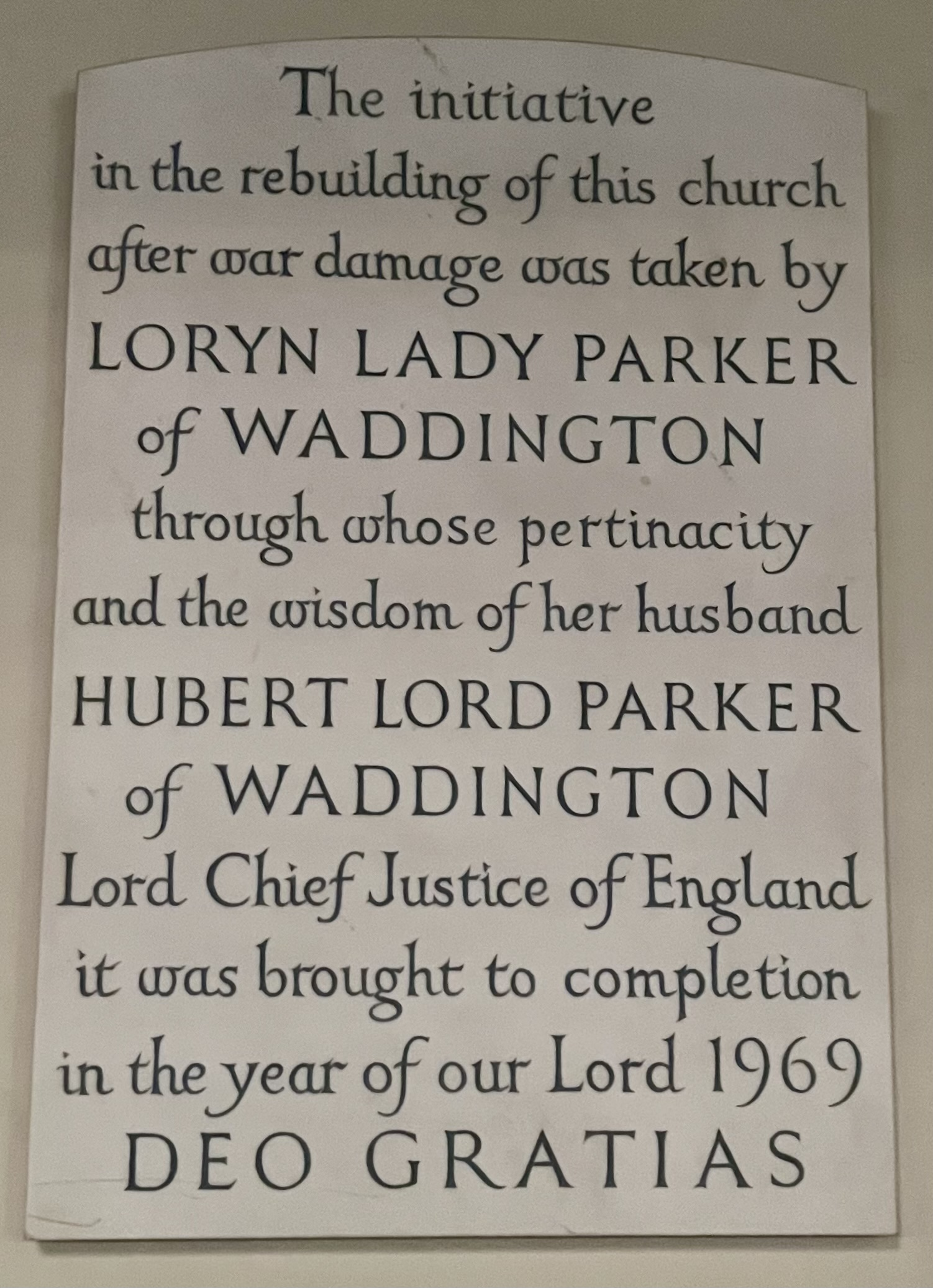
Commemorative plaque discussing the restoration of John Smith’s Square

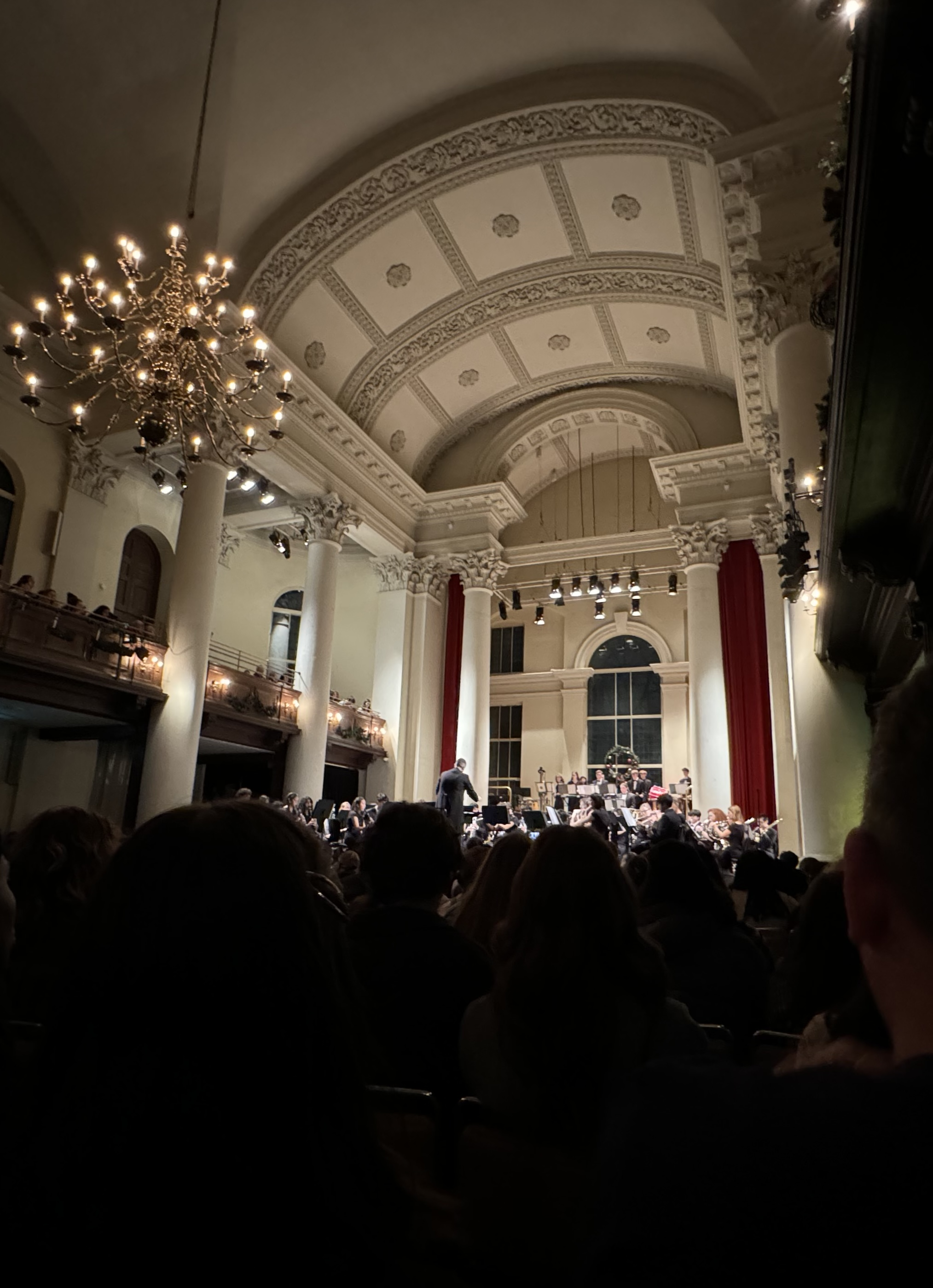
Picture of concert at Smith Square Hall

The building was saved by the determination of Lady Parker of Waddington, commemorated by a plaque on the South wall of the hall. She formed the Friends of St John's in 1962 to raise money and restore the church to its former splendour and to Thomas Archer's original design for use as a concert hall. Work began in 1965 and the inaugural recital was given on 6 October 1969 by Dame Joan Sutherland and Richard Bonynge. The ex-cellist Eleanor Warren organised a series of BBC broadcasts from the restored church. She identified that it was an ideal venue for radio concerts. One of its advantages was its distance from traffic noise including underground trains. Each Monday lunchtime the music concerts would be broadcast on BBC Radio.

Since its rebirth as a concert venue, Smith Square Hall has come to be regarded as one of London's major concert halls. Its acoustic is suitable for nearly all forms of music and the versatility of its space enables it to accommodate a range of music. The hall's concert season begins in mid-September and continues to the following July/August, hosting concerts by internationally renowned singers and chamber musicians; solo instrumentalists; professional chamber orchestras and choirs, amateur choirs and orchestras (both adults and schools) as well as popular music artists.

Smith Square Hall receives no state or local authority subsidy. It relies entirely on income from concerts and recordings, and also on the generosity of charitable trusts, companies and individuals to survive and to develop its facilities. In 1986 an Appeal was launched to raise funds to commission and install a new concert organ using the antique organ case (built by Jordan, Byfield and Bridges in 1734) donated by Sir Duncan Oppenheim. After many donations and two Gala Concerts, the project reached a successful conclusion in 1993. The organ, built by Johannes Klais of Bonn, was named "The Sainsbury Organ" in recognition of the generosity of the Sainsbury family who made a highly significant contribution to the appeal.

In March 1999, after 10 months of being shrouded in scaffolding, the major project to clean the exterior of the hall and repair stonework was completed. The National Heritage Lottery Fund made a substantial contribution to the costs of this essential maintenance work with partnership funding being donated by various trusts and companies. The 30th anniversary of St John's Smith Square was celebrated on 6 October 1999 with a Gala Concert, profits from which also contributed to the building restoration fund.

Smith Square appears briefly as a concert hall in the film An Education, released in 2009. This is anachronistic, however, since the film is set in the early 1960s before St John's was restored. It is the venue for the wedding of Lola Quincey and Paul Marshall in the film Atonement in 2007.

== Access ==
Until September 2010, Smith Square Hall had no access or facilities for disabled people and was not easily accessible to the elderly. The sole access to the church from the exterior was by 14 steps – too steep for ramps. Interior access was again by steps either to the restaurant or the hall. A scheme was put in place to remedy this, the main elements of which involved the installation of a lift to serve the ground, crypt (box office and restaurant) and concert levels. The box office and main entrance foyer were relocated to the area near to the lift, providing a new and more attractive and prominent shared point of entry for all. Adapted lavatories were also provided in the crypt. The artists’ dressing rooms also relocated allowing more direct access to the stage. A platform lift is also available, allowing disabled performers to gain access to the stage level.

== Crypt ==
Access to the crypt is by way of stairs from the main portico steps or via the spiral staircase towards the rear of the hall. This part of the building was not damaged by the wartime bombing, so the brickwork is the original 18th century. Unlike other notable churches of the period (for example Christ Church, Spitalfields, whose crypt was excavated by archaeologists in the 1980s yielding much information about the 18th-century inhabitants of the parish), that of St John's was never used for burials. In fact, for most of the 18th and 19th centuries, the space was let for storage of wines and beer.

== Burial ground ==
The church's burial ground is situated in Horseferry Road, next to the former Westminster Hospital buildings. The site is now designated St John's Gardens and the remaining grave-slabs, now much eroded, are arranged around the perimeter of the garden.
