= Berkhamsted School =

Independent day school in England

Coordinates: 51°45′28″N 00°34′05″W

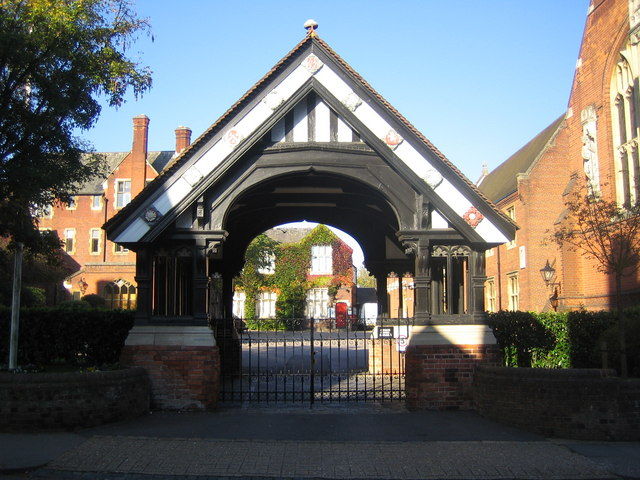
- The Lych Gate and Gravel Quad of the School

Location
- Kings Road; Berkhamsted, Hertfordshire, HP4 3BG; England

Information
- Type: Private day school Public school
- Motto: Virtus laudata crescit ("greatness increases with praise"); Festina lente ("hurry slowly")
- Religious affiliation: Church of England
- Established: 1997 (as presently constituted); 1541 (original foundation)
- Founder: John Incent
- Department for Education URN: 117604 Tables
- Principal: Martin Walker
- Gender: Mixed
- Age: 3 to 18
- Enrollment: 1850 (approx.)
- Houses: Adders, Ashby, Bartrum, Bees, Burgh, Churchill, Cox's, Fry's, Greenes, Hawks, Holme, Loxwood, Nash, New Stede, Old Stede, Reeves, Russell, School, Spencer, St George's, St David's, Stephenson, Swifts, Tilman, Tudor, Wolstenholme
- Colours: Blue, Red and White
- Former pupils: Old Berkhamstedians
- Last inspected: 2025
- Website: http://www.berkhamsted.com

Berkhamsted School is a public school, in the market town of Berkhamsted, in Hertfordshire, England. The present school was formed in 1997 by the amalgamation of the original Berkhamsted School, founded in 1541 by John Incent, Dean of St Paul's Cathedral under charter from King Henry VIII, Berkhamsted School for Girls, established in 1888, and Berkhamsted Preparatory School. The merged school was initially called Berkhamsted Collegiate School, but reverted to Berkhamsted School in 2008. In 2011 Berkhamsted School merged with Heatherton House School, a girls' preparatory school in Amersham, to form the Berkhamsted Schools Group. The Group acquired Haresfoot School in Berkhamsted and its on-site day nursery in 2012, which became Berkhamsted Pre-Preparatory School for children aged three to seven, and Berkhamsted Day Nursery.

Berkhamsted School is a "diamond school" in which pupils are taught coeducationally in the Pre-Prep School, Prep School and Sixth Form, but separately in the traditional Senior years, between the ages of 11 and 16. The school has four main sites: the Pre-Prep School, the Prep School, the Castle Street Campus, and Kings Road Campus (the latter two being the original boys' and girls' schools respectively).

The school has a collegiate and pastoral structure. Students receive sporting, outdoor education and cultural co-curricular programmes along with activities in the local community. Richard Backhouse, previously principal of Monkton Combe School, became principal of the school in January 2016.

Notable alumni, known as 'Old Berkhamstedians', include Graham Greene, KSI, Roman Kemp, Clementine Churchill, Sir Robin Knox-Johnston and Zaha Hadid.

== House system ==
The school uses the house system.

=== Senior boys' houses ===
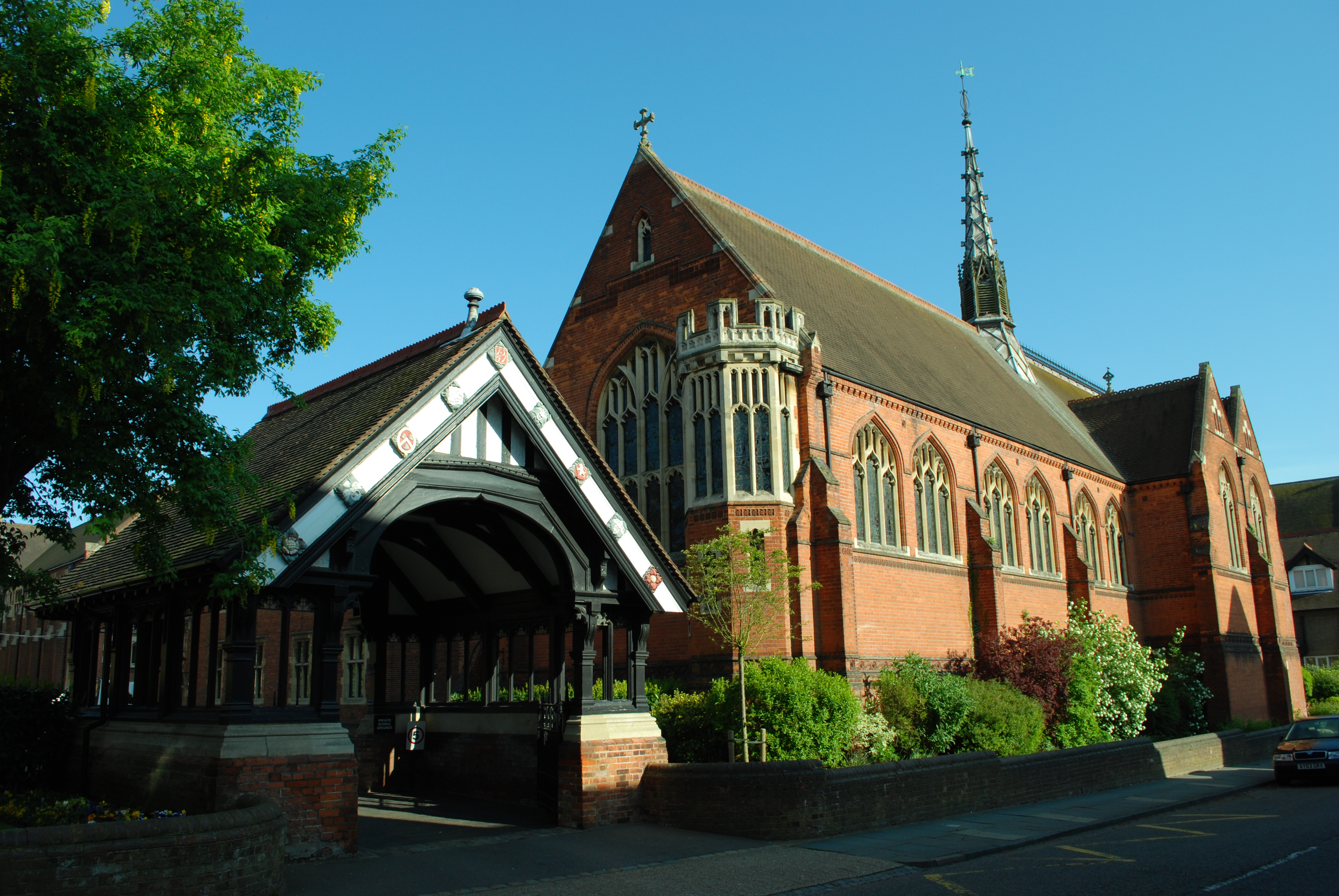
Lychgate and chapel of the Castle Street Campus (formerly the Boys' School)

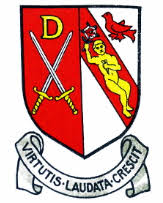
Berkhamsted School coat of arms

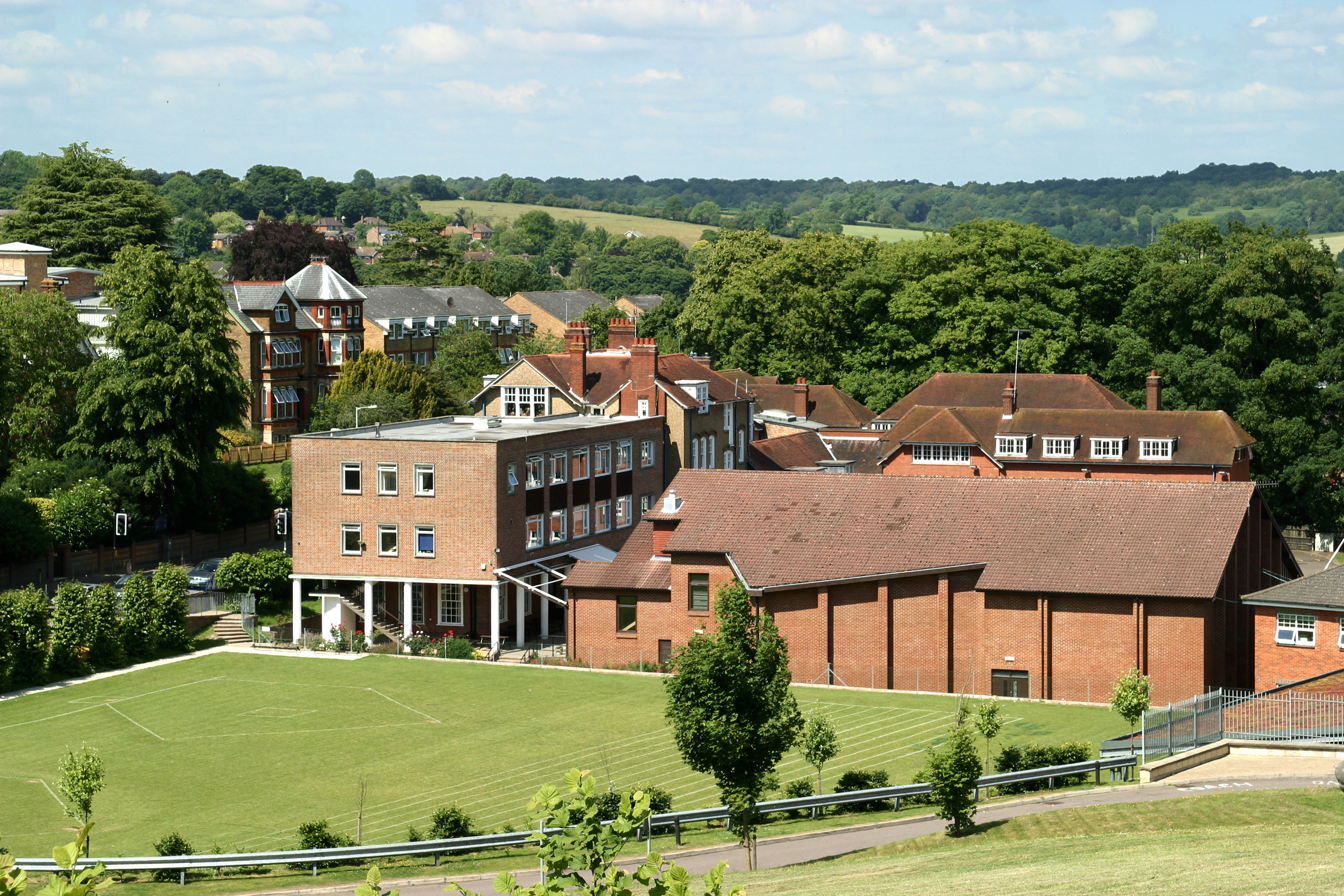
Kings Campus (formerly the Girls' School)

- Adders was formed in 1915 to accommodate the so-called "train boys" who, by nature of their daily commute to school, were often excluded from school activities.
- Bartrum, the newest house, founded in 2019.
- Bees, dating back to 1897 and situated on Mill Street next to Swifts.
- Cox's, opened in 1958 in response to the growing numbers of day boys.
- Fry's is named after one of Berkhamsted's former headmasters, Thomas Charles Fry.
- Greenes, found along the cloisters of the Grass Quad. The School's association with the Greene family is recognised in its name.
- Loxwood, also found along the cloisters. This house was named after a former girls' school house.
- Swifts, established at the same time as Bees.
- Tilman (formerly Incents), until September 2010, was both a boarding and day boy house. The boarding accommodation is situated along Chesham Road, and is the birthplace of Graham Greene.

=== Senior girls' houses ===
- Holme
- New Stede
- Old Stede
- Russell
- St David's
- Stephenson, founded in 2017, named in honour of microbiologist and biochemist Marjory Stephenson.
- Wolstenholme, founded in 2011, named after Sue Wolstenholme who was a school governor for 35 years.

== History of Berkhamsted School, 1541–1996 ==
=== Founding ===
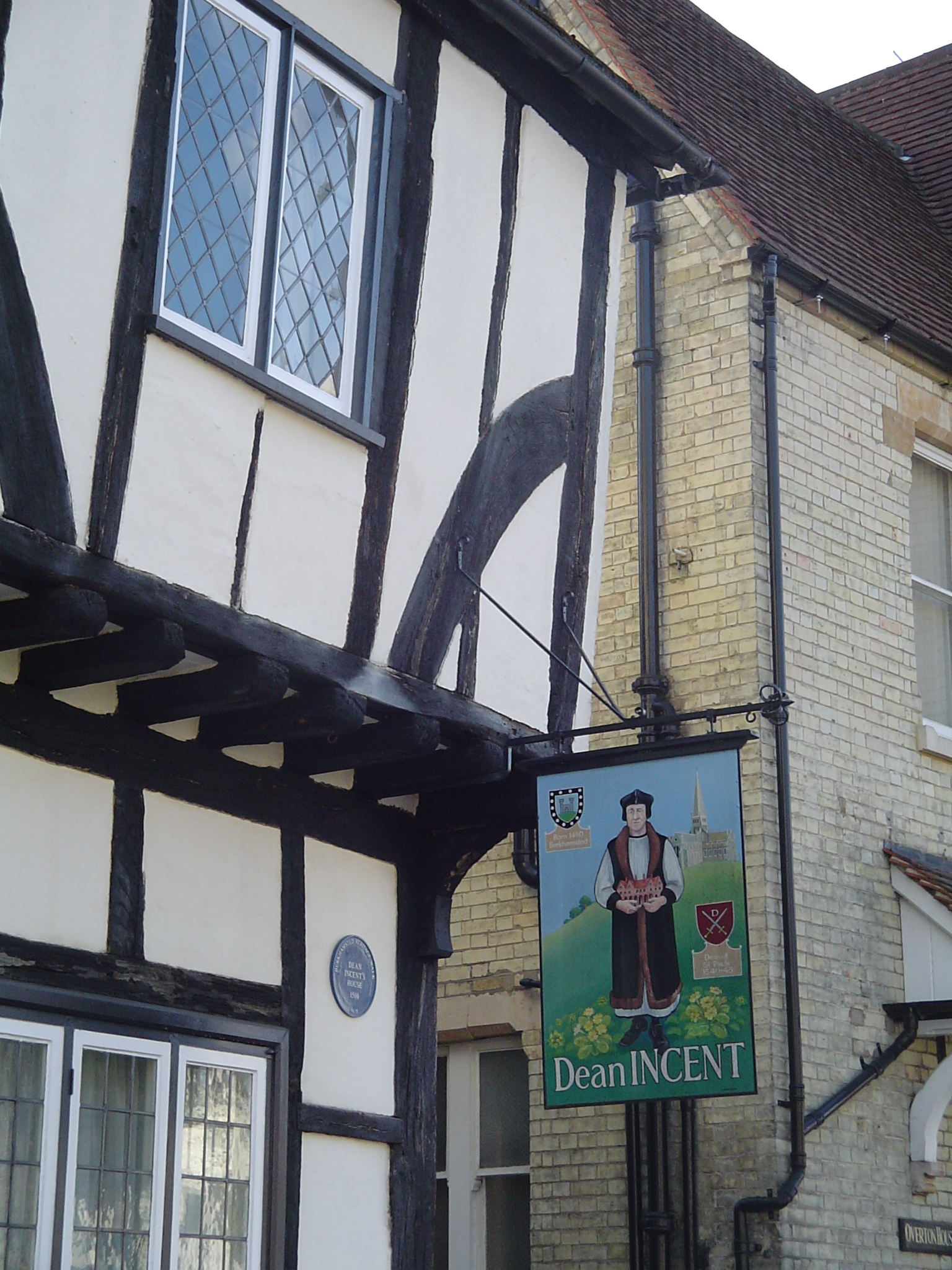
Dean Incent's House as it stands today on the Berkhamsted High Street

High clergy of the 16th century frequently distinguished themselves by their furthering of the educational establishment and, in this respect, Berkhamsted owes much to John Incent. In 1523, he called upon the brothers of the local brotherhood of St John the Baptist to divert the funds they had hitherto donated to the monastic hospital (which had closed) to the Brotherhood House, about which little is known. In 1541, however, Incent applied to the King, Henry VIII, in pursuit of a licence "to purchase £40 in land by the year," and was successful. It is considered an act of great piety that Incent chose to found a school outside what had become his sphere of influence.

By 1544, Berkhamsted School's first building, now known as 'Old Hall' was complete, later to be described by William Camden as "the only structure in Berkhamsted worth a second glance." The formal opening is recorded in the Ancient Documents:

When the building of the said Schoole was thus finished, the Deane sent for the chiefe men of the Towne into the Schoole, where he kneeling downe, gave thanks to Almighty God, which had given him life to see the perfection of that work, which both he, the towne and the country had beene about for the space of 20 years as is manifest by the pmisses. First he read his licence. Then he called for Richd Reeve, and placed him in the seate there made for the Schoolemr. and so did ordaine, make and pnounce him to be the first Master of the said Schoole and after that tooke him by the hand and did give him and his successors for ever possession of the lodgings appteining to that office. In like manner he placed John Audley to be Usher, and John East to be Chaplen. This done he did give possession by his deed bearing date the 23 of March in the 36 yeare of Henry the 8 to the said Richd Reeve John Audley and John East and their successours for ever, of all the land to the sd Schoole then appointed, which are expressed pticularly in an act of pliamt. made 2 & 3 Ed 6. Finally the Deane began TE DEUM LAUDAMUS which being finished with certaine other praiers and ceremonies, the whole Companie did there drink together and so depted.

Yet the legal foundation was not nearly so sound. When Incent died some 18 months later, his entire wealth (over £330) became the king's, his documents stating that Berkhamsted's founder, a highly educated lawyer, had died intestate. The authenticity of this claim is rightly questioned: shortly after Incent's death, a complaint was made to the king "by some evill persons that the Deane had laid to the Schoole more revenues than his licence [£40 annually] did permitt him." Furthermore, Henry VIII stood to gain £196 and "a front of pearls" from the Dean's estate. However, there had been no formal incorporation of the school, and records suggest that Incent had spent much time since the opening preparing, but not realising, legal protection. An investigation into the claims that his annual endowment had been exceeded was commissioned and undertaken by John Waterhouse, a favourite not only of the king, but also a confidant of Incent, who had been present at the opening. His choice of commissioner suggests the foundation still had royal approval, something that had allowed the school to survive the first attack against it. The most enduring legacy of the foundation nonetheless remains the building itself.

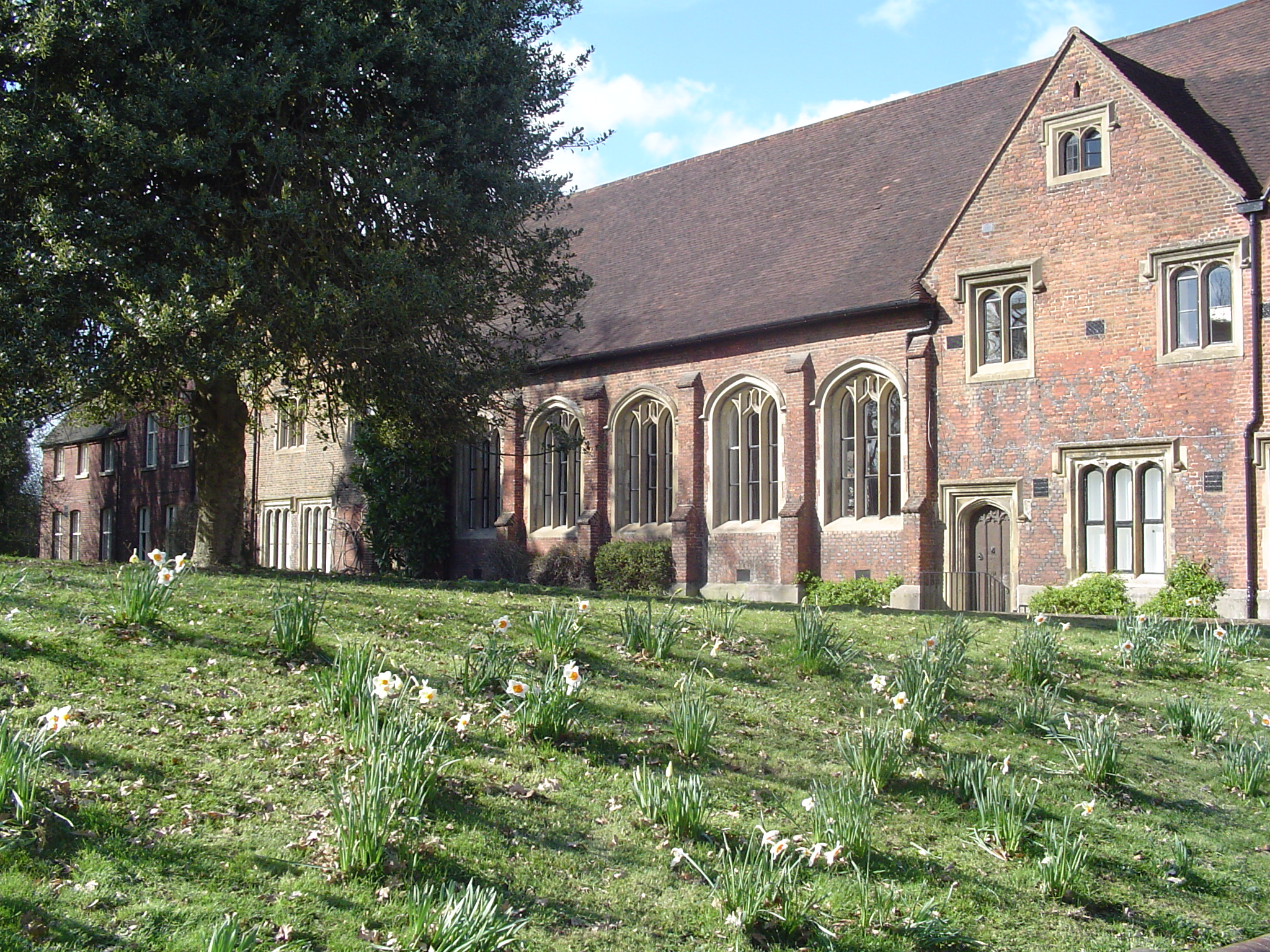
A view of Old Hall

=== A delicate establishment ===
Foundation of Berkhamsted School Act 1548
- Act of Parliament
- Parliament of England
- Long title: An Act for the Foundation of a School in Barckhamstede.
- Citation: 2 & 3 Edw. 6. c. 20 Pr.
- Territorial extent: England and Wales

Dates
- Royal assent: 14 March 1549

Status: Current legislation

Incent's death, which itself had created a threat to the school, was followed by that of Henry VIII in January 1547. The Dissolution of Colleges Act 1545 (37 Hen. 8. c. 4), which could have jeopardised the post of chaplain at Berkhamsted, was replaced by new legislation, the Dissolution of Colleges Act 1547 (1 Edw. 6. c. 14), and the foundation was declared "unperfect". The Foundation of Berkhamsted School Act 1548 (2 & 3 Edw. 6. c. 20 Pr.) was introduced in Parliament to settle the various claims to the Incent estate, but only those concerning the most immediate relatives of John. Thus claims to land of the school's endowment in Sparkford near Winchester were made and tried, resulting in significant loss to the school.

An additional threat came when Edward VI, acting on advice, re-established the school under his own name. In reality, there was both initial benefit and ultimate disadvantage in this. Richard Reeve, the first headmaster, held strict Protestant views, and was dismissed by the Bishop of Lincoln, acting upon Queen Mary I's instructions, in 1555. He was replaced by William Barker, who offered an alternative religious policy, for he himself was removed when Elizabeth I gained the throne.

=== 'So Mean a School' ===
It is some indication of the extent of Berkhamsted's degeneration under Fossan that his successor, Edmund Newboult, was recommended by the Bishop of Hereford as "of parts sufficient for so mean a school," an endorsement described as "comically unenthusiastic". The most prominent historical source on Newboult remains a reply he made to an educational researcher some years into his tenure, noting that "The Statues of the Schoole were made in the time of popery, therefore not observed." During his 17 years of office, Newboult does appear to have provided a solid educational environment at Berkhamsted, at least relatively speaking, something continued under his successor, Thomas Wren. In his wake came John Theed, member of a prosperous Buckinghamshire family, and Berkhamsted's longest serving headmaster. Indeed, throughout the 18th century, there were to be only four occupants of the post, an age not only of stability but stagnation. Nonetheless, the three inspections carried out during the three years found no cause for concern, and in their record is revealed the first reference to curriculum content, the boys having been examined on Ovid's Metamorphoses.

Theed was the school's second pluralist (it is no inspiration that the first was Fossan): his obituary in The Gentleman's Magazine recorded him as vicar of Marsworth and made no mention of his Berkhamsted role – some suggest this is characteristic of an insouciant, unambitious approach to the school. A similar charge could not be made against Evan Price. Having served as usher for 16 of Theed's less proactive years, Price had become accustomed to the day-to-day running of the school. On Theed's death in 1734, his succession, still the jurisdiction of the sovereign, brought Price to the headmastership, despite his not having attended university and his flamboyant record – as curate of Bovingdon, he had been involved in an "unseemly brawl" during a burial he was officiating.

== Notable alumni ==
- F. S. Aijazuddin, Pakistani Historian and FCA
- Henry Atkins (1554/5–1635), president of the College of Physicians, 1606–1635
- Richard Field (1561–1616), clergyman and theologian
- Sir Algernon Methuen (1856–1924), founder and owner, Methuen & Co, publishers, 1889–1924
- Clementine Churchill, Baroness Spencer-Churchill (1885–1977), wife of Winston Churchill
- Cecil Abercrombie (1886–1916), Scottish rugby union international and first-class cricketer
- Charles Seltman (1886–1957), author and archeologist
- Sir Lumley Lyster (1888–1957), admiral, Royal Navy
- Clifford Allen, 1st Baron Allen of Hurtwood (1889–1939), politician and peace campaigner
- Sir Donald Fergusson (1891–1963), Permanent Secretary, Ministry of Agriculture and Fisheries, 1936–1945, and Ministry of Fuel and Power, 1945–1952
- Clement Glenister (1897–1968), cricketer and Royal Navy officer
- H. W. Tilman (1898–1977), mountaineer and sailor
- A. K. Chesterton (1899–1973), first chairman of the National Front, 1967–1971
- C. H. S. Fifoot, (1899–1975), legal scholar
- F. S. Smythe (1900–1949), mountaineer and author
- Raymond Greene (1901–1982), endocrinologist and mountaineer
- Rex Tremlett (1903–1986) author and prospector
- Claud Cockburn (1904–1981), writer and journalist
- Graham Greene (1904–1991), author
- Bill Fiske, Baron Fiske (1905–1975), first leader of the Greater London Council, 1964–1967, and chairman of the Decimal Currency Board
- Sir Peter Quennell (1905–1993), writer and editor
- Sir Colin Buchanan (1907–2001), town planner
- Sir Hugh Greene (1910–1987), director-general of the BBC, 1960–1969
- Michael Sherard (1910–1998), born Malcolm Sherrard, fashion designer and academic
- Sir Kenneth Cork (1913–1991), accountant, and Lord Mayor of the City of London, 1978–1979
- Margot Jefferys (1916–1999), professor of medical sociology, Bedford College, London, 1968–1982
- Alan Pennington (1916-1961). Olympic athlete
- Antony Hopkins (1921–2014), composer
- Robert Simons (1922–2011), cricketer
- Stephen Dodgson (1924–2013), composer and broadcaster
- John Graham Nicholls (born 1929), physiologist
- Mark Boxer (Marc) (1931–1988), cartoonist and magazine editor
- Michael Podro (1931–2008), art historian
- Alexander Goehr (1932-2024), composer and 1987 Reith Lecturer
- Sir Anthony Cleaver (born 1938), chairman of the Medical Research Council, 1998–2006
- Sir Robin Knox-Johnston (born 1939), yachtsman
- John Bly (born 1939), antiques expert
- Michael Meacher (1939–2015), politician
- Richard Mabey (born 1941), nature writer
- Kit Wright (born 1944), children's poet
- Sir Christopher Hum (born 1946), ambassador to China and Master of Gonville and Caius College, Cambridge
- Keith Mans (born 1946), politician
- Zaha Hadid (1950–2016), multiple-award-winning architect
- Alan Goldberg (born 1954), warden of western marble arch synagogue
- Lieutenant General Mark Mans (born 1955), Adjutant-General to the Forces
- Guy Pooley (born 1965), rower
- Emma Fielding (born 1966), actress
- Roger Moorhouse (born 1968), historian and author
- Stephen Campbell Moore (born 1977 Stephen Thorpe), actor
- Robert Courts (born 1978), politician and Member of Parliament for Witney
- Suzie Imber (born 1983), planetary scientist
- Carla Chases (born 1984), actress
- James Rodwell (born 1984), rugby, team GB rugby 7s at the Rio Olympic Games, 2016 - silver medalist
- Talulah Riley (born 1985), actress
- Will Fraser (born 1989), rugby union player
- Simon Minter (born 1992), YouTuber, better known as Miniminter
- Roman Kemp (born 1993), radio and television presenter
- Olajide "JJ" Olatunji (born 1993), YouTuber, rapper and boxer better known as KSI
- Jonathan Bond (born 1993), football goalkeeper

=== Victoria Cross holders ===
Three former students have won the Victoria Cross: Arthur Mayo during the Indian Mutiny; and George Pearkes and Brett Mackay Cloutman, both during the First World War.

== School offices ==
=== Headmasters of Berkhamsted School, 1544–1996 ===
Between the school's opening in 1544 and the formation of the collegiate school in 1997, there were 30 headmasters, whose average length of service was 15 years.

- Richard Reeve (1544–1555)
- William Barker (1555–1567)
- William Saltmarsh (1567–1600)
- Thomas Hunt (1600–1636)
- Henry Hunt (1636)
- William Pitkin (1636–1643)
- Timothy Taylor (1643–1648)
- Archibald Ogle (1648–1651)
- Thomas Hawes (1651–1661)
- Peter Berkenhead (1661–1662)
- Thomas Fossan (1662–1668)
- Edmund Newboult (1668–1685)
- Thomas Wren (1685–1691)
- John Theed (1691–1734)
- Evan Price (1734–1748)
- Thomas Bland (1753–1788)
- John Dupré (1788–1805)
- Thomas Dupré (1805–1842)
- Edward John Wilcocks (1842–1850)
- John Robert Crawford (1850–1864)
- Edward Bartrum (1864–1889)
- Thomas Charles Fry (1889–1911)
- Charles Henry Greene (1911–1927), father of Graham Greene
- Henry Lael Oswald Flecker (1927–1931)
- Cuthbert Machell Cox (1931–1946)
- Claude Ronald Evers (1946–1953)
- Basil Hugh Garnons Williams (1953–1972)
- John Loraine Spencer (1972–1983)
- Charles Jonathan "Jonty" Driver (1983–1989)
- Keith Howard Wilkinson (1989–1996)

=== Principals of Berkhamsted Collegiate School ===
1. Priscilla Chadwick (1997–2008)

=== Principals of Berkhamsted School ===
1. Mark Steed (2008–2015)
2. Richard Backhouse (2016–2026)
3. Martin Walker (2026–present)
