= Wally Jones =

Wally Jones may refer to:

- Wallace Jones (1926–2014), Olympic basketball player
- Wally Jones, character in 1,000 Dollars a Minute

== See also ==
- Wali Jones (born 1942), American basketball player
- Walter Jones (disambiguation)
