= Michael Podro =

British art historian (1931–2008)

Michael Podro CBE FBA (13 March 1931 – 28 March 2008) was a British art historian. Podro, the son of Jewish refugees from central Europe, was born in and grew up in Hendon, Middlesex. He attended Berkhamsted School in Hertfordshire, served in the RAF, and read English at Jesus College, Cambridge, and philosophy at University College London. After finishing his PhD in philosophy and art history, he taught at Camberwell College of Arts, the Warburg Institute and Essex University, where he became a professor. His best-known works are from his period here: The Manifold in Perception: Theories of Art from Kant to Hildebrand (1972), and Critical Historians of Art (1982). Here Podro argued for bringing philosophical questions to bear on the study of art, as well as the prevailing focus on style, attribution and contextual detail.

Podro served as a trustee at the Victoria and Albert Museum and was a fellow of the British Academy. In 1961 he married Charlotte Booth, with whom he had two daughters.

== External source ==
- David Carrier (April 2008). "Michael Podro (1931-2008)". artcritical.com.
- Charles Saumarez Smith (April 2008). "Michael Podro (1931-2008)". The Independent. Archived from the original on 5 April 2008.
