= Anthea Gamble Carew =

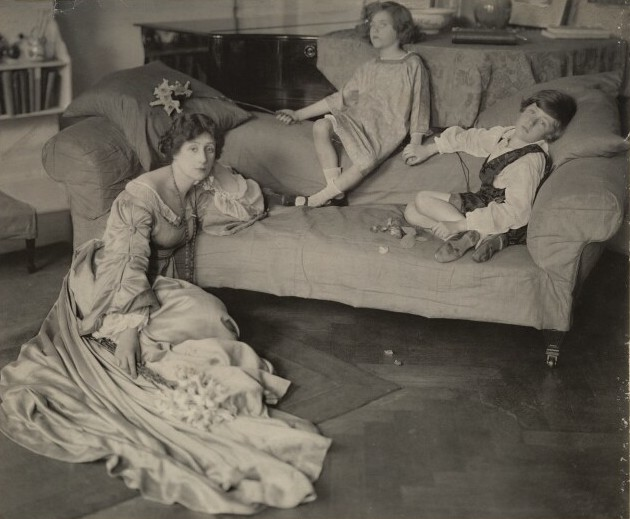
Helen Maud Gamble (née Isherwood); Anthea Rosemary Carew (née Gamble); Patrick Henry Noel Gamble by Cavendish Morton, 1913

Anthea Rosemary Gamble Carew (1906–1960) was a British socialite, who was, together with her brother Patrick, part of the Bright Young Things of the 1920s.

== Biography ==
Anthea Rosemary Gamble was born in 1906, the daughter of Henry Gamble, Anglican priest and author, Dean of Exeter in the Church of England from 1918 to 1931, and Helen Maud Isherwood. Her brother was Patrick Henry Noel Gamble.

In 1928, Gamble married the Times sports journalist Dudley Carew. The marriage lasted only few months. In the early 1930s Anthea Gamble was one of Brenda Dean Paul's closest friends. Like Paul, Carew was also a morphine addict. She was prosecuted twice in 1932, both cases involving Paul.

In the late 1930s, Carew moved to Yorkshire.
