= Henry Barker (canon) =

Henry Barker (1657–1740) was Canon of Westminster from 1714 until 1740.

== Background ==
Henry Barker, born in 1657, was the son of the Rev Joseph Barker of Sherborne in Dorset. He was educated at Sherborne and Trinity College, Oxford, awarded a BA in 1676 and becoming a Doctor of Divinity in 1713 .

== Ecclesiastical career ==
Barker was Rector of Rotherfield Greys, Oxfordshire, before being made a prebendary Canon of Westminster in 1716. He remained a prebendary of Westminster until his death in 1740. He is buried in the south transept of Westminster Abbey where his memorial is inscribed, 'Dr Harry Barker, prebendary of this Collegiate Church, died on he 5th day of September in the year of Our Lord 1740 aged 87'.

Barker lived in one of the houses abutting on the north side of the nave of Westminster Abbey. These houses were demolished soon after his death. He never married and left his estate to his servant, widow Lake Chapman, and her family.
