= F. S. Aijazuddin =

Pakistani historian, academic and business executive

F. S. Aijazuddin OBE

Interim Minister for Culture, Tourism and Environment, Punjab
- In office November 2007 – April 2008

Personal details
- Born: 1942 (age 83–84)
- Education: Aitchison College
- Alma mater: Berkhamsted School, CA (1965)
- Website: fsaijazuddin.pk

Fakir Syed Aijazuddin OBE is a Pakistani historian, academic and business executive. From November 2007 to April 2008, he served as Punjab's interim Minister for Culture, Tourism and Environment.

== Early life ==
Aijazuddin was born in 1942. He received his education from the Aitchison College in Lahore and Berkhamsted School in England, and qualified as a chartered accountant in 1965.

== Career ==
During the 1970s, Aijazuddin worked in various public sector projects across Pakistan, including as a director at the National Fertilizer Corporation. From 1980 to 1989, he worked at the Abu Dhabi National Oil Company in an executive role. In 1989, he returned to Pakistan and served as CEO of International General Insurance and the First International Investment Bank. Aijazuddin was also a board member of the Lahore Stock Exchange, Oil & Gas Development Company, PTCL, National Transmission & Despatch Company and Bata Pakistan.

Aijazuddin has taught accounting and management at the Lahore University of Management Sciences and Forman Christian College University. From 2006 to 2008, he was a faculty member at the National School of Public Policy where he taught international relations. From 2008 and 2012, he served as the principal of Aitchison College.

Additionally, he has also been the chairman of the Lahore Museum and a fellow of the National College of Arts.

=== Political career ===
Between November 2007 and April 2008, Aijazuddin was a member of the interim Punjab cabinet. He served as Punjab's Minister for Culture, Tourism and Environment.

Since 1994, he has been the UK government's honorary consul in Lahore, for which he received an Order of the British Empire in 1997. He retired from the post in June 2022.

== Family ==
He is married to Shahnaz (herself a writer of note). They have three children - Momina, Mubarika, and Komail - and also two grandchildren Raeya and Ramiz.

== Bibliography ==
Pahari Paintings & Sikh Portraits in the Lahore Museum (1977).

Sikh Portraits by European Artists (1979).

Aitchison College - The First Hundred Years 1886 - 1986 (1986).

Lahore - Illustrated Views of the Nineteenth Century (1993).

Historical Images of Pakistan (1994).

The Armless Queen and Other Essays (1994).

Rare Maps of Pakistan (2000).

From a Head, Through a Head, To a Head: The Secret Channel between the US and China through Pakistan (2000).

The Bark of a Pen. A Miscellany of Articles and Speeches (2001).

The White House & Pakistan: Secret Declassified Documents, 1969-74 (2002).

Lahore Recollected: An Album (2003).

When Bush Comes to Shove & Other Writings (2006).

The Counterfoils of My Years: 1942-1971 (2007).

Commanding Success: Aitchison College, 1886-2011 (2011).

From a Minister’s Journal (2013).

The Resourceful Fakirs: Three Muslim brothers at the Sikh Court of Lahore (2014).

The Morning After: Writings and Speeches, 2006-2014 (Lahore, 2015).

The Fickle Years: Memoirs 1972-79 (2016).

Sketches from a Howdah: Charlotte, Lady Canning’s Tours, 1858-61 (2019).

Shooting Words: Writings, 2014-18 (2020).

Imperial Curiosity: Early Views of Pakistan, 1845-1906 (2021).

Studies in Majesty: Paintings by August Schoefft and related portraits (2021).

Forgotten Images : Postcards of Pre-Pakistan, 1890 - 1947.
