= Paul Baumann (accountant) =

British accountant

Paul David Baumann CBE LVO is an accountant, and since November 2018 he is the Receiver General of Westminster Abbey. In that role, he took part in the 2023 Coronation. He was NHS England's Chief Financial Officer 2012–2018.

== Life ==
He grew up in Dorset. His degree was in Modern and Medieval Languages at St Catharine's College, Cambridge. He is married and has three children. They live in Surrey and he spends most of his time outside work accompanying them in their various musical pursuits.

He worked for 22 years at Unilever which he joined in 1984 as a management trainee in Unilever's animal feed business. Later he had a place on the Unilever Board in Ireland and Germany and was involved with finance excellence and innovation across the global company. He left in 2007.

He joined NHS London, the strategic health authority, in May 2007. He was NHS London's first Director of Finance and Performance. He was co-author with NHS London strategy director Hannah Farrar of a report in 2014–15, using McKinsey modelling data, which concluded that just six of London's 18 non-foundation hospital trusts will be financially viable for the long term in their current form.

Baumann's salary of nearly £210,000 was the fifth highest in the NHS in 2013. He was reckoned by the Health Service Journal to be the tenth most influential person in the English NHS in 2015. As of 2015, Baumann was paid a salary of between £205,000 and £209,999 by NHS England, making him one of the 328 most highly paid people in the British public sector at that time.

In November 2018 Baumann was appointed the Receiver General and Chapter Clerk of Westminster Abbey, the most senior lay role at the Abbey. He was installed as the Receiver General and Chapter Clerk during the First Evensong of the Baptism of Christ on Saturday 12 January 2019.
