= Dudley Carew =

English journalist, writer, poet and film critic (1903–1981)

Dudley Charles Carew (3 July 1903 – 22 March 1981) was an English journalist, writer, poet and film critic.

== Life and career ==
Carew was educated at Lancing College, where he was the best friend of Evelyn Waugh. Later in life, Waugh spurned Carew, but in spite of this Carew continued to be Waugh's loyal supporter, including denying the allegations of youthful homosexuality that had been made against him.

In 1928 he married Anthea Gamble. The marriage was not a success, and they divorced just five years later.

He was a special correspondent of The Times in the 1920s and 1930s, and reported on cricket matches for the paper. From 1945 until his retirement in 1963 he was the paper's film critic, and also wrote book reviews and amusing fourth leaders. Almost all his articles for The Times were written anonymously, as was the paper's policy until William Rees-Mogg became its editor in 1967.

John Arlott wrote of him:

It was, perhaps, unfortunate for Dudley Carew that his entry into cricket writing should have coincided with the rise of Neville Cardus. If there had never been a Cardus, how highly should we have ranked one who wrote: "At the other end Gunn batted much as a man potters about a garden, digging his fork into a bed with an abstracted and absent-minded air..."

Arlott also rated highly Carew's cricket novel, Son of Grief, saying: "It has its darknesses, but it is convincing, and its characters are rounded and credible." The title, as with another of Carew's cricket books, was taken from the poetry of A. E. Housman. Housman's A Shropshire Lad contains the lines:

Now in Maytime to the wicket
Out I march with bat and pad:
See the son of grief at cricket
Trying to be glad.

Carew died in March 1981 at Cuckfield, Sussex, aged 77.

== Bibliography ==
- "The Wanderer" (poem), Second Selection from Modern Poets, London: Martin Secker, 1924, edited by J. C. Squire.
- The Next Corner, London: John Lane The Bodley Head, 1924. Novel.
- Tuesday, Wednesday, Thursday, London: John Lane The Bodley Head, 1926; New York: Frank-Maurice, 1927. Novel.
- England Over: A Cricket Book, Martin Secker, 1927.
- The Courteous Revelation, John Lane, 1927.
- Son of Grief, Arthur Barker, 1936.
- To The Wicket, Chapman & Hall Ltd, 1947.
- The Taken Town, Charles Scribner's Sons, New York, 1947.
- The Puppet's Part, Home & Van Thal, 1948.
- The House is Gone: A Personal Retrospect, Robert Hale, 1949.
- A Fragment of Friendship: A Memory of Evelyn Waugh When Young, Everest Books, 1974, ISBN 0-903925-10-9.
