= David Stanton (priest) =

English priest

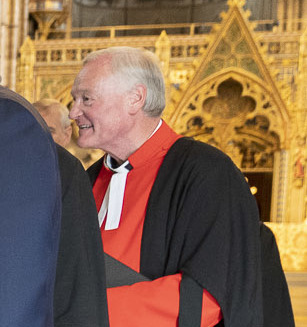
The Venerable David Stanton in 2019

David John Stanton (born 10 October 1960) is an English priest, the present Sub-Dean of Westminster Abbey. In that role, he took part in the 2023 Coronation.

== Career ==
Stanton studied at the University of St Andrews, prepared for ordination at Ripon College Cuddesdon, was ordained deacon in 1985 and priest in 1986, and undertook postgraduate studies at the University of Plymouth and the University of Exeter.

He held the following church positions:

- Curate at St George's Church, Beckenham (1985–88)
- Assistant Chaplain at Shrewsbury School (1988–90)
- Priest-in-Charge at St Mary's, Abbotskerswell (1990–94)
- Chaplain of the University of Plymouth (1992–97)
- Priest-in-Charge at St John's, Bovey Tracey (1994–2005)
- Rural Dean of Moreton (1998–2005)
- Canon Precentor and Pastor at Worcester Cathedral (2005–13)

He was appointed a Canon Residentiary of Westminster Abbey in 2013, as Canon Treasurer and Almoner.

He is a governor of Westminster School and of the University of Westminster, Vice Chair of Oxford University Research Ethics Committee (Humanities & Social Sciences Divisions), and a Distinguished Friend of Oxford University.
