= Walter Jennings Jones =

American biochemist (1865–1935)

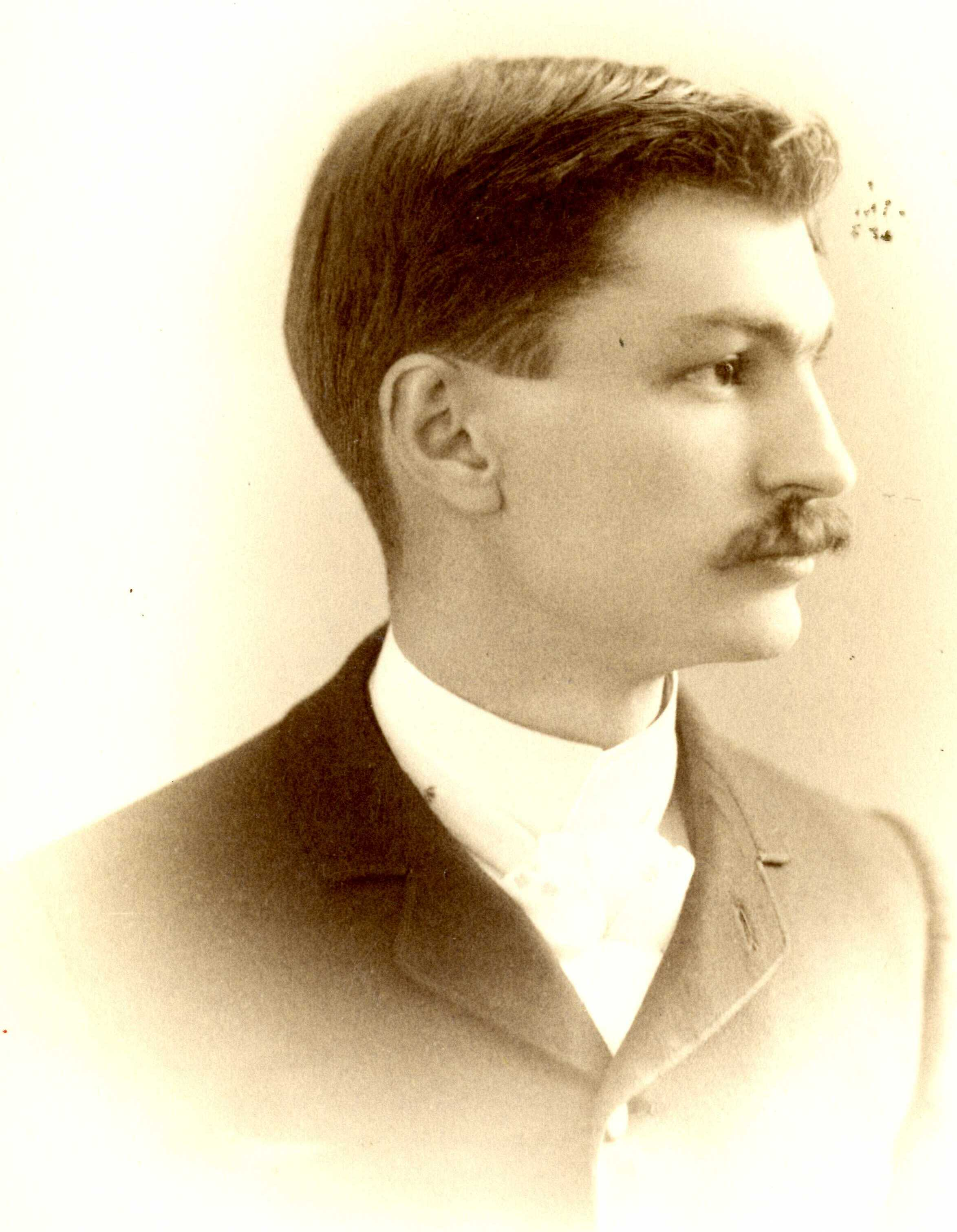
- Carte-de-visite, 1892
- Born: April 28, 1865; Baltimore, Maryland, U.S.
- Died: February 28, 1935 (aged 69); Baltimore, Maryland, U.S.
- Resting place: Mount Olivet Cemetery; Baltimore, Maryland, U.S.
- Education: City College, Baltimore
- Alma mater: Johns Hopkins University (BA, PhD)
- Spouse: Grace Crary Clarke (m. 1891)
- Children: 1
- Scientific career
- Doctoral advisor: Ira Remsen

Signature
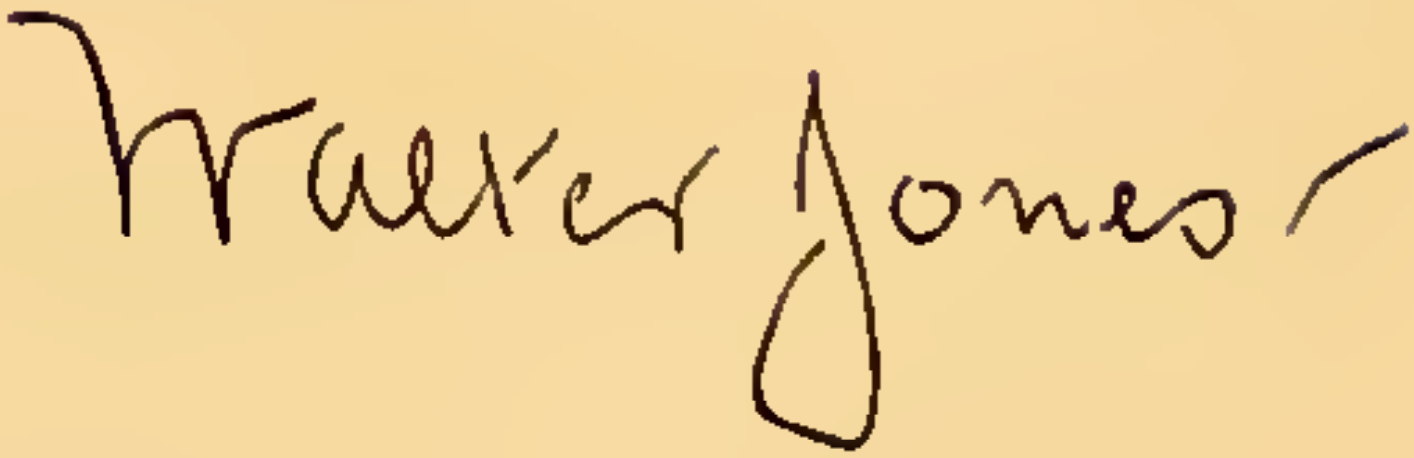

Walter Jennings Jones (April 28, 1865 – February 28, 1935) was an American biochemist and a professor at Johns Hopkins University who was among the early investigators of the composition of the nucleic acids including the presence of nucleotides, sugar and phosphate. He also noted the presence of thermostable enzymes that could break the nucleic acids by breaking the inter-nucleotide bonds. He published his results in the 1920 book Nucleic Acids: Their Chemical Properties and Physiological Conduct.

== Early life ==
Jones was born in Baltimore to Zeanette Jane (née Bohen) and Levin Jones, both devout Methodists. His father was a ship chandler of his business at the Light Street Wharf in Baltimore. His father died when he was thirteen. Jones's middle name was after a physician friend of the family and he rarely used it. He was educated at local schools, and joined the City College, Baltimore in 1879 and graduated in the spring of 1884. He joined Johns Hopkins University in 1884 and received his Bachelor of Arts in 1888 with studies in chemistry, and minors in mineralogy and geology. He received a PhD in 1891, studying under Ira Remsen.

== Career ==
Jones worked as an acting professor of natural science at Wittenberg College, Springfield, Ohio. In September 1892, Jones started work at Purdue University but moved back to Baltimore. In March 1896 he became an assistant in physiological chemistry under John J. Abel at Johns Hopkins. He served in that role until 1899 when he became an associate in physiological chemistry and toxicology. In 1902, he became an assistant professor of physiological chemistry and toxicology. He served in that role until 1908. In 1908, Jones became a full professor of physiological chemistry when the Department of Physiological Chemistry was established. He served in that role until 1923. From 1923 to 1927, Jones served as DeLamar Professor of Physiological Chemistry, a role named after school benefactor De Lamar.

In 1899 he visited Germany and was inspired by the work of Albrecht Kossel which led to a focus on the study of nucleic acids. Among the works that Jones did was to come to the conclusion that some nucleic acids had a five carbon sugar (in yeast) and that animals they had a six carbon sugar. This was a period when the contemporary model of tetranucleotides was proposed by Jones' rival P.A. Levene. Another discovery was thermostable enzymes capable of breaking the inter-nucleotide bonds, now known to be ribonuclease A.

== Personal life ==
Jones married Grace Crary Clarke, daughter of Reverend George Clarke of Ocean Grove, New Jersey, on September 1, 1891. They had one daughter, Marion Eleanor.

Jones lived at Hopkins Apartments. He died on February 28, 1935, at Union Memorial Hospital in Baltimore. He was buried at Mount Olivet Cemetery in Baltimore.
