= John Jennings (priest) =

English Archdeacon of Westminster (1798–1883)

John Jennings (1798 – 26 March 1883) was Archdeacon of Westminster from 1868 until his death in 1883.

Alumni Cantabrigienses previously identified the John Jennings educated at Emmanuel College, Cambridge as "doubtless" the Rector of St John's and Archdeacon of Westminster, but now states that this is a mistaken identity: Archdeacon Jennings was educated at Trinity College Dublin, graduating B.A. 1820, M.A. 1832.

After a curacy at West Meon, Hampshire, Jennings moved to St John's, Smith Square as a curate to Canon H. H. Edwards, succeeding Edwards as rector on Edwards's resignation in 1832. He became a canon of Westminster Abbey in 1837, Rural dean of St Margaret and St John, Archdeacon of Westminster in 1868, and Sub-Dean.

Church of England titles
Preceded by Christopher Wordsworth	Archdeacon of Westminster; 1868–1883	Succeeded by Frederick Farrar
