= Thomas Wood (priest) =

Chaplain to Mary I of England

Thomas Wood (c. 1499 – c. 1588) was a Roman Catholic chaplain to Mary I of England and later a confessor of the Catholic faith. Wood was the last of the Cambridge Franciscans who occupied the site where Sidney Sussex College was eventually built from 1596. Wood was held in the Tower of London after Mary's death, and threatened with torture. He was later transferred to Marshalsea Prison. He died in Wisbech Castle around 1588.
