= Henry Gamble =

20th-century Anglican priest and author

The Very Reverend Henry Gamble

Dean of Exeter
- In office 1918–1931

Personal details
- Born: 6 November 1859 Barnstaple, Devon
- Died: 9 August 1931 (aged 71) Exeter
- Spouse: Helen Maud née Isherwood
- Education: Oriel College, Oxford

Henry Reginald Gamble (6 November 1859 – 9 August 1931) was an Anglican priest and author. He was the Dean of Exeter in the Church of England from 1918 to 1931.

Gamble was educated at Oriel College, Oxford and ordained in 1885. He held curacies at All Saints, Molton, Devon St Mark's, Hamilton Terrace and St Andrew's, Wells Street. From 1895 to 1902 he was Vicar of St Botolph's Aldersgate and then Rector of Holy Trinity, Sloane Street, with St Jude's, Sloane Court. An Honorary Chaplain to the King and Select Preacher at Lincoln's Inn, he was a Canon of Westminster and Rector of St John the Evangelist until his appointment to the Deanery. He died in post.

In 1906 he was elected to Chelsea Borough Council as a Municipal Reform Party councillor representing Royal Hospital Ward. He served as Mayor of Chelsea in 1908–09, and was re-elected to the council for a second three-year term in 1909.

He married Helen Maud Isherwood, and had two children: Patrick Henry Noel Gamble and Anthea Rosemary Gamble Carew.

(All the above places and streets except for Molton and Exeter are in London.)

Church of England titles
Preceded by Alfred Earle	Dean of Exeter; 1918– 931	Succeeded by Walter Matthews
