= Gabriel Grant =

American surgeon and military officer (1826–1909)

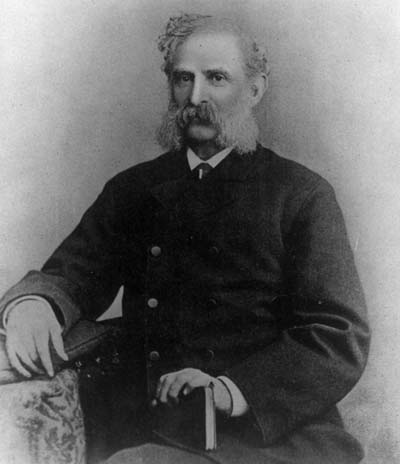
- Born: September 4, 1826; Newark, New Jersey, US
- Died: November 8, 1909 (aged 83); Manhattan, New York, US
- Burial place: Sleepy Hollow, New York, US
- Education: Williams College (MA); Columbia University
- Spouse: Caroline Manice
- Children: 4
- Military career
- Allegiance: United States
- Branch: Union Army
- Service years: 1861–65
- Rank: Major
- Units: 3rd Brigade, 1st Division, II Corps
- Conflicts: American Civil War; Battle of Fair Oaks
- Awards: Medal of Honor

Dr. Gabriel Grant (September 4, 1826 – November 8, 1909) was an American surgeon and Union Army major who was awarded the Medal of Honor for his actions during the Civil War.

== Early life ==
Gabriel Grant was born in Newark, New Jersey, in 1826. His father was Charles Grant, an officer in the War of 1812, and he was a descendant of Robert Treat, one of the Puritan founders of Newark.

He attended Williams College, graduating in 1846 with a master's degree. He later graduated from the College of Physicians and Surgeons in 1851.

== Career ==
In 1852, he worked as a surgeon in Panama during the height of the California Gold Rush at a time when hordes of prospectors traveled across the isthmus on their way to the gold fields by sea and organized the American Hospital the following year. While there, he also edited the Panama Herald. He then returned to practice medicine in his hometown of Newark. In 1854, he was part of a special commission set up to fight the cholera epidemic in the city.

=== Civil War ===
With the onset of the Civil War, he joined the 2nd Infantry Regiment of New Jersey Volunteers as a surgeon from June to October 1861. He was then appointed to the U.S. Volunteers before joining the brigade under the command of William French. He won distinction during the Battle of Fair Oaks on June 1, 1862 after he rescued several soldiers while under heavy fire, and was awarded the Medal of Honor on July 21, 1897. His citation reads:

Removed severely wounded officers and soldiers from the field while under a heavy fire from the enemy, exposing himself beyond the call of duty, thus furnishing an example of most distinguished gallantry.

In February 1863, he was appointed Medical Director of Hospitals in Evanston, Indiana, and was placed in charge of the United States Army Hospital in Madison, Indiana, on September 4 of the same year. He resigned his commission in January 1865 due to a wound he had received while operating in the field.

After the war, he was elected as a companion of the New York Commandery of the Military Order of the Loyal Legion of the United States.

== Personal life ==
Grant married Caroline Manice in 1864. After the war, they lived in Newark, but soon moved to New York City, where all four of their children (three sons, one daughter) were born. The eldest was the lawyer, eugenicist, and conservationist Madison Grant.

Gabriel Grant died at his home at 22 East 49th Street, Manhattan, New York, at the age of 83. He was survived by his wife and three sons.

== See also ==
- List of American Civil War Medal of Honor recipients: G–L
