= Richard Ryve =

Canon of Windsor

Richard Ryve (also Reve) (d. 1594) was a Canon of Windsor from 1560 to 1594.

== Career ==
He was educated at All Souls College, Oxford where he graduated BA in 1534, MA in 1537.

He was appointed:

- Rector of Berkhamsted 1552
- School master of Berkhamsted Grammar School 1552
- Rector of Marsh Gibbon 1561
- Prebendary of Westminster 1560
- Chaplain to Queen Elizabeth I

He was appointed to the eleventh stall in St George's Chapel, Windsor Castle in 1560 and held the canonry until 1594.
