= Walter Jones (priest) =

Walter Jones was a Welsh Anglican priest in the mid 16th Century.

Jones was educated at the University of Oxford. He held livings at Hodgeston and Aberporth. He was Archdeacon of Brecon from 1561 until 1567. He was then Rector of Long Marston until his death in 1577.
