= Carol Graham (missionary) =

English missionary in India

- Deaconess
- Church: Church of South India
- Installed: 1933

Personal details
- Born: 1898 Harrow, London, England
- Died: 15 April 1989 (aged 90–91) Woking, Surrey, England
- Denomination: Anglicanism

Carol Graham (1898 – 15 April 1989) was an English Anglican missionary, deaconess of the Church of South India, ecumenist and spiritual writer.

== Life ==
Graham was born in Harrow, London in 1898, one of five children of a housemaster at Harrow School. After working in child care and a hospital during World War I, for the Society for the Propagation of the Gospel and the College of the Ascension in Birmingham, she visited India with her father in 1926. She came into contact with Samuel Azariah, Bishop of Dornakal. Graham was captivated by his vision of a native Anglican Church and, after some appropriate training, returned to India to help galvanise potential leaders among women in the Church, working in the Dornakal diocese. In 1933, she was ordained a deaconess. After World War II, Sister Carol was appointed secretary of a new organisation training women for leadership across the region, which in 1947 would become part of the Church of South India, uniting the Anglican, Methodist, and Presbyterian traditions. From this effort was developed the Order of Women, which supported Church of India women workers called to a celibate life, based at Vishranthi Nilayam, the "House of Refreshment", in a former orphanage in Bangalore. During this time, Sister Carol wrote a variety of devotional books, especially encouraging the spiritual life of families in the home. From 1960 to 1963, she worked in North India on the organisation of women's work there.

In 1963, Sister Carol retired and returned to the United Kingdom. She had already been discussing the idea of creating a community of women dedicated to working and praying for the unity of the Churches, and Eric Abbott, Dean of Westminster Abbey, offered to act as a sponsor of such a community. Eventually, the former house of the Anglican spiritual director Fr Reginald Somerset Ward, 5 Wolseley Road in Farncombe, was secured for the venture, which became known as the Farncombe Community. Sister Carol became Head Sister, promoting the work of the Community as well as leading it day-to-day. She travelled widely around the UK, leading ecumenical retreats and quiet days.

In accordance with the rules of the Community, Sister Carol retired on the last day of her seventy-fifth year and went to live with her sister Elizabeth in Farnham. From there, she moved to Smiles Home for the Elderly in Woking in 1985 and finally Bernard Sunley House, where she died in 1989.

== Works ==
- "Azariah of Dornakal" (1945)
- "The Church of South India: A Short Handbook" (1951)
- "The Meaning and Practice of Prayer" (1959)
- "The Holy Spirit in the Home" (1962)
- "Praying Places Along the Way" (1962)
- "Record of the Farncombe Community" (1973)
