= Farncombe Community =

Ecumenical female community in England

The Farncombe Community was an ecumenical community of women founded in 1964 by Sister Carol Graham to work and pray for the unity of Christian denominations, and based in Farncombe in Surrey. The Community came to an end in 1989.

The concept of the Farncombe Community arose out of visits Sister Carol Graham, a former Anglican missionary and ordained deaconess of the Church of South India, made to the inter-denominational community of Grandchamp in Switzerland, which led her to reflect on the ecumenical lessons the CSI could teach the rest of the Church. A base was found for the Community at 5 Wolseley Road in Farncombe, the home of Anglican spiritual director Fr Reginald Somerset Ward and, after his death in 1962, the house’s owner, Deaconess Edith Banks, passed the property to the British Council of Churches for the purpose of housing the new venture. The house was dedicated in 1964 and the Community inaugurated under its Rule in January 1965. Revd Eric Abbott, Dean of Westminster Abbey, George Reindorp Bishop of Guildford, and Brother Paul of Taizé all took part in the ceremony.

The Sisters lived a quasi-monastic life based around silent prayer, the recitation of a morning and night Office and a weekly Eucharist in the house chapel celebrated by a variety of clergy according to different rites, and tasks around the house. Apart from this, the work of the Community centred on welcoming guests who came on retreat or for quiet days, working with the local Christian Churches on ecumenical matters, and outreach; this included the Companions who came to number more than a hundred, and the Fellowship of Prayer for Unity, which was technically the charitable title of the Community but in practice was a wide group of well-wishers from all Church traditions. The Sisters also organised events to popularise the idea of ecumenism in general. At the age of 75 Sisters were to retire and leave the Community. However it was always hard to recruit new members and the Community never numbered more than six Sisters. Most of the Sisters were from an Anglican, Methodist or CSI background; one, Dorothy Bee, was a Roman Catholic.

In a sense the culmination of the Community’s work came in 1987 with the Swanwick Conference of the British Council of Churches at which the organisation was renamed Churches Together in Britain and Ireland with the intention of involving laypeople in ecumenical efforts rather than just Church ministers and officials. Sister Mary Holliday, one of the first women to be ordained as a Methodist minister, had been Chaplain to the conference and organised its worship.

By the late 1980s, there were only three remaining Sisters, all from a Nonconformist background. The Community finally came to an end in July 1989, a few months after the death of Sister Carol, and the remaining Sisters dispersed. For a while the work was continued by the Ecumenical Spirituality Project led by Gwen Cashmore and Joan Puls, who left 5 Wolseley Road in 1994, then subsequently in a dispersed form by the Fellowship of Prayer, which carried on until 2000, and lastly the Living Spirituality Network, based at Willen in Milton Keynes, which came to an end in 2012.

== List of Sisters ==
- Carol Graham, 1964-75 (1st Head Sister)
- Eleanor Mason, 1964-67
- Ethel Tomkinson, 1964-66
- Claire Thomson, 1964-69
- Doris Thompson, 1965-71
- Elizabeth Swingler, 1970-81 (2nd Head Sister)
- Revd Mary Holliday, 1970-89 (3rd Head Sister)
- Florence Carpenter, 1970-83
- Dorothy Bee, 1971-77
- Maria Lee, 1975-76
- Olive Tallack, 1977-89
- Rhoda Garrard, 1980–89
