= Reginald Somerset Ward =

English Anglican priest and author

Personal details
- Born: 28 January 1881 Newcastle-under-Lyme, Staffordshire, England
- Died: 9 July 1962 (aged 81)
- Denomination: Anglicanism

Reginald Somerset Ward (28 January 1881 – 9 July 1962) was an English Anglican priest, author and spiritual director.

== Biography ==
Ward was born in Newcastle-under-Lyme, one of four children of Richard Ward, Vicar of St George's Church in the town, and Edith Drake. He was educated at Newcastle High School, Marlborough College, Cheltenham College, and Pembroke College, Cambridge, where he studied history and graduated BA with second-class honours in 1903. He met his future wife, Charlotte Kissam, of New Jersey, while on holiday in Switzerland in 1902 and had proposed to her within ten days. Ward was ordained deacon in 1904 and priest in 1905, and served his title at Emmanuel Church, Camberwell. In 1906, he finally married Charlotte and proceeded to a second curacy at St Clement's, Barnsbury. Between 1909 and 1913, he was Secretary of the Church of England Sunday School Institute and then became Rector of Chiddingfold, a small rural Surrey parish. Ward aroused unpopularity in the village for his pacifism, for trying to stop the bellringers bringing beer into the belfry, and for rebuking wealthy parishioners for hoarding food. Early in 1915 he received a strong 'interior call' to give himself up to the work of spiritual direction and eventually received permission from Edward Talbot, the Bishop of Winchester, to do so. He was supported by a group of anonymous friends who arranged for him to receive a stipend and established him in the house called Ravenscroft in Wolseley Road, Farncombe, which was to remain his home for the rest of his life.

Much of Ward's work was peripatetic. He went on four annual tours round the country (three after 1926) visiting an average of fourteen different places, speaking to roughly two hundred individuals and hearing a thousand confessions. These tours took thirteen weeks a year; the rest of Ward's spiritual direction work was conducted from Ravenscroft, either in person or by correspondence. Even before arriving in Chiddingfold, Ward had established 'The Road', as he described it 'not a society, not an order, but a method of training in mystical prayer', which eventually comprised some hundreds of people; the first admitted, in March 1911, was his colleague in the Sunday School Institute, Deaconess Phyllis Dent. In 1918 Ward suffered a breakdown and repeatedly warned against overwork in clergy life. In 1920 an association of priests and others was formed under his supervision to promote spiritual direction and development within the Church of England. Ward's clientele was to include such Anglican leaders as Eric Abbott, Dean of Westminster; Michael Ramsey, Archbishop of Canterbury; and Evelyn Underhill, herself a notable spiritual director and writer.

Ward was a decided supporter of the ministry of women as it then existed in the Anglican Church in the form of the Deaconess movement. In 1923 he was made Warden of the Guildford and Portsmouth Diocesan Deaconess House; from 1925 to 1930 he was Chaplain of the Central House of the Order of Deaconesses at Hindhead, which he had helped establish. The membership of The Road was always predominately female, including a considerable number of ordained deaconesses, some of whom established their own Road groups in other countries. Some of his attitudes were more conservative, however: he was very opposed to divorce and approved of the excommunication of those who married others subsequent to divorcing, writing that in his own experience 'I had not found that God's love was marked by the removal of all penalties for my actions'. This is a good illustration that, however stern Ward might seem to others, it arose from austerity and sternness towards himself. On the other hand, Norman Goodacre recalled that, while waiting to make his confession to Ward, he would sometimes hear 'peals of laughter' from the priest and the previous penitent. Ward always stressed he was not a psychologist, but made use of some psychological techniques in his spiritual counselling: he always encouraged his penitents to examine their fears as well as their sins.

Ward served as an Honorary Chaplain to William Temple during his tenure as Archbishop of Canterbury, 1942–44.

After the Second World War, Ward began to curtail his activities, and stopped his touring ministry in 1949 following a heart attack; he handed much of his work to the network of spiritual directors he had established, especially the Reverend Norman Goodacre, then vicar of Coniston Cold in Yorkshire. Charlotte Ward died in 1953 and Reginald reduced his work still further. He was increasingly ill towards the end of his life, and when Archbishop Ramsey decided to award him the honorary Lambeth DD degree early in 1962, he was unfit to travel: the Archbishop came to Ravenscroft to confer the honour. Ward died in July that year and was remembered in a Requiem at Westminster Abbey on 8 October. Fittingly, Deaconess Edith Banks, the owner of Ravenscroft, then passed the house to Carol Graham, a deaconess who had served in the Church of South India, and who was establishing an ecumenical community of women devoted to prayer and spiritual work. Ward's body was cremated and his ashes laid to rest at the west end of Chiddingfold church, among other former rectors of the parish.

In 2004, a sculpture of Ward by Charles Gurrey of York, showing him kneeling in prayer, was added to the west front of Guildford Cathedral, alongside images of Michael Ramsey, Evelyn Underhill, and Bede Griffiths.

== Works ==
- The Way (Bungay: Richard Clay, 1922)
- Following the Way: Devotional Studies in Mystical Religion (London: St Christopher Press, 1925)
- Maximilien Robespierre: A Study in Deterioration (London: Macmillan & Co., 1934)
- A Guide for Spiritual Directors (London: Mowbray, 1957)
