= List of deans of King's College London =

The dean of King's College London is responsible for overseeing the spiritual development and welfare of all students and staff of the university. The Dean's Office is the first point of contact for any queries about religious provision at King's.

King's College is unique among British universities for having a Dean's Office, which is held by a priest of the Church of England. This role involves overseeing the spiritual development and welfare of all students and staff, as well as fostering vocations to ordained ministry within the worshipping community centered on its chapel.

The original royal charter of King's College London (in 1829) contains the explicit aim of ensuring that its students are provided with an education that considers carefully the spiritual dimension to life. In its history, King's College London deans have been central to this tradition. In earlier times this meant the work of the dean was central to the senior leadership of the college; when first established, Arthur Headlam, who was principal of King's, also held the office of dean. A number of the deans of King's went on to be cathedral deans or bishops.

Given that the present-day King's College London welcomes students and other individuals from a wide array of backgrounds, cultures and religions, and that the college now contends with the other challenges involved in being a research-focussed institution, the role of the dean has changed considerably. Currently the dean is not considered one of the senior officers of the college, but is effectively head of chaplaincy services, responsible for the university's provision of spiritual welfare for its diverse community of faiths, and for the unique Associateship of King's College program.

== Deans of King's College London ==
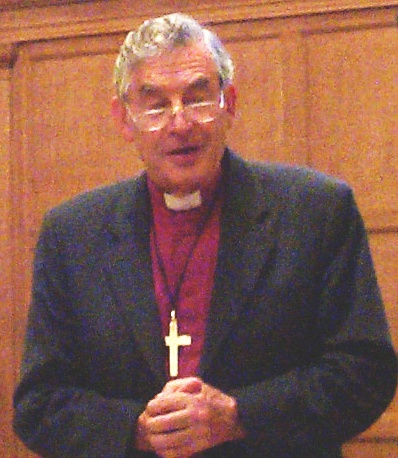
Richard Harries served as Dean of King's from 1980 to 1988

- Arthur Headlam (1903–1913) – later Bishop of Gloucester
- Alfred Caldecott (1913–1918)
- Walter Matthews (1918–1931) – became Dean of Exeter then Dean of St Paul's
- Richard Hanson (1932–1945)
- Eric Abbott (1945–1956) – became Dean of Westminster
- Sydney Evans (1956–1977) – became Dean of Salisbury
- Ulrich Simon (1977–1980)
- Richard Harries (1980–1987) – became Bishop of Oxford; now the Lord Harries of Pentegarth
- Reginald Askew (1988–1993)
- Leslie Houlden (1993–1994, acting)
- Richard Burridge (1994–2019)
- Timothy Ditchfield (2019–20, acting)
- Rev. Canon Dr. Ellen Clark-King (2020—)
