= Women's Legion =

British charitable organisation

Women's Legion was a British charitable organisation created in 1915 by Edith Vane-Tempest-Stewart, the Marchioness of Londonderry. Its first general secretary (to 1918) was Rose Bradley, daughter of George Granville Bradley, Dean of Westminster. It comprised volunteers who wore military-style uniforms and took on various duties within agriculture, canteen, cookery and motor transport sections. More than 40,000 women joined its forces.

In early 1918, it was renamed the War Service Legion as the organisation now included a Sailors' and Soldiers' work section and membership had expanded to include men. The original name of the Women's Legion was restored in 1919.

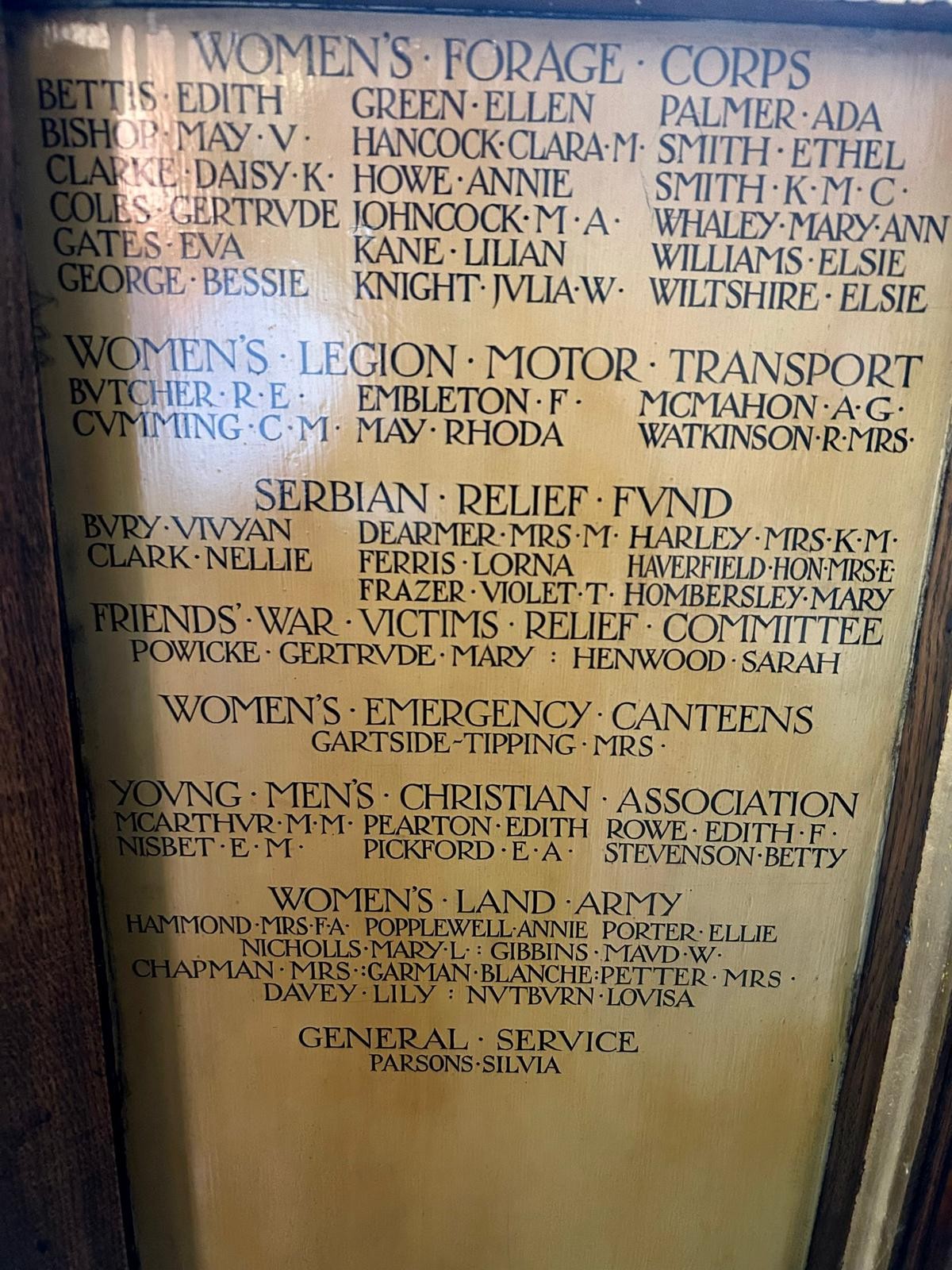
Oak panel from York Minster's Five Sisters window memorial, including those who died in the line of service from the Women's Legion

In 1925 the Five Sisters window at York Minster was rededicated to the 1,513 women who died in the line of service during WWI, including six women of the Women's Legion Motor Transport section.
