= Richard Burridge (priest) =

20th and 21st-century British Anglican priest and academic

The Reverend Canon Richard Burridge
- Dean of King's College London
- Church: Church of England
- In office: 1994 to 2019
- Predecessor: Reginald Askew
- Successor: Ellen Clark-King
- Other posts: Canon Theologian, Salisbury Cathedral (2013–present)

Orders
- Ordination: 1985 (deacon); 1986 (priest)

Personal details
- Born: Richard Alan Burridge; 11 June 1955 (age 71)
- Denomination: Anglicanism
- Spouse: Susan Morgan (m. 1979; div. 2009) Megan Warner (m. 2014)
- Children: Two
- Education: University College, Oxford (MA); University of Nottingham

Richard Alan Burridge (born 11 June 1955) is a Church of England priest, biblical scholar and a former Dean of King's College London.

== Early life and education ==
Burridge was born on 11 June 1955 to Alan Burridge and Iris Joyce Burridge (née Coates). Burridge played guitar in the band Exousia in the 1970s, and continues to record as a solo artist. He was educated at University College, Oxford, where he received an MA, and then at the University of Nottingham, where he read for a PhD. His doctoral thesis on the genre of the gospels was published in 1992 as What are the Gospels? A Comparison with Graeco-Roman Biography. It played a part in establishing that the Gospels were read as biographies in the first centuries after Christ, and that they belonged to a recognised literary genre of biographies rather than being unprecedented writings which reflected the faith and life of the post-Easter church.

== Career ==
=== Early career ===
Burridge's early career was as a school teacher. From 1978 to 1982, he was a schoolmaster teaching classics and a house tutor at Sevenoaks School, a private school in Sevenoaks, Kent.

=== Ordained ministry ===
Burridge trained for the Anglican priesthood at St John's College, Nottingham. He was ordained deacon in 1985 and priest in 1986 and was curate at St Peter and St Paul, Bromley, Kent (1985–1987).

=== His Magnum Opus: What Are the Gospels? (1992) ===
Before the publication of Burridge's gold-standard book What Are the Gospels?, biblical scholars had spent nearly a century believing that the Gospels were a unique, standalone literary genre (sui generis). They were viewed merely as theological tracts of early Christian communities rather than historical accounts of a life.

Ironically, Burridge began his doctoral research with the explicit goal of proving that the Gospels were not biographies. As one of the first in his field to do so, he decided to investigate this using computer-assisted textual analysis. He programmed software to compare the structure, verbs, composition, and grammatical subjects of the four Gospels with ten well-known Greco-Roman bioi (such as those by Plutarchus and Suetonius).The data forced him into a radical change of course: from a literary standpoint, the Gospels turned out to match classical ancient biographies exactly. Since then, his thesis has become the global academic consensus.

=== Why This Work Is So Significant ===
Burridge's discovery had major theological implications: In the 20th century, biblical scholarship focused heavily on the communities behind the texts (who wrote them and why?). Burridge reminded the academic world that a biography, by definition, revolves around its subject: the person of Jesus Christ himself. Explanation for Differences: Since the Gospels are ancient biographies, it is only logical that stories are arranged thematically rather than strictly chronologically. This removed the need for theologians to strain to harmonize every timeline.

=== Other Important Books by Burridge ===
Four Gospels, One Jesus? (1994): A much more accessible book (written for students and interested general readers) in which he separately analyzes the literary style and unique theological 'character sketch' of each of the four evangelists.

Imitating Jesus: An Inclusive Approach to New Testament Ethics (2007): A comprehensive work exploring how the biographical nature of the Gospels influences how Christians make ethical choices today and how they are to follow Jesus.

=== Academic career ===
Burridge was Dean of King's College London 1994–2019, and he was elected as a Fellow of King's College (FKC) in 2002. From 2007 to 2012, he was Director of New Testament Studies, and in 2008 he was appointed to a Personal Chair in Biblical Interpretation. He was a member of the Church of England's General Synod, and chaired their validation panel for ordination training and theological education (1996–2004); he is currently serving as a representative of the Church Commissioners and as deputy chair on the Church of England's Ethical Investment Advisory Group. He was a trustee of Cumberland Lodge between 1998 and 2008.

=== Special Recognition: The Ratzinger Prize (2013) ===
In 2013, Burridge made history when he was awarded the prestigious Ratzinger Prize (often called the 'Nobel Prize for Theology') by Pope Francis. He was the first-ever non-Roman Catholic theologian to receive this highest academic honor from the Vatican.

== Role at King's College London ==
The Dean of King's College London is an ordained person responsible for overseeing the spiritual development and welfare of all students and staff as well as fostering vocations among the worshipping community.

When King's was founded in 1829 it was with the express purpose of ensuring that its students received an education that took seriously the religious dimension to life. Throughout the history of King's its deans have been key people in ensuring this continues. The college motto, sancte et sapienter ("with holiness and with wisdom"), reflects both the college's Anglican foundation and its continuing commitment to religious life and theological education.

The modern-day King's includes members from a wide array of backgrounds, cultures and faiths. Today the dean is responsible for the university's provision for its diverse religious community. Richard Burridge retired as Dean of King's College London in 2019.

== Personal life ==
In 1979, Burridge married Susan Morgan; they divorced in 2009. Together they had two daughters. In 2014, he married Megan Warner.

== Selected publications ==
=== Books ===
- Burridge, Richard A. (1992). What are the Gospels? A Comparison with Graeco-Roman Biography. Society for New Testament Studies - Monograph series. Vol. 70. Grand Rapids, MI: Eerdmans. ISBN 9780521412292. OCLC 23901330. - revision of his doctoral thesis.
- ——— (1994). Four Gospels, One Jesus?: a symbolic reading. Grand Rapids, MI: Eerdmans. ISBN 9780802808769. OCLC 933917569.
- ——— (1998). John. The People's Bible Commentary. Oxford: Bible Reading Fellowship. ISBN 9781841010298. OCLC 875023073.
- ——— (2000). Faith Odyssey: A Journey Through Life. Oxford: Bible Reading Fellowship. ISBN 9780802809742. OCLC 52738284.
- ——— (2000). Faith Odyssey: A Journey Through Lent. Oxford: Bible Reading Fellowship. ISBN 9781841011899. OCLC 54047839.
- ———; Gould, Graham (2004). Jesus Now and Then. Grand Rapids, MI: Eerdmans. ISBN 9780802809773. OCLC 54024131.
- ——— (2007). Imitating Jesus: An Inclusive Approach to New Testament Ethics. Grand Rapids, MI: Eerdmans. ISBN 9780802844583. OCLC 799877369.

=== Articles and chapters ===
- ——— (2006). "Reading the Gospels as Biography". In McGing, Brian C.; Mossman, Judith (eds.). The Limits of Ancient Biography. Swansea: Classical Press of Wales. pp. 31–49. ISBN 9781905125128. OCLC 85369560.
- ——— (2006). "Genres of the New Testament: Gospels". In Rogerson, John W.; Lieu, Judith M. (eds.). Oxford Handbook of Biblical Studies. Oxford, UK: Oxford University Press. pp. 514–29. ISBN 9780199254255. OCLC 475665834.
- ——— (2005). "Who Writes, Why and For Whom?". In Bockmuehl, Markus; Hagner, Donald A. (eds.). The Written Gospel. Cambridge, UK: Cambridge University Press. pp. 99–115. ISBN 9780521540407. OCLC 938145179.
- ——— (2000). "Gospel Genre, Christological Controversy and the Absence of Rabbinic Biography: Some Implications of the Biographical Hypothesis". In Horrell, David G.; Tuckett, Christopher M. (eds.). Christology, Controversy, and Community: New Testament Essays in Honour of David R. Catchpole. Supplements to Novum Testamentum. Vol. 99. Leiden: Brill. pp. 137–56. ISBN 9789004116795. OCLC 797444812.
