= Grimley =

Grimley may mean:

- Grimley, Worcestershire - a village in England
- Ed Grimley - a television character
- Martyn Grimley (born 1963) - a former field hockey player
- Robert William Grimley, dean of the Diocese of Bristol.

See also:

- The Grimleys - a television comedy series
