= Alan Don =

The Very Reverend Alan Don KCVO
- Dean of Westminster
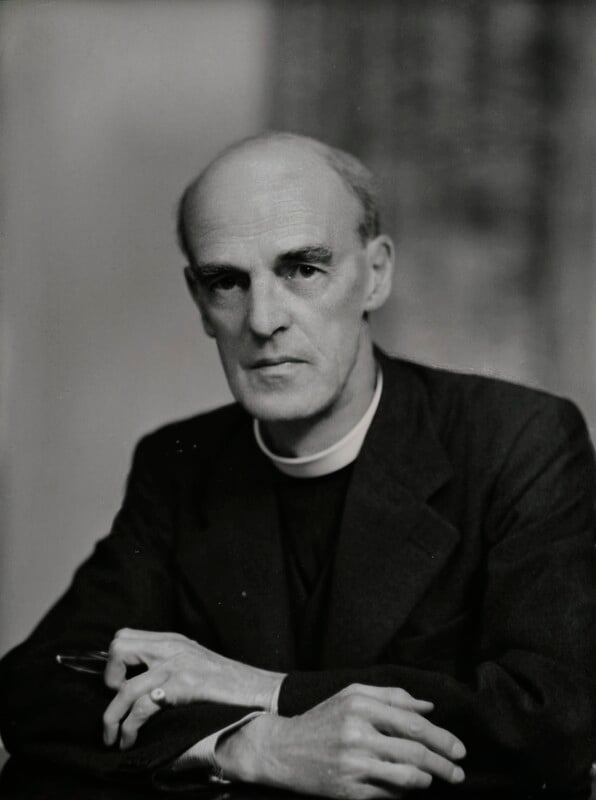
- Don in 1952
- Church: Church of England
- Diocese: Royal Peculiar
- In office: 1946–1959
- Predecessor: Paul de Labilliere
- Successor: Eric Abbott
- Other posts: Chaplain to the Speaker of the House of Commons (1936–1946); Chaplain and Secretary to the Archbishop of Canterbury (1931–1941); Provost of St Paul's Cathedral, Dundee (1921–1931)

Orders
- Ordination: 1917

Personal details
- Born: 3 January 1885 Dundee, UK
- Died: 3 May 1966 (aged 81)
- Denomination: Anglican
- Spouse: Muriel Gwenda McConnel
- Education: Magdalen College, Oxford

Alan Campbell Don KCVO (3 January 1885 – 3 May 1966) was a trustee of the National Portrait Gallery, editor of the Scottish Episcopal Church's 1929 Scottish Prayer Book, chaplain and secretary to Cosmo Lang, Archbishop of Canterbury, from 1931 to 1941, Chaplain to the Speaker of the House of Commons from 1936 to 1946 and Dean of Westminster from 1946 to 1959.

== Early life and ordained ministry ==
Born into a manufacturing Dundee family, the son of Robert Bogle Don and Lucy Flora Campbell, he was educated at Rugby and Magdalen College, Oxford. Deciding the family business was not for him, studied for ordination at Cuddesdon College before becoming a curate in Redcar followed by an incumbency in Yorkshire.

There then followed a 10-year period as provost of St. Paul's Scottish Episcopal (Anglican) Cathedral in his native city. In 1927 he commissioned Dundee architect Patrick Thoms to design his house.

From 1931 until 1941 he was secretary to Cosmo Gordon Lang and was on record as being scathingly critical of the Rev. Robert Anderson Jardine, of Darlington, who, against the rules of the Church of England, conducted the wedding of the Duke of Windsor and Wallis Warfield in 1937. He became a chaplain to King George V. Already the Speaker's chaplain in 1941 he became a canon of Westminster Abbey as rector of St. Margaret's, Westminster, commonly called "the parish church of the House of Commons". His brother was Air Vice Marshal Francis Don.

== Dean of Westminster ==
This was followed in 1946 by elevation to the post of Dean of Westminster, a post he was to hold for 13 years, a period which included the Queen's Coronation One other event in his time as Dean was the theft of the Stone of Scone just prior to the Coronation. As a Scot, Don felt this theft acutely and was important to the return of the Coronation Stone to Westminster.

== Retirement ==
He retired to Canterbury where, although he was married, (Note: To Muriel née McConnell, from 1914 until her death in 1963) he and his wife met only once a week for lunch. He died on 3 May 1966. Don's diaries, covering the period 1931-1946 and edited by Robert Beaken, were published in 2020.

== Honours ==
Don was appointed a Knight Commander of the Royal Victorian Order (KCVO) in the 1948 New Year Honours.

== Arms ==
Coat of arms of Alan Don

Motto
Non Deerit Alter Avres
