= Richard Harries, Baron Harries of Pentregarth =

Church of England bishop (1936–2026)

The Right Reverend and Right Honourable The Lord Harries of Pentregarth FRSL FLSW FKC
- Bishop of Oxford
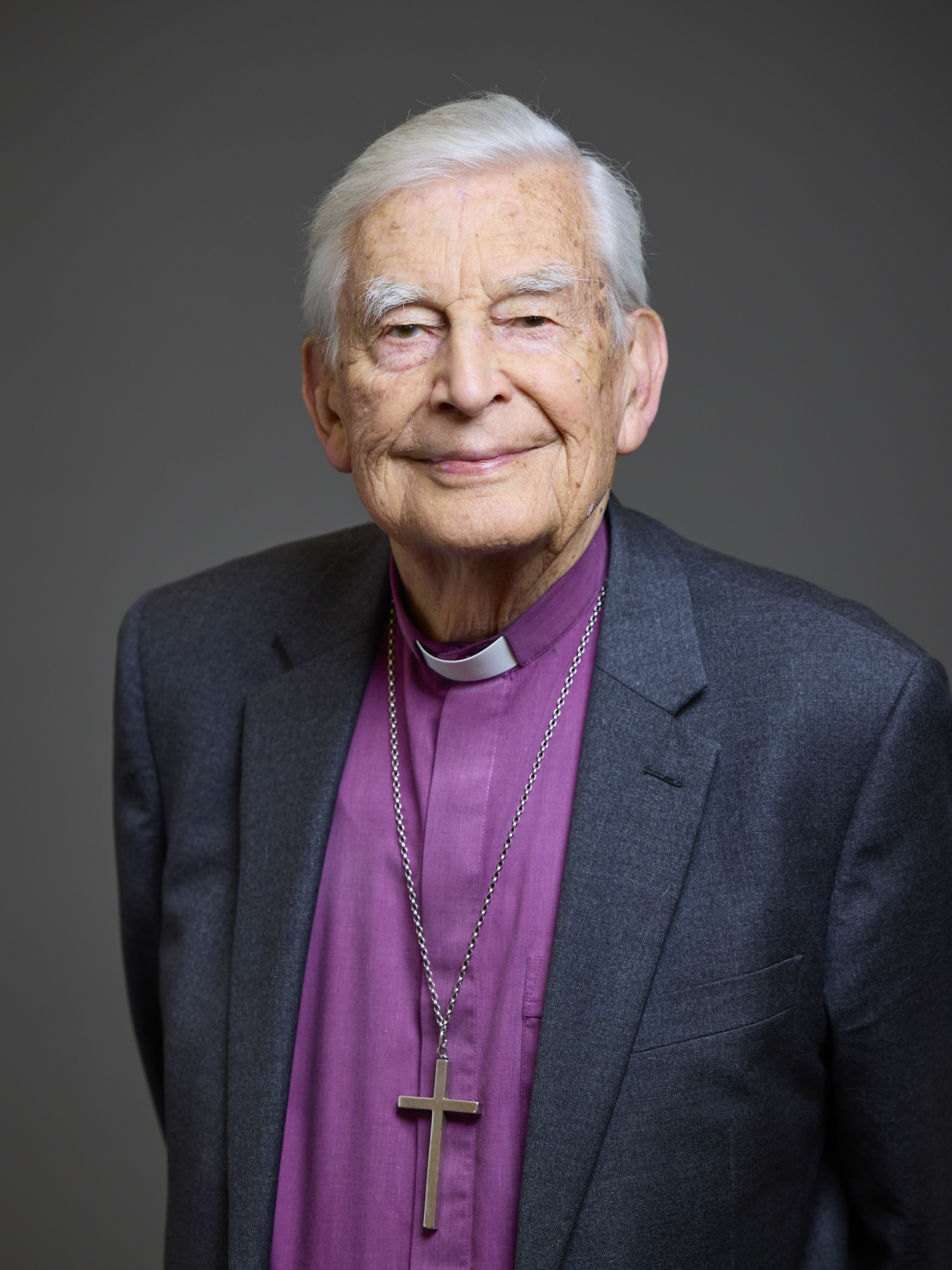
- Official portrait, 2026
- Church: Church of England
- Diocese: Oxford
- In office: 1987 – 2 June 2006 (retired)
- Predecessor: Patrick Rodger
- Successor: John Pritchard
- Other posts: Dean of King's College London (1981–1987); Gresham Professor of Divinity (1 September 2008 – 2012)

Orders
- Ordination: 1963 (deacon); 1964 (priest)
- Consecration: 28 May 1987, St Paul's Cathedral by Robert Runcie, Archbishop of Canterbury

Personal details
- Born: 2 June 1936 Eltham, London, England
- Died: 29 April 2026 (aged 89)
- Denomination: Anglican
- Spouse: Josephine Bottomley
- Children: 2
- Education: Wellington College; Royal Military Academy, Sandhurst
- Alma mater: Selwyn College, Cambridge

Member of the House of Lords
- Lord Temporal
- Life peerage 30 June 2006 – 29 April 2026
- Lord Spiritual
- Bishop of Oxford; 4 November 1993 – 2 June 2006

Personal details
- Party: None (crossbencher)

Military service
- Allegiance: United Kingdom
- Rank: Lieutenant
- Unit: British Army; Territorial Army
- Commands: Royal Corps of Signals

Richard Douglas Harries, Baron Harries of Pentregarth (2 June 1936 – 29 April 2026) was a Church of England bishop and a British Army officer. He was the Bishop of Oxford from 1987 to 2006. From 2008 until 2012 he was the Gresham Professor of Divinity.

== Early life, education, and army career ==
Richard Douglas Harries was born in Eltham, London, on 2 June 1936. He was educated at Wellington College and Royal Military Academy Sandhurst. Harries was commissioned as a second lieutenant in the Royal Corps of Signals on 16 December 1955 and was promoted to lieutenant two years later. He left the active Regular Army on 12 September 1958, transferring to the reserve of officers. He went to Selwyn College, Cambridge, where he studied theology (BA 1961, MA 1965) before going to Cuddesdon College (1961–63) to study for ordination. He formally resigned his original army commission on 18 March 1965, but was immediately recommissioned as Chaplain to the Forces 4th Class (equivalent in rank to captain) in the Territorial Army. On 29 October 1969, he once more transferred to the reserve.

== Church ministry ==
Harries was made a deacon in 1963, becoming assistant curate of Hampstead St John in the Diocese of London (1963–69). He was ordained a priest the following year and later combined his ministry at St John's with the chaplaincy of the former Westfield College (now part of Queen Mary, University of London) (1967–69). He became a tutor at Wells Theological College (1969–71) and was then warden of the new Salisbury and Wells Theological College (1971–72).

He returned to parish ministry as vicar of All Saints' Fulham (1972–1981) and returned to academia as Dean of King's College London (1981–1987). He was appointed Bishop of Oxford in 1987, being consecrated on 28 May at St Paul's Cathedral by Robert Runcie, Archbishop of Canterbury, and taking a seat as a Lord Spiritual in the House of Lords in 1993. In 1999 he was appointed to the royal commission (chaired by John Wakeham) to investigate a possible reorganisation of the House of Lords, which produced the Wakeham Report. He retired on 2 June 2006, his 70th birthday.

In the week prior to his retirement, on 26 May 2006, Downing Street announced that he was to be made a life peer. He was gazetted as Baron Harries of Pentregarth, of Ceinewydd in the County of Dyfed on 30 June 2006. He sat as a cross-bencher. On 4 August 2006, he was appointed to the Court of Ecclesiastical Causes Reserved for a period of five years.

== Other activities ==
In 1986, Harries took up a subsidiary appointment as consultant to the archbishops of Canterbury and York on inter-faith relations. As Bishop of Oxford he became a founder member of the Oxford Abrahamic Group, bringing together Christian, Muslim, and Jewish scholars. He chaired the Council of Christians and Jews from 1992 until 2001.

In 1988 he was president of the Johnson Society, delivering a presidential address on "Johnson – A Church of England Saint".

He was a member of the Human Fertilisation and Embryology Authority (including serving as chair of the HFEA Ethics and Law Committee) and a member of the Nuffield Council on Bioethics, as well as chairing the House of Lords select committee on stem cell research. He was chairman of the Church of England Board for Social Responsibility (1996–2001) and chairman of the House of Bishops' Working Party on Issues in Human Sexuality and served on the board of Christian Aid. He was also a member of the Royal Commission on the Reform of the House of Lords (the Wakeham Commission).

A regular contributor to the Today programme on BBC Radio 4, including many appearances on Thought for the Day, he published three books of radio talks. He was a patron of POWER International, a charity working with disabled people in poor countries.

Harries was a member of the Nuffield Council on Bioethics (2002–2008). In 2002 he was visiting professor at Liverpool Hope University College. In 2008 he replaced Keith Ward as the Gresham Professor of Divinity.

Harries insisted that there was no conflict between science and religion. He was critical of both outspoken atheists and creationists: "From time to time, I see American creationist magazines with articles by people claiming to have doctorates in science. Judging religion only on the basis of its least credible examples is as though I judged all science on the basis of creationist science."

He served as an advisory steering group member for the Commission on Religion and Belief in British Public Life.

Harries was the author of 26 books on the interface of Christian faith and wider culture, including ethics, politics and the arts, especially the visual arts. These include The Passion in Art (Ashgate 2004) and Art and the Beauty of God (Continuum 2000), which was chosen as a book of the year by the Anthony Burgess in The Observer when it was originally published in 1993. The Re-Enchantment of Morality (SPCK 2008) was shortlisted for the 2011 Michael Ramsey prize for theological writing. The Image of Christ in Modern Art was published by Ashgate in October 2013.

He reviewed books regularly for the Church Times.

== Death ==
Harries died after a short illness on 29 April 2026 at the age of 89. His death occurred on the same day the House of Lords (Hereditary Peers) Act 2026 came into effect which removed the 92 hereditary peers from the House of Lords.

== Legacy and reputation ==
Harries' passion for social justice influenced his liberal views. At the start of his episcopacy, he brought legal proceedings challenging the Church Commissioners' policy on investment. He and his co-plaintiffs argued that the Church Commissioners placed too much emphasis on purely financial considerations and insufficient emphasis upon the promotion of the Christian faith. Although this challenge failed – the Commissioners already had an ethical investment policy, albeit one which excluded a smaller part of the UK share market than the plaintiffs had wanted to exclude – the Court recognised that it was proper for charities to consider whether their investment strategies would alienate the charity's financial supporters.

In 1996, Harries formed part of a working group of church leaders looking to address the increasing numbers of homeless in west London. Harries and the other original founders championed the need for an open-access shelter that welcomed all in need, regardless of local connection, religion or nationality. The group, formerly known as West London Churches Homeless Concern, gained charity status in 2000 and changed its name to "Glass Door" in 2014. It continues to operate church-based homeless shelters across central and south-west London.

In 2014, Harries stated in the House of Lords that the next British coronation in Westminster Abbey should feature readings from the Quran, the holy book of Islam.

On 11 February 2017, Harries was one of 14 retired bishops to sign an open letter to the then-serving bishops of the Church of England. In an unprecedented move, they expressed their opposition to the House of Bishops' report to General Synod on sexuality, which recommended no change to the church's canons or practices around sexuality. By 13 February, a serving bishop (Alan Wilson, Bishop of Buckingham) and nine further retired bishops had added their signatures; on 15 February, the report was rejected by synod.

== Honours ==
Harries was appointed a Fellow of King's College London (FKC) in 1983, a Fellow of the Royal Society of Literature (FRSL) in 1996, and an honorary fellow of the Academy of Medical Sciences in 2004. In 1994 he became a Doctor of Divinity honoris causa of the University of London and in 2001 he was honoured with the degree of Doctor of the University (DUniv) by Oxford Brookes University.

In 2012, he was awarded the President's Medal by the British Academy.

In 2012, he was elected a Fellow of the Learned Society of Wales (FLSW).

== Bibliography ==
- Prayers of Hope (BBC, 1975) ISBN 0 563 12828 3
- Turning to Prayer (Mowbray, 1978), ISBN 0-264-66492-2
- Prayers of Grief and Glory (Lutterworth Press, 1979), ISBN 0-7188-2424-5
- Being a Christian (Mowbray, 1981), ISBN 0-264-66561-9 (published in the U.S. as What Christians Believe)
- Should a Christian Support Guerrillas? (Lutterworth Press, 1982), ISBN 0-7188-2517-9
- What Hope in an Armed World? (Pickering & Inglis, 1982), ISBN 0-7208-0526-0 (ed.)
- The Authority of Divine Love (Blackwell, 1983), ISBN 0-631-13205-8
- Praying Round the Clock (Mowbray, 1983), ISBN 0-264-66795-6
- Seasons of the Spirit: Readings Through the Christian Year (ed. with George Every and Kallistos Ware) (SPCK, 1984), ISBN 0-281-04090-7 (published in the U.S. as The Time of the Spirit)
- Morning Has Broken: Thoughts and Prayers from BBC Radio 4's "Today" Programme (Marshalls, 1985), ISBN 0-551-01178-5
- Prayer and the Pursuit of Happiness (Fount, 1985), ISBN 0-00-626650-9
- Reinhold Niebuhr and the Issues of Our Time (Mowbray, 1986), ISBN 0-264-67051-5 (ed.)
- Christianity & War in a Nuclear Age (Mowbray, 1986), ISBN 0-264-67053-1
- The One Genius: Readings Through the Year with Austin Farrer (SPCK, 1987), ISBN 0-281-04269-1
- Christ Is Risen (Mowbray, 1987), ISBN 0-264-67107-4
- Evidence for the Love of God (Mowbray, 1987), ISBN 0-264-67115-5
- C. S. Lewis: The Man and His God (Fount, 1987), ISBN 0-00-627143-X
- Shalom and Pax: Christian Concepts of Peace (Oxford Project for Peace Studies, 1990), ISBN 1-871191-21-1
- Is There a Gospel for the Rich?: Christian Obedience in a Capitalist World (Mowbray, 1992), ISBN 0-264-67276-3
- Art and the Beauty of God: A Christian Understanding (Mowbray, 1993), ISBN 0-264-67306-9
- The Real God: A Response to Anthony Freeman's "God in Us" (Mowbray, 1994), ISBN 0-264-67384-0
- A Gallery of Reflections: The Nativity of Christ (Lion, 1995), ISBN 0-7459-2826-9
- Questioning Belief (SPCK, 1995), ISBN 0-281-04885-1
- Two Cheers for Secularism (Pilkington Press, 1998), ISBN 1-899044-16-7 (ed. with Sidney Brichto)
- In the Gladness of Today: Thoughts for the Day (Fount, 1999), ISBN 0-00-628149-4
- Christianity: Two Thousand Years (Oxford University Press, 2001), ISBN 0-19-924485-5 (ed. with Henry Mayr-Harting)
- Hearing God in Poetry (SPCK, 2001) ISBN 9780281086290
- God Outside the Box: Why Spiritual People Object to Christianity (SPCK, 2002), ISBN 0-281-05522-X
- After the Evil: Christianity and Judaism in the Shadow of the Holocaust (Oxford University Press, 2003), ISBN 0-19-926313-2
- The Passion in Art (Ashgate, 2004), ISBN 0-7546-5010-3
- Abraham's Children: Jews, Christians and Muslims in Conversation (T&T Clark, 2005), ISBN 0-567-08171-0 (ed. with Norman Solomon and Tim Winter and Dale Harries)
- The Re-enchantment of Morality: Wisdom for a Troubled World (SPCK, 2008) ISBN 9780281059478
- Faith in Politics? Rediscovering the Christian Roots of our Political Values (Darton Longman and Todd, 2010) ISBN 9780232527872
- Issues of Life and Death: Christian Faith and Medical Intervention (2010)
- Reinhold Niebuhr and Contemporary Politics. God and Power (editor, 2010) ISBN 9780199571833
- The Image of Christ in Modern Art (Ashgate 2013), ISBN 978-1-4094-6382-5
- Haunted by Christ: Modern Writers and the Struggle for Faith (SPCK, 2018) ISBN 9780281079339
- Majesty: Reflections on the Life of Christ with Queen Elizabeth II, Featuring Fifty Best-loved Paintings, from the Nativity to the Resurrection (SPCK, 2023) ISBN 9780281089475

== See also ==
- Harries v The Church Commissioners for England
