= Common Sense (book series) =

1960s British political book series

The Common Sense series included thirteen political books published by Victor Gollancz Ltd in the United Kingdom during the early 1960s. They were intended to provide a general objective background on a particular topic and were addressed at the general reader who did not have specialised knowledge of the field. They were generally well received.

== Books in series ==
1. Conquest, Robert (1960). Common sense about Russia. London: Gollancz.
2. Wint, Guy (1960). Common sense about China. London: Gollancz.
3. Sampson, Anthony (1960). Common sense about Africa. London: Gollancz.
4. Panikkar, K. M. (1960). Common sense about India. London: Gollancz.
5. Childers, Erskine B. (1960). Common sense about the Arab world. London: Gollancz.
6. Rolph, C. H. (1961). Common sense about crime and punishment. London: Gollancz.
7. Mason, Philip (1961). Common sense about race. London: Gollancz.
8. Hadham, John (1961). Common sense about religion. London: Gollancz.
9. Carpenter, Edward (1961). Common sense about Christian ethics. London: Gollancz.
10. Calder, Ritchie (1962). Common sense about a starving world. London: Gollancz.
11. Wills, W. David (1962). Common sense about young offenders. London: Gollancz.
12. Cahn, Edmond (1962). Common sense about democracy; or, The predicament of democratic man. London: Gollancz.
13. Bailey, Sherwin (1962). Common sense about sexual ethics : a Christian view. London: Gollancz.
