= William Foxley Norris =

English clergyman (1859–1937)

The Very Reverend William Foxley Norris KCVO
- Dean of Westminster
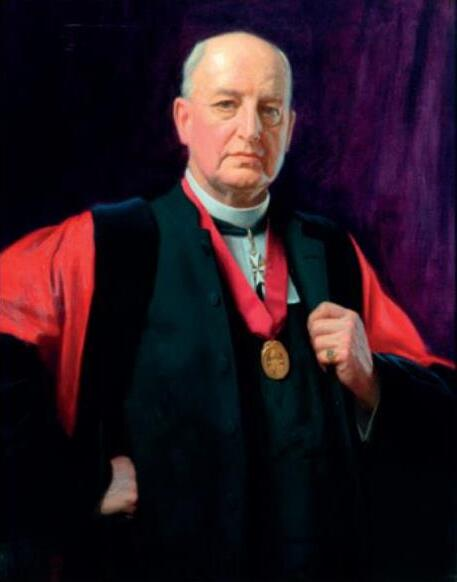
- Church: Church of England
- In office: 1925–1937
- Predecessor: Herbert Edward Ryle
- Successor: Paul de Labilliere
- Other post: Dean of York (1917–1925)

Personal details
- Born: 4 February 1859
- Died: 28 September 1937 (aged 78)
- Denomination: Anglicanism
- Education: Trinity College, Oxford

William Foxley Norris KCVO (4 February 1859 – 28 September 1937) was Dean of York between 1917 and 1925 and of Westminster from then until his death in 1937.

Born into a clerical family, he was educated at Charterhouse and Trinity College, Oxford, before taking holy orders at Leeds Clergy School. After curacies in Eton and Chatham he embarked on a career that was to take him from pastoral (Incumbencies in Oxfordshire and Yorkshire) to administrative (Diocesan Educational Inspector) posts before a steady rise up the ecclesiastical ladder. He was successively Rural Dean of Silkstone, Rector of Barnsley, and Archdeacon of Halifax. In July 1902 he was appointed an honorary Canon of Wakefield Cathedral.

He became Dean of York in 1917, serving as such until 1925 when he was appointed Dean of Westminster. An exceptionally talented artist he wrote widely on church treasures. A much respected cleric, he died on 28 September 1937 and was buried in Westminster Abbey.

His grandson was Air Chief Marshal Sir Christopher Foxley-Norris the Battle of Britain pilot who went on to have a distinguished air force career.

Church of England titles
Preceded by Arthur Purey-Cust	Dean of York; 1917–1925	Succeeded by Lionel Ford
Preceded by Herbert Edward Ryle	Dean of Westminster; 1925–1937	Succeeded by Paul de Labilliere
