= James Parkes (priest) =

Theologian from Guernsey (1896–1981)

James William Parkes (22 December 1896 – 10 August 1981) was an Anglican clergyman, soldier, historian, and social activist. With the publication of The Jew and His Neighbour in 1929, he created the foundations of a Christian re-evaluation of Judaism. He also published under the pseudonym John Hadham.

== Early life ==
Parkes was born in Guernsey on the Channel Islands in 1896. He was the son of an English-born tomato grower, and had two siblings, David and Molly. Parkes was educated at Elizabeth College. Parkes lost his mother at the age of 14, and lost both of his siblings during the First World War. While at school, he won an Open Scholarship to Hertford College, Oxford, but joined up to fight in the war. He enlisted as a Private in the Artists Rifles and went out to France, but was immediately hospitalised for three months with a serious illness contracted from drinking contaminated water. Afterwards he was commissioned into the Queen's (Royal West Surrey Regiment) as a Second lieutenant and posted to the 3rd (Reserve) Battalion, Queen's at Sittingbourne. From there he was sent in the winter of 1916–17 to join the 10th (Service) Battalion, Queen's (Battersea) in the Ypres Salient. As well as commanding a platoon, he became the battalion's unofficial war artist. He participated in the Battle of Messines on 7 June 1917. On the opening day of the Third Battle of Ypres, 1 August, the battalion's pre-dawn approach march was disrupted by heavy shelling and a guide who got lost. Of A Company, only Parkes and about 50 men reached their first objective, 'Battle Wood', where they held on for the rest of the day. The enemy shelled the wood with Mustard gas and Parkes had to be evacuated a few days later with temporary blindness. Although his sight returned he was never fit enough to return to the Front, and spent the rest of the war in reserve battalions and running an anti-gas school.

== Higher education and activism ==
After returning from the war, he went back to Oxford to complete his degree in theology, and did so, despite catching measles in the middle of his final exams. After graduating, Parkes became a leading member of the Student Christian Movement before joining the International Student Service in Geneva. He then went on to study for ordination in the Anglican Church, and spent the next 12 years on the continent as an activist in organizations that promoted international cooperation. It was there that he grew aware of the brutality of antisemitism and very early on spoke out about Nazism, surviving an assassination attempt in 1935.

Upon his return to England, he carved out a career as an independent scholar. Parkes contributed to several British publications, including The Observer, The Jewish Chronicle, Punch and Peace News. He also wrote Common sense about religion, as part of the Common Sense series.

== Judaism and Christianity ==
Parkes was drawn to his study of Jewish–Christian relations by first-hand exposure to the brutality of antisemitism on the continent. Parkes traced its animus to the obdurate hard-heartedness and wrongheadedness of Christianity vis-à-vis the Jewish people and their faith. He held that the principles and practice of historic Christianity was responsible for the sins and excesses that culminated in the Holocaust. His life's work amounted not only to hundreds of articles and twenty-three books, among them The Conflict of the Church and the Synagogue (1934), his magnum opus, but also to social activism. According to one historian, Parkes "devoted his whole life to fighting anti-Judaism and promoting tolerance of Jews".

He was known as one of the few clerical voices against the missionizing of Jews and was considered to be the driving force in the founding of the Council of Christians and Jews.

== The Parkes Library ==
After a period of ill-health, Parkes was eager to pass his library and Judaica collection on so it could be used by future generations. In 1964, Parkes was approached by David Gwilym James, the University of Southampton's second Vice-Chancellor, who asked Parkes to consider donating his library to the collection at the university. Parkes accepted the offer and the Parkes Library at the university was officially opened on 23 June 1965. By the time the Library was transferred to Southampton University Library in 1964 it amounted to over 4,000 books, 2,000 pamphlets and 140 journals. It has continued to grow, and is now one of the largest Jewish documentation centres in Europe, with over 30,000 books and journals, published from the 15th century to the present day.

== Later life and legacy ==
In August 1964 James and his wife, Dorothy, moved from Barley to Iwerne Minster in Dorset. Parkes continued to write, including his autobiography, Voyage of Discoveries (1969), and many pamphlets and articles. He also continued to write thousands of letters, many of which now reside in the Parkes Collection at the University of Southampton Parkes Library and Archive. On 10 August 1981, Parkes died at the age of 84. He was survived by Dorothy, to whom he bequeathed his entire estate. Parkes' papers were later donated to the University of Southampton Special Collections and can be viewed at the Hartley Library archive.

The Parkes Institute for the Study of Jewish/non-Jewish Relations at the University of Southampton was formed in the memory of Parkes, and created in line with Parkes’ desire to create an international research centre to home his collections and archive. The institute is now an established academic research centre which teaches undergraduates, postgraduates, and doctoral candidates alongside a public outreach programme and a range of events and seminars.

Parkes has been memorialised in an exhibition, 'James Parkes and the Age of Intolerance', which launched in Southampton in January 2019 before going on to tour the United Kingdom. The exhibition was digitised by the Parkes Institute in 2021 as part of the 40th anniversary commemorations of Parkes' death.

== Partial publications list ==
- Parkes, James (1930). The Jew and his Neighbour: A Study in the Causes of Anti-Semitism. London: Student Christian Movement Press.
- Parkes, James (1934). The Conflict of the Church and the Synagogue: A Study in the Origins of Antisemitism. A history of antisemitism. London: Soncino Press. OCLC 251999287.
  - Republished as Parkes, James (1961). The Conflict of the church and the synagogue. USA: Meridian books & Jewish Publication Society of America. OCLC 490770846.
- Parkes, James (1938). The Jew as Userer : Adapted from The Jew in the Medieval Community. Toronto: Committee on Jewish Gentile Relationships.
- Parkes, James (1939). The Jewish Problem in the Modern World. London: Butterworth. ; 1st American ed. (New York: Oxford University Press, 1946)
- Hadham, John (1940). Good God: Sketches of his character and activities. Penguin special. Harmondsworth, Middlesex, England: Penguin Books. OCLC 270805293.
  - Republished as Hadham, John (1965). Good God: Sketches of his character and activities. Forward Movement Pub. OCLC 455861398.
- Hadham, John (1941). God in a world at war. Penguin special. Vol. 73. Penguin Books. OCLC 313509833.
- Hadham, John (1942). Between God and man. London: Longmans. OCLC 69196040.
- Parkes, James (1943). An Enemy of the People : Antisemitism. Harmondsworth, Middlesex, England: Pelican Books.
- Hadham, John (1944). God and human progress. Penguin. OCLC 1292672741.
- Parkes, James (1946). The Emergence of the Jewish Problem, 1878–1939. London: Oxford.
- Parkes, James (1948). Judaism and Christianity. Chicago: University Press.
- Parkes, James (1962). God at work: In science, politics and human life. London: Putnam. OCLC 613715258.
- Parkes, James (1969). Prelude to Dialogue : Christian-Jewish Relationships. New York: Schocken.
- Parkes, James (1970). Whose Land? A History of the Peoples of Palestine. Harmondsworth, Middlesex, England: Pelican Books.
