= Edward Carpenter (priest) =

British priest

Edward Frederick Carpenter
- Carpenter in 1956
- Title: Dean of Westminster

Personal life
- Born: 27 November 1910
- Died: 26 August 1998 (aged 87)

Religious life
- Religion: Church of England

Senior posting
- Period in office: 1974–1985
- Predecessor: Eric Abbott
- Successor: Michael Mayne

Edward Frederick Carpenter KCVO (27 November 1910 – 26 August 1998) was an Anglican priest and author.

== Life ==
Carpenter was a native Londoner and the city featured prominently in his life and priestly ministry. He was educated at Strode's Grammar School and King's College London and ordained in 1936. After curacies at Holy Trinity, Marylebone and St Mary's Harrow he was Rector of Great Stanmore.

After this his ministry was spent at Westminster Abbey, from 1951 firstly as a canon, then from 1963 to 1974 as archdeacon and finally, from 1974, Dean of Westminster. One obituary noted "It was unfortunate for the Church that Edward Carpenter was 64 before he became Dean but he has left a legacy of tolerant, determined openness as a vital trait of 20th- century Christianity. He and his wife gave themselves unstintingly to others and contributed a happy sparkle in their home at Westminster in their laughter and scholarship."

Carpenter retired to Richmond, Surrey. He has four children, David, Michael, Paul and Louise.

Carpenter wrote Common Sense About Christian Ethics as part of the Common Sense series.

He was the first chairman of the Week of Prayer for World Peace, a global interfaith initiative created by the Anglican Pacifist Fellowship.

In 2017, Michael De-la-Noy published a biography of Carpenter, A Liberal and Godly Dean: The Life of Edward Carpenter (Gloriette Publications).

== Animal welfare ==
Carpenter was a vice-president of the RSPCA and president of the Anglican Society for the Welfare of Animals.

== Selected publications ==
- Common Sense About Christian Ethics (1964)
- Cantuar: The Archbishops in their Office (1971)
- Animals and Ethics (1981)

Church of England titles
Preceded by Eric Abbott	Dean of Westminster; 1974–1985	Succeeded by Michael Mayne
Non-profit organization positions
Preceded by Leonard Wilson	President of the Modern Churchpeople's Union; 1966 – c. 1990	Succeeded by Peter Selby
