= Herbert Edward Ryle =

English Anglican bishop and biblical scholar (1856–1925)

The Right Reverend Herbert Ryle KCVO FBA
- Dean of Westminster
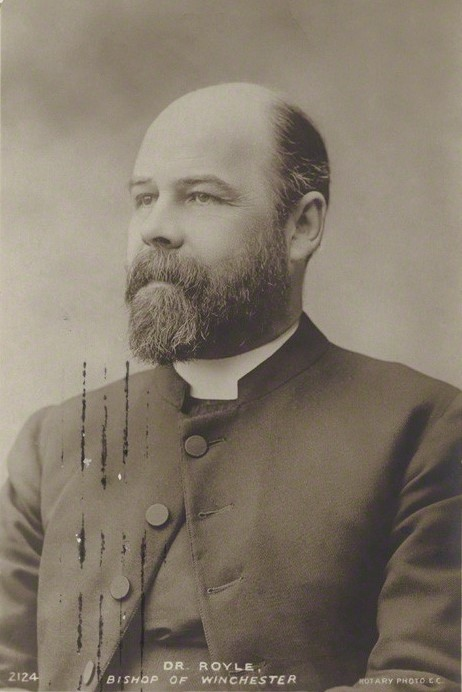
- In office: 1911–1925 (death)
- Predecessor: Armitage Robinson
- Successor: William Foxley Norris
- Other posts: Bishop of Exeter (1900–1903); Bishop of Winchester (1903–1911)

Personal details
- Born: 25 May 1856 South Kensington, London, England
- Died: 20 August 1925 (aged 69) Westminster, England
- Buried: Westminster Abbey
- Denomination: Anglican
- Parents: J. C. Ryle
- Spouse: Nea Hewish Adams (m. 1883)
- Education: King's College, Cambridge

Herbert Edward Ryle KCVO FBA (25 May 1856 – 20 August 1925) was an English Old Testament scholar and Anglican bishop, successively serving as the Bishop of Exeter, the Bishop of Winchester and the Dean of Westminster.

== Early life ==
Ryle was born in Onslow Square, South Kensington, London, on 25 May 1856, the second son of John Charles Ryle (1816–1900), the first Bishop of Liverpool, and his second wife, Jessie Elizabeth Walker. Herbert Ryle was three years old when his mother died, and in 1861 his father married Henrietta Clowes, who was a loving mother to her stepchildren. Ryle and his brothers and sisters were brought up in their father's country parishes in Suffolk, first at Helmingham and after 1861 at Stradbroke.

After attending school at Hill House, in Wadhurst, Sussex, Ryle went to Eton College in 1868. In 1875, he won the Newcastle scholarship, and in the same year he proceeded to King's College, Cambridge, as a classical scholar. A football accident in 1877 prevented him from further involvement in athletics and he took an Aegrotat degree in 1879. Between 1879 and 1881, however, he won every distinction open at Cambridge to students of theology, including a first class in the theological tripos.

== Career ==
Ryle was elected a Fellow of King's College, Cambridge, in April 1881, and began a career of twenty years as a teacher. He was ordained deacon in 1882 and priest in 1883. On 15 August 1883 he married Nea Hewish Adams, daughter of Major-General G. H. Adams. They had three sons, the eldest of whom died at birth. The youngest, aged only eight, died in 1897.

From September 1886 to March 1888 Ryle was Principal of St David's College, Lampeter, from when until 1901 he taught at the University of Cambridge as Hulsean Professor of Divinity. During these years Ryle published a number of books connected with his academic interests, including The Early Narratives of Genesis (1892), The Canon of the Old Testament (1892), and Philo and Holy Scripture (1895). After his election as President of Queens' College, Cambridge in 1896 Ryle found little time for writing. He was, however, responsible for the edition of Genesis in the Cambridge Bible (1914), when he was Dean of Westminster.

Ryle was appointed Honorary Chaplain to Queen Victoria in March 1896, and in December 1898 a Chaplain-in Ordinary to Her Majesty, from which post he resigned in early January 1901.

In December 1900 Ryle was appointed Bishop of Exeter, being consecrated at Westminster Abbey in January 1901. In early October 1902 he was among the principal guests at the 75th anniversary of St. David's College in Lampeter, Wales, where he had been a Principal 15 years earlier. He was nominated Bishop of Winchester in February 1903, and consecrated later that spring. In 1909 he was chairman of the commission sent to Sweden by the Archbishop of Canterbury to investigate the possibility of closer relations between the English and Swedish churches.

== Dean of Westminster ==
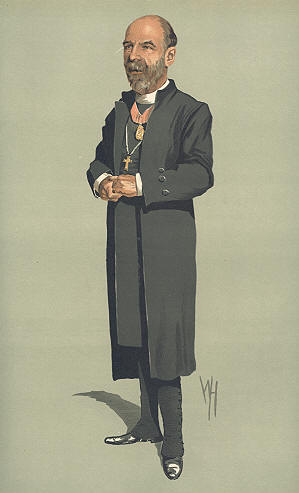
Ryle in Vanity Fair in 1912

In December 1910 Ryle was appointed Dean of Westminster. He was installed in Westminster Abbey in April 1911, at a time when the building was being prepared for the coronation of King George V. He was created CVO in 1911. Under his guidance and with the help of his advisers, the dignity of the abbey services was notably increased, and his work was commemorated by the Dean Ryle Fund, a sum of £170,000 raised for the maintenance of the abbey in response to an appeal issued by him in 1920.

During World War I Ryle used to take the midday service of intercession personally, and he was responsible for the many special services held in wartime.

The idea of a Tomb of The Unknown Warrior was first conceived in 1916 by David Railton, who, while serving as an army chaplain on the Western Front, had seen a grave marked by a rough cross, which bore the pencil-written legend 'An Unknown British Soldier'. He wrote to Ryle in 1920 proposing that an unidentified British soldier from the battlefields in France be buried with due ceremony in Westminster Abbey "amongst the kings" to represent the many hundreds of thousands of Empire dead. The idea was strongly supported by Ryle and the then Prime Minister David Lloyd George. There was initial opposition from King George V (who feared that such a ceremony would reopen the wounds of a recently concluded war) and others but a surge of emotional support from the great number of bereaved families ensured its adoption. The inscription on the tomb was composed by Ryle.

Ryle withheld permission for the remains of Lord Byron to be interred in the abbey on the grounds that he considered Byron to be an inappropriate person for such an honour.

Ryle was created a Knight Commander of the Royal Victorian Order in 1921. He was dean at the wedding of Prince Albert, Duke of York, and Lady Elizabeth Bowes-Lyon.

He had never been strong and had a history of heart trouble. In the autumn of 1924 his health broke down. After five months in a nursing home at Bournemouth he returned in May 1925 to the deanery, where he died on 20 August. He was buried on 25 August in Westminster Abbey in a spot close to the tomb of The Unknown Warrior. His wife survived him.

Dean Ryle Street in Westminster is named after him.

== Publications ==
- On the Church of England, Macmillan and Co. 1904
- Psalms of the Pharisees, commonly called the Psalms of Solomon, Cambridge University Press 1891
- The Canon of the Old Testament, Macmillan and Co. 1892
- Philo and Holy Scripture, Macmillan and Co. 1893
- On Holy Scripture and Criticism, Macmillan and Co. 1904
- The Books of Ezra and Nehemiah, Oxford University Press 1911
- The Early Narratives of Genesis, Macmillan and Co. 1900
- Remember the Days of Old, Oxford University Press 1913
- Biblical Commentary on the Prophecies of Isaiah

Church of England titles
Preceded by Edward Bickersteth	Bishop of Exeter; 1900–1903	Succeeded by Archibald Robertson
Preceded by Randall Davidson	Bishop of Winchester; 1903–1911	Succeeded by Edward Talbot
Preceded by Armitage Robinson	Dean of Westminster; 1911–1925	Succeeded by William Foxley Norris
Academic offices
Preceded by Francis Jayne	Principal of St David's College; 1886	Succeeded by Charles Edmondes
Preceded by F. J. A. Hort	Hulsean Professor of Divinity; 1887–1901	Succeeded by William Emery Barnes
Preceded by William Campion	President of Queens' College, Cambridge; 1896–1901	Succeeded by Frederic Chase
