= Armitage Robinson =

English priest and scholar (1858–1933)

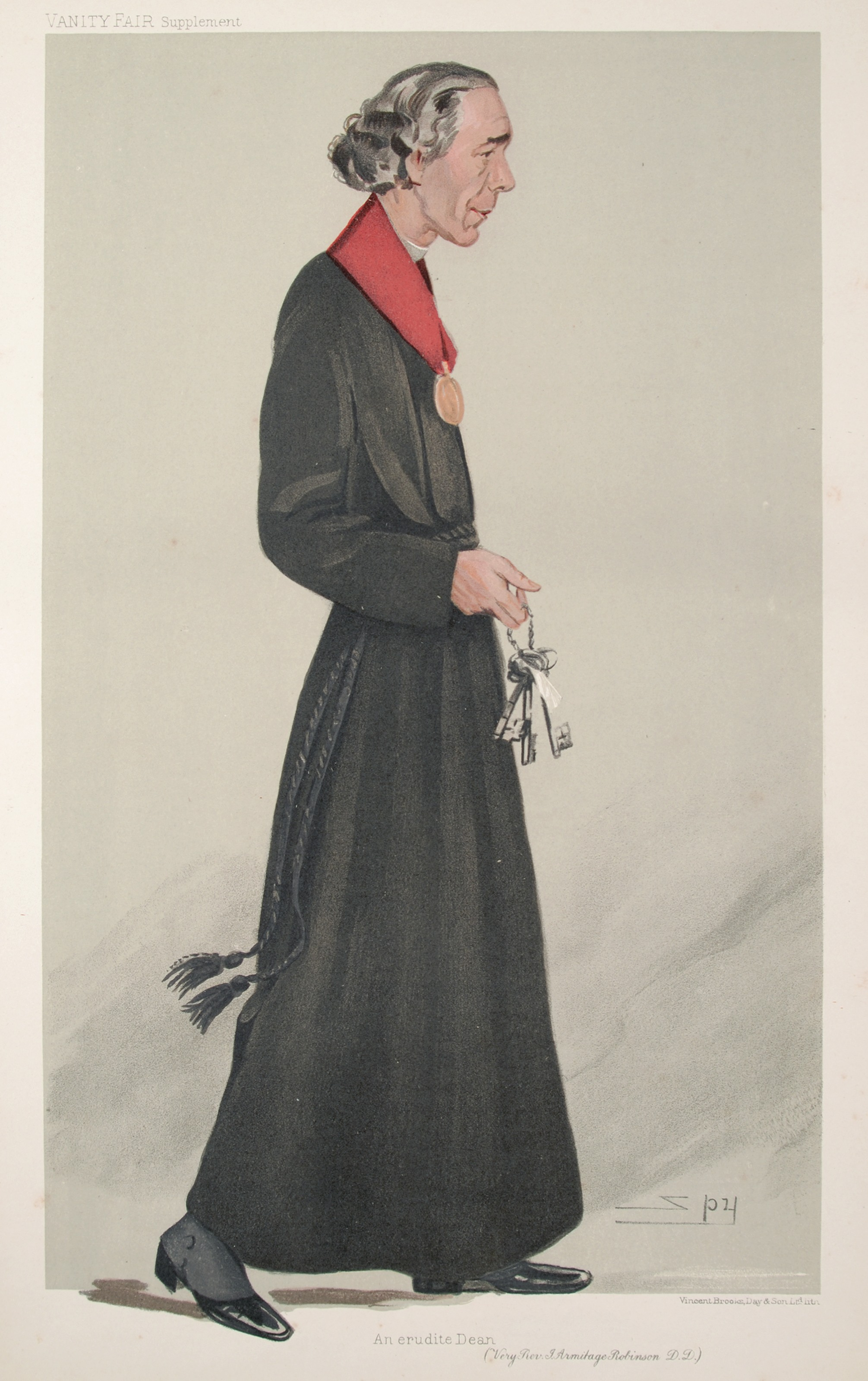
"An erudite Dean" As depicted by "Spy" (Leslie Ward) in Vanity Fair, December 1905

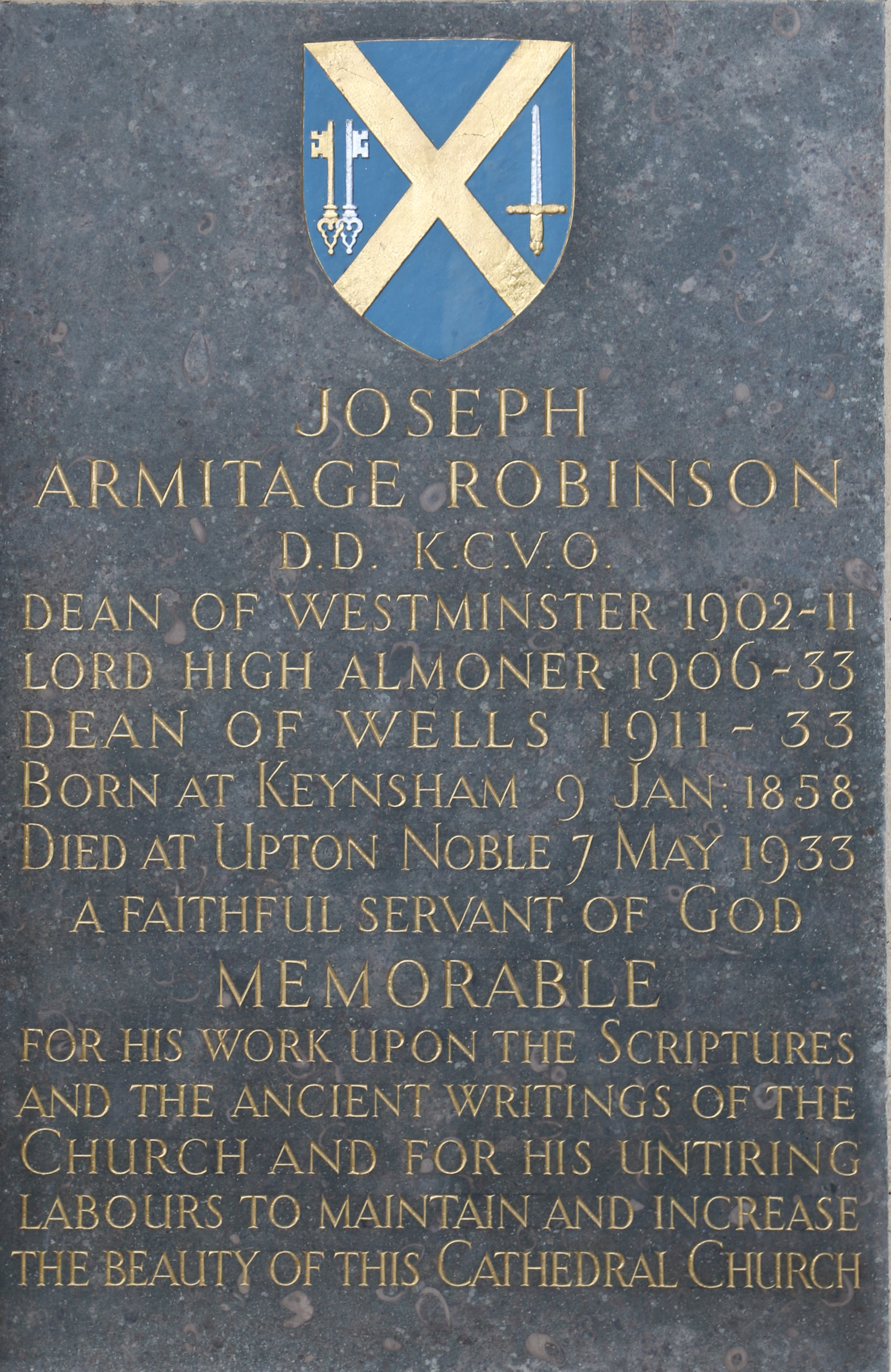
Memorial in Wells Cathedral

Joseph Armitage Robinson KCVO FBA (9 January 1858 – 7 May 1933) was a priest in the Church of England and scholar. He was successively Dean of Westminster (1902–1911) and of Wells (1911–1933).

== Biography ==
Robinson was born the son of a poor vicar in Keynsham, and was educated at Liverpool College and Christ's College, Cambridge, of which he became a fellow. He was ordained deacon in the Diocese of Ely in 1881, and priest in 1882, when he was Fellow. After a BA degree in 1881, he received his MA degree in 1884, was made Bachelor of Divinity (BD) in 1891, and Doctor of Divinity (DD) in 1896.

His first ecclesiastical posting was a domestic chaplain to Joseph Lightfoot, Bishop of Durham from 1883 to 1884, following which he was curate of Great St. Mary, Cambridge until 1886, then a Cambridge Whitehall preacher from 1886 to 1888. That year he was appointed examining chaplain to the Bishop of Bath and Wells and vicar of All Saints' Church, Cambridge where he stayed from 1888 until 1892. He was also a dean of Christ's College, Cambridge, from 1884 to 1890. In 1893 he was appointed Norrisian professor of Divinity at Cambridge University, serving as such until 1899, during which he was also a prebendary of Wells Cathedral. He served as rector of St Margaret's, Westminster 1899–1900, and was appointed a canon of Westminster in 1899, serving until his appointment as dean.

In January 1902 he was appointed a Chaplain-in-Ordinary to King Edward VII. The Dean of Westminster, George Granville Bradley, was severely ill throughout most of 1902, but wanted to stay in the position until the coronation of the King in August. Bradley resigned the following month, and the King appointed Robinson Dean of Westminster in early October, followed by a formal installation in Westminster Abbey on 28 October 1902. As Dean of Westminster, he was in November 1902 appointed Acting Chaplain to the Queen's Westminsters, the largest volunteer corps in London.

Robinson was Lord High Almoner from 1906 to 1933.

He served at Westminster until he was appointed Dean of Wells in 1911. It has been suggested that the move to Wells was arranged to avoid friction in the run-up to the coronation of George V.

As Dean of Wells Robinson enjoyed close links with Downside Abbey. He also critically explored the origins of the Glastonbury legends to which the Glastonbury Festival had revived attention. A renowned scholar in patristics (he was particularly known for his work on the Lausiac History and for having been the first person to translate into English the newly discovered work by Irenaeus The Demonstration of the Apostolic Preaching), Armitage Robinson was a participant in the bilateral Anglican-Roman Catholic Malines Conversations.

He held honorary doctorates from Göttingen (Hon Ph.D., 1893) and Halle (Hon. D.Theol., 1894).

He was appointed Knight Commander of the Royal Victorian Order (KCVO) in 1932, and died at Upton Noble, Somerset, on 7 May 1933 aged 75.

== Works ==
- Encyclopaedia Biblica (contributor), 1903.
- St. Paul's Epistle to the Ephesians, A revised text and translation with exposition and notes London 1903, Second Edition 1904.
- The Lausiac History of Palladius (Texts and Studies, vol. vi), Cambridge 1904.
- (with Cuthbert Butler) The Lausiac History of Palladius, 1918.
- The Demonstration of the Apostolic Preaching (translated from the Armenian with introduction and notes), 1920
- The Saxon Bishops of Wells, London, 1919.
- Somerset Historical Essays, Oxford,1921.
- The Times of St. Dunstan, Oxford, 1923.
- Two Glastonbury Legends: King Arthur and Joseph of Arimathaea, Cambridge 1926. Reprinted in 2010 by Kessinger Publishing, LLC. ISBN 978-1-169-68948-0

Religious titles
Preceded by George Granville Bradley	Dean of Westminster; 1902–1911	Succeeded by Herbert Edward Ryle
Preceded by Thomas Jex-Blake	Dean of Wells; 1911–1933	Succeeded by Richard Malden
