= Paul de Labilliere =

British bishop (1879–1946)

- Dean of Westminster
- In office: 1938 – 1946 (d.)
- Predecessor: William Foxley Norris
- Successor: Alan Don
- Other posts: Bishop of Knaresborough and Archdeacon of Leeds (1934–1938)

Orders
- Ordination: 1902 (deacon); 1903 (priest) by Francis Chavasse (Liverpool)
- Consecration: 1934 by William Temple (York)

Personal details
- Born: 22 January 1879
- Died: 28 April 1946 (aged 67) Westminster Hospital, City of Westminster, UK
- Denomination: Anglican
- Spouse: Ester Morkel
- Children: two
- Education: Merton College, Oxford

Paul Fulcrand Delacour De Labillière (22 January 1879 – 28 April 1946) was the second Bishop of Knaresborough from 1934 to 1937; and, subsequently, Dean of Westminster.

== Career ==
Born on 22 January 1879 into a legal family (his father was a barrister of the Middle Temple) he was educated at Harrow and Merton College, Oxford (where he was later elected an Honorary Fellow, in 1945). He was made deacon in Advent 1902 (21 December) at the Pro-Cathedral, and ordained priest the following Advent (20 December 1903) at Edge Hill Parish Church (i.e. St Mary's) — both times by Francis Chavasse, Bishop of Liverpool.

After ordination in 1903, he served as a curate in Liverpool and Plymouth before his appointment as Chaplain to the Bishop of Durham and then undertook missionary work in South Africa. In South Africa he met and married Ester Morkel; they had a son and a daughter. The daughter, Doreen, married (1937) Tom Dunbabin, the archaeologist and Cretan resistance fighter.

He was successively Clerical Superintendent of the Liverpool Scripture Readers, Chaplain of Wadham College, Oxford, Lecturer at Wycliffe Hall, Oxford and Vicar of Christ Church, High Harrogate before a 4-year stint as Suffragan Bishop of Knaresborough and Archdeacon of Leeds. He was consecrated a bishop on St James's Day 1934 (25 July), by William Temple, Archbishop of York, at York Minster. He served as Bishop of Knaresborough until his installation as Dean of Westminster on Candlemas 1938 (2 February).

A quiet but effective priest, his final professional appointment was as Dean of Westminster. De Labillière had profound experiences of both World Wars. In the Great War he earned a Mention in Despatches when he served as a chaplain from 1916 to 1919, from December 1917 in Egypt. In the Second World War, when he was Dean of Westminster, a German bomb in 1941 destroyed part of the Abbey and the Deanery. George VI’s Private Secretary, Tommy Lascelles, noted in his diary for 24 November 1942, ‘The Dean of Westminster lunched with me .... I like him, and have always admired him for his unruffled fortitude the day after the Germans blew his beautiful deanery and all his possessions into dust and ashes during one of the worst Blitz-nights. De Labillière was sufficiently well-regarded to be a candidate for Archbishop of Canterbury when Cosmo Lang retired in 1942. De Labillière was recognised as a scholar and preacher but ‘lacks weight’; William Temple was appointed.

De Labilliere is also remembered for a last-minute change in the Abbey's Armistice Day service in 1938 after Kristallnacht when he included a prayer for the Jewish people 'in their trouble.'

The Deanery was destroyed in the 1941 Blitz and it is said the King and Queen offered him alternative accommodation at Buckingham Palace but he found a new place to live close to the Abbey.

As Dean of Westminster, De Labillière was also ex officio Dean of the Order of the Bath; he died in post of a brain haemorrhage on 28 April 1946.

Church of England titles
| Preceded by Lucius Smith | Bishop of Knaresborough; 1934–1938 | Succeeded by John Bateman-Champain |
| Preceded by William Foxley Norris | Dean of Westminster; 1938–1946 | Succeeded by Alan Don |
