= Michael Mayne =

English priest

The Very Reverend Michael Mayne KCVO
- Dean of Westminster
- Church: Church of England
- In office: 1986 to 1996
- Predecessor: Edward Carpenter
- Successor: Wesley Carr
- Other post: Vicar of Church of St Mary the Great, Cambridge (1979–1986)

Orders
- Ordination: 1957

Personal details
- Born: 10 September 1929 Harlestone, Northamptonshire, England
- Died: 22 October 2006 (aged 77)
- Denomination: Anglicanism
- Education: The King's School, Canterbury
- Alma mater: Corpus Christi College, Cambridge; Cuddesdon Theological College

Michael Clement Otway Mayne, KCVO (10 September 1929 – 22 October 2006) was an English priest of the Church of England who served as the Dean of Westminster.

== Early life ==
Michael Clement Otway Mayne was born at Harlestone, Northamptonshire, the son of Rev. Michael Ashton Otway Mayne, rector of that parish, and his wife Sylvia Clementia Lumley Ellis. His father committed suicide by jumping from the top of Harlestone church tower when Mayne was three years old, after which his mother moved the family to Torbay and then London. With the support of clerical charities, Mayne was educated at The King's School, Canterbury and later at Corpus Christi College, Cambridge and Cuddesdon Theological College, Oxford. His early passion for acting and drama flourished while at university, though his former headmaster encouraged him to take up the priesthood.

== Ecclesiastical career and later life ==
Mayne served his curacy at St John's Harpenden (1957–1959) and then spent six years as chaplain to Mervyn Stockwood, Bishop of Southwark (1959–1965). In 1965, newly married, he became vicar of the Parish of Norton, Letchworth Garden City, where he carried out an effective ministry for the next seven years.

In 1972 Mayne was made the head of religious programmes for BBC Radio a difficult post expounding Christian faith in a largely secular organisation and arguably made more difficult by Mayne's lack of relevant broadcasting experience. However at the time of his death it was remembered that "he brought to religious broadcasting, if not much in the way of innovation or combative empire-building, yet a great deal in terms of stylistic enrichment and quality. He was.....an artist rather than an administrator, a performer rather than an initiator; but he enjoyed very wide respect in his department and outside, with a wit and a humanity which endeared him (despite an occasional grandeur of manner) to his many friends."

After a seven-year stint in the BBC he became the vicar of Great St. Mary's, the university church of Cambridge in 1979.

In 1986 he was invited by Queen Elizabeth II to become Dean of Westminster Abbey, a position he held until 1996. As dean, he officiated at the wedding of Prince Andrew and Sarah Ferguson on 23 July 1986. He initiated great changes in the liturgical and prayer life of the Abbey making the Sunday Eucharist the heart and highpoint of the Sunday celebrations at the Abbey. In addition, he "persuaded his colleagues and some other devout souls to assemble in St Faith's Chapel at 7 am every day for 40 minutes of silent prayer before the regular morning services."

During his tenure he selected various people to be commemorated in the abbey, including Oscar Wilde, Alexander Pope, Edward Lear, Robert Herrick and Matthew Arnold. On his retirement in 1996 he was made Dean Emeritus of Westminster and also received his KCVO.

During his 50s Mayne was diagnosed with ME and wrote a book about his experiences living with the syndrome (A Year Lost and Found). In 2005 he was diagnosed with terminal cancer of the jaw, and this led him to write a book about his battle with cancer (The Enduring Melody).

== Books ==
- A Year Lost and Found ISBN 0-232-51747-9
- This Sunrise of Wonder: A Quest for God In Art and Nature ISBN 0-00-627870-1
- Pray, Love, Remember ISBN 0-232-52270-7
- The Enduring Melody ISBN 0-232-52687-7
- Learning to Dance ISBN 0-232-5243-43
