= Robert Grimley =

The Very Reverend Robert Grimley
- Dean of Bristol
- Church: Church of England
- In office: 1997–2009
- Predecessor: Wesley Carr
- Successor: David Hoyle

Orders
- Ordination: 1968 (deacon); 1969 (priest)

Personal details
- Born: Robert William Grimley; 26 September 1943 (age 82) Derby, Derbyshire, England
- Denomination: Anglicanism
- Residence: Oxford, Oxfordshire

Robert William Grimley (born 26 September 1943) is a Church of England priest. He was Dean of Bristol from 1997 to 2009.

== Early life ==
Grimley was born on 26 September 1943 in Derby, England, the son of William Bracebridge Grimley and Gladys Mary née Draper.

After schooling at Derby School, an all-boys grammar school in Derby, Grimley matriculated in Christ's College, Cambridge; there, he studied Part I of the Mathematical Tripos before switching to theology for Part II. He graduated from the University of Cambridge with a Bachelor of Arts (BA) degree in 1966; his BA was promoted a Master of Arts (MA Cantab) degree in 1970. In 1966, he entered Ripon Hall, Oxford, an Anglican theological college. While training for ordination, he also studied Oriental studies (specifically Hebrew, Aramaic and Syriac) at Wadham College, Oxford. He graduated from the University of Oxford with a BA degree in 1968; this was promoted to an MA (Oxon) degree in 1976.

== Ordained ministry ==
Grimley was ordained in the Church of England as a deacon in 1968 and as a priest in 1969. His first post was as an Assistant Curate at St John, Radlett (1968–72); he then served as curate of St Mary's Church Moseley, Moseley, until 1974, when he was Vicar of St. George's Church, Edgbaston (1984–97). He was Dean of Bristol from 1997 to 2009.

He retired from full-time ministry in 2009. In 2010, he was granted permission to officiate in the Diocese of Oxford. Since 2010, he has served as an honorary chaplain at Christ Church Cathedral, Oxford.

== Honours ==
On 3 December 2004, Grimley was awarded the honorary degree of Doctor of Letters (Hon DLitt) by the University of the West of England. On 15 July 2009, he was awarded the honorary degree of Doctor of Laws (Hon LLD) by the University of Bristol.

== Personal life ==
Grimley married Joan Elizabeth Platt in 1968. They have had two sons and one daughter. One of their sons, Matthew, is now a Fellow and Mark Reynolds Tutor in History at Merton College, Oxford, where he specialises in the history of twentieth-century Britain with a focus on public morality after World War II, and religious and national identity after World War I.

Church of England titles
Preceded by Arthur Wesley Carr	Deans of Bristol; 1997–2009	Succeeded by David Michael Hoyle
