= Ellen Clark-King =

British-Canadian Anglican priest and academic

The Reverend Ellen Clark-King
- Dean of King's College London
- Church: Church of England
- In office: 2020 to present
- Predecessor: Richard Burridge

Orders
- Ordination: 1992 (deacon); 1994 (priest)

Personal details
- Born: Ellen Jane Clark; 1962 (age 63–64)
- Education: Newnham College, Cambridge; Ripon College Cuddesdon; University of London; Lancaster University

Ellen Jane Clark-King (née Clark; born 1962) is a British-Canadian Anglican priest and academic. Since 2020, she has served as Dean of King's College London.

== Early life and education ==
Ellen Jane Clark was born in 1962. From 1982 to 1985, she studied history at Newnham College, Cambridge, graduating with a Bachelor of Arts (BA) degree: as per tradition, her BA was promoted to a Master of Arts (MA Cantab) degree. From 1989 to 1992, she trained for ordination and studied theology at Ripon College Cuddesdon. She continued her studies in Christian spirituality at the University of London, graduating with a Master of Arts (MA) degree in 1999. She then studied for a Doctor of Philosophy (PhD) degree at Lancaster University, which she completed in 2003 with a doctoral thesis titled "Sacred hearts: feminist theology interrogated by the voices of working-class women".

== Ordained ministry and career ==
Clark-King was made a deacon in the Church of England in 1992. Following the vote to allow women to be ordained as priests in the Church of England, she was ordained to the priesthood in 1994 during a service at Hereford Cathedral. She served her curacy in a multi-church parish in the Diocese of Hereford from 1992 to 1995. Then, from 1995 to 2000, she was fellow and chaplain of Sidney Sussex College, Cambridge. In 2000, she moved to the Diocese of Newcastle, where she became a doctoral student and non-stipendiary minister. She was additionally assistant diocesan director of ordinands from 2001 to 2005.

In 2005, Clark-King left the United Kingdom for the Anglican Church of Canada: she was looking for an inclusive church that was welcoming of LGBTQ clergy and accepted same-sex marriage. She served as associate pastor of Christ Church Cathedral, Vancouver between 2005 and 2012. She was additionally Archdeacon of Burrard from 2007 to 2014. From 2012 to 2014 and from 2015 to 2016, she was cathedral vicar of Christ Church Cathedral, Vancouver. For the 2014/15 academic year, she was director for Anglican formation at the Vancouver School of Theology. She was also an elected member of the General Synod of the Anglican Church of Canada. She took Canadian citizenship during her time in the country.

In December 2016, she moved to the United States, where she became executive pastor and canon for social justice at Grace Cathedral, San Francisco in the Episcopal Diocese of California. She was promoted to vice-dean in September 2019. She was an elected member of the General Convention of the Episcopal Church in the United States of America.

Having returned to the United Kingdom, she has been Dean of King's College London since December 2020: this is the most senior cleric of the university, and is tasked with overseeing the spiritual development and welfare of all its students and staff. She is the first woman to hold the post in the almost two centuries of the college's existence. She has additionally been a non-stipendiary minister at St Anne's Church, Soho in the Diocese of London since 2021, and a public preacher in the Diocese of Southwark since 2022.

== Personal life ==
She is married to Jeremy Clark-King, a fellow Anglican priest. Jonathan Clark, an Anglican bishop, is her brother.

== Selected works ==
- Clark-King, Ellen (2004). Theology by heart: women, the Church and God. Peterborough: Epworth Press. ISBN 978-0716205876.
- Clark-King, Ellen (2011). Path to Your Door: Approaches to Christian Spirituality. London: Continuum International Publisher. ISBN 978-1441157638.
