= John Hall (priest) =

Dean of Westminster and a chaplain to Queen Elizabeth II

The Very Reverend John Hall KCVO CStJ FSA FRSA
- Dean of Westminster
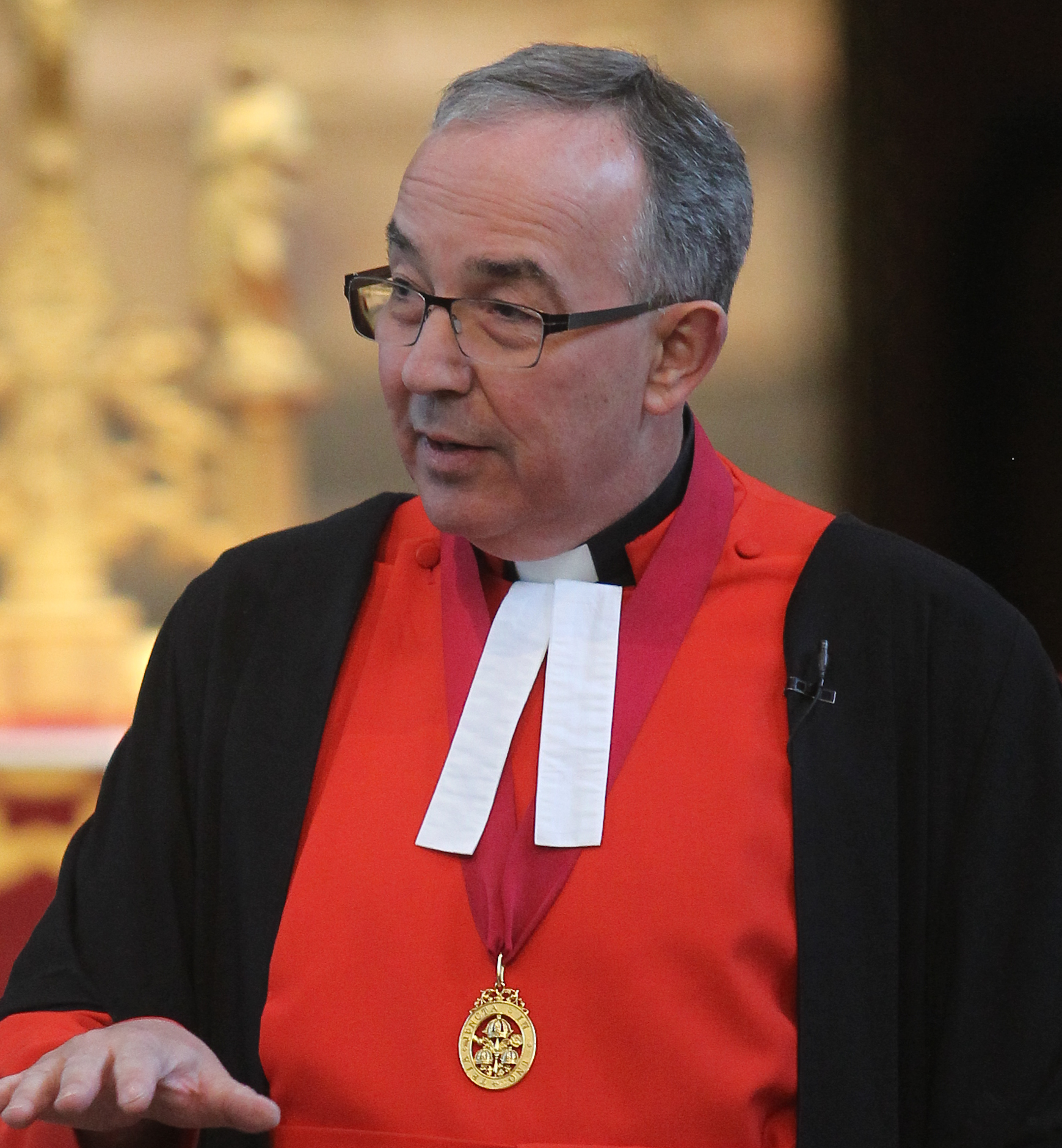
- Hall in 2015
- Church: Church of England
- Diocese: Royal Peculiar
- In office: December 2006 – 1 November 2019
- Predecessor: Wesley Carr
- Successor: David Hoyle

Orders
- Ordination: 1975 (deacon); 1976 (priest)

Personal details
- Born: 13 March 1949 (age 77)
- Denomination: Anglicanism
- Education: St Chad's College, Durham (BA); Cuddesdon Theological College
- Hall's voice recorded 2012, as part of an audio description for VocalEyes

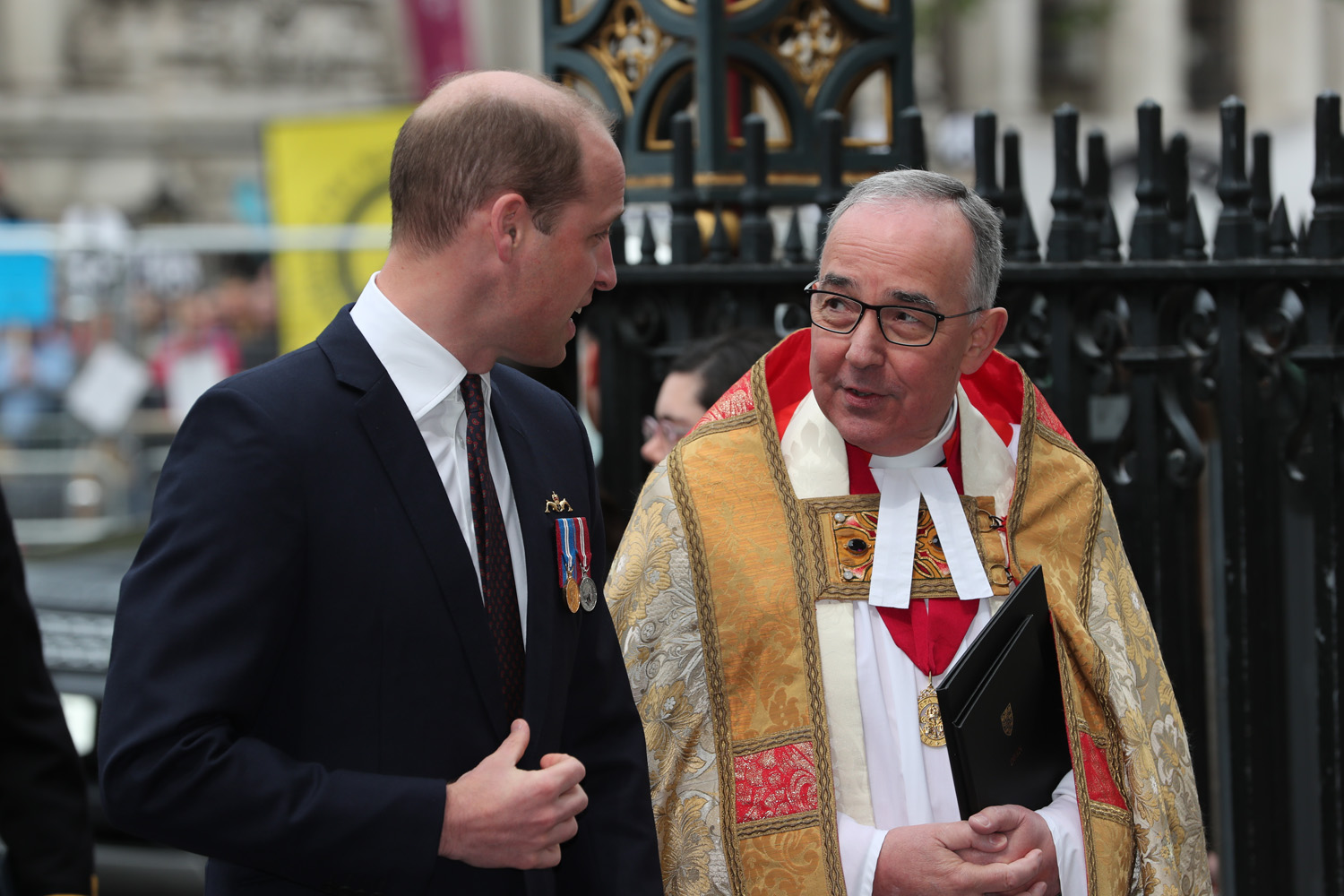
Hall with Prince William, Duke of Cambridge at Westminster Abbey

John Robert Hall (born 13 March 1949) is an English retired priest of the Church of England. He was the Dean of Westminster and a chaplain to Queen Elizabeth II.

== Early life and education ==
His parents were Ronald John Hall and Katie Margaret Brock Walker. He was educated at St Dunstan's College, Catford and St Chad's College, University of Durham (BA). Following two years as a teacher he studied for ordination at Cuddesdon Theological College, Oxford.

== Ministry ==
Hall served as assistant curate at St John the Divine's Church in Kennington from 1975 to 1978 and was then priest-in-charge of All Saints' Wimbledon from 1978 to 1984.

From 1984 to 1992, Hall was vicar of St Peter's Streatham. He became Diocesan Director of Education in the Diocese of Blackburn in 1992 (and a canon residentiary of Blackburn Cathedral in 1994). From 1998 to 2006 he was general secretary of the National Society for Promoting Religious Education and from 1998 to 2002 the general secretary of the Church of England Board of Education, subsequently Chief Education Officer of the Church of England from 2002 to 2006. He also served as an honorary curate of St Alban's South Norwood from 2003 to 2006.

At various times Hall has been a governor of 10 schools and two universities, a member of two local authority education committees and of the General Teaching Council for England. He has written widely and debated publicly on educational matters and was instrumental in the production of the Dearing Report in 2001 and its follow-up, which led to a significant expansion in the number of Church of England secondary schools. As Dean of Westminster he chaired the governors of Westminster School and Westminster Abbey Choir School.

He was installed by Roehampton University as pro-chancellor of the university in March 2011.

Hall's appointment as Dean of Westminster was announced in November 2006 and he assumed office in December 2006. On 29 April 2011 he officiated at the wedding of Prince William of Wales and Catherine Middleton. On 28 September 2018, Hall's retirement was announced for 1 November 2019.

== Honours ==
Hall was elected a Fellow of the Society of Antiquaries (FSA) in 2014, and was previously elected a Fellow of the Royal Society of Arts. He was appointed an honorary fellow of Canterbury Christ Church University in November 2007. In February 2009, he was appointed an honorary fellow of St Chad's College, Durham University and, in May 2009, an honorary fellow of the College of Teachers.

In July 2007, Hall was awarded an honorary Doctor of Divinity (DD) degree by Roehampton University. He received the honorary degree of Doctor of Theology (Hon DTheol) from the University of Chester in March 2008.

On 30 October 2019, Hall was appointed Knight Commander of the Royal Victorian Order (KCVO) for service to the Monarch. He was appointed a Commander of the Order of St John on 24 August 2020.

== Styles ==
- The Reverend John Hall (1975–1992; 2019–present)
- The Reverend Canon John Hall (1992–2006)
- The Very Reverend John Hall (2006–2019)
- The Very Reverend John Hall, KCVO (2019-)

== Bibliography ==
- Lankshear, David W.; Hall, John R. (2003). Governing and Managing Church Schools (2nd ed.). London: Church House. ISBN 071514992X.
- Hall, John (2012). Queen Elizabeth II and Her Church: Royal Service at Westminster Abbey. London: Continuum. ISBN 9781441120724.
