= David Hoyle (priest) =

British Anglican priest and academic (born 1957)

The Very Reverend David Hoyle KCVO MBE
- Dean of Westminster
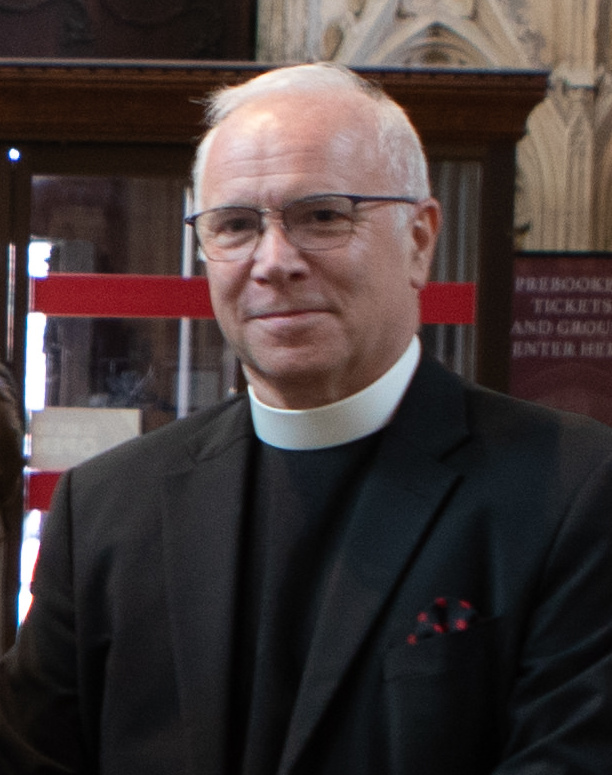
- Hoyle in 2024
- Church: Church of England
- Diocese: Royal Peculiar
- Appointed: 19 June 2019
- In office: 16 November 2019
- Predecessor: John Hall
- Previous post: Dean of Bristol (2010–2019)

Orders
- Ordination: 1986 (deacon); 1987 (priest)

Personal details
- Born: David Michael Hoyle; 1957 (age 68–69) Waterfoot, Lancashire, England
- Denomination: Anglicanism
- Education: Corpus Christi College, Cambridge; Ripon College, Cuddesdon; Magdalene College, Cambridge

David Michael Hoyle KCVO MBE (born 1957) is a British Anglican priest and academic who was appointed the 39th dean of Westminster in 2019, having previously served as dean of Bristol from 2010 to 2019.

== Early life and education ==
Hoyle was born in 1957 in Waterfoot, Lancashire, England, the son of Michael and Yvonne Hoyle. He was educated at Watford Grammar School for Boys, then an all-boys state grammar school in Watford, Hertfordshire. He studied history and theology at Corpus Christi College, Cambridge, graduating with a Bachelor of Arts (BA) degree in 1980: as per tradition, his BA was promoted to a Master of Arts (MA Cantab) degree in 1983. From 1984 to 1986, he trained for ordination at Ripon College, Cuddesdon. He continued his studies at Magdalene College, Cambridge, completing his Doctor of Philosophy (PhD) degree in 1991. His doctoral thesis was titled "Near popery yet no popery: theological debate in Cambridge 1590-1644".

== Ordained ministry ==
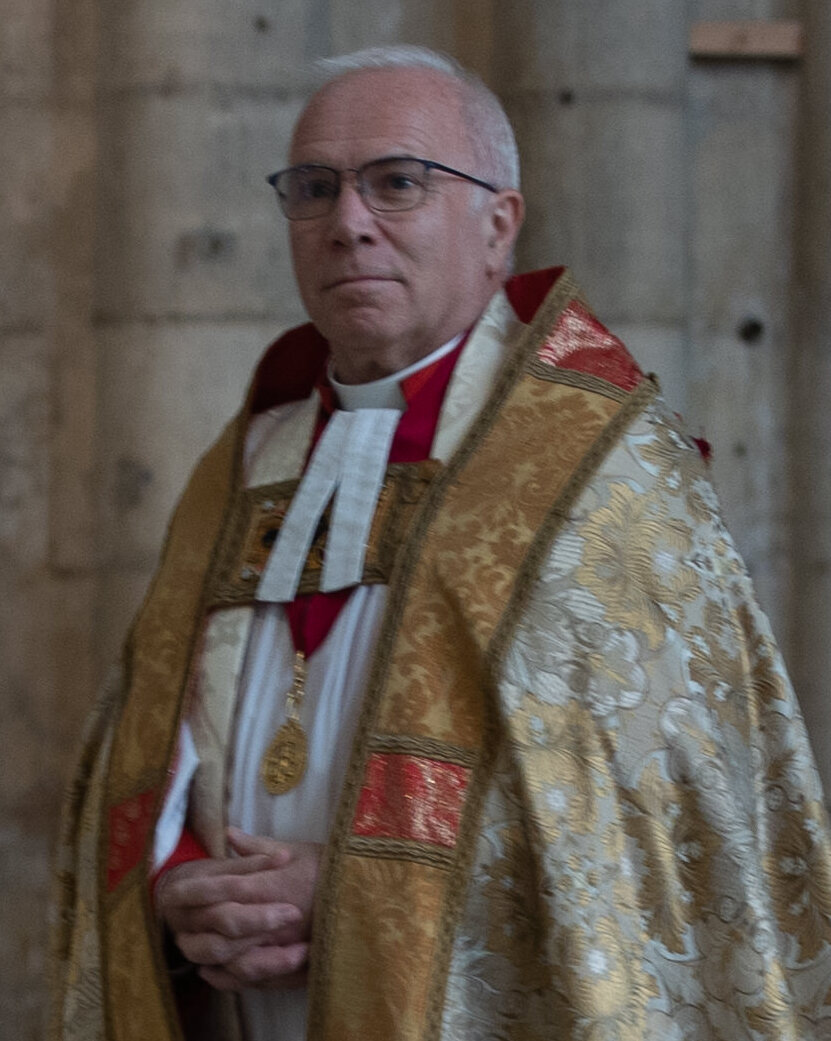
Hoyle in 2024

Hoyle was ordained in the Church of England as a deacon in 1986 and as a priest in 1987. His first post was as curate of the Church of the Good Shepherd in Chesterton, Cambridge, after which he was a Fellow and chaplain (later Dean) of Magdalene College, Cambridge. He was vicar of Christ Church in Southgate, London, and then Director of Ministry for the Diocese of Gloucester and residentiary canon of Gloucester Cathedral until his appointment as Dean of Bristol in 2010.

He was installed as Dean of Bristol on 29 May 2010. On 19 June 2019, it was announced that he had been appointed Dean of Westminster, and he took up his appointment on 16 November 2019 following the retirement of John Hall. Four months later, Westminster Abbey was obliged to close its doors due to the COVID-19 pandemic, dealing what Hoyle described as a "shattering blow" to its finances, given that 90% of its income came from visitors' entrance fees.

Hoyle conducted the State Funeral of Queen Elizabeth II on 19 September 2022 at Westminster Abbey following the rubric of the 1662 Book of Common Prayer. At the beginning of the service Hoyle gave the bidding and then the blessing at the end. He also took part in the coronation of Charles III and Camilla in 2023.

== Honours ==
Hoyle was appointed Member of the Order of the British Empire (MBE) in the 2020 New Year Honours for services to faith and vulnerable communities in Bristol. He was appointed Knight Commander of the Royal Victorian Order (KCVO) in the 2024 New Year Honours for services at the coronation. As a clergyman, he was not dubbed and does not use the title sir.

Church of England titles
Preceded by Robert Grimley	Dean of Bristol; 2010 – 2019	Succeeded by Mandy Ford
Preceded by John Hall	Dean of Westminster; 2019 – present	Incumbent
