= Rose Bradley =

British writer

Rose Marian Bradley (1867 – 24 September 1948) was an English journalist and writer.

== Biography ==
On 19 June 1867, Bradley was born in Marlborough, Wiltshire. Bradley's father was George Bradley, Dean of Westminster.

Bradley contributed to the Cornhill Magazine and The Nineteenth Century. During World War I she was secretary to the Women's Legion, for which she received an O.B.E. She also helped compile the biography of Lord Chaplin.

== Works ==
- Children at Play, and other sketches, 1911
- The English Housewife in the Seventeenth and Eighteenth Centuries, 1912
