= Wesley Carr =

British priest (1941–2017)

The Very Reverend Wesley Carr KCVO
- Dean of Westminster
- Church: Church of England
- Diocese: Royal peculiar
- In office: 1997 to 2006
- Predecessor: Michael Mayne
- Successor: John Hall
- Other post: Dean of Bristol (1987–1997)

Orders
- Ordination: 1967 (deacon); 1968 (priest)

Personal details
- Born: 26 July 1941
- Died: 15 July 2017 (aged 75)
- Denomination: Anglicanism
- Education: Jesus College, Oxford; Ridley Hall, Cambridge; Jesus College, Cambridge

Arthur Wesley Carr KCVO (26 July 1941 – 15 July 2017) was an Anglican priest who was the Dean of Westminster from 1997 to 2006.

== Early life ==
Carr was born on 26 July 1941, and was educated at Dulwich College, an all-boys independent school in London. He was educated at Jesus College, Oxford, graduating with a Bachelor of Arts (BA) degree in 1964. From 1965 to 1967, he trained for ordination at Ridley Hall, Cambridge, an evangelical Anglican theological college. During this time, he also studied for a second BA at Jesus College, Cambridge, graduating in 1966.

== Ordained ministry ==
Carr was ordained in the Church of England as a deacon in 1967 and as a priest in 1968. His first appointment was as a curate at St Mary's Church, Luton (Diocese of St Albans) from 1967 to 1971. He was then a tutor (1970–1971) and a chaplain (1971–1972) at Ridley Hall, Cambridge. While at the University of Sheffield he was an honorary curate at Ranmoor (Diocese of Sheffield) from 1972 to 1974.

From 1974 to 1978, Carr was the chaplain of Chelmsford Cathedral (Diocese of Chelmsford). Until 1982 he was also deputy director of the Cathedral Centre for Research and Training. From 1978 to 1987 he was a canon residentiary of the cathedral. From 1976 to 1984 he was also Diocesan Director of Training. In 1987 Carr left Chelmsford to become Dean of Bristol.

In 1997, he moved to Westminster Abbey, where later that year he officiated at the funeral service of Diana, Princess of Wales. In 2002 he also officiated at the funeral of Queen Elizabeth The Queen Mother. In 1998, he was at the centre of a controversy over his abrupt dismissal of the abbey's Director of Music, Martin Neary, over accounting practices for professional concerts and recordings occurring outside the abbey. The matter was contested and referred to Lord Jauncey of Tullichettle for determination at the behest of Queen Elizabeth II as the Official Visitor. While Lord Jauncey's report upheld Neary's dismissal in finding him to be partially at fault, he was careful to note Neary's years of exceptional service and that his actions were not legally wrongful and did not amount to meaningful harm. The finding further criticised the dean and chapter for the manner in which Neary was dismissed, stating that their actions "must score gamma minus on the scale of natural justice" and concluding with the observation that, "had the parties been prepared to discuss openly and frankly the Abbey's concerns, to acknowledge that serious mistakes had been made and to consider the reasons therefor, it might perhaps have been possible to avoid the present unhappy situation with all its attendant publicity and to have reached a rather less dramatic resolution of their differences." The controversy led to the resignation of ex-Speaker of the Commons Bernard Weatherill as High Bailiff and Searcher of the Sanctuary of the Abbey, in protest at the manner in which Carr and the Chapter dealt with Neary's termination.

Carr was made an honorary DLitt of the University of the West of England in Bristol in 1997. On his retirement as Dean of Westminster in 2006 he was appointed a Knight Commander of the Royal Victorian Order (KCVO) on 17 February. As a priest he had the same precedence as a knight of the relevant order. Carr was the author of a number of books about aspects of the Christian faith.
