= Reginald Askew =

British Anglican priest and academician

Reginald James Albert Askew (16 May 1928 – 9 April 2012) was a British Anglican priest and academic. He was Principal of Salisbury and Wells Theological College from 1973 to 1987, and Dean of King's College London from 1988 to 1993.
