= George Granville Bradley =

English divine, scholar, and schoolteacher

The Very Reverend George Granville Bradley CVO
- Dean of Westminster
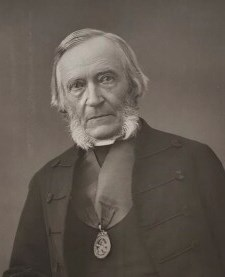
- Church: Church of England
- In office: 1881–1902
- Predecessor: Arthur Penrhyn Stanley
- Successor: Armitage Robinson

Personal details
- Born: 11 December 1821
- Died: 13 March 1903 (aged 81)
- Buried: Westminster Abbey
- Denomination: Anglicanism
- Education: Rugby School; University College, Oxford

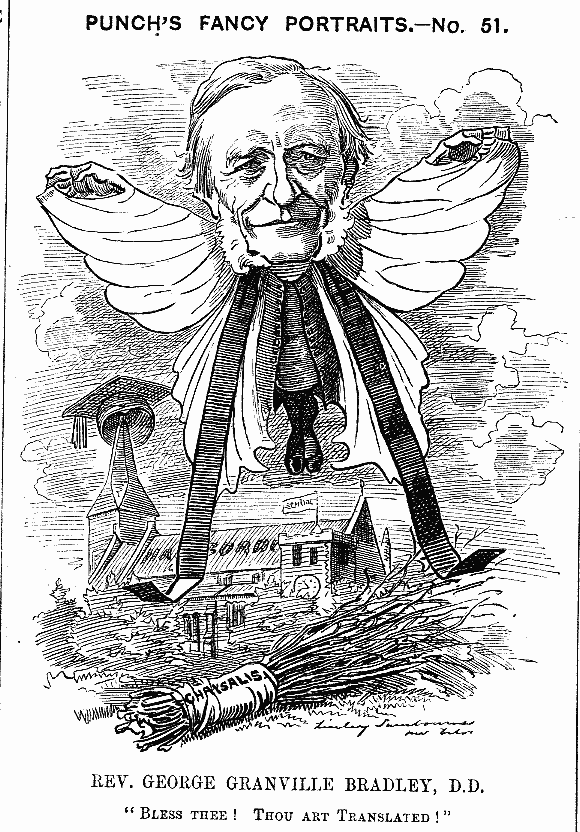
Punch cartoon of Bradley, on his appointment to Westminster. The caption reads, "Bless Thee! Thou Art Translated!"

George Granville Bradley CVO (11 December 1821 – 13 March 1903) was an English Anglican priest, scholar, and schoolteacher, who was Master of University College, Oxford (1870–1881) and Dean of Westminster (1881–1902).

== Life ==
He was a son of Charles Bradley (1789–1871), vicar of Glasbury, a noted evangelical Anglican preacher. Of 13 children of Charles Bradley by his first wife, George Granville Bradley was among the elder sons; his younger half-brothers included F. H. Bradley and A. C. Bradley.

Bradley was educated at Rugby under Thomas Arnold. He won an open scholarship at University College, Oxford, where in 1844, Bradley gained a first-class degree in literae humaniores. He was immediately elected to a Fellowship at University College and, in the following year, won the Chancellor's prize for the Latin essay. He was an assistant master at Rugby School from 1846 to 1858, when he succeeded G.E.L. Cotton as Headmaster of Marlborough College in Wiltshire. In the same year he look Holy Orders.

In 1870, Bradley was elected Master of his old college at Oxford. Under his mastership, he and the fellows of the college celebrated its apocryphal thousandth anniversary since its supposed founding by Alfred the Great. In 1874, he was appointed examining chaplain to the Archbishop of Canterbury, Dr Archibald Campbell Tait, under whom he had served at Rugby School. In 1874 and 1875, he was Select Preacher at Oxford; he was also Honorary Chaplain to the Queen, becoming Chaplain in Ordinary in 1876. At University College, he supported Christian Cole originally from the Sierra Leone Colony and Protectorate, when he joined the college in 1877. Cole was the first black African to be awarded a degree at Oxford University, and went on to be the first black African barrister to practise in the English law courts. In 1878, Bradley was chosen as the first chairman of the Association for the Education of Women, which aimed to promote the education of women at the university.

In 1881, Bradley was given a canonry in Worcester Cathedral; in August that year, he was appointed Dean of Westminster in succession to Arthur Penrhyn Stanley, whose pupil and intimate friend he had been, and whose biographer he became. Shortly afterwards he was conferred the degree of DD by University College, Oxford. By the turn of the 20th century, he was in declining health and had to be absent from his duties for considerable periods. He took part in the Coronation of King Edward VII and Queen Alexandra on 9 August 1902, and asked the King to be allowed to resign from his duties later the same month. For his service, he was invested as a Commander of the Royal Victorian Order (CVO) two days after the ceremony, on 11 August 1902.

Bradley was an Acting Chaplain of the 13th Middlesex (Queen's Westminsters) Volunteer Rifle Corps for 20 years, and received the Volunteer Officers' Decoration (VD) on 21 February 1902, before he resigned this appointment in November 1902.

The very reverend George Granville Bradley, of 42 Queen Anne's Gate, Westminster, died on 13 March 1903. He was buried at Westminster Abbey on 17 March. The pall-bearers included the Master of Trinity College, Cambridge, Henry Montagu Butler; the Master of University College, Oxford, James Franck Bright; and the Headmasters of Marlborough College and Rugby School.

F. D. How included Bradley in the 1904 book Six Great Schoolmasters.

== Works ==
Besides his Recollections of A. P. Stanley (1883) and Life of Dean Stanley (1892), Bradley published a revised version of Thomas Kerchever Arnold's Latin Prose Composition (commonly referred to by generations of Latin students as "Bradley's Arnold"); his more advanced intended work on Aids to Writing Latin Prose: with Exercises was edited and completed by T. L. Papillon. Further works were Lectures on Job (1884) and Ecclesiastes (1885).

== Family ==
Bradley married Marian Jane Philpot at Great Cressingham on 18 December 1849. They had two sons and five daughters; of these children one son, Arthur Granville Bradley (1850–1943), and four daughters were writers, including Margaret Louisa Woods, Emily Tennyson Bradley (married Alexander Murray Smith), Mabel Charlotte, the Lady Birchenough (the wife of Sir Henry Birchenough, public servant and business man) and Rose Marian Bradley.

== Sources ==
Academic offices
Preceded by Frederick Charles Plumptre	Master of University College, Oxford; 1870–1881	Succeeded by James Franck Bright
Church of England titles
Preceded by Arthur Penrhyn Stanley	Dean of Westminster; 1881–1902	Succeeded by Armitage Robinson
