= Eric Abbott =

English Anglican priest (1906–1983)

The Very Reverend Eric Abbott KCVO
- Dean of Westminster
- Abbott in 1950
- Church: Church of England
- In office: 1959 to 1974
- Predecessor: Alan Don
- Successor: Edward Carpenter

Personal details
- Born: 26 May 1906 Nottingham, Nottinghamshire, England
- Died: 6 June 1983 (aged 77) Haslemere, Surrey, England,
- Education: Jesus College, Cambridge; Westcott House, Cambridge

Eric Symes Abbott KCVO (26 May 1906 – 6 June 1983) was an English Anglican priest and academic administrator. He only spent three years in parish ministry, before beginning a career as a chaplain and academic administrator. He was warden of Lincoln Theological College from 1936 to 1945, and dean of King's College, London from 1945 to 1955. He moved into secular leadership as warden of Keble College, Oxford from 1956 to 1960. His final post was as Dean of Westminster from 1959 until he retired in 1974.

== Early life and education ==
Abbott was born on 26 May 1906 in Nottingham, Nottinghamshire, England, to William Henry Abbott and Mary Symes, both schoolteachers. Having won a scholarship, he was educated at Nottingham High School, an independent boys school in Nottingham. He studied classics at Jesus College, Cambridge, attaining a first class in Part I of the Tripos in 1927 and a second class in Part II in 1928. He graduated from the University of Cambridge with a Bachelor of Arts (BA) degree in 1928: as per tradition, his BA was promoted to a Master of Arts (MA Cantab) degree in 1932. He was awarded a Lambeth Doctor of Divinity (DD) degree in 1959.

== Ordained ministry ==
From 1928 to 1930, Abbott trained for ordination at Westcott House, Cambridge, a liberal Anglo-Catholic theological college. While there, he was heavily influenced by Bertram Cunningham, the principal of Westcott House. He also studied theology and a third class honours in part I of the theological Tripos in 1929.

Abbott was ordained in the Church of England as a deacon in 1930 and as a priest in 1931. From 1930 to 1932, he served his curacy at St John's Church, Smith Square in the Diocese of London. In 1932, he was invited to become chaplain of King's College, London, serving under the college's dean. He was additionally chaplain to Lincoln's Inn, one of the Inns of Court in London, from 1935 to 1936.

In 1936, at only the age of 30 and without a degree in theology, he was appointed Warden of Lincoln Theological College. He taught Anglicanism and pastoral theology to the students, and helped prepare them as parish priests. In 1940, he was additionally made a canon and prebendary of Lincoln Cathedral.

Following the end of the Second World War in 1945, he was invited back to King's College London to serve as its dean. The dean of King's College London is a unique position that reflects the religious foundation of the college: the dean is an Anglican priest who is head of the department and faculty of theology, warden of the hostel for ordinands, and senior chaplain to the whole college. He was honoured by being appointed chaplain to King George VI in February 1948, and, following the succession of Queen Elizabeth II to the throne, he was made chaplain to the queen in August 1952. In addition to his college work, privately he provided spiritual guidance via correspondence, writing a great number of letters and even holiday postcards. The ten years he spent as dean took a great toll on his health, exacerbating a pre-existing heart condition.

In 1956, Abbott was elected as the next warden of Keble College, Oxford; this was the first time the fellows of the college had directly elected their head of college. He was not an academic and so his role at the University of Oxford college was as an academic administrator. He "encouraged academic excellence" within the college, and consolidated its position within the university.

In November 1959, he was selected as the next Dean of Westminster, the head of Westminster Abbey: the Abbey is a Royal Peculiar, meaning that the dean answers directly to the monarch as head of the Church of England, instead of to any bishop or archbishop. He left Oxford in 1960 to take up the post. As dean, leading many national memorials and celebrations, he conducted three royal weddings: the wedding of Princess Margaret and Antony Armstrong-Jones, the wedding of Princess Alexandra and Angus Ogilvy, and the wedding of Princess Anne and Mark Phillips. After the death of Princess Margaret it was reported that she regarded Eric Abbott as "a father figure." He presided over the 900th anniversary celebrations of the founding of the abbey in 1965–1966. In the 1966 New Year Honours, he was appointed a Knight Commander of the Royal Victorian Order (KCVO), (although clergymen do not use the title "sir"). Despite his unstable health, he served fifteen years as dean before retiring in 1974.

== Personal life and legacy ==
Abbott never married. He died at Haslemere in 1983 and his funeral was held in Westminster Abbey. He is buried in the nave.

In his memory the Eric Symes Abbott Memorial Fund provides for annual lectures on spirituality, held alternately in Oxford and London. The first, delivered in 1986, was by Cardinal Basil Hume. A full copy of all the previous lectures is held at King's College London.

== Writings ==
- Escape or freedom? (Heffer and Sons, Cambridge, 1939)
- Foothold of faith (Dacre Press, Westminster, 1943)
- Catholicity: a study in the conflict of Christian traditions in the West (Dacre Press, Westminster, 1947)
- Education in the spiritual life (Doncaster, 1961)
- The compassion of God and the Passion of Christ (Geoffrey Bles, London, 1963)
