= Dean of Westminster =

Head of the chapter at Westminster Abbey

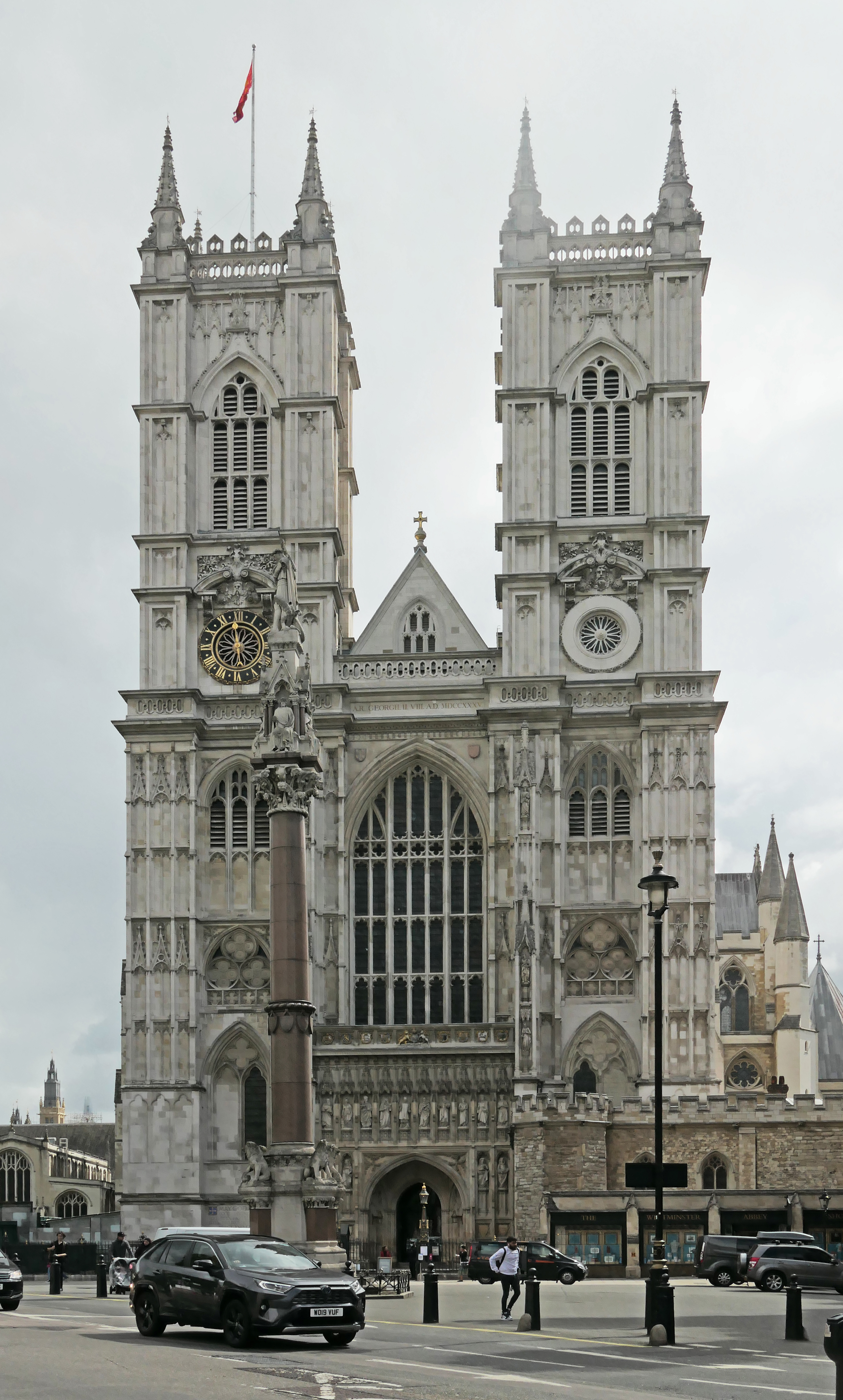
The west façade of Westminster Abbey

The dean of Westminster is the head of the chapter at Westminster Abbey. Due to the abbey's status as a royal peculiar, the dean answers directly to the British monarch (not to the bishop of London as ordinary, nor to the archbishop of Canterbury as metropolitan). Initially, the office was a successor to that of Abbot of Westminster, and was for the first 10 years cathedral dean for the Diocese of Westminster. The current dean is David Hoyle.

== List of deans ==
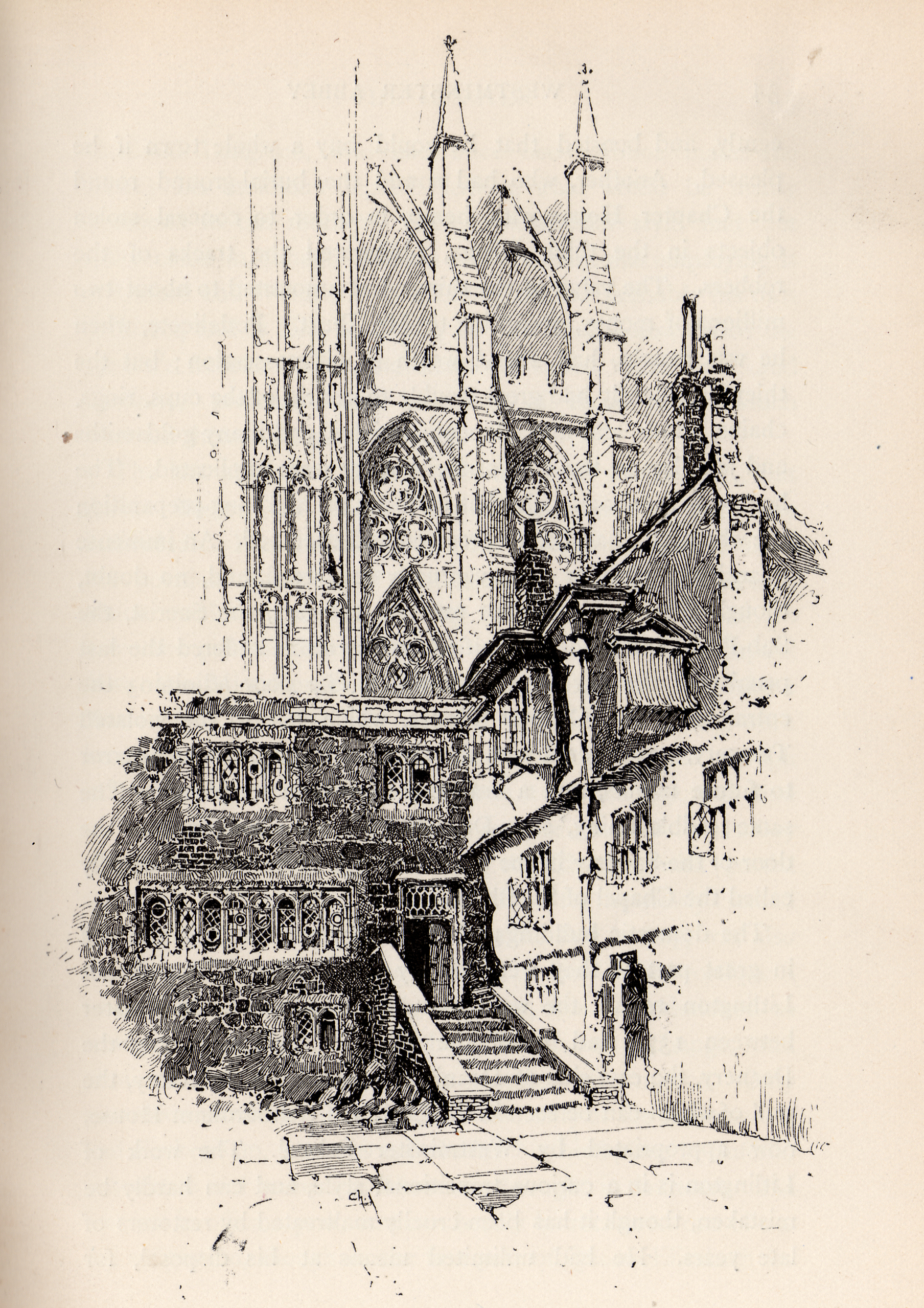
The Deanery at Westminster Abbey

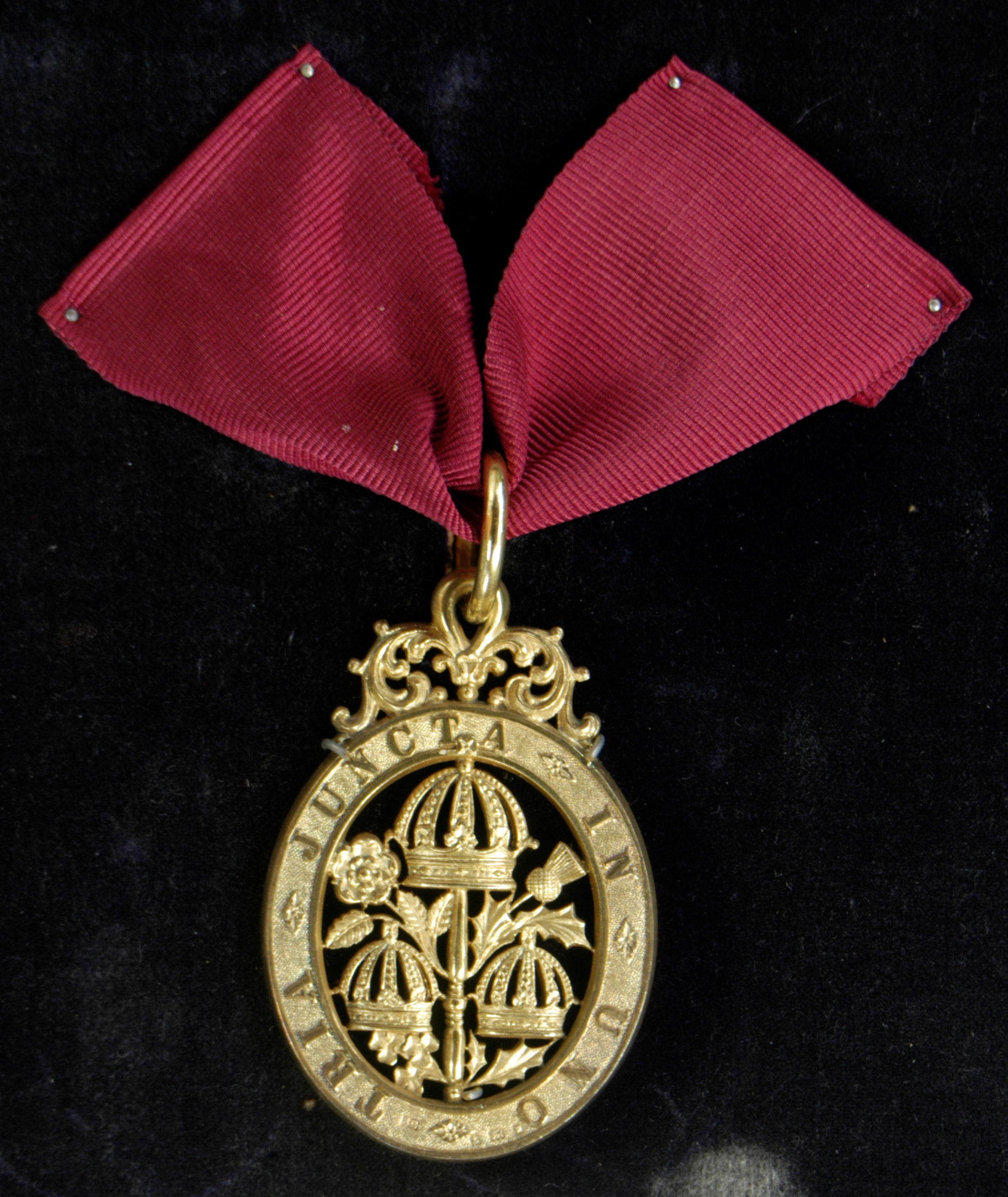
Neck badge of the Order of the Bath: the Dean of Westminster is Dean of the Order of the Bath ex officio

Name	Portrait	Term of office	
William Benson (formerly last abbot of the Benedictine abbey)		1540	1549^{[†]}
Richard Cox		1549	1553
Hugh Weston		1553	1556
Vacancy (restored as Benedictine abbey); John Feckenham, abbot		1556	1559
William Bill		1560	1561^{[†]}
Gabriel Goodman		1561	1601^{[†]}
Lancelot Andrewes		1601	1605
Richard Neile (in commendam as Bishop of Rochester from 1608)		1605	1610
George Montaigne		1610	1617
Robert Tounson		1617	1620
John Williams (in commendam as Bishop of Lincoln 1621–41, as Archbishop of York from 1641)		1620	1644
Richard Steward (not installed)		1644	1651^{[†]}
Vacancy (English Interregnum)		1651	1660
John Earle		1660	1662
John Dolben (in commendam as Bishop of Rochester from 1666 (Note: In 1666, John Dolben was additionally appointed Bishop of Rochester, retaining the Deanery of Westminster in commendam. His successor as Dean, Thomas Sprat, was additionally appointed to Rochester in 1684. From then until 1802, it was customary for the Bishop of Rochester to hold the Deanery of Westminster in commendam. These eight deans held both offices concurrently.))		1662	1683
Thomas Sprat (in commendam as Bishop of Rochester from 1684)		1683	1713^{[†]}
Francis Atterbury (in commendam as Bishop of Rochester)		1713	1723
Samuel Bradford (in commendam as Bishop of Rochester)		1723	1731^{[†]}
Joseph Wilcocks (in commendam as Bishop of Rochester)		1731	1756^{[†]}
Zachary Pearce (in commendam as Bishop of Rochester)		1756	1768
John Thomas (in commendam as Bishop of Rochester from 1774)		1768	1793^{[†]}
Samuel Horsley (in commendam as Bishop of Rochester)		1793	1802
William Vincent		1802	1815^{[†]}
John Ireland		1816	1842^{[†]}
Thomas Turton		1842	1845
Samuel Wilberforce		March–October 1845	
William Buckland		1845	1856^{[†]}
Richard Chenevix Trench		1856	1864
Arthur Penrhyn Stanley		1864	1881^{[†]}
George Granville Bradley		1881	1902
Armitage Robinson		1902	1911
Herbert Edward Ryle		1911	1925^{[†]}
William Foxley Norris		1925	1937^{[†]}
Paul de Labilliere		1938	1946^{[†]}
Alan Don		1946	1959
Eric Abbott		1959	1974
Edward Carpenter		1974	1985
Michael Mayne		1986	1996
Wesley Carr		1997	2006
John Hall		2006	2019
David Hoyle		2019	Present

== Notes ==
- ^{†} Died in office
