= Francesca Beauman =

Bookseller, writer and historian (born 1977)

- Born: 12 April 1977 (age 49); England
- Other name: Fran Beauman
- Occupations: Bookseller, writer and historian
- Years active: 2000s–present
- Spouse: James Bobin
- Children: 3
- Website: francescabeauman.com

Francesca Beauman (born 12 April 1977) is a writer, historian, and television presenter who lives in Bath, Somerset and is the editorial director of Persephone Books.

== Early life and education ==
Beauman is the daughter of Nicola Beauman, the founder of Persephone Books, and the economist Christopher Beauman. She has four siblings: Ned Beauman, William Lacey, Olivia Lacey and Josh Lacey.

She grew up in Hampstead, London and was educated at Cheltenham Ladies' College. She studied at the University of Cambridge, graduating with a first class degree in history, and writing her dissertation on the history of the pineapple.

== Career ==
While at Cambridge, Beauman formed a comedy act with Ania Dykczak. They went on to host a number of British television shows, including Ania, Fran and a Kettle of Fish (Channel 5, 2000), Show Me The Funny (Channel 4, 2002), Bring It On (BBC One, 2003–2004) and Heroes of History (Channel 5, 2005). Beauman was a contributor to My Famous Family and Britain's Best on UKTV History and also appeared as a guest panellist on Quote... Unquote and The Museum of Curiosity on BBC Radio 4.

Beauman is also a writer and historian and has particular expertise on the history of the pineapple and the history of Lonely Hearts ads, also known as personals.

She is the editorial director of Persephone Books and vice-chair of the Holburne Museum in Bath.

== Published works ==
Beauman has written the following books:

- The Literary Almanac: A Year of Seasonal Reading (Quercus Publishing, 2021)
- Matrimony, Inc.: From Personal Ads to Swiping Right, a Story of America Looking for Love (Simon and Schuster, 2020)
- How To Wear White: A Pocketbook for the Bride-to-Be (Bloomsbury Publishing, 2013)
- How To Crack An Egg With One Hand: A Pocketbook for the New Mother (Bloomsbury Publishing, 2011)
- Shapely Ankle Preferr'd: A History of Lonely Hearts Ads, 1695–2010 (Chatto and Windus, 2011)
- The Woman's Book (Weidenfeld & Nicolson, 2007)
- The Pineapple: King of Fruits (Chatto and Windus, 2005)

== Personal life ==
In 2005, Beauman married the film director James Bobin, with whom she has three children. They live in Bath, Somerset.
