= Sally Carson (author) =

British author (1902–41)

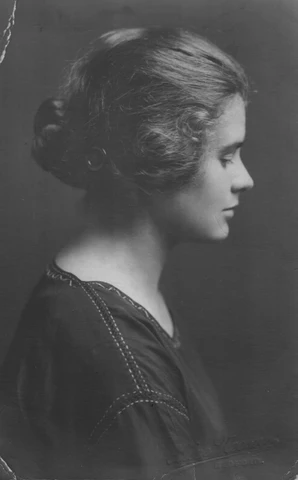
- Born: Sylvia Mary Margaret Carson; 30 September 1902; Thornton Heath, Croydon, England
- Died: 21 June 1941 (aged 38); Leeds, England
- Occupations: Novelist, playwright
- Writing career
- Language: English
- Notable work: Crooked Cross

Sylvia Mary Margaret Carson (30 September 1902–21 June 1941), known as Sally Carson, was an English author whose acclaimed 1934 novel, Crooked Cross, foretold the Nazi threat in Germany. The novel was republished in April 2025.

== Early life ==
Carson, who had two older sisters, was born on 30 September 1902 in Thornton Heath, Surrey, England. Her father, Arthur Louis Carson, died four years later and her mother, Charlotte Winstanley Stratford, brought up the family in Dorset. As a young woman, Carson taught dance, while also working as a publisher’s reader and spending her holidays in Bavaria with friends.

== Literary work ==
Carson's most famous novel Crooked Cross was the first of a trilogy, together with The Prisoner (1936) and A Traveller Came By (1938). She began to write Crooked Cross (Note: Crooked Cross refers to the shape of the Nazi swastika.) after visiting Bavaria, Germany. The book "charts the growing disaffection of a group of German youth who feel lost and ignored, and so turn towards a new authoritarian leader" and it "predicted the scale of the Nazi threat". It covers "a six-month period of momentous political change: Hitler became chancellor, the Nazis gained an effective majority in the Reichstag, Dachau was opened, and Jews were barred from public-service jobs".

The book was published in 1934, a year after the events it recounts. It was well reviewed, Madeline Linford, founder of the Manchester Guardian’s women’s page, chose it as a book of the year. However, it and its sequel were soon overshadowed by Phyllis Bottome's The Mortal Storm, published in 1937 and made into a film starring James Stewart in 1940. According to Caroline Moorehead "The Mortal Storm not only traces an almost identical plot [to The Prisoner] but is uncannily similar in tone and style. How did no one notice?"

A dramatised version of Crooked Cross premiered at Birmingham Repertory Theatre in 1935, produced by Herbert Prentice. (Note: Prentice's prompt book and a letter to him from Carson are held by the New York Public Library.) In 1937 it was performed at the Westminster Theatre, in London's West End, starring Anne Firth. The play was published in a volume on its own in 1938. It was revived in New York in 2025.

Nicola Beauman, the founder of Persephone Books, happened upon Carson’s work while researching pre-Second World War British women writers. She tracked down a remaining copy and republished it in April 2025, ahead of the 80th anniversary of the end of the war.

== Personal life ==
Carson married the publisher Eric Humphries (1894–1968; his second marriage), son of the eponymous co-founder of Lund Humphries, in London in 1938. They lived in Thorpe, North Yorkshire and had three children, twins Tamsin and David, and another daughter, Sorel. She died of breast cancer on 21 June 1941, aged 38, at a nursing home in Leeds.
