= Charles Thomas (historian) =

British historian and archaeologist (1928–2016)

Professor Charles Thomas CBE DL FBA FRHistS FSA FSA Scot
- Born: Antony Charles Thomas; 26 April 1928; Camborne, Cornwall, England
- Died: 7 April 2016 (aged 87); St Clement, Cornwall, England
- Occupations: Archaeologist; historian; author
- Title: Professor of Cornish Studies at Exeter University
- Spouses: Molly Sims (m. 1953, divorced); Jessica Mann (m. 1959)
- Children: 4
- Relatives: Fred Thomas (grandson)

Antony Charles Thomas, CBE, DL, FBA, FRHistS, FSA, FSA Scot (26 April 1928 – 7 April 2016) was a British historian and archaeologist who was Professor of Cornish Studies at Exeter University, and the first Director of the Institute of Cornish Studies, from 1971 until his retirement in 1991. He was recognised as a Bard of the Cornish Gorseth with the name Gwas Godhyan in 1953.

== Birth, early life and education ==
He was born 26 April 1928 in Camborne, Cornwall, the son of Donald Woodroffe Thomas and Viva (née Warrington) Thomas.

He attended Elmhirst Preparatory day school, Camborne and Upcott House School, Okehampton. In 1940 he received a scholarship to Bradfield College, but on the advice of a family friend was instead sent to Winchester College on a 'Headmaster's Nomination'. In 1945 at the age of 17 he joined the army as a Young Soldier and later was an ammunition examiner in the Royal Army Ordnance Corps; he would serve in Northern Ireland, Portsmouth, Scotland and Egypt, the latter of which helped inspire his interest in archaeology. He demobilised in 1948 at which point he matriculated into Corpus Christi College, Oxford, receiving a BA Honours degree in Jurisprudence in 1951. He then studied under V. Gordon Childe at the UCL Institute of Archaeology and received a Diploma in Prehistoric Archaeology in 1953.

== Academic career ==
Thomas' first public lecture was entitled 'The Glebe Lands of Camborne' for the Camborne Old Cornwall Society in 1946, while on a week's leave from the Army in Portsmouth. His academic career officially began as a part-time Workers' Educational Association lecturer in archaeology in Cornwall 1954–58. He became Lecturer in Archaeology at the University of Edinburgh from 1958 to 1967. From 1967 to 1971, he was appointed the first Professor of Archaeology at the University of Leicester. During this period, he became a FSA in 1960 and was awarded a Leverhulme Fellowship for 1965 to 1967.

In 1972 Thomas founded and became director of the Institute of Cornish Studies, affiliated with the University of Exeter at which he was the first Professor of Cornish Studies. At this time he also launched and edited its learned journal, Cornish Studies. He defined its field as:

"the study of all aspects of man and his handiwork in the regional setting (Cornwall and Scilly), past, present and future. The development of society, industry and the landscape in our fast changing world is as much of concern … as the history of those vast topics in the recent and remote past."

In 1983, he was awarded a Doctorate of Literature by the University of Oxford. He was Sir John Rhys Fellow of the University of Oxford and Visiting Senior Research Fellow at Jesus College from 1985 to 1986.

He retired as Director of the Institute and Professor of Cornish Studies in 1991; he was awarded an emeritus Fellowship at Exeter by the Leverhulme Trust (1992–94). Thomas was also awarded Doctor of Letters, honoris causa, by the National University of Ireland in 1996.

== Archaeological work ==
Thomas' first archaeological excavation was at the Bronze Age barrow on Godrevy headland, St Ives Bay in 1950, and he initially saw himself as a prehistorian. He was Director of excavations at Gwithian, Cornwall (1949–1963), which revealed an important post-Roman occupation.

He was best known for his contributions to early medieval archaeology, particularly to the archaeology of early Christianity in Britain and Ireland. After Gwithian, excavations at early Christian sites included Nendrum Monastery, County Down in 1954; a chapel at East Porth, Teän, Isles of Scilly in 1956; Iona Abbey, Argyll in 1956–1963; Ardwall Island, Kirkcudbright; and Abercorn, West Lothian 1964–65. His first major work in this field was The Early Christian Archaeology of North Britain (1971), followed by similarly influential volumes including Christianity in Roman Britain to AD 500 (1981) and And Shall These Mute Stones Speak?: post-Roman inscriptions in Western Britain (1994).

== Roles in organisations ==
Learned societies

He was a board member of the Royal Institution of Cornwall and Honorary Librarian of its Courtney Library until 2011, having previously served as its president in 1970–71. He was a Fellow of the British Academy, and also President of the Council for British Archaeology 1970–73.

He was President of the Cornwall Archaeological Society 1984–88 and of the Society for Medieval Archaeology, 1986–89.

He was President of the Society for Landscape Studies from 1993. He was president of the Cornish Methodist Historical Association in 1993. He was Chairman of the Society for Church Archaeology, 1995–98.

Quangos

He was Chairman of the BBC South West Regional Advisory Council, 1975–80; of the Department of the Environment Area Archaeology Committee, Cornwall and Devon, 1975–79; and of the Cornwall Committee for Rescue Archaeology 1976–88.

He was a Member of the Royal Commission on Historical Monuments (England), 1983–97, its Acting Chairman, 1988–89 and Vice Chairman, 1991–97).

== Honours ==
- Fellow of the Society of Antiquaries of Scotland (FSA Scot), 1958.
- Fellow of the Society of Antiquaries of London (FSA), 1960.
- Honorary Member of the Royal Irish Academy, 1973.
- Honorary Fellow of the Royal Society of Antiquaries of Ireland, 1975.
- Fellow of the Royal Historical Society (FRHistS), 1982.
- Fellow of the British Academy (FBA), 1989.
- Honorary Fellow of St David's University College, Lampeter, 1992.
- Fellow of University College London, 1992.
- Honorary Doctor of Literature National University of Ireland, 1996.
- Honorary Fellow of the Society of Antiquaries of Scotland, 2000.
- William Frend Medal, Society of Antiquaries of London, 1982.
- Jenner Medal, Royal Institution of Cornwall, 2008.
- Deputy Lieutenant of Cornwall (DL), 1988.
- Commander of the Order of the British Empire (CBE), 1991 New Year Honours.

See full Biography in Gathering the Fragments, 2012, pp. 177–183, ISBN 1908878037.

== Personal life ==
In 1953, Thomas married Molly Sims, though they soon after divorced; she later married Neville Marriner. In 1959, Thomas married writer Jessica Mann, daughter of F. A. Mann, a week after she completed her Cambridge finals, and they had two sons and two daughters. His grandson Fred Thomas is a politician.

Thomas was a member of Mebyon Kernow.

Thomas died from bronchopneumonia at his home in St Clement, Cornwall, on 7 April 2016.

== Publications ==
=== Key publications (in date order) ===
- 1967: Christian Antiquities of Camborne
- 1971: The Early Christian Archaeology of North Britain ISBN 0-19-214102-3
- 1971: Britain and Ireland in Early Christian Times ISBN 0-500-57002-7
- 1973: St Ninian’s Isle and its Treasure (with A. Small and D. Wilson). ISBN 0-19-714101-3
- 1974: Military Insignia of Cornwall (with D. Ivall). ISBN 0-903686-07-4
- 1981: Christianity in Roman Britain to AD 500 ISBN 0-7134-1442-1
- 1985: Exploration of a Drowned Landscape ISBN 0-7134-4853-9
- 1986: Celtic Britain ISBN 0-500-02107-4
- 1988: Views and Likenesses: photographers in Cornwall and Scilly 1839–70 ISBN 1-871294-00-2
- 1993: Tintagel, Arthur and Archaeology ISBN 0-7134-6690-1
- 1994: And Shall These Mute Stones Speak?: post-Roman inscriptions in Western Britain ISBN 0-7083-1160-1
- 1998: Christian Celts, Messages and Images ISBN 0-7524-2849-7
- 1999: Silent in the Shroud ISBN 1-874012-21-0
- 1999: The Penzance Market Cross
- 2002: Whispering Reeds (with D. R. Howlett). ISBN 1-84217-085-6
- 2003: Vita Sancti Paterni ISBN 0-905285-73-5
- 2012: Gathering the Fragments ISBN 1-908878-03-7

=== Alphabetical list of publications (incomplete) ===
- An Archaeological Survey of the Rame Peninsula. Institute of Cornish Studies. 1974.
- 'An Archaic Place-name Element from the Isles of Scilly'; The Bulletin Board of Celtic Studies, Vol XXVIII, Pt II, May 1979, pp. 229–233.
- And shall these mute stones speak?: post-Roman inscriptions in western Britain; Cardiff : University of Wales Press, 1994. ISBN 0-7083-1160-1
- 'Archaeology and Local Government', New Approaches to our Past, T C Carvill (ed), University of Southampton Department of Archaeology, 1978, pp. 63–77.
- 'Archaeology in Cornwall'; Summer Meeting Programme, Royal Archaeological Institute, 1973, pp. 10–13.
- Bede, Archaeology, and the Cult of Relics: Jarrow Lecture 1973; 1973
- Britain and Ireland in Early Christian times : A.D. 400-800; Library of medieval civilization series; London : Thames and Hudson, 1971 ISBN 0-500-56002-1
- The Bronze Age in the South West, Papers in Regional Archaeology series, 1; Bristol : Univ. of Bristol, Archaeological Review, 1969
- 'Bronze Age Spade Marks at Gwithian, Cornwall'; The Spade in Northern and Atlantic Europe, Alan Gailey and Alexander Fenton (eds), Ulster Folk Museum, Institute of Irish Studies, Belfast, 1970, pp. 10–17.
- 'Carwynnen Quoit'; Camborne Festival Magazine, November 1985, pp. 14–15.
- Celtic Britain; Ancient peoples and places series; London : Thames and Hudson, 1997. ISBN 0-500-27935-7 Originally published: 1986 ISBN 0-500-02107-4.
- "The character and origins of Roman Dumnonia"; Article from Rural Settlement in Roman Britain (Council for British Archaeology Research Report 7), 1966, pp. 74–98.
- Christian Antiquities of Camborne; H.E. Warne, 1967
- Christian Celts : messages & images; Stroud : Tempus, 2003 ISBN 0-7524-2849-7 Originally published: 1998 ISBN 0-7524-1411-9
- Christian Sites in West Penwith Excursion Guide : Saturday, 6 April 1968 / The Society For Medieval Archaeology and the Cornwall Archaeological Society; Truro : Cornwall Office Services (printers), 1968
- Christian sites in West Penwith : excursion guide, Thursday 27 June 1974 [for] the Royal Society of Antiquaries of Ireland; [Redruth], Institute of Cornish Studies, 1974. General note '... produced for the RSAI Summer Conference (Penzance), 1974 ISBN 0-903686-04-X
- Christianity in Roman Britain to AD 500 ; London : Batsford Academic and Educational, c1981. ISBN 0-7134-1442-1.
- 'Chun Castle and Quoit'; Summer Meeting Programme, Royal Archaeological Institute, 1973, pp. 56–59.
- The cliff castle at The Rumps, St. Minver (Series: Cornwall Archaeological Society. Field Guides; no.9 ); Cornwall Archaeological Society, 1963.
- 'Coast and Cliff Names of Gwithian and the North Cliffs'; Journal of the Royal Institution of Cornwall New Series Vol.5, Pt.1, 1965, pp12–36; with corrections and additions in Vol.5, Pt.3, 1967, pp291–6.
- 'The context of Tintagel : a new model for the diffusion of Post-Roman Mediterranean imports'; Cornish Archaeology 27, 1988, pp. 7–25; also offprint(Institute of Cornish Studies Varia series, No. 8).
- Cornish Chapel Stories; Lambessow : Summaries and Plain Digits, 2008 [compiled and edited under the nom de plume 'Cornubiensis'].
- 'Cornish Dialect Studies 2: Cornish Dialect Derivatives of Middle English stoc 'stump', sticken 'to stick' '; Cornish Studies 6, 1978, pp14–19. ISBN 0-903686-28-7.
- 'Cornish Dialect Studies 3: Arthur Rablen's 1937 Essay'; Cornish Studies 8, 1980, pp37–47. ISBN 0-903686-32-5.
- Cornish Studies and Cornish Topics : Some Notes on the Scheme of Subject-headings, in Use in the Catalogue of the Library at Lowenac, Camborne; Worthing : E. D. Paine [Printing], 1970
- "Cornish Volunteers in the Eighteenth Century (1745-1783)"; in Devon and Cornwall Notes and Queries, Vols. 27–28, 1956-61 Note: also includes Cornish Volunteers in the Early Nineteenth Century (1803–1808).
- 'The Duke of Cornwall's Light Infantry Museum Project (preliminary report)'; Cornish Studies 8, 1980, pp63–64. ISBN 0-903686-32-5.
- The early Christian archaeology of North Britain : the Hunter Marshall lectures delivered at the University of Glasgow in January and February 1968; London : Oxford University Press for the University of Glasgow, 1971 ISBN 0-19-214102-3
- English Heritage Book of Tintagel; Batsford, 1993. ISBN 0-7134-6690-1
- Excavation of a Dark Ages Site, Gwithian Cornwall : Interim Report; West Cornwall Field Club, [1954]
- Excavations at Tintagel parish churchyard Cornwall, spring 1990 : interim report / Jacqueline A. Nowakowski and Charles Thomas; Cornwall Archaeological Unit, 1990. ISBN 1-871162-90-4
- Exploration of a drowned landscape : archaeology and history of the Isles of Scilly / Charles London : Batsford, 1985. ISBN 0-7134-4853-9
- Fletcher's Lane; Lambessow : Summaries and Plain Digits, 2012 [Fiction]
- Gathering the Fragments: The Selected Essays of a Groundbreaking Historian; Sheffield, The Cornovia Press, 2012. ISBN 1-908878-02-9, ISBN 1-908878-03-7
- "A Glossary of Spoken English in the Isles of Scilly" in Journal of the Royal Institution of Cornwall, 1979
- Godrevy light, Charles Thomas with Jessica Mann/ Truro, Twelveheads Press, 2009. ISBN 978-0-906294-70-3
- "Grass-marked Pottery in Cornwall" in Studies in Ancient Europe; 1968.
- Grave news from Tintagel : an account of a second season of archaeological excavation at Tintagel Churchyard, Cornwall, 1991 / Jacqueline A. Nowakowski and Charles Thomas with a contribution from Chris Crowe; Truro : Cornwall Archaeological Unit, Cornwall County Council and Institute of Cornish Studies, University of Exeter, 1992
- Greg McGrath, Badlands Ranger: A Gripping Tale of the Utah Panhandle; Lambessow : Summaries and Plain Digits, 2011 [Fiction]
- Gwithian : notes on the Church, parish and St. Gothian's Chapel; Redruth : Earles Press, 1964
- Gwithian : Ten Years' Work (1949–1958); Gwithian : West Cornwall Field Club Excavation Staff, 1958
- The henge monuments at Castilly, Lanivet (Series: Cornwall Archaeological Society. Field guides No.8); P.A.S. Pool, 1962
- 'Hermits on Islands or Priests in a Landscape'; Cornish Studies 6, 1978, pp28–44. ISBN 0-903686-28-7.
- The history of Christianity in Cornwall : AD 500-2000 / Charles Thomas and Joanna Mattingly; Truro : Royal Institution of Cornwall, 2000 ISBN 1-898166-14-5 (Published to accompany Millennium Exhibition commencing 11 December 1999)
- The importance of being Cornish : an inaugural lecture delivered in the University of Exeter on 8 March 1973 / Exeter : University of Exeter, 1973 ISBN 0-900771-80-1
- The Institute's Cornish dialect project : progress report on the first nine months' work, July 1978 to March 1979 / Adam Sharpe and Charles Thomas; Redruth : Institute of Cornish Studies, 1979. (Special reports / Institute of Cornish Studies; no.4) ISBN 0-903686-20-1
- The island of St. Patrick : Church and ruling dynasties in Fingal and Meath, 400-1148 / Ailbhe MacShamhráin, editor; [Charles Thomas ... et al.]; Dublin : Four Courts Press, c2004. ISBN 1-85182-867-2
- Irish colonists in south-west Britain; Redruth : Institute of Cornish Studies, 1973
- "The Irish Settlements in Post-roman Western Britain : A Survey of the Evidence" in Journal of the Royal Institution of Cornwall New Series, Vol.6, Pt.4, 1972, pp251–274.
- Is Archaeology Necessary? : Presidential Address, Section H, British Association For the Advancement of Science, Bath, September, 1978; Pool : Institute of Cornish Studies, 1978
- John Harris of Bolenowe, poet and preacher, 1820-1884 : a tribute : a lecture delivered at the Royal Institution of Cornwall, Truro, Monday 19 March 1984 by Charles Thomas for the Cornish Methodist Historical Association, 1984.
- "Lyonesse Revisited : The Early Walls of Scilly"/ Peter Fowler and Charles Thomas in Antiquity, Vol.53, No.209, November 1979. pp. 188–189.
- The medieval Cornish drama / editor Charles Thomas (Series Special bibliography; No. 3); Bosgea : Cornwall Archaeological Society, 1969
- Merther Uny, Wendron / Charles Thomas director (Series Field guide; 11); St Ives (Cornwall) : Cornwall Archaeological Society, 1968 ISBN 0-9500308-0-5
- Methodism and self-improvement in nineteenth century Cornwall, (Series: Cornish Methodist Historical Association. Occasional publications; no.9 ); Cornish Methodist Historical Association, 1965
- Military insignia of Cornwall/ D. Endean Ivall and Charles Thomas; Publication Date: 1974; Pool, Redruth: Penwith Books (for the) Duke of Cornwall's Light Infantry Regimental Museum, ISBN 0-903686-07-4 and Supplement: 1976 ISBN 0-903686-14-7
- "The "Monster" Episode in Adomnan's Life of St. Columba" in Cryptozoology 7, 1988, pp38–45.
- Mr Holmes in Cornwall : a critical explanation of the late Dr. Watson's narrative entitled "the Devil's foot" / by Percy Trevelyan; Redruth : Penwith, 1980 ISBN 0-903686-31-7 Written by Charles Thomas as the fictitious Percy Trevelyan, M.D. "Originally published, Inverness, Printed by Carruthers, 1927"
- Mrs Percival's endowed school at Penponds and Treslothan Camborne : 1761 to 1876; Redruth (Institute of Cornish Studies), 1982. ISBN 0-903686-38-4
- "Ninth-century Sculpture in Cornwall : A Note" in British Archaeological Reports: Anglo-Saxon and Viking Age Sculpture and Its Context...edited by James Lang, 1978.
- "Notes on the Late Bronze Age Site at Gwithian Cornwall : Gwithian 1957" / Issued by the Excavation Staff; Series: Field Guide; No.4; West Cornwall Field Club, 1957
- Penzance market cross : a Cornish wonder re-wondered; Penzance : Penlee House Gallery & Museum, 1999
- People and Pottery in Dark Age Cornwall: Series Field Guide; No.6; West Cornwall Field Club, 1960 (Reprinted From Old Cornwall, Vol.v, No.11, 1960 )
- Phillack Church : an illustrated history of the Celtic, Norman and medieval foundations; Publisher British Publishing Co, 1961 New editions 1969 and 1977
- A preliminary hand-list of the guide books to the Isles of Scilly (from 1816) / (compiled by Charles Thomas) Special bibliographies series, no.4; Redruth : Institute of Cornish Studies, 1978
- The principal antiquities of the Land's End district (with Peter Pool): 1954; also: 2nd Edition 1956; 3rd Edition 1957; 4th Ed. 1959, 5th Ed. 1960; 6th Ed. 1961; 7th Ed. 1962, 8th Ed. 1963, 9th Ed. 1964; 10th ed. 1965, 11th Ed. 1966; 12th Ed 1967;13th Ed. Revised 1968; 14th Ed 1969; 15th Ed. Revised, 1970; 16th Ed. 1980.
- A provisional list of imported pottery in post-Roman Western Britain & Ireland / Charles Thomas; (with an appendix on Tintagel by O.J. Padel); Redruth : Institute of Cornish Studies, 1981. Special report of the Institute of Cornish Studies series; no.7. ISBN 0-903686-33-3
- Real Cornish Humour; Lambessow : Summaries and Plain Digits, 2008 [compiled and edited under the nom de plume 'Cornubiensis'].
- Research objectives in British archaeology, edited by Charles Thomas; London : Council for British Archaeology, c1983. ISBN 0-906780-32-2
- Rural Settlement in Roman Britain: Papers Given at a C.B.A. Conference Held at St. Hugh’s College, Oxford, 1 to 3 January 1965, edited by Charles Thomas; Series CBA research reports, no.7; London :Council for British Archaeology, 1966
- The Sacrifice in Cornwall, Series: Studies in the Folk-lore of Cornwall, no.2; 1952
- "Scilly's statue-menhir rediscovered" / Paul Ashbee & Charles Thomas in Antiquity, vol.64, no.244, September 1990
- The story of Gwithian Chapel : (Gwithian Methodist Church); [Truro : Charles Thomas, 1999]
- The Taboo in Cornwall, (Series: Studies in the Folk-lore of Cornwall, No.1 ); 1951
- Three early accounts of the Isles of Scilly : James Beeverell, 1707, Graeme Spence, 1792, Henry Spry, 1800 / edited by Charles Thomas; Redruth : Penwith Books, 1979. ISBN 0-903686-22-8
- Tintagel Castle / [text by Charles Thomas]; English Heritage Publication Date: 1986 ISBN 1-85074-118-2
- To the lighthouse': the story of Godrevy light, Cornwall; Truro : Summaries and Plain Digits, 1985. ISBN 0-903686-45-7
- "Topographical Notes. - 3 : Rosnat, Rostat, and the Early Irish Church" From Ériu, Vol.xxii, 1971
- Trencrom Hill : A Property of the National Trust; Camborne : Camborne Printing and Stationery Co., 1957
- "Types and Distribution of Pre-Norman Fields in Cornwall and Scilly", (Series: British Archaeological Reports; 48: Early Land Allotment in the British Isles. a Survey of Recent Work. Edited by H.C. Bowen and P.J. Fowler), 1978
- Views and likenesses : early photographers and their work in Cornwall and the Isles of Scilly 1839-1870; Truro : Royal Institution of Cornwall, 1988. ISBN 1-871294-00-2
- "Vita Sancti Paterni: The Life of Saint Padarn and the Original Miniu", Trivium 33 (2003)(with David Howlett).
- What do we want from regional broadcasting? : a report of a seminar held at Truro, 28 June 1978 by the BBC South-West Regional Advisory Council / edited by Charles Thomas; Redruth : Institute of Cornish Studies, 1978. Special reports of Institute of Cornish Studies series; no.3; ISBN 0-903686-16-3
- Whispering reeds : or, the Anglesey Catamanus inscription stript bare : a detective story; Oxford : Oxbow, 2002. ISBN 1-84217-085-6
