= Edmund de Waal =

British artist and author (born 1964)

Edmund de Waal CBE
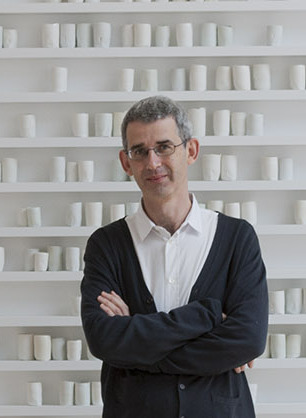
- de Waal in 2013
- Born: Edmund Arthur Lowndes de Waal; 10 September 1964 (age 62); Nottingham, United Kingdom
- Education: The King's School, Canterbury; University of Cambridge; University of Sheffield
- Occupations: Artist, potter and author
- Known for: Large-scale installations of porcelain vessels
- Father: Victor de Waal
- Relatives: Alex de Waal (brother); Thomas de Waal (brother); Elisabeth de Waal (grandmother); Viktor von Ephrussi (great-grandfather)
- Awards: Windham-Campbell Literature Prize
- Website: edmunddewaal.com

Edmund Arthur Lowndes de Waal, CBE (born 10 September 1964) is an English contemporary artist, potter and author. He is known for his large-scale installations of porcelain vessels often created in response to collections and archives or the history of a particular place. De Waal's book The Hare with Amber Eyes was awarded the Costa Book Award for Biography, Royal Society of Literature Ondaatje Prize in 2011 and Windham–Campbell Literature Prize for Non-Fiction in 2015. De Waal's second book, The White Road, tracing his journey to discover the history of porcelain, was released in 2015.

He lives and works in London, England.

== Early life ==
De Waal was born in Nottingham, England, the son of Esther Aline (née Lowndes-Moir), an historian and spiritual writer and Victor de Waal, a chaplain of the University of Nottingham who later became the Dean of Canterbury Cathedral. His grandfather was Hendrik de Waal, a Dutch businessman who moved to England. His paternal grandmother Elisabeth and great-grandfather Viktor von Ephrussi were members of the Ephrussi family, a history of which was chronicled in The Hare with Amber Eyes. Elisabeth de Waal's first novel, The Exiles Return, was published by Persephone Books in 2013. De Waal's siblings include barrister John de Waal (husband of author Kit de Waal), Alex de Waal who is director of the World Peace Foundation, and Caucasus expert Thomas de Waal.

== Education and early ceramic work ==
De Waal's interest in ceramics began aged five when his father took an evening class at the Lincoln School of Art, this early introduction to pottery influenced de Waal's later enthusiasm for pursuing an art practice based in ceramics.

De Waal was educated at The King's School, Canterbury, where he was taught pottery by the potter Geoffrey Whiting (1919–1988), a student of Bernard Leach. At 17, de Waal began a two-year apprenticeship with Whiting, deferring his entry into University of Cambridge. During the apprenticeship de Waal made hundreds of earthenware and stoneware pots, such as casseroles and honey pots. In 1983, de Waal took up his place at Trinity Hall, Cambridge, to read English. He was awarded a scholarship in 1983 and graduated with first class honours in 1986.

Following graduation, de Waal began to follow the discipline of British studio pottery, to create inexpensive domestic pots with good earth-tone colours. He moved to Herefordshire where he built a kiln and set up a pottery making functional stoneware pots in the Leach tradition, but the enterprise was not financially successful. In 1988, de Waal moved to inner-city Sheffield and began experimenting with working in porcelain.

In 1990 de Waal obtained a Daiwa Anglo-Japanese Foundation Scholarship, under which he spent a year obtaining a post-graduate diploma in Japanese language at Sheffield University and continued an additional year's study. Whilst studying in Japan at the Mejiro Ceramics studio de Waal also worked on a monograph of Bernard Leach, researching his papers and journals in the archive room of the Japanese Folk Crafts Museum. During this time de Waal began to make series of porcelain jars with pushed-in, gestural sides, arranged in groups and sequences.

== Art and ceramics ==
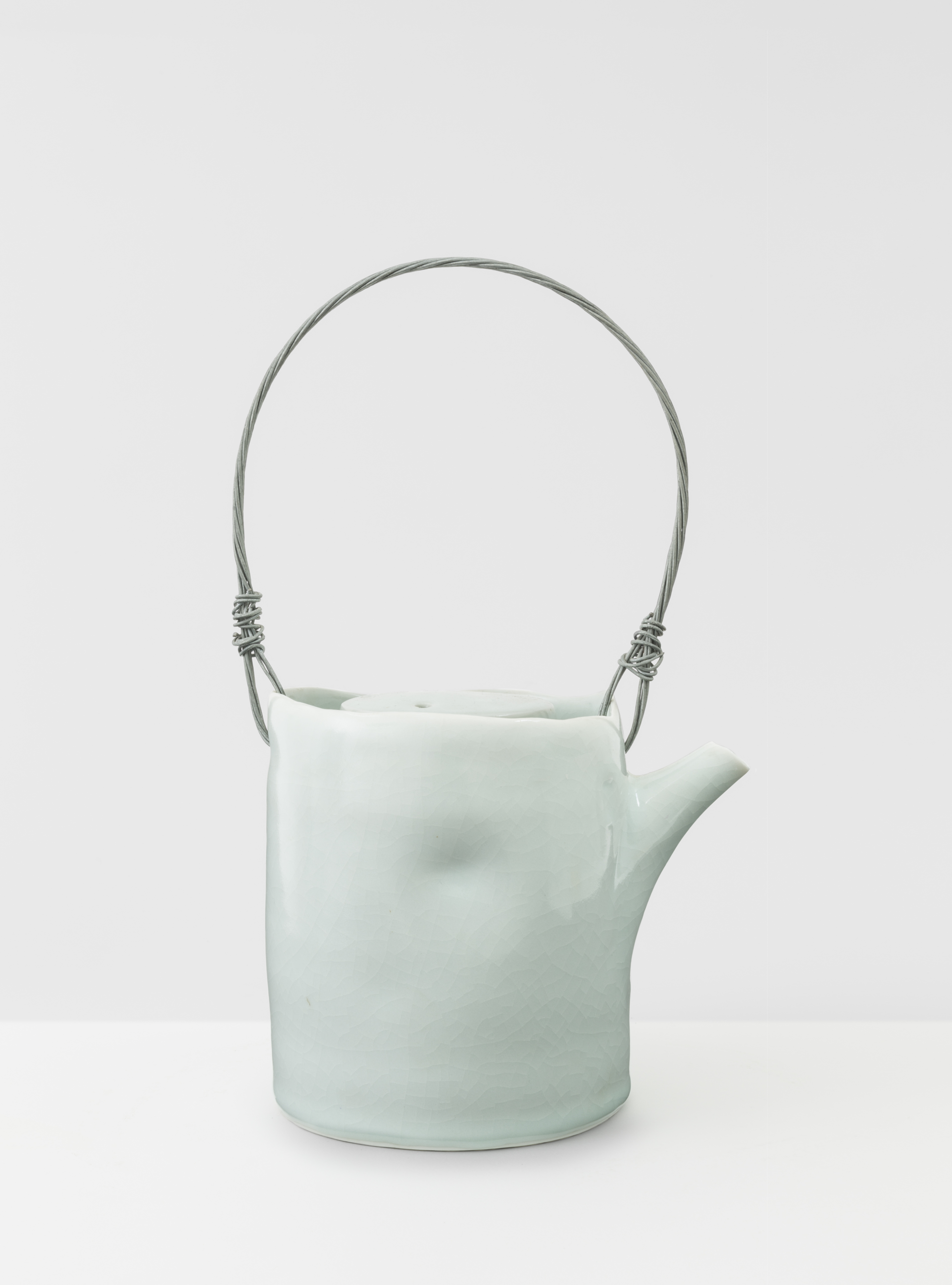
Teapot, 1997 – an early work in porcelain by de Waal

On returning to Britain in 1993, de Waal settled in London and began making his distinctive ceramics, porcelain with a celadon glaze. Focusing on essentially classical vessel shapes but with the inclusion of indentations or pinches and subtle variations in tone and texture in the style de Waal began while in Japan, these pots slowly gained the attention of the British craft industry leading to his first exhibition at Egg London in 1995.

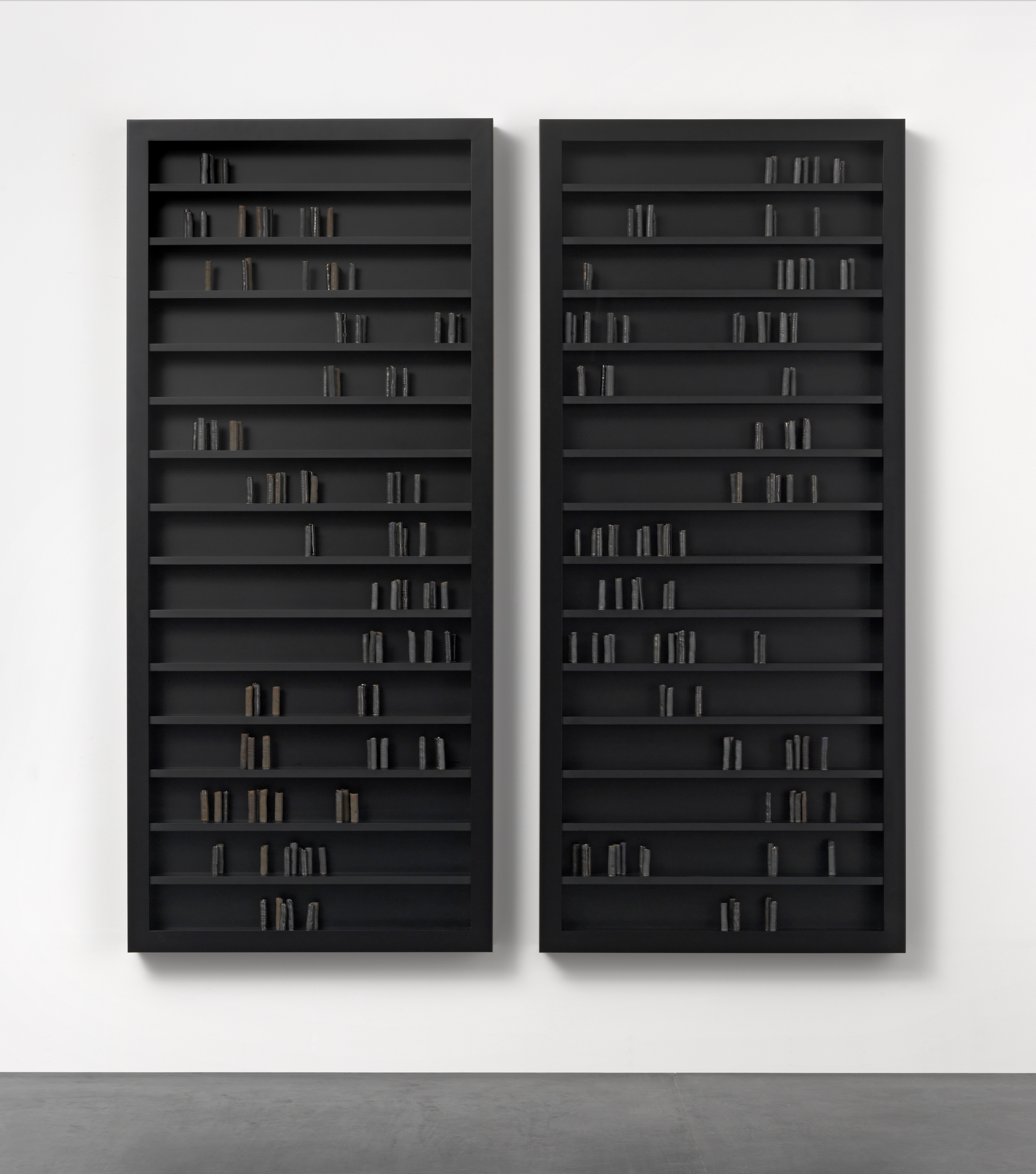
black milk, 2015, in situ at Edmund de Waal's London Studio

Throughout the late 1990s and early 2000s de Waal's ceramic practice became heavily influenced by modernism, the Bauhaus movement in particular. This led to de Waal's belief that the East and West may meet in the materiality of porcelain; for example, the ethos of China's Song dynasty may encounter the modernist ethos of the Bauhaus.

In the years since 2000 de Waal has moved away from making and exhibiting single domestic use vessels to the production of groups of vessels and objects to be viewed in relation to openings and spaces, later moving into predominately wall-mounted and freestanding vitrines filled with varying multitudes of his porcelain vessels, and most recently the addition of different kinds of metals, metallic gilding, porcelain shards and sheets of porcelain with embossed handwriting. In a 2017 interview conducted in preparation for de Waal's exhibition at Artipelag, Sweden, de Waal explained his artistic process and attraction to porcelain as a material:

when I need to make something I'm often mesmerised or haunted by an idea or by a piece of poetry. A line from poetry, a word sometimes, or a piece of music, or a space that I've been thinking about, a particular place that I want to kind of question by making something for it. So, there are all these different possibilities when I begin. I am grounded in history, the history and culture of the materials I use, this extraordinary two-thousand-year history of porcelain. I don't use this material lightly. It’s not a light material. It's got incredible resonance, incredible power.

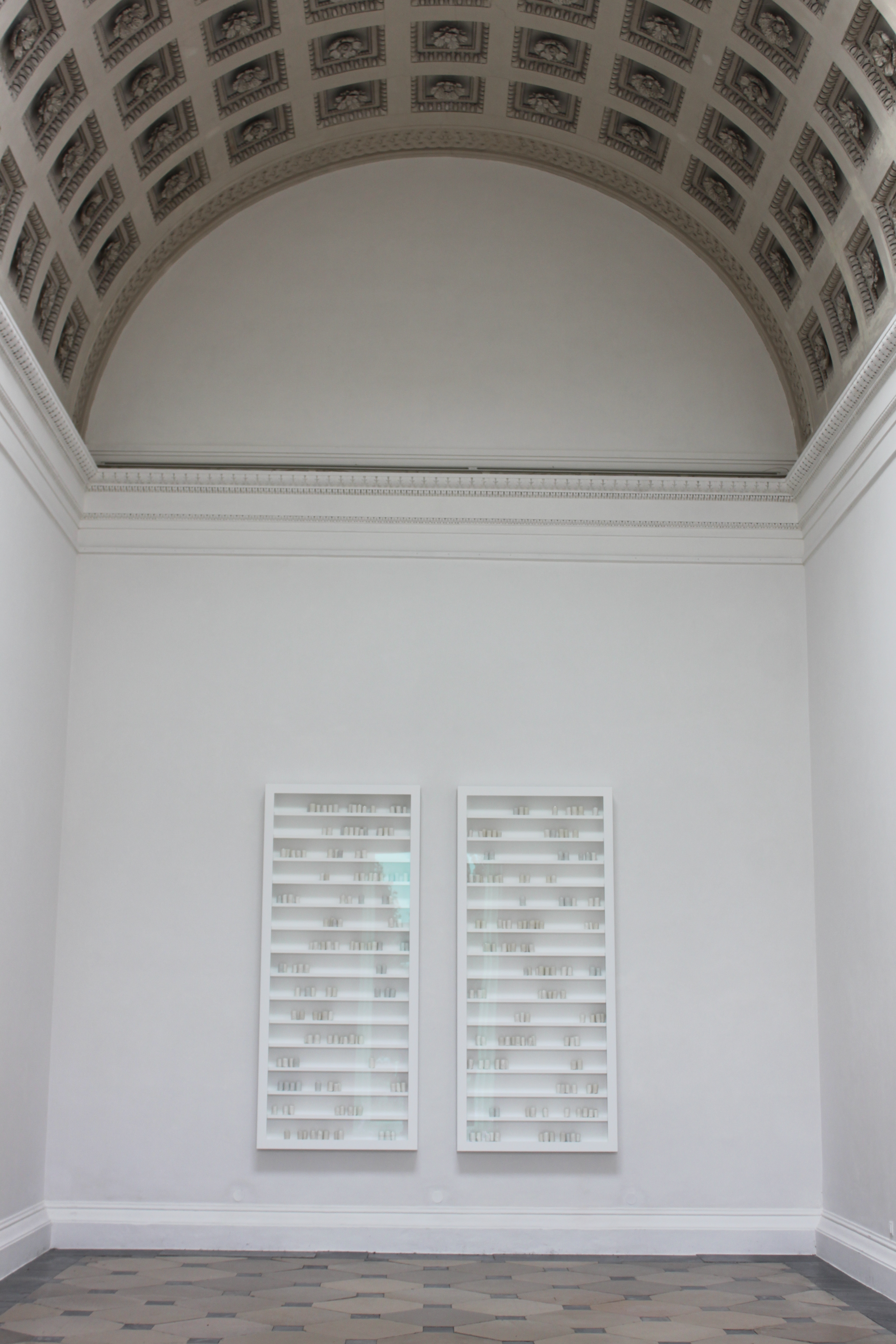
Lichtzwang, 2014. Installed in the Theseus Temple, Vienna.

In 2013 BBC One broadcast an Imagine documentary following de Waal for a year as he prepared for his debut New York exhibition, Atemwende at Gagosian Gallery; titled and inspired by a poetry collection from the German émigré poet Paul Celan.

De Waal discussed the influence of music and sound on his art practice in various interviews, including the BBC Radio 3 programme Private Passions, BBC Desert Island Discs and in a 2017 interview, de Waal mentioned, "I am obviously on some spectrum where for me objects do actually have very powerful sound. I do literally hear them when I put them out." In addition, de Waal plays recorded music aloud in his studio while making and assembling his work, that this provides "a landscape for [him] to be in" when working. De Waal has collaborated with musicians on various projects, including Psalm, in 2015 by the Scottish composer Martin Suckling with the Aurora Orchestra; and an atmospheric sound piece by Simon Fisher Turner as a part of the 2017 Schindler House exhibition.

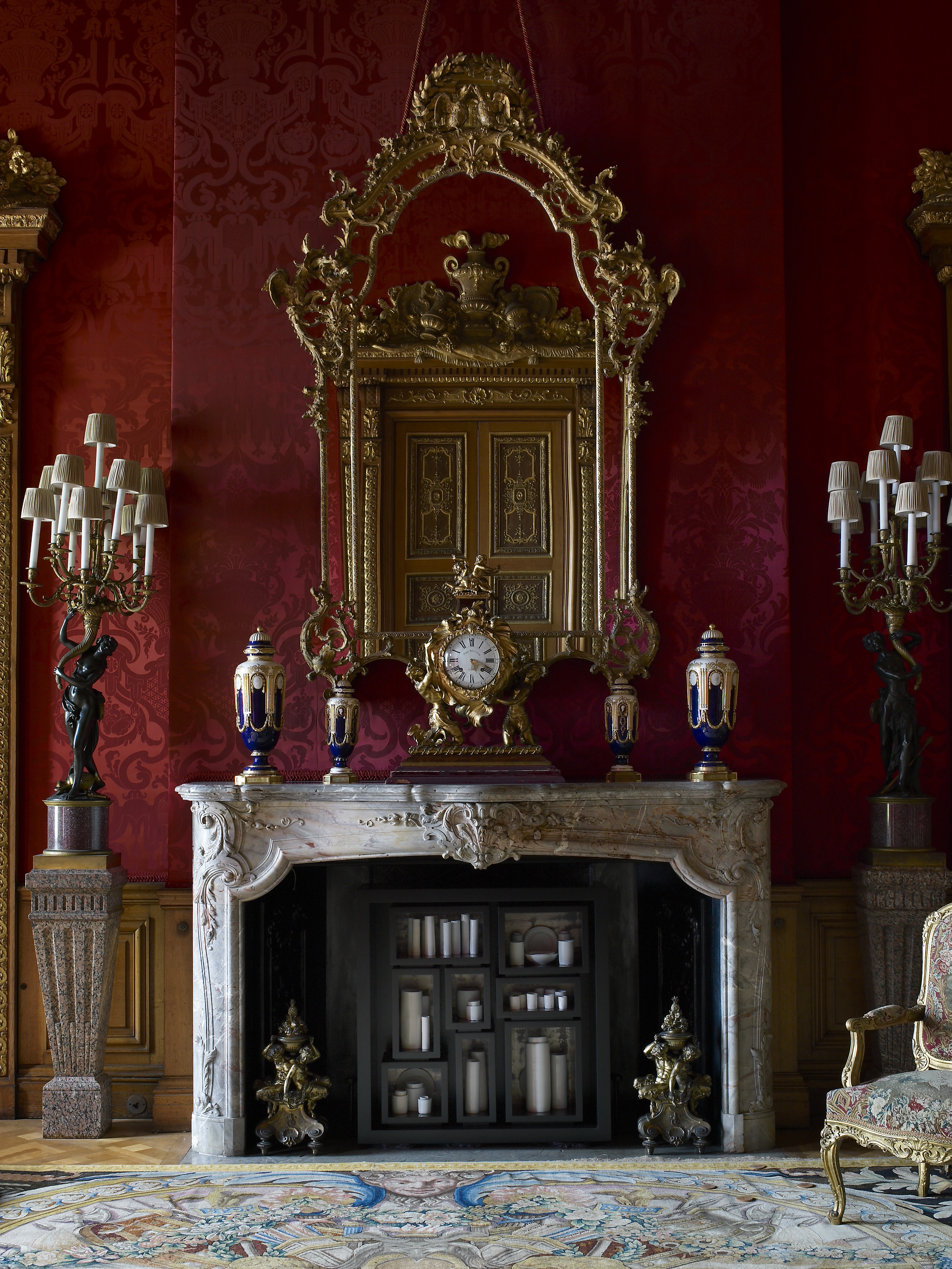
on the properties of fire, 2012. Installed at Waddesdon Manor, Buckinghamshire.

De Waal has exhibited major installations at Chatsworth, Kettle's Yard, Tate Britain, Fitzwilliam Museum, Southwark Cathedral, Kunsthistorisches Museum (including a commission for the Theseus Temple in the Volksgarten, Vienna), and the Victoria and Albert Museum.

In 2012 he received his first outdoor public art commission, for the Alison Richard Building at the Sidgwick Site of the University of Cambridge, where he created A Local History, consisting of three vitrines filled with porcelain to sit beneath the pavement surrounding the building. In 2015 de Waal curated the exhibition White in the Royal Academy of Arts Library and Print Room. The "project ... sets objects in dialogue with one another and with the spaces around them" and included works by Ai Weiwei, Kazimir Malevich's Suprematist Teapot and J. M. W. Turner's porcelain palette. In September 2016 de Waal collaborated with the artist Ai Weiwei to co-curate an exhibition, Kneaded Knowledge: The Language of Ceramics at the National Gallery in Prague and Kunsthaus Graz exploring the history of clay. The exhibition featured works by both artists and from other prominent artists working in ceramics, including Pablo Picasso, Lucio Fontana, Isamu Noguchi, Lucie Rie and Peter Voulkos.

Since 2016 de Waal has continued his interest in working with arts and cultural institutions in installing his work in relationship and dialogue with existing museum collections such as the Frick Collection, historical architectural spaces such as Schindler House and the Ateneo Veneto; and engagement with Jewish museums in both Venice and Vienna. De Waal make his Royal Ballet debut in the 2017–18 Season designing Wayne McGregor’s new ballet, Yugen, at the Royal Opera House. Set to The Chichester Psalms, the production formed part of a programme celebrating the centenary of Leonard Bernstein's birth.

De Waal is a patron of Paintings in Hospitals, a charity providing art for health and social care in England, Wales and Northern Ireland, and from 2015 to 2020 de Waal was a trustee of the National Saturday Club, an educational charity for young people. In 2018, de Waal was re-appointed to the Royal Mint Advisory Committee for another term of five years. From 2004 to 2011, de Waal was professor of Ceramics at the University of Westminster; and a trustee of the Victoria & Albert Museum, London from 2011 to 2019. De Waal has been a trustee of the Gilbert Trust since 2013 and in 2020 became a co-opted member of the V&A Museum of Childhood.

== Writing ==
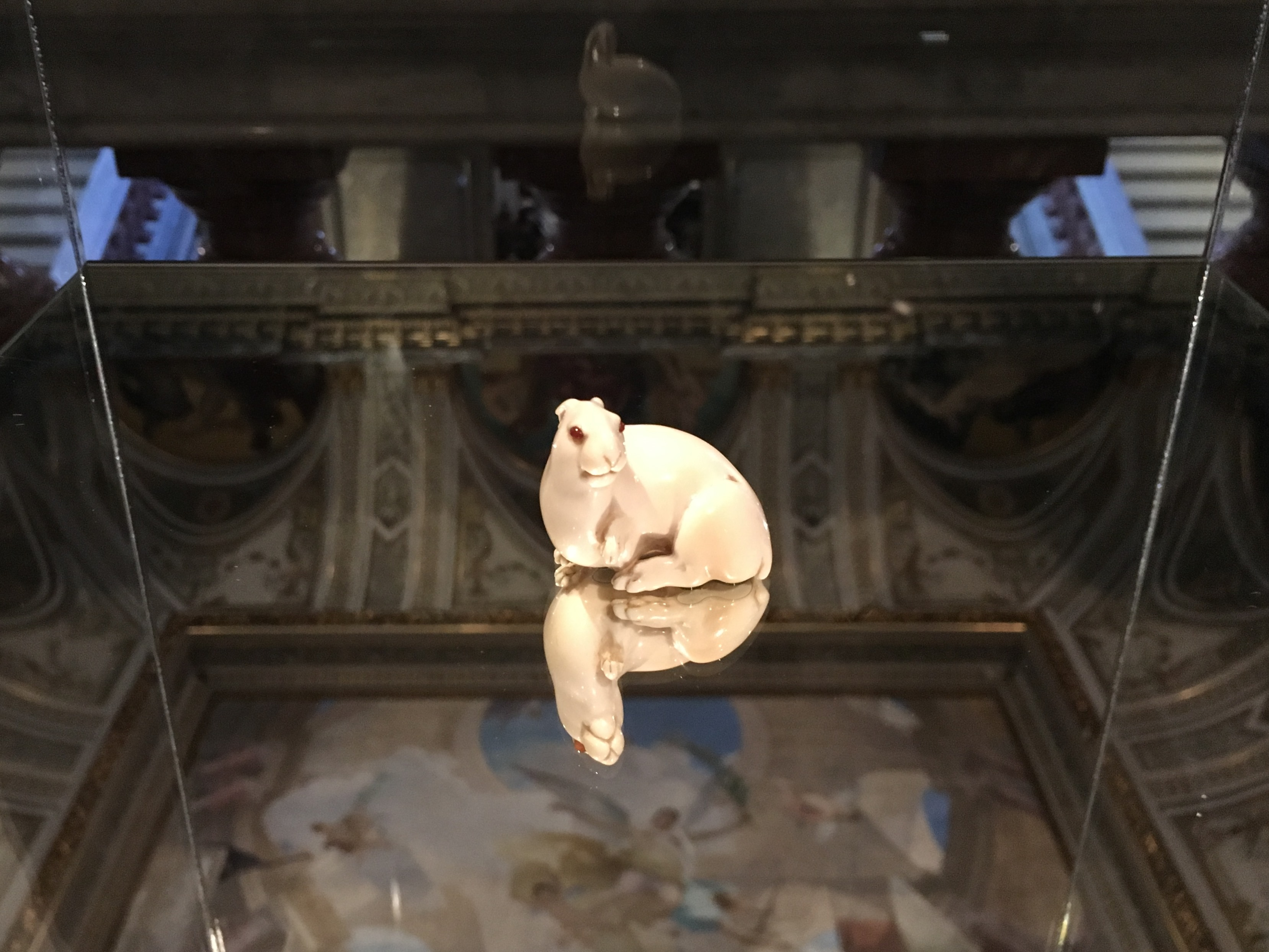
The Hare with Amber Eyes. Netsuke. Masatoshi, Osaka, c. 1880, signed. Ivory, amber buffalo horn. Former Ephrussi Collection, today descendant Edmund de Waal. Shown at a special exhibition in November 2016 with De Waal at the Kunsthistorisches Museum, Vienna.

In 1998, De Waal published a monograph on Bernard Leach, with research collected while studying in Japan. The book challenges the public understanding of Leach as the great and original interlocutor for Japan and the East as the 20th-century potter who translated the mystery of the East to audiences in the West. De Waal's research into Leach in Japan revealed that he predominantly associated himself with Western-educated Japanese people, did not speak Japanese and studied only a narrow range of traditional Japanese ceramics. Due to Leach's status in the West as the "Father of British studio ceramics" and the influence of his Eastern techniques and philosophy, De Waal's views attracted criticism from some of Leach's followers.

In 2010, de Waal's family memoir, The Hare with Amber Eyes: a Hidden Inheritance, was published, first by Chatto & Windus in the UK and later by Farrar, Straus and Giroux in New York City. The book traces the history of de Waal's Jewish relatives (from his paternal grandmother, Elisabeth), the wealthy and influential Ephrussi family, by telling stories surrounding a collection of 264 Japanese netsuke – miniature ivory and wood sculptures traditionally used as toggles on men's kimono, to attach carrying pouches. The collection of netsuke were originally purchased by Charles Ephrussi in Paris in the 1870s, and were handed down through the generations and eventually given to de Waal by his great-uncle Ignace "Iggie" Ephrussi, who settled in Tokyo after the Second World War. The book received critical acclaim, and brought de Waal the Costa Book Award for biography in 2010, as well as the Galaxy New Writer of the Year Book Award and the Royal Society of Literature's Ondaatje Prize. It has sold over a million copies and has been published in more than 25 languages.

The Ephrussis. Travel in Time, an exhibition surrounding the story of the Ephrussi family told by de Waal in his family memoir The Hare with Amber Eyes, tracing their history from Odessa to Paris and Vienna; then to their migration as refugees as the Second World War forced them to seek asylum in the United Kingdom, the US and Mexico, and onto Japan and other countries, opened at the Jewish Museum Vienna in November 2019.

De Waal's second book, The White Road, was published by Chatto & Windus in 2015 and was aired on BBC Radio 4's Book of the Week. It follows de Waal's journey to discover the history of porcelain, from porcelain first made in the hills of Jingdezhen in China to the first makers of English porcelain, William Cookworthy and Josiah Wedgwood; and the development of porcelain manufacture in Dresden in the early 18th century during the reign of Augustus the Strong, ruler of Saxony, by Johann Friedrich Böttger and Ehrenfried Walther von Tschirnhaus and later in Nazi Germany the porcelain manufacture Allach, a project by Heinrich Himmler, run by the SS with forced labour provided by the Dachau concentration camp.

De Waal's third book, Letters to Camondo, was published by Chatto & Windus in May 2021.

De Waal's fourth book is How to Begin (Chatto & Windus, 2026).

== Major exhibitions and installations ==
- 1995: Edmund de Waal. Egg, London.
- 1999: Modern Home. High Cross House, Dartington Hall, Devon.
- 2002: Porcelain Room. Geffrye Museum, London.
- 2002: A Long Line West. Egg, London.
- 2005: Arcanum: mapping 18th-Century European porcelain. National Museums and Galleries of Wales, Cardiff.
- 2005: A line around a shadow. Blackwell, Bowness-on-Windermere, Cumbria.
- 2006: Vessel, perhaps. Millgate Museum, Newark-on-Trent, Nottinghamshire.
- 2007 Edmund de Waal at Kettle's Yard, MIMA and elsewhere. Kettle's Yard, Cambridge, Middlesbrough Institute of Modern Art.
- 2007: A Sounding Line. Chatsworth House, Derbyshire.
- 2009: Signs & Wonders. Victoria and Albert Museum, London.
- 2010: From Zero. Alan Cristea Gallery (now known as Cristea Roberts Gallery), London.
- 2012: Edmund de Waal at Waddesdon. Waddesdon Manor, Buckinghamshire.
- 2012: a local history. Alison Richard Building, University of Cambridge.
- 2012: a thousand hours. Alan Cristea Gallery (now known as Cristea Roberts Gallery), London.
- 2013: On White: Porcelain stories from the Fitzwilliam Museum. Fitzwilliam Museum, Cambridge.
- 2013: Atemwende. Gagosian Gallery, New York.
- 2014: atmosphere. Turner Contemporary, Margate.
- 2014: another hour. Southwark Cathedral, London.
- 2014: Lichtzwang. Theseus Temple, Vienna.
- 2015: wavespeech. A joint exhibition with David Ward. Pier Arts Centre, Orkney.
- 2015: white: A Project by Edmund de Waal. Royal Academy of Arts, London.
- 2016: ten thousand things. Gagosian Gallery, Beverley Hills.
- 2016: Irrkunst. Galerie Max Hetzler, Berlin.
- 2016: Kneaded Knowledge with Ai Weiwei. Kunsthaus Graz, Graz.
- 2016: During the Night. Kunsthistorisches Museum, Vienna.
- 2017: Lettres de Londres. Espace Muraille, Geneva.
- 2017: Morandi / Edmund de Waal. Artipelag, Stockholm.
- 2018: white island. Museu d’Art Contemporani d’Eivissa, Ibiza.
- 2018: – one way or other – Schindler House, Los Angeles.
- 2018: the poems of our climate, Gagosian Gallery, San Francisco.
- 2019: breath. Ivory Press, Madrid.
- 2019: psalm. Museo Ebraico di Venezia and Ateneo Veneto, Venice.
- 2019: Elective Affinities. The Frick Collection, New York.
- 2019: a sort of speech. Galerie Max Hetzler, Berlin.
- 2019: im Goldhaus. Porzellansammlung, Staatliche Kunstsammlungen, Dresden.
- 2019: Library of Exile. Japanisches Palais, Staatliche Kunstsammlungen, Dresden.
- 2020: Library of Exile. The British Museum, London.
- 2020: some winter pots. Gagosian Gallery, London.
- 2020: tacet. New Art Centre, Salisbury.
- 2020: cold mountain clay. Gagosian Gallery, Hong Kong.
- 2021: This Living Hand: Edmund de Waal presents Henry Moore. Henry Moore Studios & Gardens, Perry Green.
- 2021–2022: Hare With Amber Eyes. Jewish Museum (Manhattan), New York.
- 2022–2023: de Waal +. Gagosian Book Shop, Burlington Arcade, London.
- 2023: this must be the place. Gagosian Gallery, New York.
- 2024: Library of Exile. Warburg Institute, London.
- 2025: The Eight Directions of the Wind. The Huntington, San Marino, California.

== Awards and honours ==
- 1991–1993 Daiwa Anglo-Japanese Foundation Scholarship.
- 1996: Fellow of Royal Society of Arts.
- 1999–2001: The Leverhulme Trust Special Research Fellowship.
- 2003: Silver Medal, World Ceramic Exposition, Korea.
- 2009: Honorary Fellow, Trinity Hall, University of Cambridge.
- 2011: Honorary degree from the University for the Creative Arts.
- 2011: Costa Book Awards, winner (Biography), The Hare with Amber Eyes.
- 2011: Royal Society of Literature Ondaatje Prize, winner, The Hare with Amber Eyes.
- 2011: Order of the British Empire (OBE) for Service to the Arts.
- 2011: to present, Trustee of the Victoria and Albert Museum, London.
- 2012: Senior Fellowship Royal College of Art, London.
- 2013: Honorary Doctorate of Letters University of Sheffield.
- 2013: Honorary Doctorate University of the Arts, London.
- 2014: Honorary Doctorate Canterbury Christ Church University.
- 2014: Honorary Doctorate, University of Nottingham.
- 2015: Windham–Campbell Literature Prize for Non-Fiction.
- 2016: Honorary Doctorate, University of York.
- 2017: London Craft Week Medal.
- 2019: Harman/Eisner Artist in Residence at the Aspen Institute Arts Program.
- 2021: Fellow of the Royal Society of Literature.

De Waal was appointed Officer of the Order of the British Empire (OBE) in the 2011 Birthday Honours for services to art, and promoted to Commander of the Order of the British Empire (CBE) in the 2021 Birthday Honours for services to the arts.

== Bibliography ==
=== Books ===
- Bernard Leach. London: Tate Publishing. 1998. ISBN 978-1-849760430
- Design Sourcebook: Ceramics. London: New Holland Publishers. 1999. ISBN 9781780091334
- 20th Century Ceramics. London: Thames and Hudson. 2003. ISBN 978-0-500203712
- Rethinking Bernard Leach: Studio Pottery and Contemporary Ceramics, with Kenji Kaneko. Kyoto: Shibunkaku Publishing. 2007. ISBN 9784784213597
- The Hare with Amber Eyes: a hidden inheritance. London / New York: Chatto & Windus / Farrar, Straus & Giroux. 2010. ISBN 978-0099539551
- The Pot Book. with Claudia Clare: London: Phaidon Press. 2011. ISBN 978-0-714847993
- Edmund de Waal. London: Phaidon Press. 2014. ISBN 978-0-714867038
- The White Road. London / New York: Chatto & Windus / Farrar, Straus & Giroux. 2015. ISBN 978-0-701187705
- Letters to Camondo. London: Chatto & Windus. 2021. ISBN 9781784744311
- How to Begin. London:Chatto & Windus. 2026. ISBN 9781784746704

=== Catalogues ===
- elective affinities. New York, USA. The Frick Collection. 2019. ISBN 9780912114774
- breath. Madrid, Spain. Ivorypress. 2019.
- wavespeech. Bath, UK: Wunderkammer Press. 2018. ISBN 978-0-9935511-1-6
- Edmund de Waal / Morandi. Stockholm, Sweden: Artipelag. 2017. ISBN 978-91-980428-9-4
- Kneaded Knowledge. Cologne, Austria: Universalmuseum Joanneum, Graz. 2016. ISBN 978-3-96098-031-5
- During the Night. Vienna, Austria: Kunsthistorisches Museum. 2016. ISBN 978-3-99020-122-0
- Irrkunst. Berlin, Germany: Galerie Max Hetzler. 2016. ISBN 978-3-935567-88-6
- ten thousand things. Beverly Hills, CA: Gagosian Gallery. 2016. ISBN 978-0-8478-4926-0
- atmosphere. Margate, UK: Turner Contemporary. 2014. ISBN 978-1938748011
- Atemwende. New York: Gagosian Gallery. 2013. ISBN 978-1935263852
- a thousand hours. London: Alan Cristea Gallery. 2012.
- Edmund de Waal at Waddesdon Manor. Buckinghamshire: Waddesdon. 2012.
- From Zero. London: Alan Cristea Gallery. 2010.
- Signs & Wonders. London: Victoria & Albert Museum. 2009.
- Edmund de Waal at Kettle's Yard, MIMA and elsewhere. Cambridge / Middlesbrough Institute of Modern Art, Middlesbrough: Kettle’s Yard. 2007.
- Arcanum: mapping 18th-century European porcelain. Cardiff: National Museums and Galleries of Wales. 2005.
- Edmund de Waal: A line around a shadow. Bowness-on-Windemere: Blackwell House: The Arts & Crafts House. 2005.
- A Secret History of Clay: From Gauguin to Gormley. Liverpool: Tate. 2004.
- Modern Home. Dartington Hall, Devon: High Cross House. 1999.

== Television appearances ==
- What Do Artists Do All Day?
- "Make Pots or Die" Imagine (TV series)
