= Nicola Beauman =

British publisher (b. 1944)

Nicola Beauman OBE, Hon. FRSL
- Born: Nicola Mann; 20 June 1944 (age 82)
- Education: Newnham College, Cambridge
- Occupation: Publisher
- Known for: Founder of Persephone Books
- Parent(s): Eleanore Ehrlich and F. A. Mann

Nicola Beauman OBE (née Mann; born 20 June 1944) is a British biographer and journalist, and the founder of Persephone Books, an independent book publisher based in Bath, England.

== Early life and education ==
She was born, as Nicola Mann, on 20 June 1944 into a Jewish family and had two older siblings – Richard David Mann (1935–2012) and Jessica Mann (1937–2018). Her parents, both of whom left Nazi Germany in 1933 to come to Britain, were Eleanore Ehrlich (1907–1980), a lawyer and judge, and her husband F. A. Mann (1907–1991), an international lawyer. She grew up in London and attended St Paul's Girls' School before studying English at Newnham College, Cambridge.

== Career ==
Beauman brought attention to middle-class women writers with her 1983 survey A Very Great Profession: The Woman's Novel, 1914–39. Her research showed how literary representations of female domesticity could challenge social assumptions. Much of Beauman's later writing has been literary biography. In 2022, Beauman was elected an Honorary Fellow of the Royal Society of Literature.

== Persephone Books ==
Beauman's Persephone Books is a publishing house that mainly publishes female authors. It was founded in 1998 as a mail-order publisher, and sales are mostly made online. In May 2021 the company's retail shop moved from Bloomsbury in London to Bath.

According to The Guardian, Beauman founded Persephone Books to publish 'forgotten' novels by women, many of which she had written about in A Very Great Profession: The Woman's Novel 1914–39, originally published by Virago in 1983 and reissued in 2008 by Persephone Books. Most Persephone books come in a uniform grey cover, which Beauman sees as 'a guarantee of a good read', and contain endpapers that use patterns or prints from the year in which the book was first published.

In an interview with journalist Leonie Cooper, Beauman said that when she first started the press things were hard: "We had a lot of books piling up in the warehouse, but then we got a bestseller, which was phenomenally lucky." That bestseller was Miss Pettigrew Lives for a Day by Winifred Watson, which Persephone Books published in 2000 and which has been made into a film starring Frances McDormand. Since then Persephone Books has continued to publish several books a year, and currently has 152 titles in print, including novels by Dorothy Whipple, Virginia Woolf, R. C. Sherriff, Katherine Mansfield, and E. M. Delafield.

== Publications ==
- A Very Great Profession: The Woman's Novel, 1914–39, London: Virago, 1983: reissued by Persephone Books, 2008.
- Cynthia Asquith (biography), London: Hamish Hamilton, 1987.
- Morgan: A Biography of the Novelist E. M. Forster, London: Hodder and Stoughton, 1993; New York: Knopf, 1994.
- The Other Elizabeth Taylor, London: Persephone Books, 1993.

== Personal and family life ==
She was married, first, to the architect Nicholas Lacey, with whom she had three children: the children's author Josh Lacey, the events organiser Olivia Lacey and the conductor William Lacey.

In 1983, she married the economist Christopher Beauman (who was previously married to Sally Beauman, née Kinsey-Miles). She has two children with him: Francesca Beauman, who is editorial director of Persephone Books, and the novelist, journalist and screenwriter Ned Beauman.
