= Grk =

Grk or GRK may refer to:

- Grk, Serbia, a village located in the municipality of Šid, Serbia
- G protein-coupled receptor kinase, a family of protein kinases within the AGC group of kinases
- Green Rock Energy, an Australian energy company
- Grk Bijeli, a white grape variety used for wine
- Grk book series, a series of children's books written by Josh Lacey under the pseudonym Joshua Doder
- Hellenic languages, the branch of the Indo-European language family whose principal member is Greek
- Royal Gendarmerie of Cambodia, the national gendarmerie force of the Kingdom of Cambodia
- Killeen Regional Airport, a small military/commercial joint-use airport that operates alongside Robert Gray Army Airfield in Texas, United States
  - Robert Gray Army Airfield, a military joint-use airport that operates alongside Killeen Regional Airport in Texas, United States
- Berliet GRK, a range of heavy-duty trucks
