= Elisabeth de Waal =

Austrian writer

- Born: Vienna, Austria
- Occupations: Poet, writer
- Spouse: Hendrik de Waal
- Writing career
- Language: English, German

Elisabeth de Waal (1899–1991), née von Ephrussi, was an Austrian writer born in Vienna. De Waal's works include The Exiles Return.

== Biography ==
De Waal, born Elisabeth von Ephrussi, was a member of the Ephrussi family, the eldest child of Viktor von Ephrussi and Baroness Emmy Schey von Koromla.

De Waal studied philosophy, law, and economics at the University of Vienna and completed her doctorate in 1923. De Waal was a poet and corresponded with Rainer Maria Rilke about poetry. She also exchanged letters with philosopher Eric Voegelin, both of them having been Rockefeller Foundation fellows at Columbia University. After marrying Hendrik de Waal, she lived in Paris and Switzerland before settling down in Tunbridge Wells.

== Writing ==
De Waal wrote five novels in her lifetime, "two in German and three in English." The only one published was The Exiles Return which was released posthumously when her grandson, the artist and writer Edmund de Waal, brought it to the attention of publishers. The novel follows three Austrian exiles returning to Austria in 1954. A New York Times review by Andrew Ervin wrote, "De Waal brings these characters together in a tightly wound story of love, betrayal and class tension among Austria's aristocratic, clerical and intellectual spheres. If the plot can seem a bit like a PBS costume drama waiting to happen, so does De Waal's personal history."

Edmund de Waal introduced the novel at the Austrian Cultural Institute in London. He observed that it "was not a melancholic occasion. It was a powerful affirmation of how stories can survive and find audiences." Persephone Books released an issue of The Exiles Return which donates proceeds to the Refugee Center with every copy.

== Works ==
- The Exiles Return (Reprinted by Persephone Books in 2013)
- Milton Place (Reprinted by Persephone Books in 2019)
