= Ania Dykczak =

Polish television presenter (born 1977)

- Born: 1977 (age 48–49)
- Other name: Anna Piwowarska
- Occupations: Actor, writer, presenter, historian, radio presenter, children's presenter, television presenter
- Years active: 2000s–present

Ania Dykczak, also known as Anna Piwowarska (born 1977) is a historian and television presenter, living in London, England and Warsaw, Poland. She speaks and writes in Polish and English.

== Career ==
Dykczak went to Cambridge University, earning a degree in English Literature. During her time at university she met and worked with Fran Beauman. Together, they helped form the "Crazy Horse Theatre Company", which won several awards including The Guardian International Student Drama Award. She and Beauman went into television, writing and presenting programmes for both adults and children, such as the Five series Heroes of History and CBBC's Bring It On.

Dykczak currently lives in Warsaw where she works as a writer and producer in radio, film and television.
