= Jessica Mann =

English novelist (1938–2018)

Jessica Mann (13 September 1937 – 10 July 2018) was a British writer and novelist. She also wrote several non-fiction books, including Out of Harm's Way, an account of the overseas evacuation of children from Britain in World War II.

== Biography ==
Mann was born in London, the daughter of jurist F. A. Mann and Eleanore Ehrlich. Her siblings included publisher Nicola Beauman.

She was educated at St Paul's Girls' School and Newnham College, Cambridge, where she read Archaeology and Anglo-Saxon Studies, graduating in 1959. and the University of Leicester, from which she had a degree in Law. She wrote features, comment and reviews for the Literary Review magazine, The Daily Telegraph, The Sunday Telegraph, Western Morning News, House & Garden and other publications. She appeared on television programmes such as Question Time and represented the South West on radio's Round Britain Quiz. As a novelist, she specialised in the mystery and suspense genres; her 22 novels were published from 1971 to 2016.

Mann lived near Truro in Cornwall and was married to the archaeologist and historian Charles Thomas until he died in 2016. The couple married a week after Mann completed her Cambridge finals in 1959, and had two sons and two daughters.

== Books ==
- A Charitable End (1971)
- Mrs Knox's Profession (1972)
- The Only Security (1973)
- The Sticking Place (1974)
- Captive Audience (1975)
- The Eighth Deadly Sin (1976)
- The Sting of Death (1978)
- Deadlier than the Male (non-fiction, 1981)
- Funeral Sites (1981)
- No Man's Island (1983)
- Grave Goods (1985)
- A Kind of Healthy Grave (1986)
- Death Beyond the Nile (1988)
- Faith Hope and Homicide (1991)
- Telling Only Lies (1992)
- A Private Inquiry (1996)
- Hanging Fire (1997)
- The Survivor’s Revenge (1998)
- Under a Dark Sun (2000)
- The Voice from the Grave (2002)
- Out of Harm's Way (non-fiction, 2005)
- The Mystery Writer (2006)
- Godrevy Light (non-fiction with Charles Thomas, 2009, Twelveheads Press ISBN 9780906294703)
- The Fifties Mystique (non-fiction, 2012, Quartet Books) (2nd edition, 2013, The Cornovia Press ISBN 9781908878076)
- Dead Woman Walking (2013, The Cornovia Press ISBN 9781908878069)
