= Persephone Books =

British independent book publisher

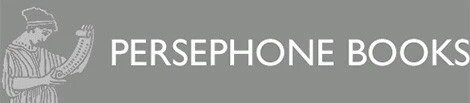
- Founded: 1999; 27 years ago
- Founder: Nicola Beauman
- Country of origin: United Kingdom
- Headquarters location: Bath, Somerset
- Key people: Francesca Beauman (Managing Director)
- Publication types: Largely-neglected fiction and non-fiction, mostly by women writers
- Official website: www.persephonebooks.co.uk

Persephone Books is an independent publisher based in Bath, England. Founded in 1999 by Nicola Beauman, Persephone Books reprints works largely by women writers of the late 19th and 20th century, though a few books by men are included. The catalogue includes fiction (novels and short stories) and non-fiction (diaries, memoirs and cookery books). Most books have a grey dustjacket and endpaper using a contemporaneous design, with a matching bookmark.

The company sells books mostly through its website, but also maintains a shop in Bath.

== History ==
Persephone Books was founded as a mail-order publisher in the spring of 1999 by writer Nicola Beauman, after she received a small inheritance from her father, the jurist F. A. Mann. Beauman named the company Persephone after the Greek goddess connected with spring who is "both 'victim and mistress'". Beauman wanted to upend the devaluing of women writers in literary culture and to restore previously lost works to the canon. She was inspired by Virago Press, which had published her first book A Very Great Profession: The Woman's Novel 1914–39, and its commitment to reprinting lost classics of women's literature.

The company's first offices were in Clerkenwell, London. Sales at first were modest, but its 2000 reprint of Miss Pettigrew Lives for a Day, the publisher's 21st book, became a bestseller with over 100,000 sales by 2012. The success of Miss Pettigrew allowed the company to set up a new shop in Lamb's Conduit Street in Bloomsbury, where it remained for two decades. In May 2021 the Bloomsbury shop was closed and the company moved to Edgar Buildings in Bath.

== Publications ==
Most of Persephone's publications are issued in a uniform grey colour, with endpapers that reproduce prints or patterns from the year of the book's first printing. For example, the They Knew Mr. Knight endpapers represent an industrial town in dark colours, reflecting the theme of the title. Each book is typeset in ITC Baskerville. The design was inspired by the simplicity of 1930s Penguin Books and the design of French publications.

Most titles in the catalogue were written by women in the early or mid-20th century and focus on representations of the home in a genre sometimes called domestic feminism. In this way, Persephone combines both modernism and feminist literature. The catalogue is described as containing "the type of books where very quiet things happen in very dramatic ways to perfectly normal people without anyone thinking twice about it." In some cases, the publisher has actually adopted the label of "middlebrow" for combining both a literary sensitivity and a desire for driving plot in its book selections. Books on cooking, memoirs, and collected letters are also included.

Persephone Books also publishes the Persephone Biannually (once the Persephone Quarterly) magazine for subscribers, which includes articles on its newest publications. A monthly email The Persephone Letter keeps readers up to date on literary events at the Edgar Buildings in Bath, as well as on current theatre productions, exhibitions, relevant newspaper articles and obituaries of authors and of revolutionary women such as Mary Quant and Beverley Lawrence Beech.

== Authors ==
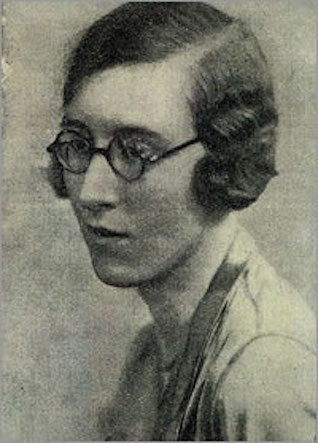
Barbara Noble

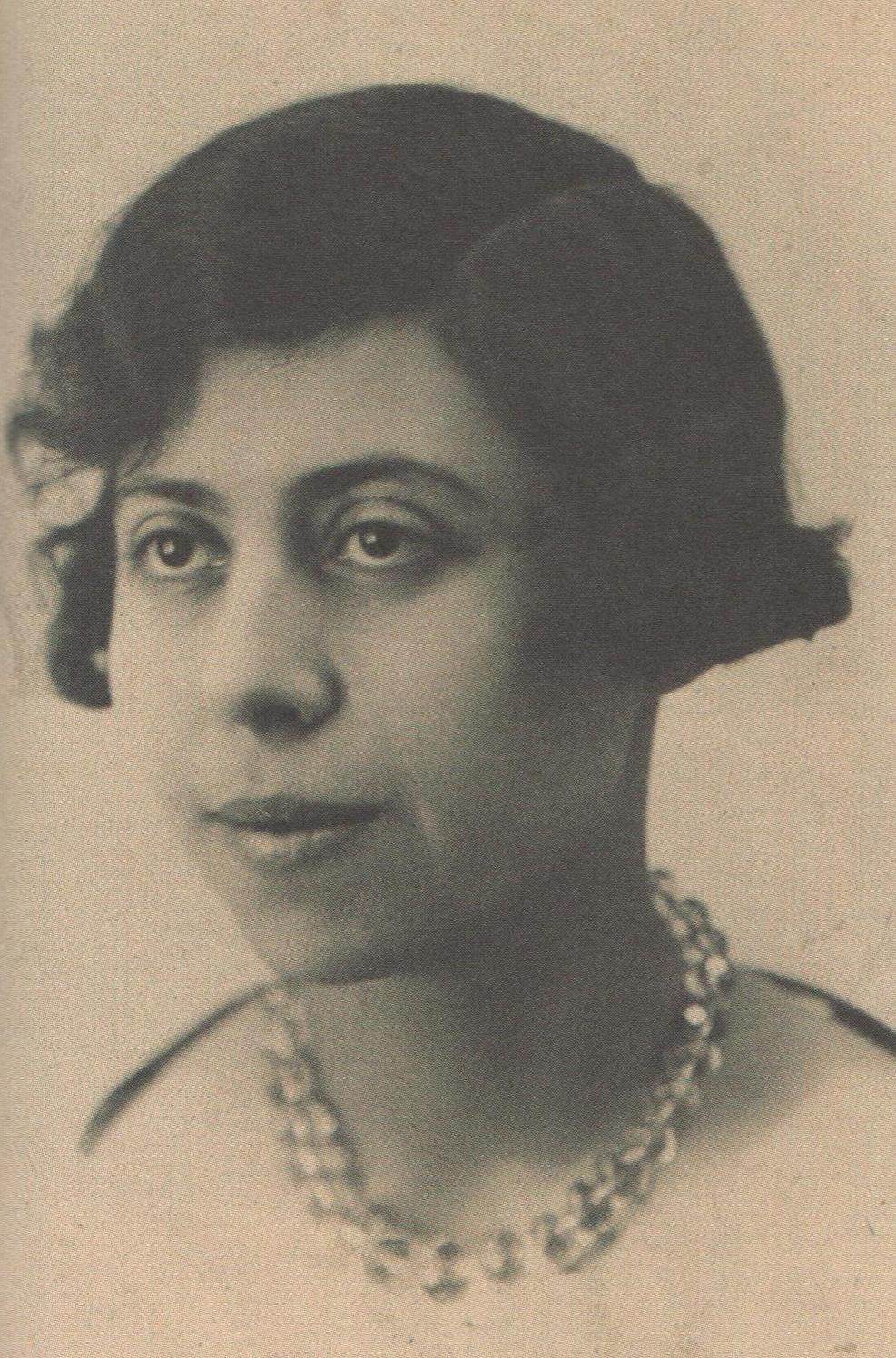
Irène Némirovsky

Authors published by Persephone Books include:

- Ruth Adam
- Rose Allatini
- Elizabeth von Arnim
- Helen Ashton
- Diana Athill
- Enid Bagnold
- Hilda Bernstein
- Elizabeth Berridge
- Margaret Bonham
- Frances Hodgson Burnett
- Elizabeth Cambridge
- Joanna Cannan
- Sally Carson
- Lydia Chukovskaya
- Arthur Hugh Clough
- John Coates
- Wilkie Collins
- Duff Cooper
- Lettice Cooper
- Richmal Crompton
- Stella Martin Currey
- E. M. Delafield
- Monica Dickens
- Isobel English
- Rachel Ferguson
- Ruby Ferguson
- Adam Fergusson
- Lion Feuchtwanger
- Dorothy Canfield Fisher
- Theodor Fontane
- Edith Henrietta Fowler
- E. M. Forster
- Diana Gardner
- Tirzah Garwood
- Eugenia Ginzburg
- Susan Glaspell
- Anna Gmeyner
- Eleanor Graham
- Gwethalyn Graham
- Virginia Graham
- Patience Gray
- Beth Gutcheon
- Cicely Hamilton
- Elizabeth Anna Hart
- Ambrose Heath
- Jane Hervey
- Etty Hillesum
- Vere Hodgson
- Elisabeth Sanxay Holding
- Thea Holme
- Winifred Holtby
- Norah Hoult
- Dorothy B. Hughes
- Molly Hughes
- Helen Hull
- Gladys Huntington
- Robin Hyde
- Siân James
- Agnes Jekyll
- Elizabeth Jenkins
- Marghanita Laski
- Amy Levy
- Madeline Linford
- Christine Longford
- Denis Mackail
- Oriel Malet
- Katherine Mansfield
- Constance Maud
- Georges, Vicomte de Mauduit
- F. M. Mayor
- Jacqueline Mesnil-Amar
- Susan Miles
- Betty Miller
- John Moore
- Penelope Mortimer
- Nicholas Mosley
- Rosalind Murray
- Elizabeth Myers
- Barbara Noble
- Irène Némirovsky
- Mrs Oliphant
- Mollie Panter-Downes
- Winifred Peck
- Jocelyn Playfair
- Amber Reeves
- Maud Pember Reeves
- Judith Rossner
- Maria Eliza Rundell
- R. C. Sherriff
- Kay Smallshaw
- Emma Smith
- Jonathan Smith
- D. E. Stevenson
- Julia Strachey
- Noel Streatfeild
- Muriel Stuart
- Helen Thomas
- Barbara Euphan Todd
- Frances Towers
- Diana Tutton
- Judith Viorst
- Elisabeth de Waal
- Sylvia Townsend Warner
- Winifred Watson
- Dorothy Whipple
- Malachi Whitaker
- Florence White
- Ethel Wilson
- Mathilde Wolff-Mönckeberg
- Leonard Woolf
- Virginia Woolf
- Lucy H. Yates
- Edith Ayrton Zangwill

== See also ==
- Feminist bookstores
- Domesticity
- British women's literature of World War I
