= Viktor von Ephrussi =

Austrian private banker

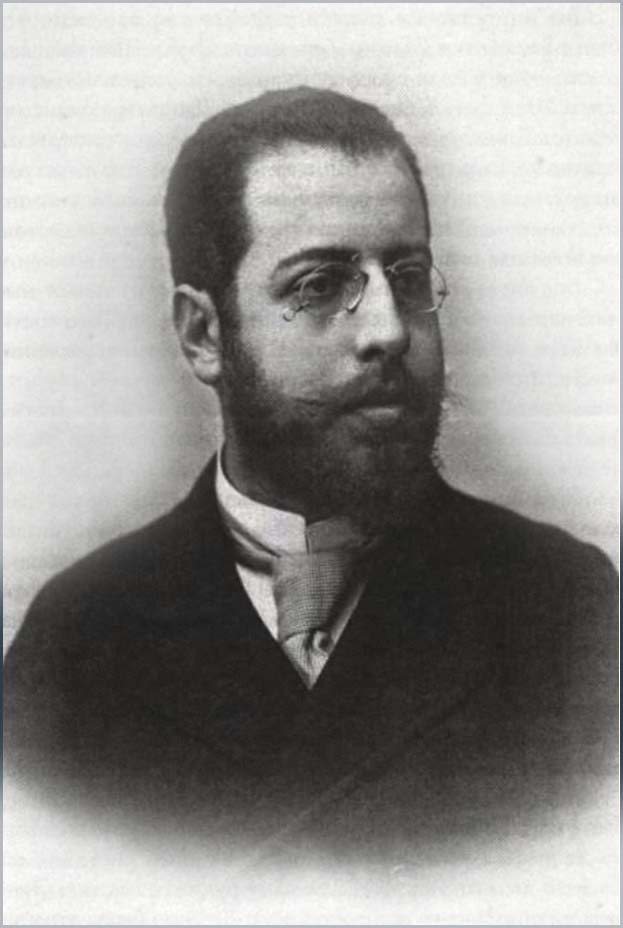

Viktor, Ritter von Ephrussi (born 8 November 1860 in Odessa; died 6 February 1945 in Tunbridge Wells) was an Austrian banker.

== Itinerary ==
Viktor von Ephrussi was the heir of the Ephrussi & Co. bank in Vienna, Austria, founded by his father, Ignaz von Ephrussi. Viktor was made a knight (Ritter) by the Emperor of Austria in 1872, at the same time as his father, too, was knighted.

On 7 March 1899, in Vienna, he married Baroness Emmy Henriette Schey von Koromla (1879-1938), from a family linked to the Rothschilds. The couple had four children:

- Elisabeth (1899-1991) (Mrs. Henri de Waal)
- Gisela (1904-1985) (Mrs. Alfredo Bauer)
- Ignaz "Iggie" Leo Karl (1906-1994)
- Rudolf (1918- New York, 1971).

Viktor von Ephrussi lived in the Ephrussi Palace, at 14 Dr. Karl Lueger-Ring (renamed the Universitätsring in 2012) in Vienna (Austria).

In 1920–1923, Viktor was nearly ruined by severe inflation.

== Nazi persecution ==
In May 1938, he was robbed of all his property by the Nazis who had just annexed Austria: his palace, its art collections, as well as the Ephrussi bank were "Aryanised".

Ruined and threatened with deportation, he first took refuge in Slovakia in his country house in Kövesces, where his wife died, then, before the advance of the Nazis, with his daughter Elisabeth in the United Kingdom in 1938, and died in Tunbridge Wells (Kent) in 1945.

Her children left Vienna in the 1920s. Elisabeth was the first woman doctor of letters in Austria and then moved to the United States at the time of the Anschluss. Gisela left for Madrid in 1925. Ignaz-Iggie became a fashion designer in Paris before moving to America as well, enlisting as a military intelligence agent and then exporting cereals to Tokyo.

== Legacy ==
His great-grandson Edmund de Waal wrote a best-seller about the fate of his family under the Nazis, The Hare with Amber Eyes. The event reunited the family which had been dispersed in the world by the Nazis.

== See also ==
- Ephrussi family
- Aryanization
- The Hare with Amber Eyes
- The Holocaust in Austria
