= Barbara Noble =

English publisher and novelist

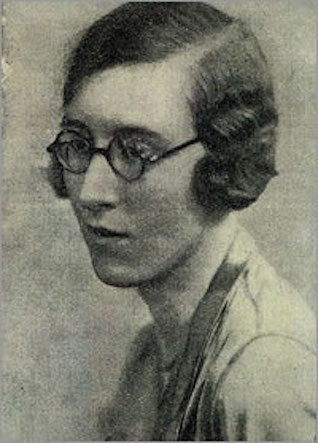
- Born: 1 January 1907; North London, England
- Died: 8 February 2001 (aged 94); England
- Occupations: Publisher, author

Barbara Noble (1 January 1907 – 8 February 2001) was an English publisher and author. She wrote 6 novels of her own, and as head of the London office of Doubleday was instrumental in the publication of thousands of others.

== Life ==
Barbara Noble was born on 1 January 1907 in North London. In 1914, the family moved to Brighton, where she was taught at home by her mother. She grew up wanting to be a writer but her first novel, The Years that Take the Best Away was rejected by 13 publishers. It was finally published by Heinemann when she was 22 and was a great critical success. Her second novel, The Wave Breaks came out in 1932 and she moved to London.

After attending secretarial college, she joined 20th Century Fox. Her first role was as a typist, but she quickly became a script reader. In 1935 she published her third novel, Down by the Salley Gardens, the story of Adrian Dishart, a young man who falls in love with Mrs Holden, a woman fifteen years his senior. One review at the time of release said "the quietness with which the tale moves is curiously compelling. One seems to be involved in the relations of these people to each other without the usual reader's excitement or distaste... Tiresome, true, real people! I don't want to see them again, but that may be a tribute to their reality and Miss Noble's art."

By 1939, Noble had been promoted to the role of London story editor for 20th Century Fox, buying and negotiating film rights for production. In 1943, her fourth novel The House Opposite was published, and in 1946, her fifth, Doreen. It was the story of a child evacuee, torn between two class worlds, one with her charwoman mother in London and another with a middle-class, evacuee 'parents'. It was hugely topical for the time and a "subtle and disturbing examination of the class anxieties permeating wartime Britain." A review in The Spectator called it "a gentle, serious story in which...the author's argument is scrupulously fair; she is observant, sensitive and intelligent."

Noble's last novel, Another Man's Life, was released the year before she became a book editor. It was the story of the lonely and depressed Simon Hart, who after an attempted suicide off the Thames Bridge takes up the life of his drowned rescuer. The theme of suicide sat badly with some reviewers, with the Saturday Review saying it was a "novel which misses the tragedy but plumbs the dreariness and futility of attempted self-destruction... one wonders cruelly if Simon might not have been better left at the bottom of the river."

In 1953, after 20 years with 20th Century Fox, Barbara Noble took up the role as the UK editor for the American publishing house, Doubleday. She replaced Winifred Nerney as the head of the all female staffed, London based office which handled the publication of British authors into the US market. During her time as the London-based editor, Doubleday was publishing authors like Margery Allingham, Daphne de Maurier, Edith Pargeter and Ruth Rendell. She was one of a number of editors who famously turned down William Golding's Lord of the Flies.

Barbara Noble retired from Doubleday in 1973, but she continued to work as a freelance editor for the publishing house for many years. She died on February 8, 2001, aged 94.

== Works ==
=== Novels ===
- The Years that Take the Best Away (1929)
- The Wave Breaks (1932)
- Down by the Salley Gardens (1935)
- The House Opposite (1943) (Reprinted by Dean Street Press in 2019)
- Doreen (1946) (Reprinted by Persephone Books in 2005)
- Another Man's Life (1952)
