= Claudia Clare =

British ceramicist and writer

Claudia Clare is a British ceramicist and writer known for her large painted earthenware jars depicting the impact of big events in the lives of ordinary women.

== Career ==
Clare trained as a painter at Camberwell School of Art, apprenticed with Winchcombe pottery and gained a Phd at University of Westminster in 2007.

She has written for Ceramic Review exhibited in galleries and museums including alongside Grayson Perry at the Zuleika Gallery.

She has been described as a subversive ceramicist and is the author of ‘Subversive Ceramics,’ (Bloomsbury 2016). Clare co-wrote ‘The Pot Book’ (Phaidon, 2011) with artist Edmund de Waal.

In 2023 she was involved in a controversy around an invitation to talk at University of The Arts London, The university later apologised
