= Miss Pettigrew Lives for a Day =

2008 film by Bharat Nalluri

- Theatrical release poster
- Directed by: Bharat Nalluri
- Written by: David Magee; Simon Beaufoy
- Based on: Miss Pettigrew Lives for a Day by Winifred Watson
- Produced by: Nellie Bellflower; Stephen Garrett
- Starring: Frances McDormand; Amy Adams; Lee Pace; Ciarán Hinds; Shirley Henderson; Mark Strong
- Cinematography: John de Borman
- Edited by: Barney Pilling
- Music by: Paul Englishby
- Distributed by: Focus Features (United States); Momentum Pictures (United Kingdom)
- Release dates: 7 March 2008 (United States); 15 August 2008 (United Kingdom)
- Running time: 91 minutes
- Countries: United Kingdom; United States
- Language: English
- Box office: $16.7 million

Miss Pettigrew Lives for a Day is a 2008 romantic comedy film directed by Bharat Nalluri, starring Frances McDormand and Amy Adams. The screenplay by David Magee and Simon Beaufoy is based on the 1938 novel of the same name by Winifred Watson.

== Plot ==
In London just prior to World War II, Guinevere Pettigrew, a middle-aged, straitlaced vicar's daughter and governess, has just been dismissed from her fourth job, without her wages, because of her unconventional notions of child rearing. On her way to an employment agency, she collides with a man who tells her that he has just been released from prison; she flees, leaving her suitcase behind with all her belongings. Now destitute, Guinevere heads to a soup kitchen. In an adjoining alley, she sees a man and a woman kissing; the woman realises she is being observed, and is not pleased.

At the agency, Miss Holt tells Guinevere that she is unable to find her another post. Desperate, Guinevere steals from Miss Holt’s desk a business card of the flamboyant American singer-actress Delysia Lafosse. She heads to the address on the card, unaware that Delysia is looking for a social secretary rather than a governess.

Arriving at a luxurious apartment, Guinevere discovers that Delysia is involved with three men: the devoted but penniless pianist Michael Pardue, coincidentally the man she had collided with earlier; the young theatre impresario Phil Goldman who may cast Delysia in the lead role in a West End play; and her financial patron, the wealthy but controlling Nick Calderelli who owns the nightclub where she is performing. Guinevere helps Delysia juggle men and logistics to keep each unaware of the others.

Guinevere’s first challenge is to get Phil out of Delysia’s bed and eliminate traces of their previous night’s debauchery in 20 minutes before Nick arrives. When Nick questions why there is a forgotten cigar in an ashtray, Guinevere puts the cigar in her mouth and declares it to be hers, winning Delysia’s gratitude. Guinevere finds herself swept up into the world of high society, where she must constantly adjust to morals conflicting with her strict upbringing.

At a fashion show, Guinevere meets and is attracted to top lingerie designer Joe Blomfield, who is currently engaged to the show's host, Edythe Dubarry. Guinevere recognizes Edythe as the woman from the tryst in the alley, but says nothing. Edythe, too, recalls the incident, and reacts with hostility. Judging Guinevere’s appearance to be shabby, Delysia takes Guinevere for a makeover and buys her clothes befitting her social secretary.

Michael rebukes Delysia for rejecting a grand romantic gesture that he could ill-afford — a proposal aboard a private boat on the Thames, complete with Dom Pérignon champagne. When Delysia did not turn up, Michael drank the champagne himself and got into a drunken altercation, resulting in a 30-day prison sentence. Now, he presents her with an ultimatum: she must give up the other two men and sail with him to New York tomorrow, or he will depart without her. Delysia remains torn between the lavish lifestyle provided by Nick and earnest love with Michael.

At a party that evening, at which Delysia’s casting in Phil’s play is announced, Michael storms off. Joe has broken off his engagement to Edythe, and Edythe mistakenly blames Guinevere.

Later, at Nick’s nightclub, Joe and Edythe reconcile. Joe asks Guinevere to dance and recognizes her as the woman he met at the fashion show before her makeover. When Delysia agrees to sing, Michael plays "If I Didn’t Care", singing along in an emotional duet. During an air raid drill, Guinevere tells Delysia that her fiancé had died in the last war, cautioning her to avoid regrets.

When Delysia attempts to leave with Michael, Nick intervenes. Michael punches Nick, impressing Delysia. She asks Michael to marry her. Joe follows Guinevere and they share details of people they had lost in the war. Edythe appears, accuses Guinevere of telling Joe about the man she had kissed in the alley, and spitefully discloses Guinevere’s poverty. Guinevere walks out into the night. Joe denies that Guinevere gossiped, and having now learned from Edythe herself about her involvement with another man, once again breaks off their engagement.

Delysia and Michael sail for New York aboard the Queen Mary. Joe, who has been looking for Guinevere all night, finds her at Victoria Station. They leave the station together, arm in arm.

== Cast ==
- Frances McDormand as Guinevere Pettigrew
- Amy Adams as Delysia Lafosse
- Lee Pace as Michael Pardue
- Tom Payne as Phil Goldman
- Mark Strong as Nick Calderelli
- Shirley Henderson as Edythe Dubarry
- Ciarán Hinds as Joe Blomfield
- Christina Cole as Charlotte Warren
- Stephanie Cole as Miss Holt

== Production ==
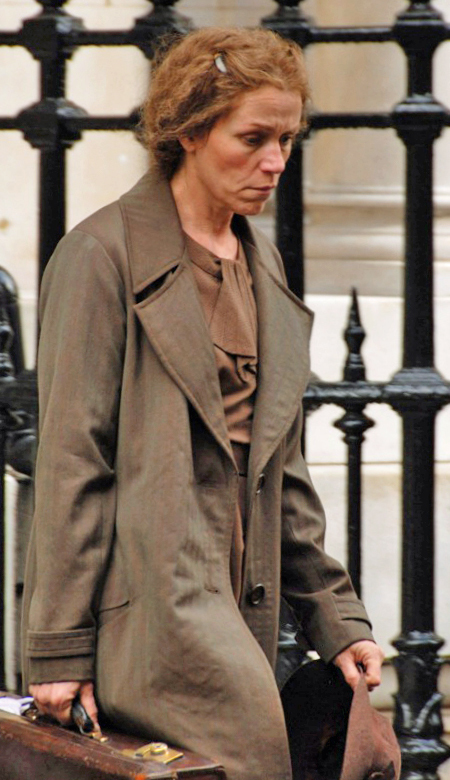
Frances McDormand on location in May 2007.

In Miss Pettigrew's Long Trip to Hollywood, a bonus feature on the film's DVD release, Keith Pickering, the son of the author of the original book, Winifred Watson, reveals his mother first sold the film rights to Universal Pictures in 1939. Within the next few years, the studio developed it as a musical to star Billie Burke in the title role but, just before filming was scheduled to begin, Japan bombed Pearl Harbor and the project was shelved.

In 1954, Universal renewed the rights, but the property remained undeveloped. When London producer Stephen Garrett discovered the book, he sought out American producer Nellie Bellflower, who had just produced the seven-time Oscar-nominated film Finding Neverland for Harvey Weinstein.

Garrett proposed a partnership to get it set up. Bellflower brought the adaptation to executives at Focus Features, but she learned the rights still belonged to Universal, which as the parent company of Focus, allowed them to proceed with the project. Filming locations included the Theatre Royal, Drury Lane in Covent Garden, Whitehall Court in Westminster, and Pimlico. Interiors were shot in the Ealing Studios.

== Critical reception ==
As of June 2020, the film holds a 77% approval rating on the review aggregator Rotten Tomatoes, based on 150 reviews with an average rating of 6.7 out of 10. The website's critics consensus reads: "Miss Pettigrew is a breezy period comedy carried by the strong performances of Amy Adams and Frances McDormand." On Metacritic, the film has an average score of 63 out of 100, based on 27 reviews.

Stephen Holden of The New York Times called the film "an example of how a little nothing of a story can be inflated into a little something of a movie with perfect casting, dexterous tonal manipulation and an astute eye and ear for detail." He praised Amy Adams, saying the "screen magic" she displays "hasn't been this intense since the heyday of Jean Arthur", and he noted that Frances McDormand achieved her "metamorphosis from glum stoicism to demure radiance with impressive comic understatement."

In the San Francisco Chronicle, Ruthe Stein called the film "a swell adaptation" and added, "Frothy and exuberantly entertaining – in part because of the sexual innuendoes – it's the best romantic comedy so far this year ... Director Bharat Nalluri gives Miss Pettigrew Lives for a Day the patina of a film actually made in the 1930s."

Todd McCarthy of Variety said of the actors, "McDormand's performance slowly builds a solid integrity, and contrasts well with Adams' more flamboyant turn, which initially accentuates Delysia's constant role playing but eventually flowers into a gratifyingly full-fledged portrayal of a woman with a past she wishes to escape. Hinds puts real feeling into his work."

== Box office ==
In its opening weekend in the United States and Canada, the film earned $2,490,942 on 535 screens, ranking No. 11 at the box office. It eventually grossed $12,313,694 in the US and Canada and $4,411,239 in other markets for a total worldwide box office of $16,724,933.

== Music ==
The film's score was written and conducted by Paul Englishby, for which he won the ASCAP Award in 2009. Englishby also arranged and conducted three additional songs for the film:

- "Brother, Can You Spare a Dime?"
  - One of the best known American Depression-era songs, it was written in 1930 by lyricist E. Y. "Yip" Harburg and composer Jay Gorney. The song was part of the 1932 musical Americana.
- "T'ain't What You Do (It's the Way That You Do It)"
  - Written by jazz musicians Melvin "Sy" Oliver and James "Trummy" Young. It was first recorded in 1939 by Jimmie Lunceford, Harry James, and Ella Fitzgerald.
- "If I Didn't Care"
  - Written by Jack Lawrence and first recorded by The Ink Spots, featuring Bill Kenny, in 1939.

=== Other songs ===
- "Anything Goes"
  - Written by Cole Porter for his 1934 musical, Anything Goes.
  - A 1935 recording by Lew Stone and His Band, with vocals by The Radio Three (a British close-harmony trio similar to the Boswell Sisters), was featured in the film as Delysia and Miss Pettigrew headed to the fashion show.
- "Dream"
  - Sometimes referred to as "Dream (When You're Feeling Blue)", "Dream" is a jazz and pop standard with words and music written by Johnny Mercer in 1944.
  - Even though the film takes place in 1939, The Pied Pipers' 1945 recording of "Dream" can be heard playing in the background, as if on a radio, as Delysia bathes.
