= Elizabeth Cambridge =

English novelist

Barbara K Hodges (née Webber) (1893–1949) was an English novelist who wrote under the pseudonym Elizabeth Cambridge. The daughter of Dr H. W. Webber, she was born in Rickmansworth in Hertfordshire. She spent her childhood in Plymouth and Westgate-on-Sea, and then attended Les Marrioniers finishing school in Paris. Barbara published her first set of short stories at the age of 17.

In 1914, she worked as a Voluntary Aid Detachment nurse before marrying Dr. G. M. Hodges. The couple lived in Deddington and had two sons and a daughter, one of whom Henry W. M. Hodges . In 1930 she began writing again and Hostages to Fortune was published in 1933 (reprinted in 2003 by Persephone Books). She wrote five more novels between 1934 and 1940.
