= Josh Lacey =

British writer

Josh Lacey (born 1968 in London), who sometimes uses the pseudonym Joshua Doder, is a British writer. He has written several children's books and one book for adults, God is Brazilian, a biography of Charles Miller, the man who introduced football to Brazil.

Josh Lacey, who was born in London, is the eldest son of the architect Nicholas Lacey and his former wife Nicola Beauman. He has a sister, the events organiser Olivia Lacey, and a brother, the conductor William Lacey.

== Publications ==
=== For children ===
==== Mistifz ====
- The One That Got Away (2009)
- Two Tigers on a String (2009)
- Three Diamonds and a Donkey (2010)

==== Bug Club ====
- The Mystery of the Poisoned Pudding (2011)
- The Mystery of the Missing Finger (2011)

==== Tom Trelawney ====
- The Island Of Thieves (2011)
- The Sultan's Tigers (2013)

==== Dragonsitter ====
The Dragonsitter books are illustrated by Garry Parsons.

- The Dragonsitter (2012) (Note: The Dragonsitter was first published in the UK.)
- The Dragonsitter Takes Off (2013)
- The Dragonsitter's Castle (2013)
- The Dragonsitter's Island (2014)
- The Dragonsitter's Party (2015)
- The Dragonsitter to the Rescue (2016)
- The Dragonsitter: Trick or Treat? (2016)

==== Hope Jones ====
The Hope Jones books are illustrated by Beatriz Castro.

- Hope Jones Saves the World (2020)
- Hope Jones Will Not Eat Meat (2021)

==== Others ====
- Bearkeeper (2008)
- The Robbers (2009)
- The Pet Potato, illustrated by Momoko Abe (2022)

==== Grk ====
Written under the pseudonym Joshua Doder

- A Dog Called Grk (2005)
- Grk and the Pelotti Gang (2006)
- Grk and the Hot Dog Trail (2006)
- Grk: Operation Tortoise (2007)
- Grk Smells a Rat (2008)
- Grk Takes Revenge (2009)
- Grk Down Under (2010)
- Grk and the Phoney Macaroni (2012)

=== For adults ===
- God is Brazilian: Charles Miller, the Man Who Brought Football to Brazil (The History Press, 2005)
