= Kay Smallshaw =

English writer

Kay Smallshaw (1905–1996) was an English writer, known for her work as an editor at Good Housekeeping and her books about home-making. She contributed to The Listener, a weekly magazine published in London and the BBC Light Programme's "Woman's Hour". Her books include How to Run Your Home Without Help (1949, republished by Persephone Books in 2005), Your Home and You: The Practical Encyclopedia for Every Homemaker (1955), and The Housewife's Book of Home Equipment: A Practical Guide to its Choice, Use and Maintenance (1959). In the early 2000s, her work earned renewed recognition in the context of ongoing redefinitions of feminism. In 2005, Andrew O'Hagan wrote "It would appear that the cultural heroes in this area are not the Edwardian ladies who chained themselves to the railings in Parliament Square. Neither are they those determined women who once burnt their bras. On the contrary, they are those, such as Smallshaw, who left their bras to soak in warm soapy water for an hour or so before flat-drying them, then folding them away in a well-dusted drawer, preferably on top of a perfumed drawer liner."
