= Margaret Bonham =

British writer

- Born: London, England
- Occupation: Short story writer
- Spouses: Deryck Bazalgette (m. 1940); Sir Charles Kimber, 3rd Baronet (m. 1950)
- Writing career
- Language: English

Margaret Bonham (1913–1991) was a British short-story writer born in London. Bonham's works include the short story "The English Lesson" and the books The Casino (1948) and The House Across the River (1951).

== Biography ==
Bonham attended Wimbledon High School in London growing up, but would go on to spend most of her lifetime in the countryside.

Bonham was married three times. Her first marriage, to Walter Griffith, ended "disastrously" when she was "very young". Her second marriage was to Deryck Bazalgette, the great-grandson of Sir Joseph Bazalgette. The two met when they both attended the Peace Pledge Union, a pacifist, anti-war organization and as conscientious objectors established a commune in Devon. Bonham gave birth to two children, Cary and Charles. They divorced after the Second World War.

After her divorce from Bazalgette, she married Sir Charles Kimber, 3rd Baronet, another conscientious objector who ran a Devon market garden. Bonham and Kimber met when the secretary of the Labour Party in Totnes was canvassing Devon. The two were said to have shared a love of "rally driving and good living" and lived on "a covered lifeboat on Port Meadow, Oxford". Kimber succeeded to his baronetcy in 1950 and the two moved into a large home in Oxfordshire. The couple had a son and daughter before divorcing in the early 1960s.

After Bonham's third marriage ended in divorce, she moved again to Devon where she remained for the rest of her life. After the death of her and Kimber's son in a car crash, she stopped writing.

== Writing ==
Bonham published the majority of her short-stories in magazines, and had written more than 80 in her lifetime. Fifteen were collected and published as The Casino, her most prominent work.

In her 1949 New York Times review, Hilda Lake writes of The Casino, "This slight volume of entertaining short stories from England reminds us once more that no other nation has mastered the art of soft-pedaled social satire quite as the English have. Miss Bonham's 'Edwardian shadows,' her passionless sluts, deluded spinsters and stodgy practitioners of planned parenthood are always on the verge of being badgered."

Bonham's mystery novel The House Across the River was met with positive reviews, with Vernon Fane of The Sphere calling it 'the work of a trained and unromantic mind which plays with thoughts as other writers play with words.' Sean Fielding called the novel "a most unusual and very-well-written piece of work", and ends the review with the sentiment, "bless Miss Bonham for hours of entertainment"

Following the relative success of this first novel she was encouraged by her publisher to write a second, which she entitled "The Kites of Heaven" (a quote from one of her favourite poems by John Crowe Ransom). However she only completed the first chapter and then abandoned this project. The short story was her genre.

A story "Isobel", which was published in two parts in British and American Housekeeping magazines, was adapted as a TV play and was broadcast on BBC television.

== Legacy ==
Five of Bonham's short stories, "The Horse", "Miss King", "The River", "The Two Mrs. Reeds", and "The Professor's Daughter were read on BBC Radio 4 by Emma Fielding.

The Casino was re-published after Bonham's daughter Cary Bazalgette brought the text into the Persephone Books office. Cary also wrote the preface to this very attractive reprint. In it she gives further details of her mother's life and provides a very perceptive analysis of her lifestyle and its influence on what and how she wrote. Anna Carey of Image called the collection a "collection of witty and acerbic short stories". She added, "Whether Margaret Bonham's subjects are an unconventional new mother or a fledgling writer disappointed with the stolid ordinariness of her own home-life, her writing is cool, wry and touching."

== Works ==
- The Casino (1948)
- The House Across the River (1951)
