= Diana Tutton =

Diana Tutton (1915–1991) was a British novelist whose books focused on women navigating difficult relationships and family situations. Her work has been compared to that of Dodie Smith, and she is considered to be part of a group of 20th century British women writers including Ivy Compton-Burnett, Angela Thirkell, and E. M. Delafield whose work often examines the situation of middle-class women.

== Early life ==
Born Diana Godfrey-Faussett-Osborne, Tutton was the youngest of four daughters, and grew up at Pipe Hill House, Lichfield. She and her sisters received a patchy education at the hands of a governess.

== Second World War ==
Following a wartime marriage to Captain John Tutton, Diana drove a WRVS mobile canteen. She accompanied her husband to Kenya, where she enlisted in the First Aid Nursing Yeomanry. The couple had two daughters, born in 1942 and 1946, after which the family returned to England.

== British Malaya ==
In 1948, Tutton and her family moved to British Malaya for three years, they returned again for a further two years in 1956.

== Literary career ==
Tutton is known for three novels in which women feature as the main characters in families with unusual dynamics. Her best-known book, Guard Your Daughters (1953), is about the five mildly unconventional Harvey sisters, who are growing up in rural England shortly after World War II. With a father who writes detective novels and an emotionally fragile mother, the sisters live a somewhat isolated and over-controlled life and are not adept at navigating society outside the family. As the book opens, the oldest sister has recently married, while four of the sisters, all in their teens, still live at home. The book's narrator is middle sister Morgan, and the tone of her first-person account is warm, nostalgic, and lightly comic, with darker undertones surfacing towards the end as the family dysfunctionality more acutely bears on the girls' future lives. A narrative twist in the final pages upends the reader's expectations.

Parallels in the cast of characters, first-person narration, and some plot elements have led Guard Your Daughters to be frequently compared to Dodie Smith’s I Capture the Castle, published five years earlier. Although hailed by John Betjeman as a fine first book whose excellence lay "beneath its flashing surface," it has more recently been described as a "good children's book" version of Smith's novel. It has also been compared to Jane Austen's Pride and Prejudice, a book that is specifically referenced within the text of Guard Your Daughters. Although it has been much written about in recent years, it was long out of print, until Persephone Books reissued it in 2017. It was a Book of the Month selection of the Franco-British Selection Committee in 1953.

Two of Tutton's books centre on taboo relationships. Mamma (1956) is about Joanna Malling, a middle-aged widow who falls in love with her new son-in-law, a man who is much nearer to her own age than to her daughter's. Despite attraction on both sides, the relationship is never consummated, and Tutton ends her book by having the daughter and son-in-law—who had both been living with Joanna—move away. Even more than with Guard Your Daughters, Tutton takes a story with tragic overtones and treats it on the surface as a social comedy. It was serialized in an abridged version on the BBC programme "Woman's Hour" in 1956, read in ten installments by Jill Balcon.

The Young Ones (1959) is about incest. It focuses on the siblings Ned and Julie, the latter of whom is initially thought to be adopted. Narrated by one of their sisters, it describes Ned and Julie's love affair, which continues even after they discover that Julie is not adopted but is Ned's biological sister. Ned and Julie marry nonetheless and attempt, with the narrator's help, to keep the marriage a secret from their relatives and friends. Ned and Julie's marriage ultimately fails. As in Tutton's other novels, there is a strong contrast between the matter-of-fact narrative style and the unusual subject matter.

== Novels ==
- Guard Your Daughters (1953)
- Mamma (1956)
- The Young Ones (1959)
