= Muriel Stuart (poet) =

British poet (1885–1967)

Muriel Stuart (1885, Norbury, South London – 18 December 1967), born Muriel Stuart Irwin, was a poet, the daughter of a Scottish barrister. She was particularly concerned with the topic of sexual politics, though she first wrote poems about World War I. She later gave up poetry writing; her later publications are on gardening.

She was hailed by Hugh MacDiarmid as the best woman poet of the Scottish Renaissance although she was Scottish only by family origin and lived all her life in England. Despite this, his comment led to her inclusion in many Scottish anthologies. Thomas Hardy described her poetry as "superlatively good".

Like other female poets of her era, she reflects the weight of social expectations on women and the experience of post-war spinsterhood. Her most famous poem, "In the Orchard", is entirely dialogues and in no kind of verse form, which makes it innovative for its time. She does use rhyme: a mixture of half-rhyme and rhyming couplets (a,b,a,b form). Other famous poems of hers are "The Seed Shop", "The Fools" and "Man and his Makers".

She married twice, the second time to the publisher Arthur William Board, by whom she had two children, Nicholas Llewellyn Board and Elizabeth Alerie Stapleforth. Later in life she stopped publishing poetry and wrote books on gardening: Fool’s Garden (1936) was a best-seller and Gardener's Nightcap has been reprinted by Persephone Books.

She died at her home in Lyme Regis, only a month after her husband's death.
