= Jacqueline Mesnil-Amar =

Writer (b. 1909, d. 1987)

- Born: Jacqueline Perquel; 1909; Paris, France
- Died: 1987 (aged 77–78)
- Occupations: Writer, journalist

Jacqueline Mesnil-Amar, also known as Jacqueline Perquel (1909 – 1987) was a Jewish writer from France best known for Ceux qui ne dormaient pas (1957), or Maman, What Are We Called Now?

== Biography ==
Mesnil-Amar was born in the Parisian suburb Passy in 1909 to a wealthy, middle-class family. Her parents were Jules Perquel, a financier and editor, and Ellen Allatini.

She moved to Sorbonne in 1930 and married André Amar, with whom she shared a love of literature, philosophy, and country. They had a daughter, Sylvie. Mesnil-Amar studied literature while André worked at a bank. During the occupation of France, she was involved in the Jewish resistance organization Armée Juive (AJ) by providing funding and also working as a liaison agent. She also wrote a column in the journal Bulletin du Service Central des Déportés Israélites.

After the outbreak of World War II, André joined the Jewish Combat Organization and was arrested in July 1944. Five weeks later, he returned home, having escaped being deported on the last train to Auschwitz. The rest of his family did not escape, and were murdered in Auschwitz.

== Writing ==
When André was held by the Gestapo, Mesnil-Amar began keeping a journal. Her diary, along with several post-war articles were published 1957 under the title Ceux qui ne dormaient pas.

The book was translated into English by Francine Yorke for Persephone Books and published under the title Maman, What Are We Called Now? with a preface by Caroline Moorehead. The English title references the ways Mesnil-Amar and her daughter would have to assume fake names with forged papers during the war. Moorehead writes of Mesnil-Amar, "Looking back over her life, she felt a mixture of regret and contempt for the way that the Jewish families she had grown up among had believed so passionately in their own assimilation, had been so willing to adopt the customs and ape the behaviour of the Catholic and Protestant French, and had thus failed to see how profound the differences were between them, 'by reason of suffering and blood'. They had felt so good and so safe in this 'golden age', even after the advent of Hitler." The Persephone edition also incorporates photographs by Thérèse Bonney.

Anne Garvey, in the Jewish Chronicle, calls it a "perfect piece of written heartbreak".

Mesnil-Amar and her husband devoted their lives after the war to Jewish causes. André founded the Central Service for Jewish Deportees after the war, and Mesnil-Amar wrote articles for and edited their publication. She also wrote for the Journal of the Alliance Israélite Universelle, Nouveaux Cahiers, and delivered lectures on Franz Kafka and Marcel Proust.

The couple were friends with André Spire and Edmond Fleg.

== Works ==
- Ceux qui ne dormaient pas (1957)
- Nous étions les juifs de l'oubli
