= Ambrose Heath =

English journalist and food writer (1891–1969)

- Born: 7 February 1891; Hampstead, London, England
- Died: 31 May 1969 (aged 78); Wotton, Surrey, England
- Occupations: Food writer; journalist

Ambrose Heath (born Francis Geoffrey Miller; 7 February 1891 – 31 May 1969) was an English journalist and food writer. He authored many cookbooks.

== Biography ==
Heath wrote for newspapers including The Times and The Manchester Guardian, before becoming the food writer for The Morning Post. From 1933, when he published four cookery books, Heath wrote and translated more than one hundred works on food, such as Good Food on the Aga (reprinted by Persephone Books in 2003) and The Good Cook in Wartime. He was best known for a translation: Madame Prunier's Fish Cookery Book (1938).

During World War II, rationing was practiced and food writers also embraced the challenge. Heath authored twenty-nine cookbooks between 1939 and 1945, some of which promoted vegetable cookery. During this time there was an involuntary national shift toward vegetarianism and this is reflected in some of Heath's cookbooks. Heath authored Cooking in Wartime (1939), Good Food Without Meat (1940), Making the Most of it (1942), Simple Salads and Salad Dressings (1943) and Vegetables for Victory (1944). Heath was not a vegetarian in his personal life but his book Good Food Without Meat advocated alternatives to red meat and poultry. It was an early pescatarian cookbook as the recipes included fish and eggs.

== Bibliography ==
=== 1930s ===
- Good Food: Month By Month Recipes (1932)
- Good Food on the Aga (1933)
- More Good Food (1933)
- The Book of the Onion (1933; revised edition, 1947)
- Good Savouries (1934)
- Good Potato Dishes (1935)
- Good Soups (1935; enlarged edition 1945)
- Dining Out (1936)
- The National Mark Calendar of Cooking (1936)
- News Chronicle Cookery Book (1936)
- From Garden To Kitchen (1937) (with C. H. Middleton)
- Good Sweets (1937; revised edition, 1947 with title Good Sweets and Ices)
- The Country Life Cookery Book (1937)
- Madame Prunier's Fish Cook Book (editor, 1938)
- Vegetable Dishes and Salads for Every Day of the Year (1938)
- American Dishes for English Tables (1939)
- Cooking in Wartime (1939)
- From Creel to Kitchen. How to Cook Fresh-Water Fish (1939)
- Good Dishes from Tinned Foods (1939)
- Good Drinks (1939)
- Savoury Snacks. A Collection of Recipes, etc. (1939)
- Open Sesame. The Way of a Cook with a Can (1939; reprinted as Good Dishes from Tinned Foods (1943))

=== 1940s ===
- Good Breakfasts (1940)
- Good Fish Dishes (1940)
- Good Food Without Meat (1940)
- Meat Dishes Without Coupons (1940; reprinted as Meat Dishes Without Joints (1941))
- What's Left in the Larder (1940)
- The Good Cook in Wartime (c.1940)
- Good Food Dishes (1940)
- Good Food For Children (1941)
- How to Cook in War Time (1941)
- Kitchen Front Recipes and Hints (1941)
- More Kitchen Front Recipes (1941)
- Two Hundred War Time Recipes (1941)
- Wartime Recipes (1941)
- Cooking for One (1942)
- Good Food in Wartime (1942)
- New Dishes for Old. Food Values and Substitute Recipes (1942)
- There's Time For a Meal (1942)
- Making the Most of It (1942)
- Good Cheese Dishes (1943)
- Simple American Dishes in English Measures (1943)
- Simple Salads and Salad Dressings (1943)
- Vegetables for Victory (1944)
- Good Cold Dishes (1946)
- Good Cooking on Rings (1946)
- Good Jams, Preserves and Pickles (1947)
- Good Sweets and Ices (1947)
- What's Wrong With the Cooking? (1947)
- Good Puddings and Pies (1947)
- Good Cakes, Bread and Biscuits (1948)
- The Book of Sauces (1948)
- Good Salads and Salad Dressings (1949)
- Good Sandwiches and Picnic Dishes (1949)
- Good Vegetables (1949)

=== 1950s ===
- Good Food Again (1950)
- Fare Wisely and Well (1951)
- Good Egg Dishes (1952)
- Pig Curing and Cooking (1952)
- Biscuits and American Cookies (1953)
- Dishes Without Meat (1953)
- Good Poultry and Game Dishes (1953)
- Herbs in the Kitchen (1953)
- Kitchen Table Talk (1953)
- Small Meat Dishes (1953)
- Home-made Wines and Liqueurs (1953)
- The International Cookery Book (1954)
- Children's Party Fare (1954)
- Herrings, Bloaters and Kippers (1954)
- Good Cooking with Yeast (1955)
- Little Cheese Dishes (1955)
- English Cheeses of the North (1956)
- Home Cookery (1956)
- Honey Cookery (1956)
- Soups and Soup Garnishes (1957)
- Casserole and Chafing Dish (1958)
- The Art and Magic of Cookery (1959)

=== 1960s ===
- The Queen Cookery Book (1960)
- The Penguin Book of Sauces (1960)
- Learn to Cook With Pictures (1961)
- Hay Box Cookery (1961)
- Guernsey Tomatoes (1961)
- The Birds Eye Book Of Britain's Favourite Recipes: Book One (1964)
- The Birds Eye Book Of Britain's Favourite Recipes: Book Two (1964)
- Good Food Month By Month Recipes (1965)
- Meat (1968)

=== 1970s ===
- Personal Choice (1971)
- A Menu for all Seasons (1972)
- Delicious Dishes without Meat (Vegetarian Cookery) (1975)
- Biscuits (1976)
- Cheese Dishes (1976)
- Favourite Food from Ambrose Heath: Recipes (1976)

=== Miscellaneous ===
- Introduction to A Butler's Recipe Book by Thomas Newington (1935)
