= Mollie Panter-Downes =

British writer (1906–1997)

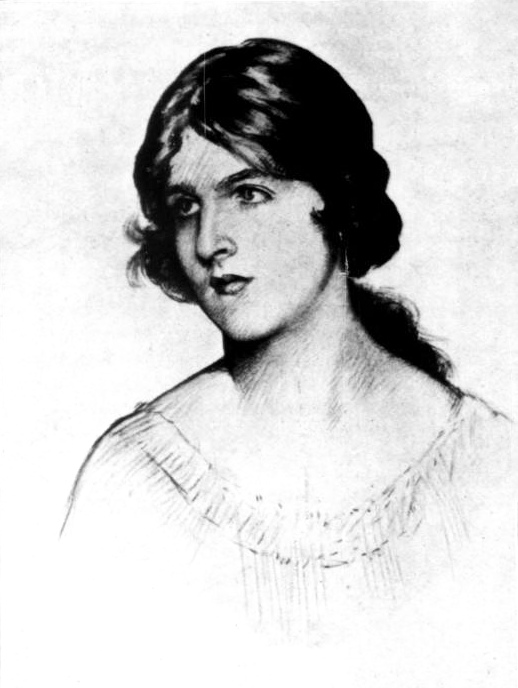
Mollie Panter-Downes

Mary Patricia "Mollie" Panter-Downes (25 August 1906 – 22 January 1997) was a British novelist and columnist for The New Yorker. Aged sixteen, she wrote The Shoreless Sea which became a bestseller and was serialised in The Daily Mirror. Her second novel The Chase was published in 1925.

== Early life and education ==
Panter-Downes was born to Major Edward Martin Panter-Downes (died 1914 at Mons) and Marie Kathleen Cowley, who was of Irish origin. She lived with her mother in Brighton and then a Sussex village without much money.

== Career ==
In 1922, aged sixteen, Panter-Downes wrote The Shoreless Sea which became a bestseller; eight editions were published in 1923 and 1924, and the book was serialised in The Daily Mirror. Her second novel The Chase was published in 1925.

In 1938, Panter-Downes began writing for The New Yorker, first a series of short stories, and from September 1939, a column entitled Letter from London, which she wrote until 1984. The collected columns were later published as Letters from England (1940) and London War Notes (1972).

Panter-Downes visited Ootacamund, in India, and wrote about the town, known to all as Ooty, in her New Yorker columns. This material was later published as Ooty Preserved.

== Personal Life and Death ==
Panter-Downes married Aubrey Clare Robinson (1903–1997) in 1927 and the couple moved to Surrey.

She died in Compton, Surrey, aged 90.

== Publications ==
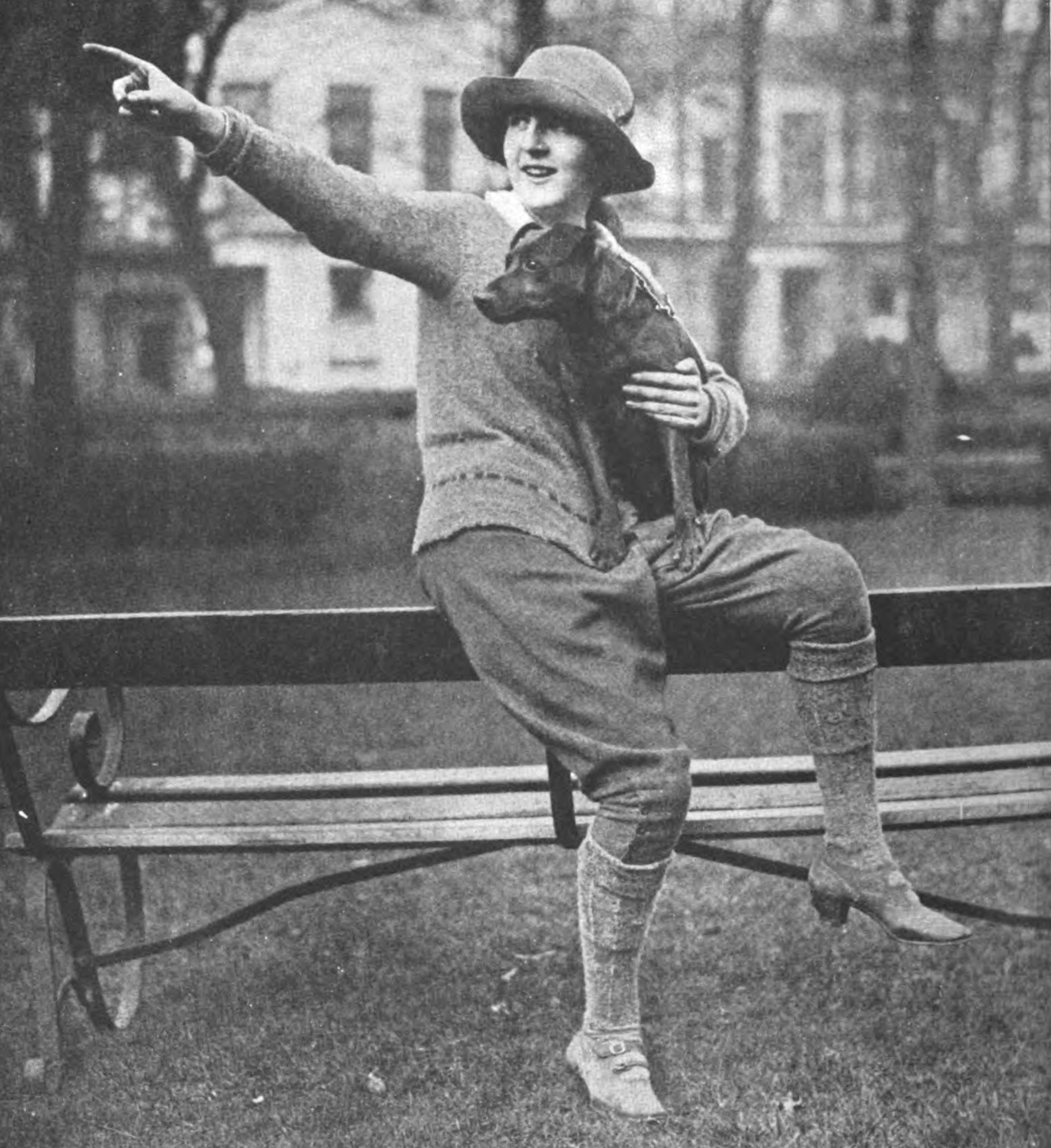
Mollie Panter-Downes in 1924

=== Selected works ===
- The Shoreless Sea (1923)
- The Chase (1925)
- Storm Bird (1929)
- My Husband Simon (1931; published in the U.S. as Nothing in Common But Sex)
- Good Evening, Mrs Craven (short stories written between 1938-1944; republished in 1999 by Persephone Books)
- London War Notes (wartime letters written for The New Yorker; republished in 2014 by Persephone Books)
- One Fine Day (1947)
- Minnie's Room (short stories written between 1947-1965; republished in 2002 by Persephone Books)
- Ooty Preserved: A Victorian Hill Station in India (1967)
- At The Pines (1971; later life of Swinburne)
