= Rachel Ferguson =

English novelist, playwright and journalist

- Born: Rachel Ethelreda Ferguson; 17 October 1892; The Nest, Church Grove, Hampton Wick, England
- Died: 26 November 1957 (aged 65); Kensington, England
- Education: Royal Academy of Dramatic Arts
- Occupations: Journalist, Author

Rachel Ferguson (1892–1957) was an English novelist, playwright and journalist. She wrote twelve novels, three memoirs, four satirical works, two biographies, and one play.

== Life ==
Rachel Ethelreda Ferguson was born on 17 October 1892 at The Nest, Church Grove, Hampton Wick. She was the third child of Robert Norman Ronald Ferguson, a Treasury Clerk, and his wife, Rose Geraldine (née Cumberbatch). Her grandfather was the physician Robert Ferguson. She was educated at home and then sent to a finishing school in Florence, Italy. By the age of 16 she was a fierce campaigner for women's rights and considered herself a suffragist: "I was as militant as authority allowed me to be. I wanted to go to prison but was refused on the score of age." She went on to become a leading member of the Women's Social and Political Union.

In 1911 she became a student at the Royal Academy of Dramatic Art and began a career on the stage, using the name Rachel Verney. She also had a small role in the film The Ring and the Rajah.

When her theatrical career was cut short by the advent of World War I, Ferguson joined the Women's Volunteer Reserve and also took to writing in earnest. She wrote for Punch ("As far as I know, I was the first woman ever to sign her articles"), and was the drama critic for the Sunday Chronicle, writing under the name 'Columbine'. In 1923 she published her first novel, False Goddesses, but it was not until 1931, when she published the absurdist novel The Brontës Went to Woolworths, that she gained national recognition. She subsequently wrote ten more novels.

Ferguson died in Kensington in 1957 at the age of 65.

== Works ==
=== Novels ===
- False Goddesses (1923)
- The Brontës Went to Woolworths (1931) (Reprinted as a Virago Press in 1988 and as part of the Bloomsbury Group in 2009)
- The Stag at Bay (1932)
- Popularity's Wife (1932)
- A Child in the Theatre (1933)
- A Harp in Lowndes Square (1936) (Reprinted by Dean Street Press in 2016)
- Alas, Poor Lady (1937) (Reprinted by Persephone Books in 2006)
- A Footman for the Peacock (1940) (Reprinted by Dean Street Press in 2016)
- Evenfield (1942) (Reprinted by Dean Street Press in 2016)
- The Late Widow Twankey (1943)
- A Stroll Before Sunset (1946)
- Sea Front (1954)

=== Memoir ===
- Passionate Kensington (1939)
- Royal Borough (1950)
- We Were Amused (1958)

=== Satire ===
- Sara Skelton: The Autobiography of a Famous Actress (1929)
- Victorian Bouquet: Lady X Looks On (1931)
- Nymphs and Satires: Humorous Sketches (1932)
- Celebrated Sequels (1934)

=== Biography ===
- Memoirs of a Fir Tree: The Life of Elsa Tannenbaum (1946)
- And Then He Danced: The Life of Espinosa by Himself (1946)

=== Play ===
- Charlotte Brontë: A Play in Three Acts (1933)
