= William Lacey =

British conductor (born 1973)

William Lacey (born 31 August 1973 in London, England) is a British conductor. He is especially known as an opera conductor, having conducted a large number of operas at companies all over the world.

== Education ==
Lacey grew up in Islington, London. His mother is Nicola Beauman, the founder of Persephone Books. His father is the architect Nick Lacey. He attended Winchester College and went on to study at King's College, Cambridge (obtaining a first-class degree in music) and privately with Alfred Brendel and György Kurtág. At Cambridge, he concentrated on Wagner studies with John Deathridge and general musical education with Robin Holloway. He also conducted all of the main Cambridge University orchestras and organised concerts of new music at Kettle's Yard. As a pianist, he attended courses at the Mozarteum in Salzburg and the International Musicians Seminar in Cornwall.

== Career ==
Lacey began his conducting career in 1995, conducting modern operas in London, at Almeida Opera (Almeida Theater) and elsewhere. Following his debut at English National Opera in 1998, he took up the post of Staff Conductor at San Francisco Opera for three years, conducting a wide variety of repertoire and assisting Donald Runnicles, Valery Gergiev and Sir Charles Mackerras.

As a guest conductor, Lacey has conducted at many different opera houses in both the US and Europe, including Houston Grand Opera, Los Angeles Opera, Santa Fe Opera, Washington National Opera, New York City Opera, Canadian Opera Company, the Liceu in Barcelona, Stockholm Royal Opera, Norwegian National Opera, Greek National Opera, Opera North (Leeds) and l'Opéra Comique in Paris. He has conducted four productions with Graham Vick's Birmingham Opera Company, and has collaborated often with stage director Christopher Alden. He is also active as a symphonic conductor, especially in Germany, Austria, Spain and Italy.

In 2010 he was appointed Erster (Koordinierter) Kapellmeister at the Oper Leipzig, where he conducts the Leipzig Gewandhaus Orchestra. He has received much attention recently for his regular performances with Plácido Domingo, including Handel's Tamerlano in Barcelona, Washington, and Los Angeles, and Gluck's Iphigénie en Tauride in Washington.

In 2012 he conducted the world premiere of Jonathan Dove's Life is a Dream, and the first Moscow performances since 1965 of Benjamin Britten's A Midsummer Night's Dream.

== Sources ==
- Christiansen, Rupert. "Birmingham Opera Company's Idomoneo: dazzling theatrical flair". Daily Telegraph (August 19, 2008)
- Los Angeles Opera. "William Lacey, Conductor"
- Santa Fe Opera Performance Archives. Lacey, William
- Smith, Craig (30 June 2006). "Grace Notes: William Lacey". The Santa Fe New Mexican.
