= Miss Pettigrew Lives for a Day (novel) =

1938 novel by Winifred Watson

- US first edition 1939
- Author: Winifred Watson
- Illustrator: Mary Thomson
- Language: English
- Publisher: Methuen & Co
- Publication date: 1938
- Publication place: England
- Media type: Print
- Pages: 233

Miss Pettigrew Lives for a Day is a novel by Winifred Watson, first published in 1938 by Methuen & Co with illustrations by Mary Thomson. A US edition was published in 1939 by D. Appleton-Century Company. In 2008 the novel was adapted into a film of the same name.

== Plot ==
The action takes place during a single day. Guinevere Pettigrew, a straitlaced unsuccessful governess in her late 40s, is facing destitution. Her employment agency arranges an interview with Delysia LaFosse, a nightclub singer and socialite, whom they believe to be looking for a nursery governess though in fact she is seeking a maid. When Miss Pettigrew arrives at the luxury flat at 10 am, she is frantically invited in by Delysia who, without troubling to find out why Miss Pettigrew is there, enlists her help in getting rid of Phil, a lover who has stayed the night. Rising to the occasion, Miss Pettigrew tells Phil she is there to fit Miss LaFosse with new underclothes, and convinces him to leave. Delysia explains that at any moment another lover, Nick Calderelli, who owns the flat, may let himself in. They clear away traces of Phil's presence.

Nick arrives, handsome and dangerous – a man with a cocaine habit whom Delysia finds irresistible in spite of herself. Convinced that Nick is a bad influence, Miss Pettigrew dissuades him from staying by telling him that she is an old friend who will be staying the night. Delysia confides that she is torn between Phil, who is in a position to back her for the lead role in a new show; Nick, who part-owns the nightclub in which she is a singer; and also Michael, a self-made and newly-wealthy man who wants to marry her.

The doorbell rings, announcing Edythe Dubarry, a beauty salon owner. She is desperate for advice, her fiancé Tony having just left her. Immensely impressed with the way in which Miss Pettigrew had dealt with Phil and Nick, Delysia tells her friend that Miss Pettigrew will no doubt also be able to talk Tony round. They dress for a late afternoon party, Delysia lending Miss Pettigrew a gown while Edythe gives her a makeover. At the party, Miss Pettigrew has a little too much to drink, and later frets she was rather rude to Tony, but almost by accident convinces him to reconcile with Edythe.

Delysia and Miss Pettigrew have just returned to the flat when Michael unexpectedly arrives, furious. Delysia explains why: having agreed to marry him, she had been distracted by Nick on the morning of her wedding, and had simply not turned up. Michael had got drunk, had hit a policeman, and had been sent to prison for thirty days. In spite of his evident temper, Miss Pettigrew is impressed.

They take a taxi to Nick's nightclub, where Delysia will be singing. Miss Pettigrew strikes up a rapport with Joe Blomfield, a wealthy middle-aged bachelor who has made his fortune designing women's corsets. Delysia is sitting with Michael when Nick demands a dance. Michael bridles, and the two men square off. Seeing that Delysia is unable to resist Nick, Miss Pettigrew hisses to Michael "Sock him one". Michael does so, and Nick backs off. Quickly leaving the nightclub, Michael and Delysia hail a cab, while Joe and Miss Pettigrew hail another. Miss Pettigrew confesses that in spite of appearances she is in reality a penniless governess; Joe says that makes no difference to his growing feelings. The couple drive around for 45 minutes to allow the others some time at the flat alone. By the time Miss Pettigrew arrives, Delysia and Michael have decided to marry. Planning to buy a large house, they ask if Miss Pettigrew will live with them as their housekeeper. Overjoyed, she agrees, and is even happier when she hears that Joe will be calling for her in the morning. She comments "I have a beau at last."

== Principal characters ==
- Guinevere Pettigrew, governess
- Delysia LaFosse (born Sarah Grubb), nightclub singer and socialite
- Edythe Dubarry, beauty salon owner, friend of Delysia
- Phil, lover of Delysia
- Nick Calderelli, lover of Delysia, nightclub owner
- Michael, lover of Delysia, wealthy self-made man
- Joe Blomfield, middle-aged wealthy bachelor

== Background and reception ==
Miss Pettigrew Lives for a Day was Watson's third novel. The initial draft was initially rejected by Methuen as it was very different from her earlier historical and romantic books. Watson was confident in the work, though, and struck a deal with the publisher to write another similar country drama (Upyonder) if they would publish Miss Pettigrew. The positive reception the novel received on publication in 1938 proved her right: the book was published in the US, it was translated into French, and she even agreed to a German translation before that had to be called off by the war.

In 2001 the novel was re-published by Persephone Books with a preface by Henrietta Twycross-Martin.

== Adaptations ==
- In 2001 a five-part abridgement by Elizabeth Bradbury was read on BBC Radio 4 by Maureen Lipman.
- Miss Pettigrew Lives for a Day is a 2008 film adaptation directed by Bharat Nalluri, with Frances McDormand in the title role and Amy Adams as Delysia Lafosse.
