= Grk book series =

Children's book series by Joshua Doder (pseudonym of Josh Lacey)

The Grk books are series of children's books written by Josh Lacey under the pseudonym Joshua Doder. The series follows the adventures of a boy called Tim and a dog called Grk. It is published by Andersen Press in the UK and Delacorte Press in the USA.

There are eight volumes in the series:

- A Dog Called Grk (2005)
- Grk and the Pelotti Gang (2006)
- Grk and the Hot Dog Trail (2006)
- Grk: Operation Tortoise (2007)
- Grk Smells a Rat (2008)
- Grk Takes Revenge (2009)
- Grk Down Under (2010)
- Grk and the Phoney Macaroni (2012)

The Grk books have been widely praised for their “infectious mix of thrills, spills and off-the-cuff humour” and “pure adventure fun” (Kirkus Reviews). Amanda Craig in The Times said: “Not since Tintin and Snowy has there been such a touching boy-dog partnership”.

== A Dog Called Grk ==
The first book in the series is A Dog Called Grk. A dog follows Tim home from school one day prompting Tim to play detective and find out who this mysterious dog belongs to. He discovers that the dog is called Grk and his owners have been kidnapped and imprisoned by an evil dictator, Colonel Zinfandel. This discovery leads Tim on a series of wild adventures where he must pilot a helicopter and break into a high security prison.

A Dog Called Grk was shortlisted for the Branford Boase Award.
