= Winifred Watson =

English novelist (1906–2002)

- Born: Winifred Eileen Watson; 20 October 1906
- Died: 5 August 2002 (aged 95)
- Citizenship: British
- Occupation: Novelist
- Spouse: Leslie Pickering
- Children: Keith Pickering
- Writing career
- Notable works: Fell Top; Miss Pettigrew Lives for a Day

Winifred Eileen Watson (20 October 1906 – 5 August 2002) was an English writer. She is best known for her 1938 novel Miss Pettigrew Lives for a Day, which was adapted into a 2008 film of the same name.

== Biography ==
Winifred Watson was born at Whitley Bay near Newcastle and educated at St Ronan's, a boarding school at Berwick-upon-Tweed. She lived most of her life in Newcastle. Although she was expected to attend university, as her sisters had, she was unable to because of the impact of the Depression on her father's shoe business. She began working as a typist to help support the family. Watson once said: "The person I worked for never gave me any work until the afternoon—he told me to bring some knitting in. So I wrote the whole book in the office."

Watson married Leslie Pickering, manager of a local timber firm, in January 1936. They had one son, Keith, born in 1941, who survived the Blitz by pure chance. Watson had put him upstairs but he was fussy so she brought him downstairs. A bomb destroyed the house next door and the fireplace was blown onto his cot. Being downstairs, he survived. After the bombing, she, her mother and the family next door moved in with Watson's in-laws. She stated it was these circumstances that made it impossible to write: "I just quit. It became impossible to write in a strange house with only one room for us all and my mother living with us, too. All my creative energy went into Keith." Other times, however, she said she had written all she wanted to write.

She died in Newcastle upon Tyne on 5 August 2002.

== Works ==
Her first novel, Fell Top, was written in part as a result of a dare from her brother-in-law after she remarked that what she was reading was rubbish and she could do better herself. After finishing Fell Top, she put the manuscript away and did not attempt to publish until years later when her sister saw an advertisement from a publisher. The publisher, Methuen, accepted Fell Top (which was published in 1935) and asked if there were any more manuscripts. Reviewers were impressed with Fell Top and it was adapted into a BBC radio play. (Fell Top was the kind of rustic novel that Stella Gibbons parodied in her novel Cold Comfort Farm.) Her second novel, Odd Shoes was published in 1936.

With the exception of Miss Pettigrew, all of Watson's novels are set in the countryside. Miss Pettigrew Lives for a Day was Watson's third novel and was initially rejected. Watson had wanted to write a fun story after her work on two dramas. She and her publisher compromised and she agreed to write another drama set in the country similar to her previous work (Upyonder, also published in 1938) if they would publish Miss Pettigrew Lives for a Day. As Watson predicted, Miss Pettigrew was an immediate success—in Britain, Australia and the United States. It was translated and published in France, and was about to be printed in Germany when World War II started. A musical film version was planned, starring Billie Burke as Miss Pettigrew, but Pearl Harbor put paid to that. "I wish the Japanese had waited six months," Watson said 60 years later.

She published her sixth and final novel, Leave and Bequeath, in 1943, a mystery story set in a country house.

Persephone Books published Miss Pettigrew Lives for a Day first in 2001, then in 2003, 2004, and 2005, and finally as a Persephone Classic in 2008 with a preface by Henrietta Twycross-Martin. The film Miss Pettigrew Lives for a Day was released in 2008 with Frances McDormand in the lead role and Amy Adams as Delysia Lafosse.

== Bibliography ==
- Fell Top (1935)
- Odd Shoes (1936)
- Miss Pettigrew Lives for a Day (1938)
- Upyonder (1938)
- Hop, Step and Jump (1939)
- Leave and Bequeath (1943)
