= Madeline Linford =

Journalist; founder of the Manchester Guardian women's page

- Born: Madeline Alberta Linford; 16 January 1895; Kilmacolm, Renfrewshire
- Died: 18 June 1975 (age 80)
- Known for: Creator of women's page at the Manchester Guardian
- Parent(s): Albert Wallace Linford; Annie Mary Harrison Nash

Madeline Alberta Linford (16 January 1895–18 June 1975) was the creator of the women's page at the Manchester Guardian and possibly the first woman to become pictures editor of a national newspaper in the United Kingdom.

== Career at the Manchester Guardian ==
Linford began to work for the Manchester Guardian at 18 years old at its offices on Cross Street, Manchester. She was an assistant to the advertising department, and was later appointed as the only woman in the senior editorial team while in her 20s, and remained the only woman on the team until 1944, when Mary Crozier joined the staff.

From 1917, she wrote theater reviews for the paper; many of these had no byline, and were identified only by her initials ("M.A.L.").

In the aftermath of the First World War, the Manchester Guardian helped raise money for a Quaker mission to help war victims, with whom Linford traveled to see how the money was being spent. Mary Crozier (daughter of C. P. Scott) said that her father was impressed by Linford's articles on the famine and typhus epidemic in Poland, and as a result she was sent on a second chaperoned trip to Germany Austria and Poland, where she was insured £2,000 against catching typhus and paid a secretarial wage. These were seen as the reason why the directors of the Guardian chose her to found a page in May 1922, "aimed at the intelligent woman", defined by C. P. Scott as discussing issues such as "domestic economy, labour-saving, dress, household prices, and the care of children". She encouraged established women writers such as Helena Swanwick, Evelyn Sharp, Leonora Eyles, Winifred Holtby, Vera Brittain and others.

As her page was suspended in 1939 following the onset of the Second World War, she joined the Women's Voluntary Service (WVS); however, she did night work as a picture editor and wrote occasional pieces for women's magazines until the 1950s.

== Novels and other work ==
In addition to her work on the Manchester Guardian Madeline wrote a biography of Mary Wollstonecraft, published in 1924, and also five novels: Broken Bridges (1923), The Roadside Fire (1924), A Home and Children (1926) Bread and Honey (1928) and Out of the Window (1930).

== Later years ==
Linford retired early in 1953 to live in Windermere in the Lake District. She is featured as one of six "women who shaped Manchester" at the John Rylands Library.
