= F. A. Mann =

Frederick Alexander Mann, CBE, FBA, QC (Hon.) also known as Francis Mann (11 August 1907 – 16 September 1991) was a German-born British jurist. A solicitor in private practice for most of his career, he was nevertheless one of the most influential legal scholars of his generation, being a noted authority on international law and the law of money.

== Biography ==
Mann was born in Frankenthal, Rhenish Palatinate, Germany, the son of a Jewish lawyer. He was educated at the University of Geneva, the Ludwig-Maximilians-Universität München, and the Friedrich Wilhelm University of Berlin, where he took a DrJur. In 1933, Mann and his wife, Eleanore Ehrlich, moved to the United Kingdom, in response to the Nazis' assumption of power. Among the couple's children were writer Jessica Mann (1937–2018) and publisher Nicola Beauman.

In the United Kingdom, Mann first worked as a consultant in German law. He also studied at the London School of Economics, obtaining an LLM in 1936. He published, in 1938, The Legal Aspect of Money, the first systematic study of the law of money in English, having first submitted it to the University of London for the LLD. The work was the first systematic study of the subject in English, in addition of being one of the first books by a living author to be quoted in court, tradition hitherto dictating that only works by deceased jurists could be used.

During the Second World War, was designated by the British as an enemy alien, although he was not interned because the local police force refused to do so. In 1946, he was naturalized as a British subject. In the same year, he returned to Germany as a member of the Legal Division of the Allied Control Council.

Having previously been unable to practice law because of his alien status, Mann became a solicitor in 1946, becoming a partner of the firm Hardman, Phillips and Mann, which merged with Herbert Smith in 1958. At the same time, he published extensively on international law, in addition to his work as a solicitor. Notably, he appeared as counsel for Belgium in the Barcelona Traction case.

Mann was elected a Fellow of the British Academy (FBA) in 1974 and appointed Commander of the Order of the British Empire (CBE) in the 1980 Birthday Honours for services to international law. He received the Great Cross of Merit of the Order of Merit of the Federal Republic of Germany in 1977. In 1991, he became the first solicitor to be appointed an honorary Queen's Counsel.

Of Mann, Lord Denning wrote that "Of all my learned friends, Francis Mann is the most learned of all".

== Selected publications ==
- The Legal Aspect of Money. London: Oxford University Press. 1938 – via Internet Archive.
- Studies in International Law (1973)
- Foreign Affairs in English Courts (1986)
- Further Studies in International Law (1990)
