= Chelsea College (17th century) =

Former college in London, England

Chelsea College was a polemical college founded in London in 1609. This establishment was intended to centralize controversial writing against Catholicism, and was the idea of Matthew Sutcliffe, Dean of Exeter, who was the first Provost. After his death in 1629 it declined as an institution.

== Foundation ==
James I of England was one of its foremost patrons, and supported it by grants and benefactions; he himself laid the first stone of the new edifice on 8 May 1609; gave timber for the building out of Windsor forest; and in the original charter of incorporation, bearing date 8 May 1610, ordered that it should be called "King James's College at Chelsey."

Building was begun on a piece of ground called Thame Shot (or Thames Shot), a site of six acres, crown lands from Westminster Abbey obtained at the Dissolution of the Monasteries, and leased by Sutcliffe from Charles Howard, 1st Earl of Nottingham. The College was to have consisted of two quadrangles, with a piazza along the four sides of the smaller court. Only one side of the first quadrangle was ever completed; and this range of buildings cost, according to Thomas Fuller, above £3,000.

== Fellows and members ==
The charter limited the number of members to a provost and nineteen fellows, of whom seventeen were to be in holy orders. The king himself nominated the members. Sutcliffe was the first provost, and John Overall, Thomas Morton, Richard Field, Robert Abbot, Miles Smith, John Howson, Martin Fotherby, John Spenser, John Prideaux, and John Boys, were among the original fellows, while the lay historians William Camden (a personal friend of Sutcliffe) and John Hayward were appointed to record and publish to posterity "all memorable passages in church or commonwealth."

Other original fellows included Benjamin Carier, John Layfield, Richard Brett, William Covell, Peter Lilly, Francis Burley, John White and William Hellier. Later were Edward Gee, and Nathanael Carpenter.

== History of the College ==
The scheme ultimately proved to be a failure. In consequence of a letter addressed by the king to Archbishop George Abbot, collections in aid of the institution were made in all the dioceses of England, but the amount raised was small, and hardly covered fees due to the collectors. After Sutcliffe's death the college sank into insignificance, and Charles I in 1636 refused to revive the moribund institution. William Laud thought of it as "controversy college", and he disliked public disputation as divisive. An engraving representing the building project, which was only very partially carried through, is in the second volume of Francis Grose's Military Antiquities (1788).

Daniel Featley was provost in 1630 as Sutcliffe's successor. William Slater was provost from 1645. The fourth and last provost was Samuel Wilkinson. The College was dissolved in the Interregnum, by 1655.

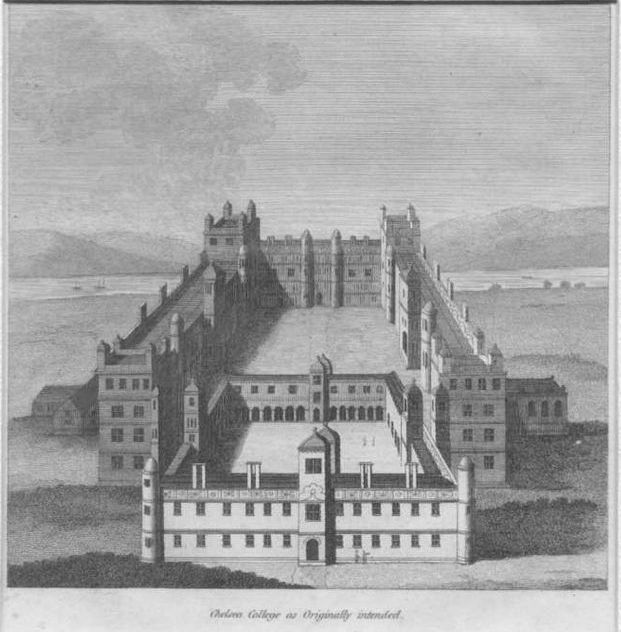
Impression of the intended College; from Francis Grose, Military Antiquities.

Nothing of the buildings now remains. For a while, though, there was activity and interest in the premises. Francis Kynaston wanted to move his royal academy there, at a point when there were only two resident fellows. From 1641 there was a project to set up a pansophist institution in England, on the visit of Comenius, and the Chelsea College building was mentioned in discussions of a Parliament-backed Universal College; this came to nothing. In the 1650s the College became a prison; and in the Second Anglo-Dutch War of the mid-1660s it housed prisoners of war.

John Dury in 1651 advocated that Parliament should renew the charter, and create a centre in the College for intelligencer work; his close colleague Samuel Hartlib also agitated that the revenue should be better spent. The grounds were granted to the Royal Society, and a print of the original design is prefixed to The Glory of Chelsey Colledge revived, published in 1662 by John Darley (rector of North Hill, Cornwall), who, in a dedication to Charles II, urged that monarch to grant a fixed revenue to the college. This royal grant was apparently reversed (or repurchased for a sum never handed over).

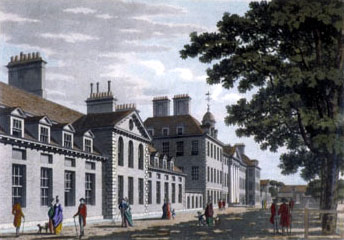
Chelsea Hospital in 1800.

After proposals including an observatory, supported by John Flamsteed but vetoed by Christopher Wren in favour of Greenwich, the site was devoted to Chelsea Hospital later in the reign of Charles II, with the old name still used in the following years. The king had wanted to keep open the chance of using the site also as a barracks for a standing army. The situation was resolved only when Stephen Fox, the major benefactor to the Hospital, put up £1,300 of his own money for its purchase, and made a deal with the Royal Society through the good offices of John Evelyn.
