= Bargrave =

Bargrave is a surname. Notable people with the surname include:

- Isaac Bargrave (1586–1643), English royalist churchman
- John Bargrave (1610–1680), English author and collector
