= Fotherby (surname) =

Fotherby is a surname. Notable people with the surname include:

- Charles Fotherby (c. 1549–1619), English clergyman
- Martin Fotherby (c. 1560–1620), English clergyman
- Robert Fotherby (died 1646), English explorer and whaler
