= William Frend =

William Frend may refer to:

- William Frend (reformer) (1757–1841), English clergyman (later Unitarian), social reformer and writer
- W. H. C. Frend (William Hugh Clifford Frend, 1916–2005), English ecclesiastical historian, archaeologist and Anglican priest

== See also ==
- William Frend De Morgan (1839–1917), English potter
- William Friend (disambiguation)
- William Freind (c. 1715–1766), Dean of Canterbury
