= Nathaniel Carpenter =

Nathaniel Carpenter may refer to:

- Nathanael Carpenter (1580s–1628), English author, philosopher, and geographer
- Nathaniel L. Carpenter (1805–1892), entrepreneur, owner of a steamboat line, and cotton trader
