= Anna Weamys =

English author

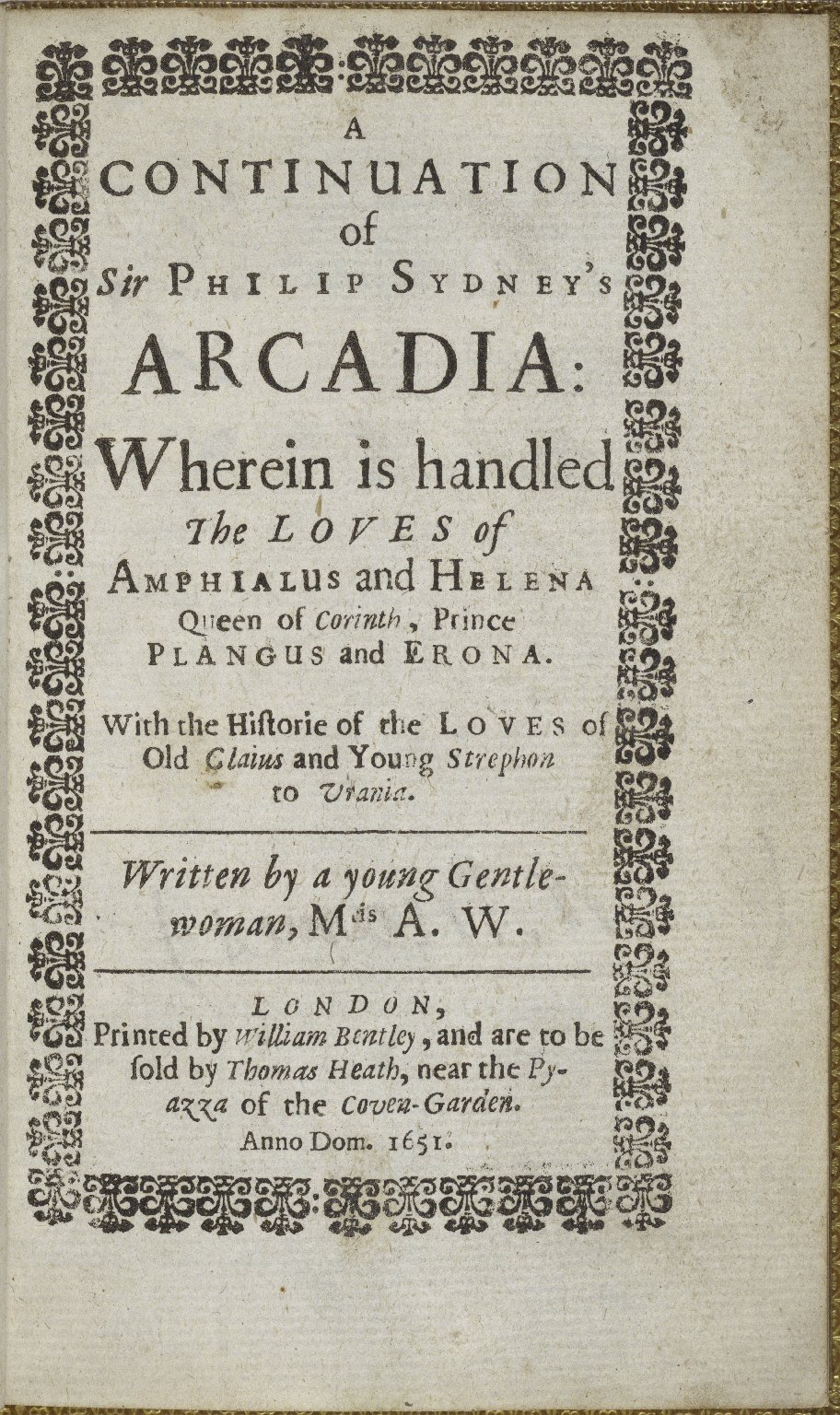
The title page of a 1651 edition of Weamys' continuation of the Arcadia.

Anna Weamys, sometimes referred to as Anne Wemyss (fl. 1651) was an artist and an English author. She was a noted painter of portrait miniatures. None of her works can now be identified without doubt but there are a couple of suspects. She has been identified as the author of the prose romance A Continuation of Sir Philip Sydney's Arcadia. In her lifetime she was known as a painter.

== Life ==
Wemyss was born in 1631 or 1632. She was the daughter of Jane (born Bargrave) and Dr Lodowick Wemyss. Her father was a Church of England clergyman whose living of Lambourne in Essex, was sequestered and given to a puritan minister in the 1640s. She had notable Royalist relatives. Her maternal uncle John Bargrave and her uncle Isaac Bargrave were both Royalist clergy.

== Painting ==
In the 1650s she was painting professionally. Sir William Sanderson published "Graphice: the use of the pen and pensil" in 1658 and he refers to four oil painters: Joan Carlile, Mary Beale, and ‘Mrs. Brooman’ (probably Sarah Broman) and Weimes (sic). The first two are well known as professional women painters but the other two are less certain.

== Writing ==
Weamys was the author of the prose romance A Continuation of Sir Philip Sydney's Arcadia (1651), which appeared under the name "Mistress A. W."

In her writing, Weamys presented a conclusion to the unresolved narratives with a multiple marriage ceremony for four couples at the end of the plot. Her work also included some political overtones and developed the plot of the character Mopsa, creating a parody of ballads and folk tales.

A modern edition of Weamys' book was edited by Patrick Cullen and was published in 1994.

== Identity ==
Little is known of Weamys' life, but Patrick Cullen situates her in the context of a network of royalist sympathizers of the English Civil War (1642–1651) and interregnum, including aristocratic patron Henry Pierrepont, 1st Marquess of Dorchester and his daughters Anne Manners, Lady Roos and Grace Pierrepont, writer James Howell, printer William Bentley, bookseller Thomas Heath, and possibly poet Frances Vaughan (née Altham).

This identify is derived from secondary sources, such as a congratulatory letter from James Howell to "Dr Weames" recorded in Epistolae Ho-elianae (1650).

== Death and legacy ==
She died on 19 December 1698 and she was buried in Westminster Abbey. A plaque records her life and her parents.

Her will mentioned in particular Anne Scott, 1st Duchess of Buccleuch because she had been so good to her. She left her a painting which is presumed to be of her and four or five other works that the Duchess could choose from her studio. Her will mentions other paintings and her relatives Elizabeth Fullagar and Hester Nowers, (born Bargrave).

Weamys' work demonstrates how writing by Sidney was interpreted by his female readership and illustrate the development or prose as it became to resemble the modern novel.
