= Richard Field (theologian) =

English ecclesiological theologian

Richard Field (1561–1616) was an English ecclesiological theologian associated with the work of Richard Hooker. Whereas Hooker, eight years Field's senior, had written his Lawes of Ecclesiastical Polity to defend conformity against non-conformity, Field's major work, Of the Church (1606/10), was a defence of the Protestant Church of England under its Elizabethan settlement against the charge of Romanist opponents that it was no church at all.

Field maintained that Anglican piety and polity continued the pre-Tridentine Catholic conciliar tradition. He argued that all the essential doctrinal points of Protestantism had been averred and defended constantly by certain theologians of the Roman Church throughout the preceding centuries, but that this fact had been increasingly overshadowed by the influence of the prevailing papist faction. Thus in essence, when viewed according to its roots in the apostolic gospel as defended by the decreasing minority of faithful spokesmen, the Church of Rome had always been a Protestant church – but that this had been overwhelmed by the ever-worsening papist/Romanist (Field used both terms) errors.

Although in his personality he was known as having an amiable and peaceable disposition, his writings against the papists, particularly Robert Bellarmine and Stapleton, rose to heights of implacable polemicism.

== Life ==
Field was born 15 October 1561, at Hemel Hempstead in Hertfordshire, where his father had an estate. He was educated at Berkhamsted School and was sent by his father to Oxford at the age of sixteen (1577). There is one piece of flimsy evidence that he matriculated at Magdalen College, Oxford, but Magdalen Hall, Oxford is more likely. Here he certainly took his B.A. degree, 18 November 1581, and M.A., 2 June 1584, and was appointed as catechism lecturer, where his reputation was such that John Rainolds and many others came to hear him. He was considered one of the best disputants in the university. His father wanted him to marry and not be ordained. But Field returned to Oxford, and after a residence of seven years, and until he took his degree of B.D. 14 January 1592, he was made divinity reader of Winchester Cathedral.

In 1594 he was chosen divinity lecturer to Lincoln's Inn, and soon after was presented by Richard Kingsmill, a bencher of the Inn, to the parish of Burghclere, Hampshire, near Kingsmill's home at Highclere. He turned down the wealthier living of St. Andrews, Holborn, and continued for the rest of his life as rector of Burghclere. On 7 December 1596 he proceeded to the degree of D.D., being at that time of The Queen's College.

In September 1598 he received a letter from the Lord Chamberlain, George Carey, 2nd Baron Hunsdon, desiring him to come and preach a probationary sermon before Queen Elizabeth on the 23rd. He was subsequently appointed one of the royal chaplains in ordinary, and received a grant of the next vacant prebend at Windsor. This grant is dated 30 March 1602, and he succeeded to the vacancy, and was installed 3 August 1604. He was joined in a special commission with William Paulet, 4th Marquess of Winchester, Thomas Bilson, and others, for ecclesiastical causes within the diocese of Winchester; and in another to exercise all spiritual jurisdiction in the said diocese with John Whitgift, Bilson and others, by James I, 1603, to whom he was also chaplain, and by whom he was invited to the Hampton Court conference of January 1604. When King James came to Oxford in 1605, Field disputed with John Aglionby before the king, and was praised by Nathaniel Brent.

In 1610 he was made Dean of Gloucester, but never resided there, preaching a few times a year to large audiences. He chiefly resided at Burghclere and Windsor; he was on intimate terms with Sir Henry Savile and Sir Henry Neville. Field may have been a friend of Richard Hooker, perhaps introduced by John Spencer. The king discussed theology with him, and once planned to send him to Germany to settle the differences between Lutherans and Calvinists; and made Field one of the fellows of the intended but ill-fated Chelsea College, and on hearing of his death, expressed his regret in the words, 'I should have done more for that man.'

On 14 October 1614 his wife died, leaving him six sons and a daughter. After two years he married again, but little more than a month later, on 15 November 1616, he was seized with a fit of apoplexy and died. He was buried in the chapel of St. George's, Windsor, below the choir. A black marble slab was laid over his grave (no longer present), and an inscription in brass recording his death and that of his first wife, Elizabeth Harris.

== Works ==
Field's apologetic literature attacked what he saw as the elevation of Scholastic opinion into articles of necessary faith, and the emergence of an exalted view of the Roman primacy over the conciliar authority. He concluded that modern Roman Catholicism was echoing the errors of Donatism in its claim to exclusive purity. Field was also at the forefront of the argument that Anglicanism should accept the decrees of the first seven ecumenical councils as binding.

His major work Of the Church was first published in 1606. This contained only the first four of the five intended books. In 1610 was printed the fifth book. A second edition was edited by Nathaniel Field, the author's son, and dedicated to George Villiers, 1st Duke of Buckingham. This edition is charged by the Scots in their Canterburian's Self-conviction, 1641. with having additions made by Archbishop William Laud. The third edition was printed by William Turner (1635). A modern edition was published by the Ecclesiastical History Society, Cambridge, 1847–52, 4 vols., reprinted without the EHS imprimatur, 1853.

In 1604 Field had published a sermon on Jude 3.

At his death Field had apparently commenced a work entitled A View of the Controversies in Religion, which in these last times have caused the Lamentable Divisions in the Christian World. Only the preface (or perhaps an interim draft thereof), and a few preliminary notes, were completed, and these were printed in his 'Life', by his son Nathaniel. This latter was published by John Le Neve in 1716. From a copy of this life, interleaved with manuscript additions from the author's rough draft by the editor (Le Neve), and some notes by White Kennett, Richard Gough drew up the 'Life of Field,' which was printed in an edition of the Biographia Britannica. Chalmers, in his Biographical Dictionary, transcribed the article and preserved it.

== Family ==
On 9 April 1594 he married Elizabeth, daughter of the Rev. Richard Harris, fellow of New College and rector of Hardwick, Buckinghamshire. Elizabeth bore six children and died in 1614. His second wife was John Spencer's widow Dorothy, daughter of Thomas Cranmer, the archbishop's nephew, and Isaak Walton's aunt. Of Field's sons, Nathaniel was prebendary of Chichester and rector of Stourton. Richard was M.D. and died single in 1638 (not 1696 as is sometimes said – the Richard Field who died in 1696 was son of Field's son Nathaniel). Giles died in 1629, aged 21, and is buried at New College Oxford with a memorial tablet in the cloisters. His eldest son John took his B.A. at Trinity College, Oxford in 1614; his other, youngest sons were Josias and Anthonie; his daughter Judith married the son of Field's second wife.
