= Hate speech actions by country =

Hate speech, defined by the Cambridge Dictionary as "public speech that expresses hate or encourages violence towards a person or group based on something such as race, religion, sex, or sexual orientation", has been carried out by some state leaders or state policies. Hate speech is "usually thought to include communications of animosity or disparagement of an individual or a group on account of a group characteristic such as race, colour, national origin, sex, disability, religion, or sexual orientation".

== Hate speech actions by country ==
A few states, including Saudi Arabia, Iran, Uganda, Rwanda Hutu factions, actors in the Yugoslav Wars, and Ethiopia, have been described as spreading official hate speech or incitement to genocide in the late twentieth and early twenty-first centuries.

=== Ethiopia ===
Since Abiy Ahmed became prime minister of Ethiopia in 2018, he repeatedly used hate speech against ethnic Tigrayans. Expressions he used included "daylight hyenas" (Amharic: የቀን ጅቦች) and "unfamiliar others" (Amharic: ፀጉረ ልውጥ), that in the Ethiopian context were dehumanising and interpreted as referring to Tigrayans. Abiy described Tigrayans as "cancers and weeds to be uprooted". In 2021 during the Tigray War, African politics researcher Alex de Waal described Abiy as having "turned up the volume of nationalist-populist rhetoric to maximum", shifting ethnic hate speech from "fringe diaspora groups" to the mainstream.
