= William Friend =

William Friend or Bill Friend may refer to:

- William Benedict Friend (1931–2015), American Roman Catholic bishop in Louisiana
- Bill Friend (engineer) (died 2021), American executive, Bechtel president in the 1980s
- Bill Friend (politician) (born 1949), American politician

== See also ==
- William Freind (c. 1710–1766), Dean of Canterbury
- William Frend (disambiguation)
