= St Nicholas' Church, Islip =

- Parish church of St Nicholas the Confessor
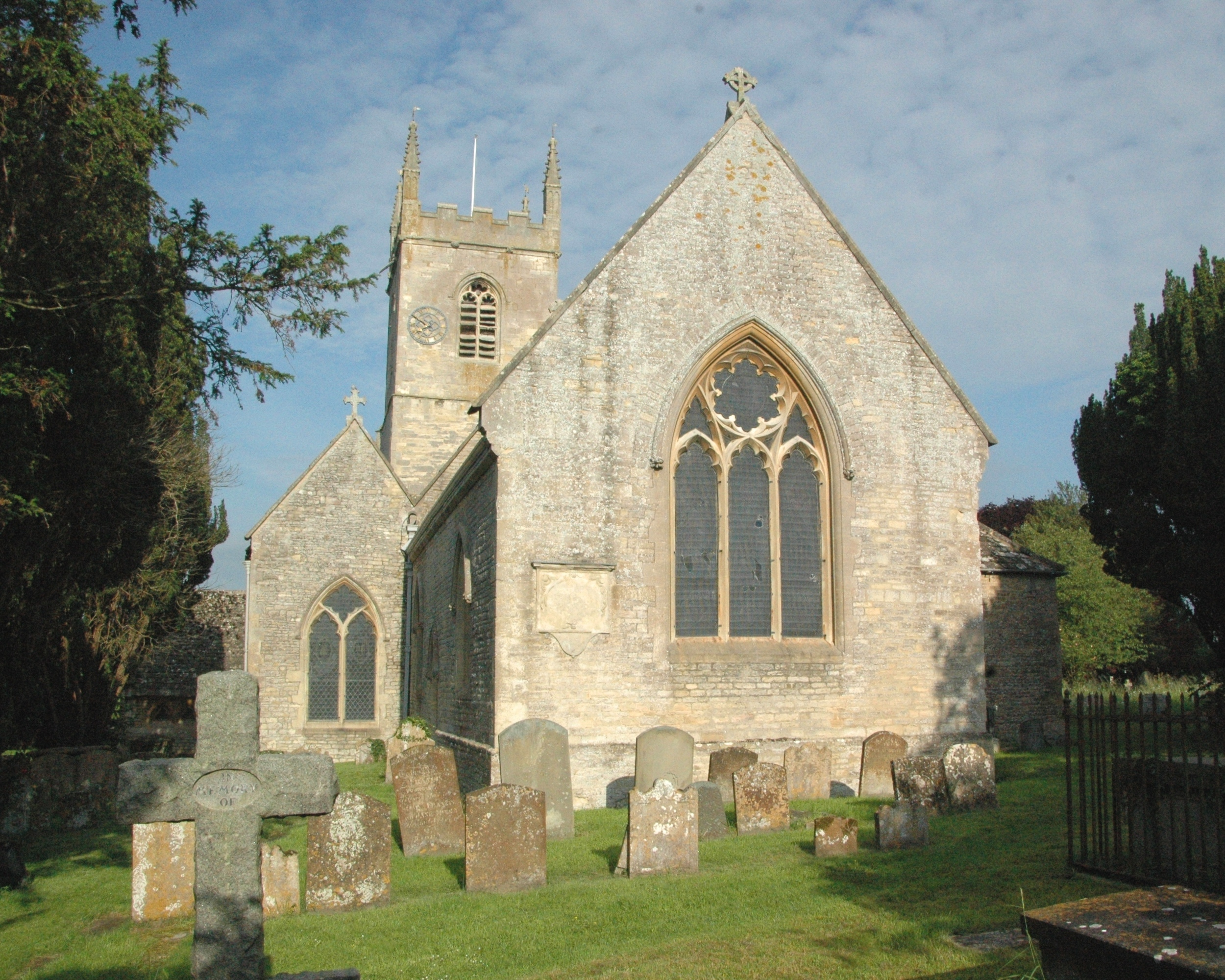
- East end of St. Nicholas' parish church

- Location within Oxfordshire
- 51°49′22.5″N 1°14′16″W
- OS grid reference: SP 52652 14095
- Location: Church Lane, Islip, Oxfordshire OX5 2SD
- Country: England
- Denomination: Church of England

History
- Dedication: Saint Nicholas

Architecture
- Style: Romanesque, English Gothic, Georgian, Gothic Revival
- Years built: circa 1200–1861

Administration
- Province: Canterbury
- Diocese: Oxford
- Archdeaconry: Oxford
- Deanery: Bicester and Islip
- Parish: Saint Nicholas the Confessor, Islip, Oxfordshire

St Nicholas' Church, Islip is the Church of England parish church of Islip, Oxfordshire, a village about 3 miles (5 km) east of Kidlington and 5 miles (8 km) north of Oxford.

== Parish church ==
Tradition holds that Edward the Confessor (circa 1004–66) was baptised in a church in Islip, and there has been a church on this site since at least 1065. The present church dates from the late 12th century but was largely rebuilt in the 14th century.

The church comprises a chancel, nave with south and north aisles, west tower and south porch. The late Romanesque north nave arcade survives, with two squat round piers, and a single round-headed window has been reset at the west end of the south aisle. The chancel was rebuilt in 1780. In 1861 the Gothic Revival architect E.G. Bruton remodelled the chancel and 'restored' the rest of the church.

In 1824 some medieval wall-paintings were uncovered in the south aisle. They included an Adoration of the Magi and a weighing of souls, both of which were considered to have been painted late in the 14th century. There was also an earlier Adoration, over which the later version had been painted, and there was also a Resurrection. All the paintings were plastered over during Bruton's restoration of the St. Nicholas' in 1861.

William Buckland, theologian, geologist and palaeontologist, is buried at the church.

St. Nicholas' parish church is Islip's only Grade I Listed Building.

=== Bells and clock ===
The belltower had a ring of five bells cast in the 17th century. In 1859 George Mears of the Whitechapel Bell Foundry recast them into a ring of six. In 1956 Mears and Stainbank of Whitechapel increased this to eight by casting the present treble and second bells. St. Nicholas' has also a Sanctus bell cast in 1652 by James Keene of Woodstock.

The date of the church clock is unknown. It may be late 17th century, and is believed to have been made by Edward Hemins (the elder) of Bicester.

=== Benefice ===
Past incumbents of the parish include John Islip, Hugh Weston (1554 until 1558), John Aglionby (1600 until 1611), Thomas Atkinson (from 1638), Robert South (1678 until 1716), William Freind (1748 until 1766), William Vincent (1807 until 1815), John Ireland (1816 until 1835), the geologist William Buckland (1846 until 1856), Francis Trench (1857 until 1875) and Michael Scott-Joynt (1976 until 1981).

The Church of England parish is now part of the Benefice of the Ray Valley.

== Rectory ==
Rev. Dr. South, who founded Islip's parish school in 1710, had the then Rectory built for him in 1689. The Rectory is a Cotswold stone double pile house of five bays with attic dormer windows, 18th century sash windows and a central doorcase with canopy on carved brackets. William Vincent had the house enlarged in 1807, and it was restored in the middle of the 19th century. The Old Rectory is Islip's only Grade II* Listed Building.

== Edward the Confessor's chapel ==
King Edward the Confessor was born in Islip in about 1004. A chapel associated with him used to exist north of the church. Monks from Westminster Abbey studying at Gloucester College, Oxford used to celebrate the feast of St. Edward at the chapel.

In April 1645 during the English Civil War the chapel was damaged in a military engagement, and in the 1780s it was demolished. In 2006 the Channel 4 archaeology programme Time Team visited Islip and tried unsuccessfully to find the remains of the chapel.

== Sources ==
- Beeson, C.F.C.; Simcock, A.V. (1989) [1962]. Clockmaking in Oxfordshire 1400–1850 (3rd ed.). Oxford: Museum of the History of Science. p. 44. ISBN 0-903364-06-9.
- Edwards, John (1990). "Some Lost Mediaeval Wall-Paintings". Oxoniensia. LV. Oxfordshire Architectural and Historical Society: 81–98. ISSN 0308-5562.
- Jennings, Anthony (2009). The Old Parsonage, The Story of the English Parsonage. London and New York: Continuum International Publishing Group. p. 100. ISBN 9780826426581.
- Lobel, Mary D, ed. (1959). A History of the County of Oxford: Volume 6. Victoria County History. pp. 205–219.
- Lowe, J.C.B. (2000). "The Lost Paintings of Islip Church". Oxoniensia. LXV. Oxfordshire Architectural and Historical Society: 447. ISSN 0308-5562.
- Sherwood, Jennifer; Pevsner, Nikolaus (1974). Oxfordshire. The Buildings of England. Harmondsworth: Penguin Books. p. 664. ISBN 0-14-071045-0.
