= John Boys (priest) =

Dean of Canterbury (1571–1625)

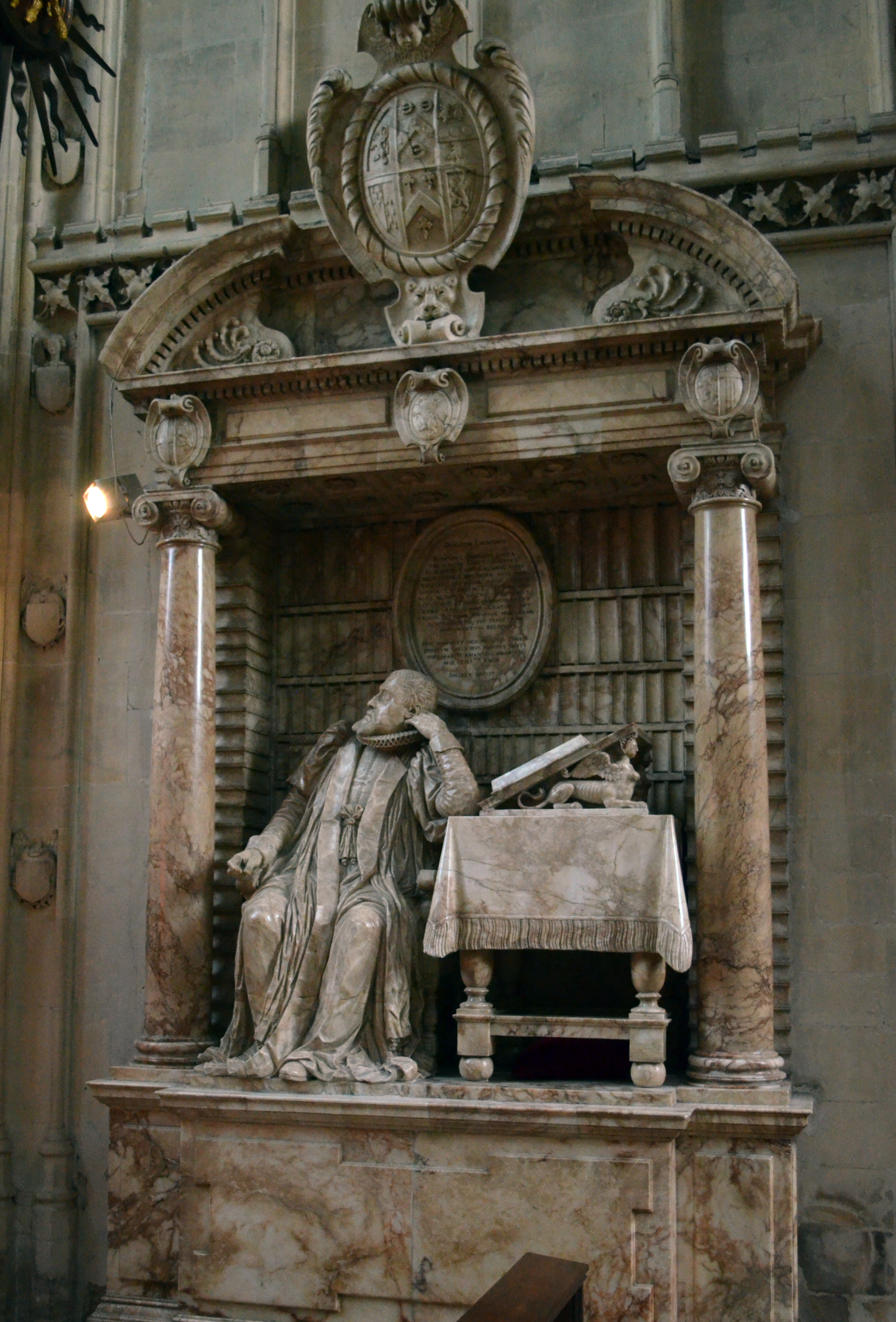
Monument to John Boys in Canterbury Cathedral

Arms of the Boys family of Kent: Or, a griffin segreant sable a bordure gules.

John Boys (1571–1625) was Dean of Canterbury from 1619 to 1625.

== Life ==
He was descended from an old family who at the beginning of the seventeenth century had no fewer than eight branches in Kent. The dean was the son of Thomas Boys of Eythorn, by Christian, daughter and coheiress of John Searles of Wye. He was born at Eythorn in 1571, and probably was educated at the King's School, Canterbury, for in 1586 he entered Corpus Christi College, Cambridge, where Archbishop Matthew Parker had founded some scholarships appropriated to scholars of that school. He took his M.A. degree in the usual course, but migrated to Clare Hall in 1593, apparently on his failing to succeed to a Kentish fellowship vacated by the resignation of Mr Coldwell, and which was filled up by the election of Dr Willan, a Norfolk man.

Boys was forthwith chosen fellow of Clare Hall. His first preferment was the small rectory of Betteshanger in his native county, which he tells us was procured for him by his uncle Sir John Boys of Canterbury, whom he calls 'my best patron in Cambridge.' He appears to have resided upon this benefice and to have at once begun to cultivate the art of preaching. Archbishop John Whitgift gave him the mastership of the Eastbridge Hospital in Canterbury, and soon afterwards the vicarage of Tilmanstone, but the aggregate value of these preferments was quite inconsiderable, and when he married Angela Bargrave of Bridge, near Canterbury, in 1599, he must have had other means of subsistence than his clerical income.

The dearth of competent preachers to supply the London pulpits appears to have been severely felt about this time, and in January 1593, Whitgift had written to the vice-chancellor and heads of the university of Cambridge, complaining of the refusal of the Cambridge divines to take their part in this duty. The same year that the primate appointed Boys to Tilmanstone, we find him preaching at St Paul's Cross, though he was then only twenty-seven years of age. Two years after he was called upon to preach at the Cross again, and it was actually while he was in the pulpit that Robert Devereux, 2nd Earl of Essex made his mad attempt at rebellion (8 February 1600–1).

Next year we find him preaching at St Mary's, Cambridge, possibly while keeping his acts for the B.D. degree, for he proceeded D.D. in the ordinary course in 1605; the Latin sermon he then delivered is among his printed works. Whitgift's death (February 1604) made little alteration in his circumstances; Archbishop Richard Bancroft soon took him into his favour, and he preached at Ashford, on the occasion of the primate holding his primary visitation there on 11 September 1607. Two years after this Boys published his first work, The Minister's Invitatorie, being An Exposition of all the Principall Scriptures used in our English Liturgie: together with a reason why the Church did chuse the same.

The work was dedicated to Bancroft, who had lately been made chancellor of the University of Oxford, and in the 'dedicatorie epistle' Boys speaks of his 'larger exposition of the Gospels and Epistles' as shortly about to appear. It appeared accordingly next year in quarto, under the title of An Exposition of the Dominical Epistles and Gospels used in our English Liturgie throughout the whole yeere, and was dedicated to his 'very dear uncle,' Sir John Boys of Canterbury. In his dedication Boys takes the opportunity of mentioning his obligations to Sir John and to Archbishop Whitgift for having watered what 'that vertuous and worthy knight' had planted.

The work supplied a great need and had a very large and rapid sale; new editions followed in quick succession, and it would be a difficult task to draw up an exhaustive bibliographical account of Boys' publications. Archbishop Bancroft died in November 1610, and George Abbot was promoted to the primacy in the spring of 1611. Boys dedicated to him his next work, An Exposition of the Festival Epistles and Gospels used in our English Liturgie, which, like its predecessors, was published in quarto, the first part in 1614, the second in the following year.

Hitherto he had received but scant recognition of his services to the church, but preferment now began to fall upon him liberally. Abbot presented him with the sinecure rectory of Hollingbourne, then with the rectory of Monaghan in 1618, and finally, on the death of Charles Fotherby, he was promoted by King James I to the deanery of Canterbury, and installed on 3 May 1619. Meanwhile, in 1616 he had put forth his Exposition of the proper Psalms used in our English Liturgie, and dedicated it to Sir Thomas Wotton, son and heir of Edward, lord Wotton of Marleigh. In 1620 he was made a member of the high commission court, and in 1622 he collected his works into a folio volume, adding to those previously published five miscellaneous sermons which he calls lectures, and which are by no means good specimens of his method or his style. These were dedicated to Sir Dudley Digges of Chilham Castle, and appear to have been added for no other reason than to give occasion for paying a compliment to a Kentish magnate.

On 12 June 1625 Henrietta Maria landed at Dover. Charles I saw her for the first time on the 13th, and next day the king attended service in Canterbury Cathedral, when Boys preached a sermon, which has been preserved. It is a poor performance, stilted and unreal as such sermons usually were; but it has the merit of being short. Boys held the deanery of Canterbury for little more than six years, and died among his books, suddenly, in September 1625. There is a monument to his uncle Sir John Boys 1535–1612 in the Lady Chapel of the cathedral.

He left no children; his widow died during the rebellion.

== Works ==
He quotes widely and from contemporary literature including popular writers of the day. Francis Bacon's Essays and The Advancement of Learning, Sandys's Travels, Owen's, More's, and John Parkhurst's Epigrams, Piers Plowman, and Richard Verstegan's Restitution, with Boys' favourite book, Josuah Sylvester's translation of Du Bartas's Divine Weeks all feature. Boys' works contain proverbs, allusions to the manners and customs of the time, curious words and expressions.

His works were translated into German and published at Strasburg in 1683, and again in two volume in 1685. The Works of John Boys were reprinted in English in 1997 by Soli Deo Gloria Publications taken from the 1854 edition published by Stanford and Swords, New York.

Church of England titles
Preceded by Charles Fotherby	Dean of Canterbury; 1619–1625	Succeeded by Isaac Bargrave
