= Tajudeen Abdul-Raheem =

Nigerian politician (1961–2009)

- Born: 6 January 1961
- Died: 25 May 2009 (aged 48)
- Occupations: General Secretary of the Seventh Pan-African Congress, Director of Justice Africa, the Deputy Director of United Nations Millennium Campaign of Africa
- Known for: general secretary of the Pan-African Movement, director of Justice Africa, the Deputy Director of United Nations Millennium Campaign for Africa, as well as a writer for newspapers and journals across Africa
- Movement: Pan-Africanism

Tajudeen Abdul-Raheem (6 January 1961 – 25 May 2009) was a Pan-African scholar and activist. His most prominent function was as the General Secretary of the Seventh Pan-African Congress in 1994. He also served as director of Justice Africa, the Deputy Director of United Nations Millennium Campaign for Africa, as well as a writer for newspapers and journals across Africa.

== Childhood and studies ==
Abdul-Raheem was born in Funtua, Nigeria in 1961.

Abdul-Raheem obtained an undergraduate degree in political science from Bayero University Kano and was a Rhodes scholar at Oxford University, where he obtained his PhD in politics. He also studied at Buffalo University.

During his application for the Rhodes Scholarship to the University of Oxford, Abdul-Raheem appeared at the interview wearing traditional African attire and questioned the association of this prestigious award with Cecil Rhodes, a figure symbolizing colonialism and imperialism. Despite this, he was awarded the scholarship and went on to study politics at Oxford, where he later earned his doctorate degree.

== Activist and author ==
Abdul-Raheem moved to London in 1989. While living here, he co-founded the Africa Research and Information Bureau (ARIB) in 1990. He went on to rise to prominence as the General Secretary of the Seventh Pan-African Congress that took place in Kampala in 1994. He was encouraged to take on this post by the former Tanzanian politician A.M. Babu. He also served as director of Justice Africa, deputy director of the United Nations Millennium Campaign for Africa, as well as a writer for newspapers and journals across Africa, authoring a popular weekly column titled "Pan-African Postcard."

Tajudeen Abdul-Raheem was actively involved in a wide range of African and anti-imperialist organizations, including the Pan African Movement, the All African Anti-Imperialist Youth Front, and the Anti-Apartheid Movement, as well as campaigns such as the Save the Sharpeville Six.

Abdul-Raheem lectured at several academic institutions, including the School of Oriental and African Studies (SOAS) and Goldsmiths College in London, as well as universities in the United States. He also served as a UNESCO visiting professor in Germany. Throughout his academic career, he was recognized for his honesty and incisive analyses in political economy.

Taju, as he was fondly called, dedicated his life to the Pan-African vision and the peaceful unification of Africa. He left behind a wife, Mounira Chaieb, and two daughters, Ayesha and Aida.

"A thinker and writer, but above all a mighty talker, he inspired and influenced a whole generation of Africans and Africanists with his mixture of passion and humor. It is considered ironic that he died on 25 May – Africa Day." , said Chidi Odinkalu.

== Death ==
Abdul-Raheem died at the age of 48 in a road accident on 25 May 2009 in Nairobi, Kenya. He was on his way to the airport to catch a flight to Rwanda, where he had been scheduled to meet with the President of Rwanda. According to geographer Patricia Daley, the accident took place in unclear and possibly suspicious circumstances: "Those who saw the body said his injuries were not consistent with driving at a high speed and there was no other vehicle involved."
