= Listed buildings in Bridge, Kent =

Civil Parish in Kent, England

Bridge is a village and civil parish in the City of Canterbury district of Kent, England. It contains 44 listed buildings that are recorded in the National Heritage List for England. Of these two are grade II* and 42 are grade II.

This list is based on the information retrieved online from Historic England.

== Key ==
Grade	Criteria
I	Buildings that are of exceptional interest
II*	Particularly important buildings of more than special interest
II	Buildings that are of special interest

== Listing ==
Name	Grade	Location	Type	Completed (Note: The date given is the date used by Historic England as significant for the initial building or that of an important part in the structure's description.)	Date designated	Grid ref. (Note: The grid reference is based on the British national grid reference system, sometimes known as OSGB36, used by the Ordnance Survey.) Geo-coordinates	Notes	Entry number (Note: The "List Entry Number" is a unique number assigned to each listed building and scheduled monument by Historic England.)	Image	Wikidata
Upper Lodge	II	Bifrons Park, Patrixbourne			14 March 1980	TR1804655051; 51°15′11″N 1°07′24″E		1372079	Upload Photo	Q26653205
Bridge Place	II*	Bourne Park Road	building		29 September 1952	TR1812153908; 51°14′33″N 1°07′25″E		1336506	Bridge Place More images	Q17557226
Flats 1, 2 and 3, East Bridge House and Netherbury	II	2 and 3, East Bridge House, Bridge Hill			30 January 1967	TR1848454036; 51°14′37″N 1°07′44″E		1085694	Upload Photo	Q26373861
Sunnyside	II	2, High Street			14 March 1980	TR1803054523; 51°14′53″N 1°07′22″E		1085695	Upload Photo	Q26373867
8, High Street	II	8, High Street			14 March 1980	TR1804954500; 51°14′53″N 1°07′23″E		1336507	Upload Photo	Q26620994
10 and 12, High Street	II	10 and 12, High Street			14 March 1980	TR1805854496; 51°14′53″N 1°07′23″E		1085696	Upload Photo	Q26373873
Wych Elm	II	13, High Street			14 March 1980	TR1813754444; 51°14′51″N 1°07′27″E		1085703	Upload Photo	Q26373906
Beresford Lodge	II	14, High Street			14 March 1980	TR1806854483; 51°14′52″N 1°07′24″E		1336508	Upload Photo	Q26620995
Numbers 15, 17, 19 (albany ) and 21 (albany House)	II	15 and 17, High Street			14 March 1980	TR1814954432; 51°14′50″N 1°07′28″E		1099149	Upload Photo	Q26391301
16 and 16a, High Street	II	16 and 16a, High Street			14 March 1980	TR1807454473; 51°14′52″N 1°07′24″E		1085697	Upload Photo	Q26373878
Wayside	II	18, High Street			14 March 1980	TR1808354461; 51°14′51″N 1°07′24″E		1085698	Upload Photo	Q26373882
Rosedale Villas	II	22 and 24, High Street			30 January 1967	TR1810154438; 51°14′51″N 1°07′25″E		1336509	Upload Photo	Q26620996
Gordon House	II	30, High Street			14 March 1980	TR1813754398; 51°14′49″N 1°07′27″E		1085699	Upload Photo	Q26373888
32 and 34, High Street	II	32 and 34, High Street			14 March 1980	TR1814354390; 51°14′49″N 1°07′27″E		1099191	Upload Photo	Q26391342
33, High Street	II	33, High Street, CT4 5JZ			14 March 1980	TR1817254379; 51°14′49″N 1°07′29″E		1085704	Upload Photo	Q26373911
37, High Street	II	37, High Street			14 March 1980	TR1817654371; 51°14′48″N 1°07′29″E		1085705	Upload Photo	Q26373917
39 and 41, High Street	II	39 and 41, High Street			14 March 1980	TR1818454363; 51°14′48″N 1°07′29″E		1099117	Upload Photo	Q26391272
40 and 42, High Street	II	40 and 42, High Street			30 January 1967	TR1816554351; 51°14′48″N 1°07′28″E		1099206	Upload Photo	Q26391359
43, 45 and 45a, High Street	II	43, 45 and 45a, High Street			14 March 1980	TR1819154355; 51°14′48″N 1°07′30″E		1085706	Upload Photo	Q26373922
Dover Lodge	II	48, High Street			14 March 1980	TR1817954344; 51°14′47″N 1°07′29″E		1085700	Upload Photo	Q26373893
Lime Cottage	II	49, High Street			14 March 1980	TR1821954326; 51°14′47″N 1°07′31″E		1099120	Upload Photo	Q26391274
Watling House	II	52, High Street			14 March 1980	TR1818654332; 51°14′47″N 1°07′29″E		1099207	Upload Photo	Q26391360
Former White Horse Inn	II	53, High Street, CT4 5LA	pub		14 March 1980	TR1823254305; 51°14′46″N 1°07′32″E		1085707	Former White Horse Inn More images	Q26373928
61, High Street	II	61, High Street			14 March 1980	TR1825354278; 51°14′45″N 1°07′33″E		1349072	Upload Photo	Q26632394
Number 63, Ty Guyn and Number 65	II	65, High Street			14 March 1980	TR1825854272; 51°14′45″N 1°07′33″E		1085708	Upload Photo	Q26373933
69, High Street	II	69, High Street, CT4 5LB			30 January 1967	TR1828454231; 51°14′44″N 1°07′34″E		1085709	Upload Photo	Q26373938
73, High Street	II	73, High Street			14 March 1980	TR1829754218; 51°14′43″N 1°07′35″E		1085710	Upload Photo	Q26373943
The Red Lion Public House	II	75, High Street	pub		8 October 1976	TR1832354190; 51°14′42″N 1°07′36″E		1099132	The Red Lion Public House More images	Q26391287
Riverdale House	II	82, High Street			14 March 1980	TR1825854222; 51°14′43″N 1°07′33″E		1085701	Upload Photo	Q26373897
84, High Street	II	84, High Street, CT4 5LA			30 January 1967	TR1826354216; 51°14′43″N 1°07′33″E		1336511	Upload Photo	Q26620998
88-96, High Street	II	88-96, High Street			9 October 1976	TR1828954194; 51°14′42″N 1°07′34″E		1085702	Upload Photo	Q26373902
Alexandra House	II	High Street			14 March 1980	TR1816154364; 51°14′48″N 1°07′28″E		1336510	Upload Photo	Q26620997
Church Cottage	II	High Street			14 March 1980	TR1834254141; 51°14′41″N 1°07′37″E		1349056	Upload Photo	Q26632379
Church of St Peter	II*	High Street	church building		30 January 1967	TR1834554112; 51°14′40″N 1°07′37″E		1336512	Church of St Peter More images	Q17557230
Lynton House	II	High Street			14 March 1980	TR1835854149; 51°14′41″N 1°07′38″E		1336513	Upload Photo	Q26620999
River House	II	High Street			30 January 1967	TR1826854257; 51°14′45″N 1°07′34″E		1349073	Upload Photo	Q26632395
The Plough and Harrow Public House	II	High Street	pub		14 March 1980	TR1827154210; 51°14′43″N 1°07′34″E		1099172	The Plough and Harrow Public House More images	Q26391324
Wall to the Churchyard of Church of St Peter	II	High Street			14 March 1980	TR1837054112; 51°14′40″N 1°07′38″E		1099158	Upload Photo	Q26391310
Bridge Hill House	II	Higham Lane			3 July 1987	TR1883553695; 51°14′26″N 1°08′02″E		1260422	Upload Photo	Q26551437
Bridgeford House	II	Mill Lane			14 March 1980	TR1810654133; 51°14′41″N 1°07′25″E		1099095	Upload Photo	Q26391253
Little Bridge Place	II	Mill Lane			14 March 1980	TR1803354100; 51°14′40″N 1°07′21″E		1085711	Upload Photo	Q26373947
Great Pett Farmhouse	II	Pett Hill			14 March 1980	TR1758454318; 51°14′47″N 1°06′58″E		1349099	Upload Photo	Q26632418
Former Oast House at Renville Farm	II	Renville, CT4 5AD, Renville Farm			13 September 1977	TR1713955121; 51°15′14″N 1°06′37″E		1336570	Upload Photo	Q26621053
The Close	II	Union Road			14 March 1980	TR1795654359; 51°14′48″N 1°07′18″E		1336514	Upload Photo	Q26621000

== See also ==
- Grade I listed buildings in Kent
- Grade II* listed buildings in Kent

== Sources ==
- Newman, John (2013) [1969], Kent: North-East and East, The Buildings of England, New Haven and London: Yale University Press, ISBN 978-0-300-18506-5
