= Robert Freind =

English clergyman and headmaster

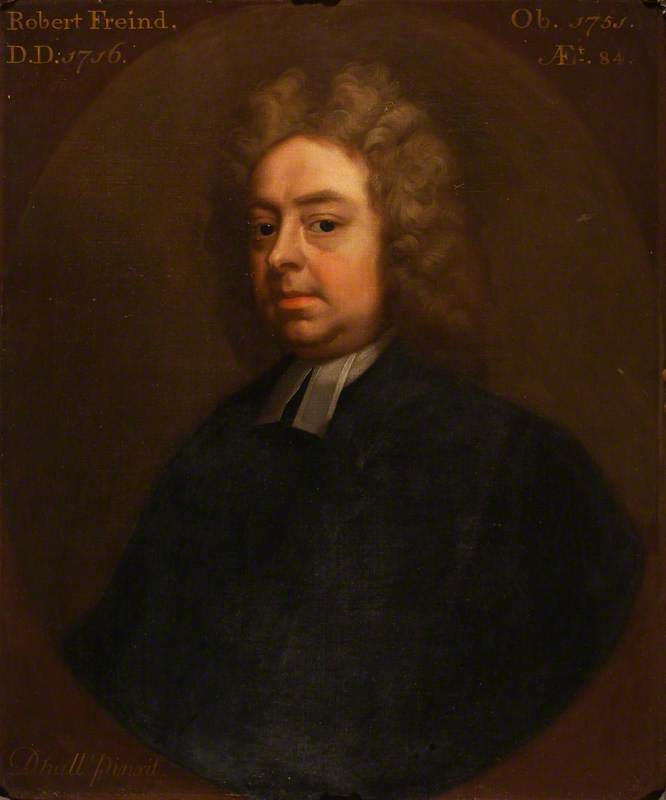
Robert Freind, painting by Michael Dahl

Robert Freind (1667–1751) was an English clergyman and headmaster of Westminster School.

== Life ==
Freind, eldest son of the Rev. William Freind (also Friend), rector of Croughton, Northamptonshire, was born there, and at an early age was sent to Westminster School, where he was admitted on the foundation in 1680. He obtained his election to Christ Church, Oxford, in 1686, and graduated B.A. 1690, M.A. 1693, and B.D. and D.D. 1709. Freind served the office of proctor in 1698, and in the following year was appointed under-master of Westminster School in the place of Michael Maittaire. In 1711 he succeeded Thomas Knipe as the headmaster, and in the same year was presented to the rectory of Witney in Oxfordshire.

Freind was appointed a canon of Windsor by letters patent dated 29 April 1729, and was installed a prebendary of Westminster Abbey on 8 May 1731. On his retirement from the headmastership in 1733 he was succeeded by John Nicoll, who had served nearly twenty years as the under-master of the school. On 26 March 1739 Freind resigned the living of Witney, which, through the influence of the Queen and Lady Sundon, he had succeeded in making over to his son. In March 1737 he was appointed canon of Christ Church, but he resigned his stall at Westminster in favour of his son in 1744.

Freind died on 7 August 1751, aged 84, and was buried in the chancel of Witney Church. There were two portraits of Freind at Christ Church, the one in the hall being painted by Michael Dahl. There is also in the library of the college a bust of Freind, executed by Michael Rysbrack in 1738. A portrait of Freind was also preserved along with the portraits of the other headmasters at Westminster School.

Freind was sociable, a scholar, and a successful schoolmaster; his circle included Francis Atterbury. Matthew Prior and Jonathan Swift. With Atterbury and other old Westminster boys he helped in the production of Charles Boyle's attack on Richard Bentley. Freind's niece, however, married a son of Bentley.

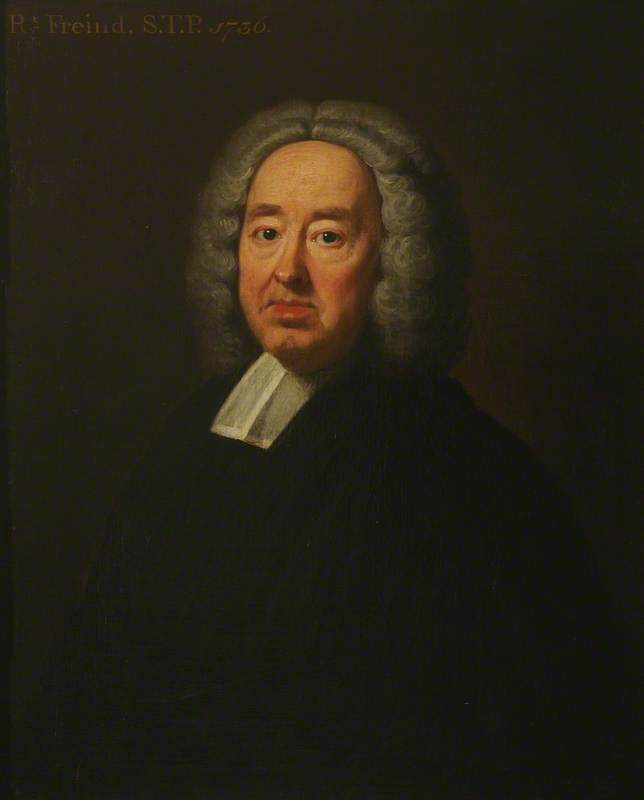
Robert Freind, painting by Michael Dahl

== Works ==
While a student Freind contributed English verses to the Vota Oxoniensia (1689) Two of his Latin poems, entitled Encænium Rusticum, anglice a Country Wake, and Pugna Gallorum Gallinaceorum, are printed in the Musarum Anglicanarum Delectus Alter, 1698. Oratio publice habita in Scholâ Westmonasteriensi 7° die Maii, 1705, aucthore Roberto Friend, A.M., is among the Lansdowne MSS. A Latin ode to the Duke of Newcastle, written by Freind in 1737, appeared in the Gentleman's Magazine (vii. 631). Freind also wrote the lengthy dedication to the queen for the medical works of his brother John Freind, which were published in 1733; and a number of epitaphs and other monumental inscriptions.

Freind published also:

- A Sermon preach'd before the Honble. House of Commons at S. Margaret's, Westminster, on Tuesday, Jany. 30, 1710–11, being the Anniversary Fast for the Martyrdom of King Charles I, London, 1710.
- Cicero's Orator, London, 1724.

== Family ==
Freind married Jane, only daughter of Dr. Samuel De l'Angle, prebendary of Westminster, whose son, John Maximilian De l'Angle, became the husband of Freind's sister, Anne. Freind had four children, three of whom died under age. The other, William Freind, succeeded his father in the living of Witney, and became dean of Canterbury.
