= Bernard Pawley =

Anglican priest (1911 - 1981)

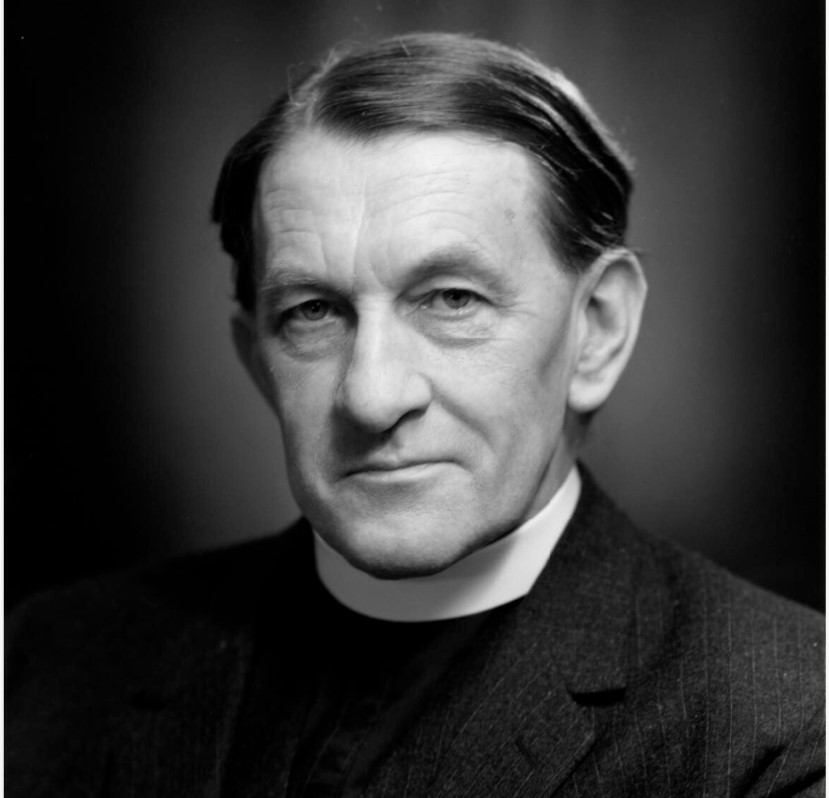
Bernard Pawley

Bernard Clinton Pawley (24 January 1911 – 15 November 1981) was an Anglican priest, author, and ecumenist.

He was born in Portsmouth, Hampshire, educated at Portsmouth Grammar School and Wadham College, Oxford and ordained in 1936. After curacies in Stoke on Trent and Leeds he was a chaplain to the British Armed Forces between 1940 and 1945. When peace returned he was Rector of Elland and then a canon residentiary at Ely Cathedral. After a brief spell in a similar role at St Paul's Cathedral he was appointed Archdeacon of Canterbury in 1972, a post he held for nine years. A noted commentator on Vatican affairs, he died in 1981.

== Bibliography ==
- An Anglican View of the Vatican Council (New York: Morehouse-Barlow, 1962)
- Looking at the Vatican Council (London: SCM Press, 1962)
- Anglican-Roman Relations and the Second Vatican Council (Westminster: Church Information Office, 1964)
- (contributor) Steps to Christian Unity (Doubleday, 1964)
- The Vatican Council: Third Session (Cincinnati: Forward Movement, [1966?])
- (editor) The Second Vatican Council: Studies by Eight Anglican Observers (London and New York: Oxford University Press, 1967)
- Rome and Canterbury, through Four Centuries: A Study of the Relations between the Church of Rome and the Anglican churches, 1530-1973 (New York: Seabury, 1975)
- (posthumous) Observing Vatican II: The Confidential Reports of the Archbishop of Canterbury's representative, Bernard Pawley, 1961-1964 (Cambridge University Press for the Royal Historical Society, 2013) ISBN 9781107052949

Church of England titles
Preceded by Michael John Nott	Archdeacon of Canterbury; 1972 –- 1981	Succeeded by John Arthur Simpson
