= Epistolae Ho-Elianae =

17-th century book by James Howell

Epistolae Ho-Elianae (or Familiar Letters) is a literary work by the 17th-century Anglo-Welsh historian and writer, James Howell. It was mainly written when Howell was in the Fleet Prison, during the 1640s; but its content reflects earlier travels he made from 1616 on behalf of a London glass factory. It appeared in three volumes from 1645 to 1650. A fourth volume was added in a collected edition of 1655. The fourth edition (1678) was published by Thomas Guy, and profits went to founding Guy's Hospital in London.

== Status as a letter collection and historicity ==
It is written in the form of a letter collection, but it has been suggested that some of the letters are fictional. The selection of the recipients has also been attributed to patronage relationships. A "Mrs. A. W." who occurs as a recipient has been fitted to another letter by Howell to provide a tentative deductive identification of the author of A Continuation of Sir Philip Sydney's Arcadia (1651) as Anna Weamys, who is not otherwise traced as a writer.

== Use as travel literature ==
As travel literature, Howell's work largely neglects scenic description. But some of the language used has been described as a possible source for the work of Joshua Poole on epithets.
