= John Aglionby (divine) =

John Aglionby (1566 – 6 February 1610) was an English clergyman and academic who was one of the translators of the King James Version of the Bible.

== Early life and education ==
Aglionby was born in Carlisle in 1566, the son of Edward Aglionby and Elizabeth Musgrove, the Aglionbys were an ancient family whose name was originally De Aguilon. After attending the free school in Kendal, he went to Queen's College, Oxford, where he matriculated on 13 December 1583, aged 16. He graduated B. A. on 28 June 1587, and M. A. on 1 July 1590 on which date he also became a fellow. He would subsequently be awarded a B. D on 12 July 1597 and a D. D. on 17 June 1600. In 1595 he was appointed divinity reader at Lincoln's Inn.

== Career and death ==
Between 1599 and 1600, Aglionby travelled abroad and was reported to have met Cardinal Robert Bellarmine. On his return he was made chaplain to Elizabeth I, in which capacity he would also serve James I. He became principal of St Edmund Hall, Oxford, on 4 April 1601. Also in 1601 he became rector of Bletchingdon in Oxfordshire.

In 1604, Aglionby was appointed to the Second Oxford Company of bible translators, who were tasked with working on the Gospels, Acts of the Apostles, and the Book of Revelation. He replaced the recently deceased Richard Edes. In 1607 he became rector of Islip, where he died on 6 February 1610 aged 43. He is buried near the altar of St Nicholas' Church, Islip.

== Family ==
He left behind a widow, Katherine (née Foxcroft), and four children: George, John, Thomas and Katherine. Of these, George Aglionby would later become master of Westminster School and Dean of Canterbury. He was an ancestor of the miser Margery Jackson of Carlisle.
