= George Aglionby =

English Royalist churchman

George Aglionby (c.1603–1643) was an English Royalist churchman, nominated in 1643 as Dean of Canterbury. He was a member of the Great Tew intellectual circle around Lucius Cary, and a friend and correspondent of Thomas Hobbes.

== Life ==
He was the son of John Aglionby, educated at Westminster School, from which he was elected to Christ Church, Oxford, where he matriculated in 1619, aged sixteen. He graduated B.A. in 1623, and successively proceeded M.A. in 1626, B.D. in 1633 and D.D. in 1635. He was hired as a tutor for her children including William Cavendish, 3rd Earl of Devonshire by the widowed Countess Christian Cavendish. In this position he was the replacement for Hobbes, who was a close associate of William Cavendish, 2nd Earl of Devonshire up to his death in 1628. Aglionby wrote to Hobbes on Cavendish family matters from 1629, and later made his way into the Great Tew circle.

In 1632 Aglionby accepted the vicarage of Cassington, Oxfordshire. On the death of his uncle, Dr. John King, in 1638, he was promoted to a stall in Westminster Abbey. In the following year he was made a prebendary of Chichester, and in 1642 compounded for the Deanery there. For some time he was a master of Westminster School, and was tutor to the young George Villiers, 2nd Duke of Buckingham.

He was deprived of his stall at Westminster; at Canterbury he was never installed, given the wartime conditions, and it is probable that he never visited his cathedral. He died of disease in Oxford, in November, 1643, and was buried in Christ Church Cathedral there.

== Family ==
In 1635 Aglionby married Sibilla Smith, of St. Martin-in-the Fields, London. It has been argued that William Aglionby was their son.

== Notes ==
Church of England titles
Preceded by Isaac Bargrave	Dean of Canterbury; 1643	Succeeded by Thomas Turner
