= John Potter (priest) =

British priest

John Potter (c. 1713 – 1770) was an 18th-century Church of England clergyman who was Dean of Canterbury from 1766 to 1770.

He was the eldest son of John Potter, Archbishop of Canterbury (1673/4–1747). Following a private education, he studied at Christ Church, Oxford (1727), taking an MA in 1734. His first ecclesiastical appointment was as vicar of St Mary, Blackburn (1738, resigned 1742), followed by rector of Elm, with Emneth Chapel (Norfolk, 1738–1755). In 1741 his father installed him as Archdeacon of Oxford. He obtained the degree of BD the same year. In 1742 he was collated by his father to the vicarage of Lydd (Kent), together with the Rectory of Chiddingstone. He was installed as a prebendary of Canterbury Cathedral in 1745 (Stall XII). He obtained the degree of DD in 1746, and the following year exchanged Chiddingstone for the rectory of Wrotham (Kent). In 1766 he succeeded Dr William Freind as Dean of Canterbury. He died in 1770 at Wrotham where he is buried.

Potter was disinherited by his father as a result of a marriage of which the archbishop disapproved but he nevertheless enjoyed considerable preferment within the church as a result of his father's patronage. Hasted noted 'He had married very imprudently in his early part of life, and consequently highly to the disapprobation of his father, who though he presented him as is mentioned before to several valuable preferments in the church, yet disinherited him, by leaving the whole of his fortune to his youngest son, Thomas Potter, esq.'

Church of England titles
Preceded by William Freind	Dean of Canterbury; 1766–1770	Succeeded by Brownlow North
