= John Simpson (priest) =

Anglican priest (1933–2019)

The Very Reverend John Simpson OBE
- Dean of Canterbury
- Church: Church of England
- Diocese: Canterbury
- Installed: 1986
- Term ended: 2000
- Predecessor: Victor de Waal
- Successor: Robert Willis
- Other post: Archdeacon of Canterbury

Orders
- Ordination: 1958 (deacon); 1959 (priest)

Personal details
- Born: 7 June 1933
- Died: 24 April 2019
- Denomination: Anglican
- Spouse: Ruth Simpson
- Children: 2 daughters and 1 son
- Education: Keble College, Oxford

John Arthur Simpson OBE (7 June 1933 – 24 April 2019) was an Anglican priest.

== Early life ==
Simpson was born in Cardiff on 7 June 1933, to Arthur Simpson, a draper, and Mary Esther Simpson, who worked for the Society for Promoting Christian Knowledge (SPCK). He was the youngest of three children.

== Education ==
Simpson attended Cathays High School in Cardiff. After National Service, where he learned Russian at Cambridge and worked as an interpreter in East Berlin, he went on to study Modern History at Keble College, Oxford, graduating in 1958. Simpson then trained for the priesthood at Clifton Theological College and was ordained in 1958.

== Career ==
After curacies in Leyton and Orpington, he was a tutor at Oak Hill Theological College from 1962 to 1972. He was then Vicar of Ridge, Hertfordshire until 1981 when he began his long association with the Diocese of Canterbury.

From 1981 to 1986 he was Archdeacon of Canterbury. In 1986 he was installed as the Dean of Canterbury, heading the large chapter and staff of the cathedral until his retirement in 2000.

After retirement, he lived in Folkestone. In December 2000 he was appointed an Officer of the Order of the British Empire (OBE) for "services to the Church of England". He died at home in Folkestone on 24 April 2019.

== Notes ==
Preceded by Bernard Clinton Pawley	Archdeacon of Canterbury; 1981 –- 1986	Succeeded by Michael Stanley Till
Preceded by Victor A de Waal	Dean of Canterbury; 1986 –- 2000	Succeeded by Robert Willis
