= Alex de Waal =

British academic

Alex de Waal OBE
- Born: Alexander William Lowndes de Waal; February 22, 1963 (age 63); Cambridge
- Education: The King's School, Canterbury; University of Oxford
- Occupations: Human rights activist, author, academic
- Organization(s): World Peace Foundation, The Fletcher School, Tufts University
- Father: Victor de Waal
- Relatives: Edmund de Waal, Thomas de Waal (brothers)

Alexander William Lowndes de Waal (born 22 February 1963) is a British anthropologist and the executive director of the World Peace Foundation at the Fletcher School of Law and Diplomacy at Tufts University. He is an authority on famine and has worked on the Horn of Africa since the 1980s as a researcher and practitioner. He was listed among Foreign Policy's 100 most influential international intellectuals in 2008 and Atlantic's 29 'brave thinkers' in 2009 and is the winner of the Huxley Award of the Royal Anthropological Institute in 2024.

Previously, he was a fellow of the Harvard Humanitarian Initiative at Harvard University, as well as program director at the Social Science Research Council on AIDS in New York City.

== Early life and education ==
De Waal was born in Cambridge, United Kingdom to Victor de Waal, an Anglican priest, and Esther Aline Lowndes-Moir, an author. He attended The King's School, Canterbury. He graduated with a BA in Psychology with Philosophy from Corpus Christi College, Oxford in 1984 going on to receive a DPhil in social anthropology from Nuffield College, Oxford in 1988.

== Famine Expertise ==
De Waal has worked on famine since he began fieldwork for his DPhil in social anthropology on how rural people in Sudan understood famine and adopted coping strategies to try to survive it. A revised version of his dissertation was published as Famine that Kills: Darfur, Sudan, 1984-1985. This was influential in developing the concept of famine as a threat to a way of life, and contributed to the study of livelihood coping strategies and survival strategies. It also framed famine mortality as the outcome of health crises as well as starvation per se.

In the 1990s, de Waal focused on the intersection between human rights violations and famine, including censorship and the use of starvation as a weapon of war.

He was sharply critical of the role of humanitarian organizations in downplaying the politics and criminality of famine, arguing that an anti-famine political contract was the route towards famine prevention. This was the core theme of his 1997 book, Famine Crimes: Politics and the Disaster Relief Industry in Africa. This book influenced a generation of researchers, students and aid practitioners to think critically about role of humanitarians in obscuring the underlying reasons for famine.

In the 2010s, de Waal returned to the topic of famine, posing the question, why the number and virulence of famines had declined, and what action was necessary to abolish them for good. His paper 'The End of Famine' in Political Geography, was the winner of the Elsevier Atlas Prize for 2017.

By the time of the publication of his book Mass Starvation: The history and future of famine, later in 2017 de Waal was more pessimistic, noting that famines were making a comeback. He attributed this to the increasing use of starvation as a weapon of war, characterizing them as 'the new atrocity famines.' Subsequently, he explained the increasing use of weaponized hunger as a product of changing global political economy and an accompanying normative shift, more permissive towards starvation.

With his colleague at the World Peace Foundation, Bridget Conley, and the legal group Global Rights Compliance, de Waal pushed for stronger legal measures to call perpetrators of starvation to account.

De Waal has exposed and condemned the use of starvation as a weapon in Tigray, Ethiopia, Sudan and Gaza.

== Human rights activism ==
De Waal joined Africa Watch (later renamed Human Rights Watch-Africa) in 1989, authoring reports on Sudan, Ethiopia, and Somalia including on starvation as a weapon of war in all three of those countries. He resigned from Africa Watch in December 1992 in protest at Human Rights Watch's decision to support the US Operation Restore Hope, which sent American troops to Somalia.

With his colleague Rakiya Omaar, who was fired as director of Africa Watch at the same time, de Waal set up African Rights, a small human rights NGO in London. African Rights hit the headlines for its exposure of human rights violations by the international forces in Somalia.

The United Nations military attorney for the UN Operation in Somalia accused de Waal of 'supporting the propaganda efforts of the USC [United Somali Congress]' when he was researching a report, 'Somalia: Human Rights Abuses by the United Nations Forces.' The report caused particular controversy in Belgium, where the Belgian army first denied that its paratroopers were responsible for any abuses, and later admitted that they had occurred when photographic evidence emerged.

African Rights took a lead in documenting the genocide in Rwanda, publishing a report Rwanda: Death, Despair and Defiance, with scores of first hand testimonies within weeks of the atrocities. The testimonies were collected by Rakiya Omaar, who was in Rwanda, interviewing survivors, sometimes on the very day they escaped from the genocidaires, assisted by de Waal who was in London.

De Waal continued to work on Sudan, particularly on the then-neglected case of the Nuba Mountains, organizing the first mission to document abuses there, which led to the report, Facing Genocide: The Nuba of Sudan, and a BBC documentary by the journalist Julie Flint. De Waal reflected on the challenges of documenting genocide as it unfolds in an article in Boston Review.

In 1998 de Waal left African Rights and founded a new organization, Justice Africa, with Tajudeen Abdul-Raheem, Yoanes Ajawin and Paulos Tesfagiorgis. African Rights co-hosted a series of conferences on peace and human rights in Sudan, bringing civil society voices to the peace process.

It campaigned against the war between Ethiopia and Eritrea, sponsoring a case at the African Court of Human and People's Rights against Ethiopia for the expulsion of Eritreans. It convened workshops on the peace and security challenges facing Africa.

== Pandemic Expertise ==
De Waal left Justice Africa to work on HIV and AIDS in Africa, playing a leading role in the UN Economic Commission for Africa's Commission on HIV/AIDS and Governance in Africa, the Social Science Research Council report on AIDS, Conflict and Security, and the Harvard University-led Joint Learning Initiative on Children and HIV/AIDS. De Waal later reflected on how the worst predictions for political and security crises arising from the HIV and AIDS epidemic in Africa had turned out to be erroneous.

At the onset of the Covid-19 pandemic, de Waal wrote an essay for Boston Review drawing lessons from the politics of the 1890s cholera epidemic in Hamburg, which he later expanded into a book, New Pandemics, Old Politics, arguing that each pandemic should be seen also as a societal 'pandemy', with subtle but far-reaching social and political implications.

== Interviews with former Tigray People's Liberation Front members ==
In the outset of the Tigray War, de Waal and Mulugeta Gebrehiwot published reports surrounding the situation in Tigray with regards to Eritrea's involvement.

== Published works ==
=== Books ===
- Famine that Kills : Darfur, Sudan, Oxford : Clarendon Press, 1989, ISBN 0-19-827749-0 (Revised edition, 2005, ISBN 0-19-518163-8)
- War in Sudan: An Analysis of Conflict, London : Peace in Sudan Group, 1990
- Evil days : thirty years of war and famine in Ethiopia, New York: Human Rights Watch, 1991, ISBN 1-56432-038-3
- Facing Genocide: The Nuba of Sudan, London: African Rights, July 1995, ISBN 1-899477-04-7
- Famine crimes : politics & the disaster relief industry in Africa, London : African Rights & the International African Institute, 1997, ISBN 0-253-21158-1
- Who fights? who cares?: war and humanitarian action in Africa, editor, Trenton, NJ: Africa World Press, 2000, ISBN 0-86543-864-1
- The Phoenix State: Civil Society and the Future of Sudan, Editor with A.H. Abdel Salam, 2001, ISBN 1-56902-143-0
- Demilitarizing the mind: African agendas for peace and security, Editor, Trenton, NJ & Asmara, Eritrea : Africa World Press, 2002, ISBN 0-86543-988-5
- Young Africa: realising the rights of children and youth, Editor with Nicolas Argenti, Trenton, NJ: Africa World Press, 2002, ISBN 0-86543-842-0
- When peace comes: civil society and development in Sudan, Editor with Yoanes Ajawin, Trenton, NJ: Africa World Press, 2002, ISBN 1-56902-164-3
- Islamism and its enemies in the Horn of Africa, Editor, Bloomington: Indiana University Press, 2004, ISBN 0-253-21679-6
- Darfur : a short history of a long war, With Julie Flint, New York : Zed Books, 2005, ISBN 1-84277-697-5
- AIDS and power : Why there is no political crisis—yet, New York : Zed Books, 2006, ISBN 1-84277-707-6
- War in Darfur and the search for peace (edited), Cambridge : Harvard University Press, 2007, ISBN 978-0-674-02367-3
- The real politics of the Horn of Africa: Money, war and the business of power, Polity Press, 2015, ISBN 978-0-7456-9557-0
- Advocacy in Conflict: Critical Perspectives on Transnational Activism (edited), Zed Books.
- Mass Starvation: The History and Future of Famine, Polity Press, 2017
- New Pandemics, Old Politics: Two Hundred Years of War on Disease and its Alternatives - Polity Books (2021)
- Sudan's Unfinished Democracy w/ Justin Lynch and Alex De Waal - Published 2022.
