= Robert Willis (priest) =

English Anglican theologian (1947–2024)

The Very Reverend Robert Willis KStJ DL
- Dean of Canterbury
- Church: Church of England
- Province: Province of Canterbury
- Diocese: Diocese of Canterbury
- In office: 1 July 2001 – 16 May 2022
- Predecessor: John Simpson
- Successor: David Monteith
- Other post: Dean of Hereford (1992–2000)

Orders
- Ordination: 1972 (deacon); 1973 (priest)

Personal details
- Born: Robert Andrew Willis; 17 May 1947
- Died: 22 October 2024 (aged 77) New Haven, Connecticut, U.S.
- Denomination: Anglicanism
- Partner: Fletcher Banner (2000–2024)
- Occupation: Theologian
- Education: Kingswood Grammar School
- Alma mater: University of Warwick; Worcester College, Oxford

Robert Andrew Willis, KStJ DL (17 May 1947 – 22 October 2024) was an English Anglican priest, theologian, chaplain and hymn writer.

Willis served as Dean of Canterbury from 2001 to 2022 and previously as Dean of Hereford between 1992 and 2000. In the beginning of the COVID-19 pandemic, after public worship was suspended, Willis received media attention for his popular daily video broadcasts of Morning Prayer from the deanery garden at Canterbury Cathedral.

== Early life and education ==
Willis was born on 17 May 1947 to Thomas Willis, who worked for an aircraft company, and Vera Britton. His elder sister Pauline (1939–2020) was a journalist who wrote for The Guardian.

Willis was educated at Kingswood Grammar School, near Bristol, before going up to Warwick University where he graduated with a BA degree. He then studied for ordination at Ripon College Cuddesdon and completed a Diploma in Theology (DipTh) at Worcester College, Oxford.

== Early ordained ministry ==
Willis was ordained in the Church of England as a deacon in 1972 and a priest in 1973. He served as curate of St Chad's, Shrewsbury, from 1972 to 1975 and was a vicar choral of Salisbury Cathedral and chaplain of Salisbury Cathedral School from 1975 to 1978. From 1978 to 1987 he was team rector of Tisbury, Wiltshire, and served as chaplain of Cranborne Chase School and RAF Chilmark.

In 1987 Willis became vicar of Sherborne Abbey, a former cathedral and abbey in Dorset. In addition, he was chaplain to Sherborne School for Girls. He was appointed canon and prebendary of Salisbury Cathedral in 1988 and served as rural dean of Sherborne from 1991 to 1992.

In November 1992 Willis was instituted as Dean of Hereford, primus inter pares (first among equals) of the governing body of Hereford Cathedral. In addition, he was priest-in-charge of St John's Church, Hereford.

In 1995 he became a member of the General Synod of the Church of England, and in 1999 he was elected chairman of the Deans' and Provosts' Conference. He continued to chair its successor, the Deans' Conference, when it was created in 2002.

== Dean of Canterbury ==
In 2001 Willis was appointed Dean of Canterbury, the 39th holder of the office since the Reformation. His installation took place on 1 July 2001.

During his tenure he oversaw the enthronement of two Archbishops of Canterbury (Rowan Williams in 2003 and Justin Welby in 2013) and arrangements for the 14th Lambeth Conference in 2008.

=== COVID-19 pandemic broadcasts ===
During the COVID-19 pandemic, the Church of England suspended public worship. In response, Willis, filmed by his partner, Fletcher Banner, began to broadcast religious services from the deanery garden at Canterbury Cathedral. His video recordings of the daily service of Morning Prayer have been watched by thousands of people around the world who dubbed themselves the "Garden Congregation". By the time the Dean retired in May 2022, he had produced well over 900 broadcasts and had cumulatively accrued millions of views on YouTube and other platforms worldwide, reaching many who needed a point of contact, spiritual or otherwise, in the dark days of the lockdowns. The broadcasts were also downloaded and shared between Christian communities in parts of the world where it is dangerous for them to gather together or worship openly. The broadcasts followed the traditional pattern of daily morning prayer in the Anglican Church, built around the daily reading of Scripture and saying the psalms. The interweaving of all aspects of human history and creativity in arts, music, philosophy, literature into these services which were filmed all over the house and gardens from the pigsty to the roof, gained global appeal. The broadcasts celebrated noteworthy days such as Thanksgiving, Jewish New Year and Chinese New Year, making them truly global and ecumenical, and the content drew heavily on the Dean's fifty years of ministry experience and keen concern for nature and the environment to draw attention to issues around the world.

In May 2020 Willis received international media attention when his cat, Leo, walked between his legs and under his cassock. A similar incident occurred in July 2020, when another one of his cats, Tiger, began to drink from a jug of milk that had been positioned next to him. A third incident occurred during Willis' broadcast on Shrove Tuesday 2021, when Tiger stole a pancake that was next to Willis.

=== Retirement and legacy ===
On 16 February 2022, it was announced that Willis would retire as Dean of Canterbury on 16 May. This was the day before his 75th birthday, and the Church of England insisted on observing its rule of compulsory retirement at that age. At the Cathedral's Evensong service on Sunday, 15 May 2022, the Archbishop of Canterbury, Justin Welby, publicly thanked Dean Willis for his many years of service.

Welby described Willis as "one of the most exceptional deans of the post-war period – overseeing Canterbury Cathedral’s life of worship, prayer and witness with creativity and imagination". In particular, he praised him for his online ministry during the COVID-19 pandemic, which "brought the comfort and hope of Jesus Christ to many thousands of people around the world". In January 2023 Welby conferred the title of Dean Emeritus of Canterbury on Willis.

The journalist Charles Moore, describing Willis as the last "great dean", wrote: "His voice was mellifluous, and he could preach in perfect sentences without need of notes, relating current events to a biblical text without strain, triviality or over-personalisation". He was acquainted with every corner of Canterbury Cathedral and its history, and enjoyed showing visitors around.

Willis travelled widely in retirement, preaching at cathedrals and churches around the world, especially in North America, including Washington National Cathedral in Washington, D.C., the Cathedral of Saint Philip in Atlanta, Georgia, Saint Thomas Church in New York City, Christ Church in Greenwich, Connecticut, and various places of worship in the Anglican Diocese of Toronto. He also became a resident fellow at Berkeley Divinity School at Yale, in New Haven, Connecticut.

== Hymn writing ==
Willis wrote a number of hymns, some of which have been published in the latest edition of Hymns Ancient and Modern and The Revised English Hymnal. His hymns include "Let Us Light a Candle", "Earth's Fragile Beauties We Possess" and "The Kingdom is Upon You". He also wrote the Christmas carol "Heaven Responds at Bethlehem", set to a tune by George Butterworth, which was sung for the first time by the Canterbury Cathedral girls' choir at the cathedral's carol services in 2016.

An accomplished pianist and opera enthusiast, Willis served as an Honorary Patron of the Kent-based Caritas Chamber Choir.

== Personal life and death ==
Willis was in a civil partnership with Fletcher Banner from the early 2000s.

On 22 October 2024, at the age of 77, Willis died "suddenly and peacefully" as a result of heart failure while in New Haven, Connecticut.

His funeral was held at Christ Church in New Haven on 13 November 2024, and was attended by the Most Rev. Michael Curry, former Presiding Bishop of the Episcopal Church of America, the Most Rev. Anne Germond, Primate of the Anglican Church of Canada, the Rt. Rev. Jeffrey Mello, Bishop of Connecticut, and the Very Rev. Randolph Hollerith, Dean of Washington National Cathedral. This was followed by an Evensong service in Willis's memory on 2 February 2025 (Candlemas) at Salisbury Cathedral in England, with a sermon preached by the former Archbishop of Canterbury, Rowan Williams.

== Honours ==
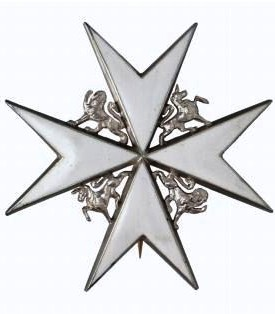

A Chaplain of the Order of St John since 1991, Willis was appointed a Commander of the Order of St John (CStJ) in 2001 and promoted to Knight (KStJ) in 2009. In 2011 he was appointed a Deputy Lieutenant for the county of Kent, and was awarded the Cross of St Augustine by the Archbishop of Canterbury, Dr Rowan Williams, in 2012.

Willis was awarded an honorary doctorate of Divinity (DD) by the Berkeley Divinity School at Yale University in 2009 and an honorary doctorate of Civil Law (DCL) by the University of Kent in 2011.

In 2021 Willis was elected a Fellow of the Royal School of Church Music (FRSCM).

Church of England titles
Preceded by Peter Haynes	Dean of Hereford; 1992–2000	Succeeded by Michael Tavinor
Preceded by John Simpson	Dean of Canterbury; 2001–2022	Succeeded by David Monteith
