= Justice Africa =

- Formation: 1999
- Location: London, United Kingdom
- Board Members & Trustees: Dawit Mesfin, Alex de Waal, Michela Wrong, Andre Zaaiman, Paulos Tesfagiorgis
- Website: www.justiceafrica.org

Justice Africa is a non-governmental organisation which seeks to promote social justice and human rights in Africa. It was established in 1999, to ensure that the vision of a Pan-African civil society came to fruition. Justice Africa’s programmes are guided by the slogan: “nothing for us, without us”.

The organisation believes in the importance of civil society ownership of the democratic process, in order to sustain peace and guarantee human rights. To achieve this end, Justice Africa works with governments, civil society actors as well as, local communities to build strong judicial frameworks, encourage the democratic process and promote peace.

== History ==
Initially, Justice Africa's work was focused on the Horn of Africa but it later expanded to include the Great Lakes region too. As its regional focus expanded, so did the network of civil society organizations with which it engages. Today, Justice Africa is even working in partnership with the African Union to build a human rights memorial in memory of various atrocities such as the Rwandan genocide, Ethiopian Red Terror, Apartheid, Colonialism and the Slave Trade.

== Mission ==
Justice Africa's stated mission is to "ensure inclusive participation of local actors and civil society in decision-making processes which affect their lives." When designing and implementing programmes, Justice Africa consults with communities and civil society to ensure that its programmes are locally owned. It also encourages participation of all stakeholders that are involved in a programme, so that they can influence the decision making process, which affects them. Justice Africa operates impartially and has only one objective: to sustain peace.

== Objectives ==
Justice Africa seeks to:

- Support civil society organizations in promoting justice, democracy, human rights and peace
- Conduct independent research and policy analysis
- Provoke debate in relation to methods of resolving conflict in Africa
- Forge of links between local, regional and international Pan-African actors
- Organise conferences, publish books and meet directly with policy makers to improve understanding of issues pertinent to the continent and help resolve them
- Memorialise human rights atrocities and genocides in Africa

== Publications ==
Justice Africa has published various books including the following:

- African Arguments, which is a joint publishing initiative by Justice Africa, the International African Institute, the Royal African Society and Zed Books. These books emphasize the political issues faced by Africans.
- War in Darfur and the Search for Peace. A book which examines the causes of the Darfur war, and which subsequently discusses the international efforts to achieve peace in Darfur.
- Demilitarizing the mind: African Agendas for Peace and Security. This book looks at the militarization of governance.
- Who fights? Who cares?: War and Humanitarian Action in Africa. A book discussing the huge political and humanitarian challenges faced by Africa.
- Young Africa: Realizing the Rights of Children and Youth. The book holds innovative ways of thinking about rights of young people and children in Africa and provides new approaches to dealing with the violations of the rights of young Africans.
