= Ian White-Thomson =

Ian Hugh White-Thomson (18 December 1904 – 11 January 1997) was an Anglican priest and Dean of Canterbury from 1963 to 1976.

The son of a former Bishop of Ely, White-Thomson was educated at Harrow School, where he was a Monitor and in the Football XI, and Brasenose. He was ordained after a period of study at Ripon College Cuddesdon in 1930 and began his career as a Curate at St Mary's, Ashford, Kent. After this he was Rector of St Martin and St Paul, Canterbury then Chaplain to three successive Archbishops of Canterbury. He was a governor of his old school from 1947 to 1962 and archdeacon of Northumberland from 1955 to 1963. In 1971 was made an honorary doctor of civil law by the University of Kent; and in 1976 a Freeman of the City of Canterbury.

Church of England titles
Preceded by Hewlett Johnson	Dean of Canterbury; 1963 – 1976	Succeeded by Victor de Waal
