= John Le Neve =

English antiquary

John Le Neve (1679–1741) was an English antiquary, known for his Fasti Ecclesiæ Anglicanæ ("Feasts of the Anglican Church"), a work of English church biography which has been published in many subsequent editions.

== Origins ==
He was born on 27 December 1679 in Great Russell Street, Bloomsbury, London, the only son of John Le Neve (d.1693, buried in Westminster Abbey 2 August 1693), by his second wife Amy Bent (d.12 December 1687), daughter of John Bent of London, a member of the Worshipful Company of Merchant Taylors. His grandfather, another John Le Neve, resided firstly at Cavendish, Suffolk and later in St Martin-in-the-Fields, London. His father's first wife had been Frances Monck (1633-1677), buried in Westminster Abbey, a daughter of Colonel Thomas Monck of Potheridge, Devon, the brother of General George Monck, 1st Duke of Albemarle (1608-1670), by whom he had a daughter Mary le Neve, who died an infant. His uncle Richard le Neve (d.1673) was a sea-captain who died in action against the Dutch in 1673 and was buried in Westminster Abbey, while another of his uncles, Edmund le Neve (d. 1689), was a barrister of the Middle Temple.

== Youth and education ==
Le Neve's mother died on 12 December 1687, when he was eight years old, and at the age of twelve he was sent to Eton College as an oppidan. His father died on 20 July 1693 when Le Neve was fourteen, and was buried in Westminster Abbey, as were both his wives. He succeeded to a small amount of property and became a ward of his kinsman (whose exact relationship to him has not been traced) Peter Le Neve (1661-1729), the herald and antiquary. Another of his guardians was his first cousin John Boughton, whose sister he married in 1699. From Eton he went to Trinity College, Cambridge, where he was admitted in 1694 and matriculated in 1696, but left without taking a degree.

== Career ==
All his works were loss-making, and he fell into difficulties. At the age of 41 he took holy orders and in January 1722 was presented by his patron William Fleetwood to the rectory of Thornton-le-Moor in Lincolnshire. His creditors pursued him and in December 1722 he was imprisoned in Lincoln gaol for insolvency.

== Marriage and progeny ==
Le Neve married by licence dated 25 January 1698–9 at St George the Martyr, Southwark, his first cousin Frances Boughton, second daughter of Thomas Boughton of King's Cliffe, Northamptonshire by his wife Elizabeth Le Neve, sister of Le Neve's father. By his wife Le Neve had eight children.

== Death ==
He died at some time before 23 May 1741.

== Works ==
- Memoirs etc. His first work seems to have been published in 1712-14 This was probably suggested to him by his kinsman Peter, whose collections were at his service.
- Fasti Ecclesiæ Anglicanæ. Le Neve's major work, his Fasti Ecclesiæ Anglicanæ, or an Essay towards a regular Succession of all the principal Dignitaries, &c., appeared in 1716 in folio. It borrowed from White Kennett's Collections, but depended also on original research. Before the end of the century twenty copies existed which had been annotated and brought up to date by other antiquaries. Browne Willis tried to convince Le Neve to update his first publication. John Gutch was urged to edit a new edition. In 1854 Thomas Duffus Hardy published at Oxford an expanded edition in three volumes, in which Le Neve's 11,051 entries were extended to 30,000.
- Life of Dr Field. In 1716 Le Neve also published in London his Life of Dr. Field, Dean of Gloucester, of which he is known only to have written the preface.
- Monumenta Anglicana. In 1717 he published his Monumenta Anglicana (Monumenta Anglicana, being Inscriptions on the Monuments of several eminent Persons deceased in or since the year 1700 to the end of the year 1715, deduced into a series of time by way of Annals; at the end of which year is added an Obituary of some memorable Persons who died therein, whose Inscriptions (if any yet set up) are not come to hand). He quotes largely from MSS. P. L., being the manuscript diary of Peter Le Neve, later printed in part in the Transactions of the Norfolk and Norwich Archaeological Society. Many of the inscriptions were communicated by the monumental masons who set them up. In his preface he states that he was prompted by John Weever's 'Funerall Monuments,' published in 1631. In 1718 he issued separately two more volumes, covering the periods 1650-1679 and 1680-1699. In 1718 appeared a fourth volume, covering the period 1600-49, and he announced that he was making collections of the same sort, beginning at the year 1400, but these collections were never printed. Later in that year he issued a fifth volume, containing a supplement of monuments between 1650 and 1718.
- Lives and Characters. In 1720 he published in two parts The Lives and Characters ... of all the Protestant Bishops of the Church of England since the Reformation.
