= Victor de Waal =

British Anglican priest

The Very Reverend Victor de Waal
- Dean of Canterbury
- Church: Church of England
- Installed: 1976
- Term ended: 1986
- Predecessor: Ian White-Thomson
- Successor: John Simpson

Personal details
- Born: Victor Alexander de Waal; 2 February 1929 (age 97)
- Denomination: Anglicanism
- Parents: Hendrik de Waal; Elisabeth von Ephrussi
- Spouse: Esther Aline Lowndes-Moir
- Children: Alex de Waal; Edmund de Waal; Thomas de Waal
- Education: Tonbridge School; Pembroke College, Cambridge

Victor Alexander de Waal (born 2 February 1929) is a British Anglican priest. He was the Dean of Canterbury from 1976 to 1986.

== Early life ==
Victor de Waal was born in Amsterdam, the son of Hendrik de Waal, a Dutch businessman, and Elisabeth of the Ephrussi family. His mother was born to a well-known Jewish family at the Ephrussi Palace in Vienna. Although she converted to Christianity this did not protect her from the racial policy of Nazi Germany. Before the outbreak of World War II, the family moved to Britain and stayed there after the war, though retaining for many years their Dutch citizenship.

The family came to live in Tunbridge Wells when he was a boy and he was educated at Tonbridge School and Pembroke College, Cambridge. His second cousin once removed was the Right Revd Hugo de Waal, Bishop of Thetford.

== Career ==
He served as chaplain of King's College, Cambridge from 1959 to 1963 and the University of Nottingham from 1963 to 1969, and chancellor of Lincoln Cathedral.

From 1976 to 1986, he served as the Dean of Canterbury.

He helped with the research into his family history by his son, Edmund de Waal, which culminated in the book The Hare with Amber Eyes.

De Waal is an Honorary Fellow of the Institute of Advanced Research in the Humanities and Social Sciences of the University of Birmingham.

== Personal life ==
He married Esther Aline Lowndes-Moir, author (as Esther de Waal) of books on spirituality, especially Celtic. Among their sons are John de Waal, a barrister; Alex de Waal (born 1963), a writer on Africa; Edmund de Waal (born 1964), a ceramic artist; and Thomas de Waal (born 1966), a writer. He later separated from his wife.

== Works ==
- What is the Church, 1969, SCM Press.
- The Politics of Reconciliation - Zimbabwe's first decade, 1990
