= Robert Tounson =

Witness to Sir Walter Raleigh execution (1575–1621)

The Right Reverend Robert Tounson
- Bishop of Salisbury
- Church: Church of England
- Installed: 1620
- Term ended: 1621
- Predecessor: Martin Fotherby
- Successor: John Davenant
- Other posts: Dean of Westminster

Personal details
- Born: 1575
- Died: 1621 (aged 45–46)
- Denomination: Anglicanism
- Occupation: Churchman

Robert Tounson (1575 – 15 May 1621) — also seen as “Townson” and “Toulson” — was Dean of Westminster from 1617 to 1620, and later Bishop of Salisbury from 1620 to 1621. He attended Sir Walter Raleigh at his execution, and wrote afterwards of how Raleigh had behaved on that occasion.

== Life ==
He was baptised on 8 January 1576 in the parish of St Botolph, Cambridge. He was admitted a sizar of Queens' College, Cambridge, on 28 December 1587. He graduated M.A. in 1595, was elected a fellow on 2 September 1597, and was incorporated at Oxford on 10 July 1599, proceeding B.D. in 1602, and D.D. in 1613. On 13 April 1604 he was presented to the vicarage of Wellingborough in Northamptonshire, and on 16 February 1607 by William Tate to the rectory of Old in the same county, which he retained till 1620.

He was also appointed a Royal Chaplain, and on 16 December 1617 was installed Dean of Westminster. In this capacity he attended Sir Walter Raleigh both in prison and on the scaffold, and described his 'last behaviour' in a letter to Sir John Isham. On 9 July 1620 he was consecrated bishop of Salisbury, died on 15 May 1621, and was buried in Westminster Abbey.

== Family ==
He was son of a Renold Toulnesonn, and uncle of Thomas Fuller, On 17 June 1604 he married Margaret, daughter of John Davenant, merchant of London, sister of John Davenant, who succeeded him as bishop of Salisbury, and widow of William Townley. By her he had a large family. Two sons, Robert and John, afterwards received preferment in their uncle Davenant's diocese. His daughter Gertrude married James Harris (1605–1679) of Salisbury, ancestor of the earls of Malmesbury. His daughter Mary married Alexander Hyde.

== Notes ==
Church of England titles
Preceded by Martin Fotherby	Bishop of Salisbury; 1620–1621	Succeeded by John Davenant
