= Dawit Mesfin =

Eritrean writer (born 1956)

Dawit Mesfin (born 1956) is an Eritrean writer, researcher and political analyst who campaigns for human rights and democracy in Eritrea. He is a founding father of Awate.com, a leading Eritrean website and served as a senior editor for Asmarino.com. He set up Voice of Liberty radio station, chaired diverse human rights and civil society groups focusing on Eritrea, and was principal director of Justice Africa, an international NGO with a special focus on the Horn of Africa, from 2011 to 2014.

His debut book, Woldeab Woldemariam: A Visionary Eritrean Patriot, A Biography documents the contribution made by a critically important figure in Eritrea's long history of asserting its identity as a nation.

Dawit Mesfin writes regularly for various Eritrean websites and other news media. He currently lives in London.
