= John Bargrave =

English author and collector

Arms of Bargrave: Or, on a pale gules a sword erect argent pomel and hilt of the field a chief azure charged with three bezants

John Bargrave (1610 – 11 May 1680), was an English author and collector and a canon of Canterbury Cathedral.

== Early life ==
Bargrave was born in Kent in 1610, the son of Captain John Bargrave and Jane Crouch. His sister Jane married Lodowick Wemyss, who was a church minister, and their child Anne Wemyss was a noted writer. Bargrave's father had fought in the war between the English and the Spanish and had returned to Bridge to raise a family. The Bargraves had recently come to be considered local gentry and this had resulted in the marriage of Bargrave Snr. and the daughter of London haberdasher, Giles Crouch, who later built an impressive family home known as Bifrons at nearby Patrixbourne. Bargrave (Jnr.) was a nephew of Isaac Bargrave, Dean of the Canterbury Cathedral.

== Education ==
Bargrave was first educated at The King's School, Canterbury and then at St. Peter's College at Cambridge. Bargrave became librarian there and then a fellow of the college in 1637. Bargrave's uncle Isaac was a strong supporter of the monarchy and thus the Cavaliers and at the outbreak of the English Civil War in 1642 he was imprisoned. He was released the following year but died soon after and John Bargrave was ejected from the fellowship of the college.

== In Europe ==
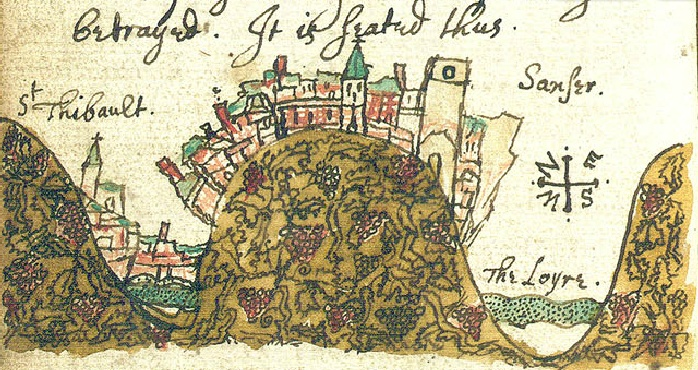
Detail of a page from John Bargrave's travel diary, showing the French wine-producing hilltop town of Sancerre in the centre, the Loire River on the right and the village of Saint-Thibault on the left.

Thereafter, Bargrave devoted his time chiefly to travelling across the European continent. In 1646 and 1647 he was in Italy with his nephew, John Raymond, author of an itinerary in which Bargrave is supposed to have had a considerable hand. He was again at Rome in 1650, 1655, and 1659–60 and observed the mechanisations (though not in any official capacity) of the papal conclave of 1655.

He experienced, first-hand, the power of the Roman Inquisition and was privy to the goings-on of the papal court in Rome; its cardinals, secular leaders and scandals.

== Later life ==
After the Restoration he obtained several preferments in Kent and in 1662 was made a canon of Canterbury.

Immediately after this promotion he departed with Archdeacon Selleck on the dangerous errand of ransoming English captives at Algiers, for whose redemption ten thousand pounds had been subscribed by the bishops and clergy. He acquitted himself successfully of his mission, and spent the rest of his life at home, dying at Canterbury on 11 May 1680.

In 1665 Bargrave married the well-connected childless widow, Frances Osborne (born Wilde).

== Written work ==
Bargrave's sole contribution to literature is a curious account called "Pope Alexander the Seventh and the College of Cardinals", originally written in 1660 while Bargrave was in Rome and not originally intended for publication.

The work consists of scraps selected from three anonymous contemporary Italian publications (La Giusta Statura de' Porporati, Il Nipotismo di Roma and Il Cardinalismo di Santa Chiesa; the last two by Gregorio Leti), with considerable additions of his own. The profiles were originally designed to illustrate a collection of portraits of the pope and cardinals published by Giovanni Giacomo de Rossi in 1657 called The Effigies.

Bargrave's work was edited by James Craigie Robertson for the Camden Society in 1867, with a memoir of Bargrave and a descriptive catalogue of the curiosities he had acquired in his travels. His cabinet of curiosities, complete with riding boots and a miniature of him and his young travelling tutees, Raymond and Alexander Chapman, by Matteo Bolgnini, survives intact in the Canterbury Cathedral Library.
