= Paulos Tesfagiorgis =

Eritrean activist

Paulos Tesfagiorgis is an Eritrean human rights activist. He established the only People's Front for Democracy and Justice (PFDJ) licensed Regional Centre for Human Rights and Development in Eritrea. Tesfagiorgis was also co-founder and head of the Eritrean Relief Association during the Eritrean War of Independence. He was awarded the Thorolf Rafto Memorial Prize in 2003 for his work.

== Early career after independence ==
During the Eritrean War of Independence Paulos Tesfagiorgis was the head of the Eritrean Relief Association, coordinating international aid for Eritreans, particularly during the 1983–1985 famine in Ethiopia. Following Eritrean independence, Tesfagiorgis was appointed to the commission which drafted Eritrea's constitution. The constitution was ratified in 1997. In 2002, Tesfagiorgis and 17 other Eritreans set up the Citizens Initiative for the Salvation of Eritrea (CISE).

=== Political views ===
In his paper A Personal Observation, Tesfagiorgis published an article titled “What Went Wrong?: The Eritrean People’s Liberation Front from Armed Opposition to State Governance.” In this piece, Tesfagiorgis explains his views on politics and democracy through a study of the evolution of the Eritrean People's Liberation Front (EPLF) from a liberating army into an oppressive state. The EPLF was initially successful in uniting Eritrean groups against Ethiopian occupation. However, the paper argues that towards the end of the liberation war, the EPLF failed to provide democracy after the war. Political dissent and news media were suppressed, leading to many Eritreans fleeing the country. Tesfagiorgis concludes that the ELPF's failure to adapt to a peacetime role and the president's actions led to tyranny and dashed hopes for a free and prosperous Eritrea.

He believes that only democratically elected governments have legitimacy, because they are always accountable to the people they govern. For this reason he also abstains from violence. He joined the UK-based nonpartisan activist group Eritrea Focus in 2018 to promote nonviolent transition to democratic rule.

=== Exile ===
Fearing for his safety due to his critical stance against the government's reluctance to democratize, Tesfagiorgis left Eritrea for London in April 2001. From his exile in London, and later in South Africa, Tesfagiorgis has been working for the advocacy organisation Justice Africa, and has spent much time working for agreements among other Eritrean dissidents on a nonviolent democratic alternative for Eritrea. In June 2015, a United Nations Commission on Human Rights of Inquiry accused Eritrean president Isaias Afwerki of systematic, widespread and gross human rights violations that may constitute crimes against humanity.

=== Education ===
Tesfagiorgis has a master's degree in law from McGill University, Canada and has been a lecturer in law at the University of Asmara, Eritrea.

In October 1991, while he was a Faculty of Law at McGIII University, Montreal, he wrote his thesis "Human Rights, Development and Non-Governmental Organizations in the Horn of Africa."

== Honors and awards ==
Paulos Tesfagiorgis was awarded the Thorolf Rafto Memorial Prize for 2003 for his work for human rights and democracy.
