= Nathanael Carpenter =

English author, philosopher, and geographer (1589–1628)

Nathanael Carpenter (7 February 1589 – c. 1628) was an English writer, philosopher, and geographer.

== Life ==
He was son of John Carpenter, rector of Northleigh, Devon. He matriculated at St. Edmund Hall, Oxford, on 7 June 1605; but was elected, on a recommendatory letter of James I, a Devonshire fellow of Exeter College on 30 June 1607. (A second Devonshire candidate, Michael Jermyn, obtained an equal number of votes; the vice-chancellor gave his decision in favour of Carpenter.) The dates of Carpenter's degrees were: Bachelor of Arts 5 July 1610, Master of Arts 1618, Bachelor of Divinity 11 May 1620, Doctor of Divinity 1626. During his residence at Oxford he is said to have become a noted philosopher, poet, mathematician, and geographer. One of his pupils at the university was Sir William Morice, secretary of state 1660–68, a politician with religious views similar to his tutor's Calvinism.

Matthew Sutcliffe nominated him a member of Chelsea College, and Archbishop James Ussher brought him to Ireland, where he was appointed schoolmaster of the king's wards in Dublin (wards being minors of property whose parents were Roman Catholics). Carpenter's death is said to have occurred at Dublin in the beginning of 1628, and his funeral sermon was preached by Robert Ussher.

== Works ==
His earliest work Philosophia libera triplici exercitationum decade proposita was an attack on Aristotelianism, and appeared at Frankfurt in 1621, under the pseudonym "N. C. Cosmopolitanus." Later editions were issued under his name in 1622, 1636, and 1675. His treatise of Geography Delineated Forth in Two Books was published in 1625, and republished in 1685. Three sermons entitled Achitophel, or the Picture of a Wicked Politician, preached to the University of Oxford and dedicated to James Ussher, appeared in 1627, 1628, 1629, 1638, 1638, and 1642. The first edition was called in, and the passages against Arminianism were removed. After his death there appeared (1633 and 1640) a sermon, Chorazin and Bethsaida's Woe, which he had preached at St. Mary's, Oxford. The dedication by N. H. was to Thomas Winniffe, and asserts that but for a kinsman the manuscript might have been lost on the Dutch shores, as Carpenter's works on optics were in the Irish Sea.
