= Martin Fotherby =

English clergyman

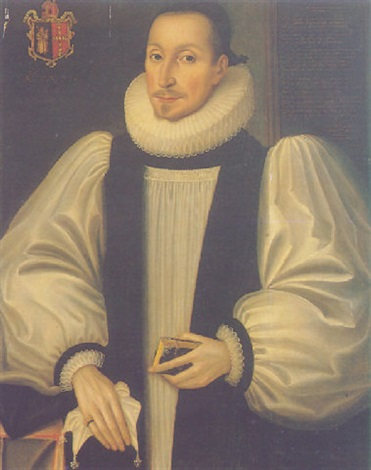
Martin Fotherby, Bishop of Salisbury

Martin Fotherby (c. 1560–1620) was an English clergyman, who became Bishop of Salisbury.

== Life ==
He was born in Grimsby, and studied at the University of Cambridge, where he became a Fellow of Trinity College.

He was rector of St Mary-le-Bow, and then in 1596 a prebendary of Canterbury Cathedral. He became Bishop of Salisbury in 1618 and died in London on 11 March 1620 and was buried two days later in All Hallows, Lombard Street. His brother Charles Fotherby was Archdeacon of Canterbury (1595–1615) and Dean of Canterbury (1615–1619).

== Works ==
His Atheomastix; clearing foure truthes, against atheists and infidels was published posthumously in 1622, a work written against atheism. According to the Cambridge History of English and American Literature, (1907–21), Volume VII, Fotherby "relied chiefly on St. Thomas Aquinas in his demonstration of the being of God, and maintained that there is a "natural prenotion" that there is a God." This work was the source of many of the poetic quotations occurring in The Generall Historie of Virginia, New-England, and the Summer Isles (1624), by John Smith of Jamestown.

== Notes ==
Church of England titles
Preceded by Robert Abbot	Bishop of Salisbury; 1618–1619	Succeeded by Robert Tounson
