= Charles Fotherby =

Church of England clergyman

Charles Fotherby (c. 1549 – 1619) was a Church of England clergyman who became Dean of Canterbury (1615–1619).

== Life ==
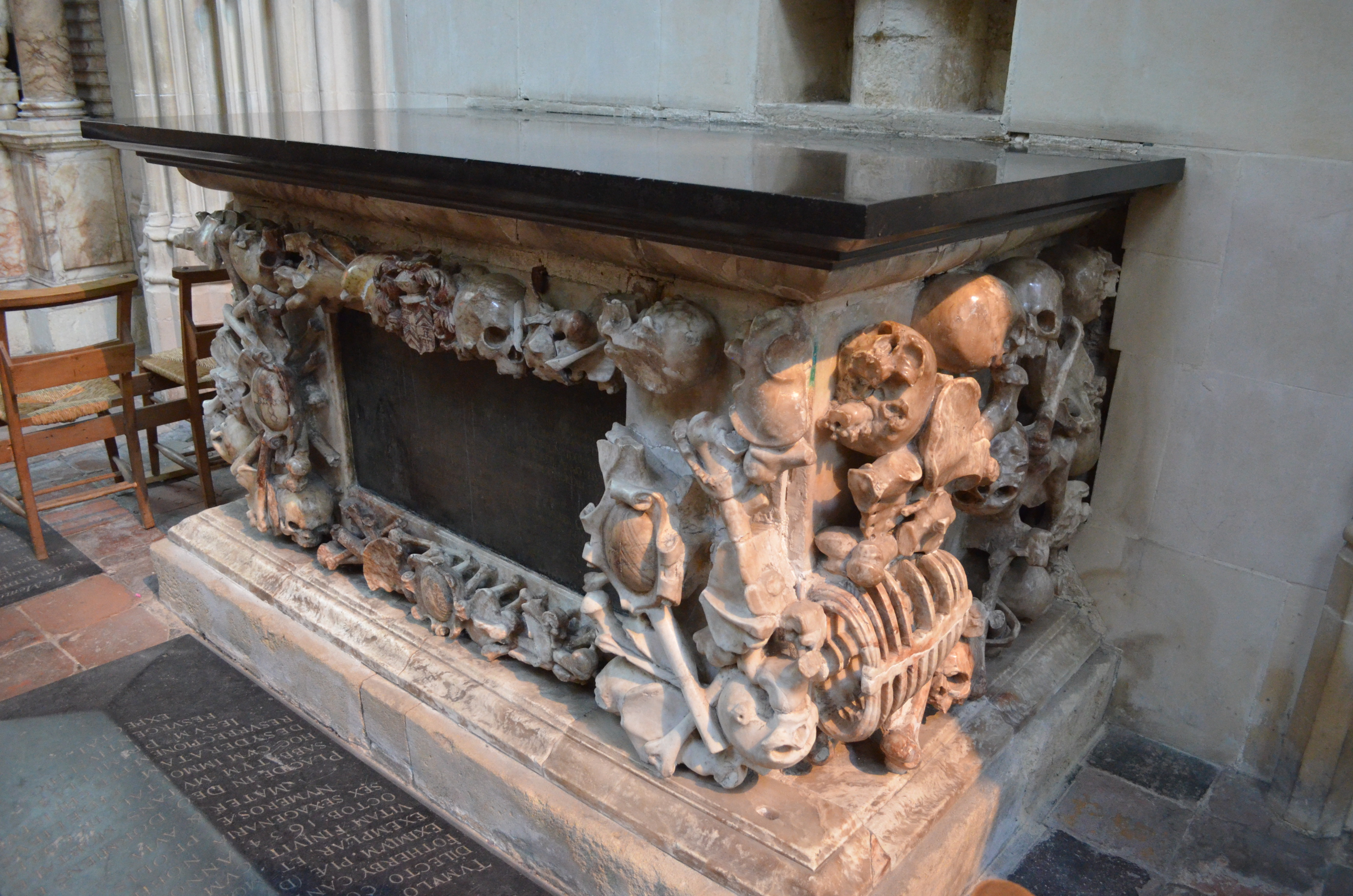
Tomb of Dean Charles Fotherby in Canterbury Cathedral

Fotherby's date of birth is not recorded but he is stated to have been 70 when he died. His father was Martin Fotherby of Great Grimsby in Lincolnshire. His younger brother, Dr Martin Fotherby (c.1560-1620), was also a prebendary of Canterbury, and later bishop of Salisbury.

He studied at Trinity College, Cambridge (sizar 1573, scholar 1575, B.A. 1576/77, M.A. 1580, B.D. 1587). He became a fellow of Trinity in 1579. He was vicar of several Kentish parishes and became Archdeacon of Canterbury and a prebendary of the Canterbury Cathedral in 1595 and Dean of Canterbury in 1615.

He married Cecilia Walker of Cambridge, by whom he had ten children, but only his eldest son, John, and four daughters survived him.

He died in 1619 and was buried in the Lady Chapel at Canterbury Cathedral. His monument is described as 'a bone-encrusted tomb-chest [which] is a fine example of that obsessive early seventeenth-century morbidity which repelled later, more squeamish observers'.

As Dean, he is recorded as reinvigorating the musical life of the Cathedral.

== Career ==
date	office	reference
1587–1592	Vicar of Chislet (Kent)	Venn, p. 165
1587	Vicar of Deal (Kent)	Venn, p. 165
1592–1619	Vicar of Aldington (Kent)	Venn, p. 165
1595–1600	Vicar of Teynham (Kent)	Venn, p. 165
1595–1619	Archdeacon of Canterbury	Fasti, III, iii. 15
1595–1615	Canon of 4th prebend, Canterbury Cathedral	Fasti, III, iii. 23
1600–1619	Rector of Bishopsbourne (Kent)	Venn, p. 165
1615–1619	Dean of Canterbury	Fasti, III, iii. 12

Church of England titles
Preceded by Thomas Nevile	Dean of Canterbury; 1615-1619	Succeeded by John Boys
