= Isaac Bargrave =

English royalist churchman

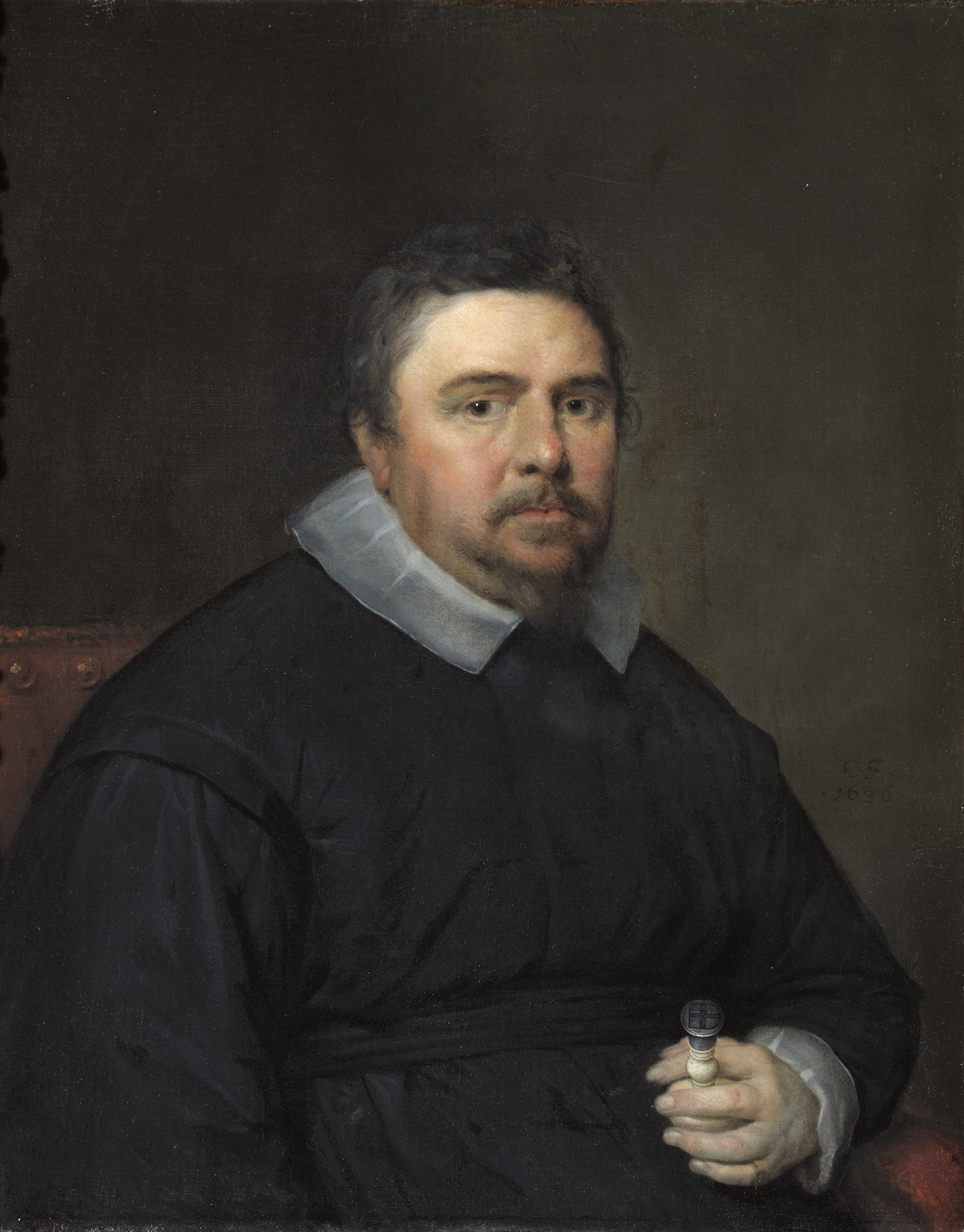
- A 1636 painting of Isaac Bargrave by Cornelis Janssens van Ceulen
- Born: 1586
- Died: January 1643, aged 56 or 57; Canterbury
- Resting place: Canterbury Cathedral; 51°16′47″N 1°04′59″E
- Years active: 1625-43

Isaac Bargrave (1586 – January 1643) was an English royalist churchman, Dean of Canterbury from 1625 to 1643.

== Life ==
Arms of Bargrave: Or, on a pale gules a sword erect argent pomel and hilt of the field a chief azure charged with three bezants

=== Early life ===
Isaac was the sixth son of Robert Bargrave, of Bridge, Kent, and was educated at Clare Hall, Cambridge, where he graduated B.A. and M.A. On 9 July 1611 he was incorporated M.A. of Oxford, and in the October following became rector of Eythorne. In 1612 he held the office of 'taxor' at Cambridge, and he acted in the Latin comedy Ignoramus performed at the university before James I on 8 March 1615 and written by George Ruggle of his college.

=== Chaplaincies ===
Shortly afterwards Bargrave went to Venice as chaplain to Sir Henry Wotton, the English ambassador there, and befriended Paolo Sarpi. In 1618 he returned to England with a letter of introduction from Wotton to the king. In 1622 he received the degree of D.D. at Cambridge, and was appointed a prebendary of Canterbury Cathedral. It was about the same time that he was granted the living of St. Margaret's, Westminster, and became chaplain to Prince Charles, an office which he retained after the prince ascended the throne in 1625.

=== Dean ===
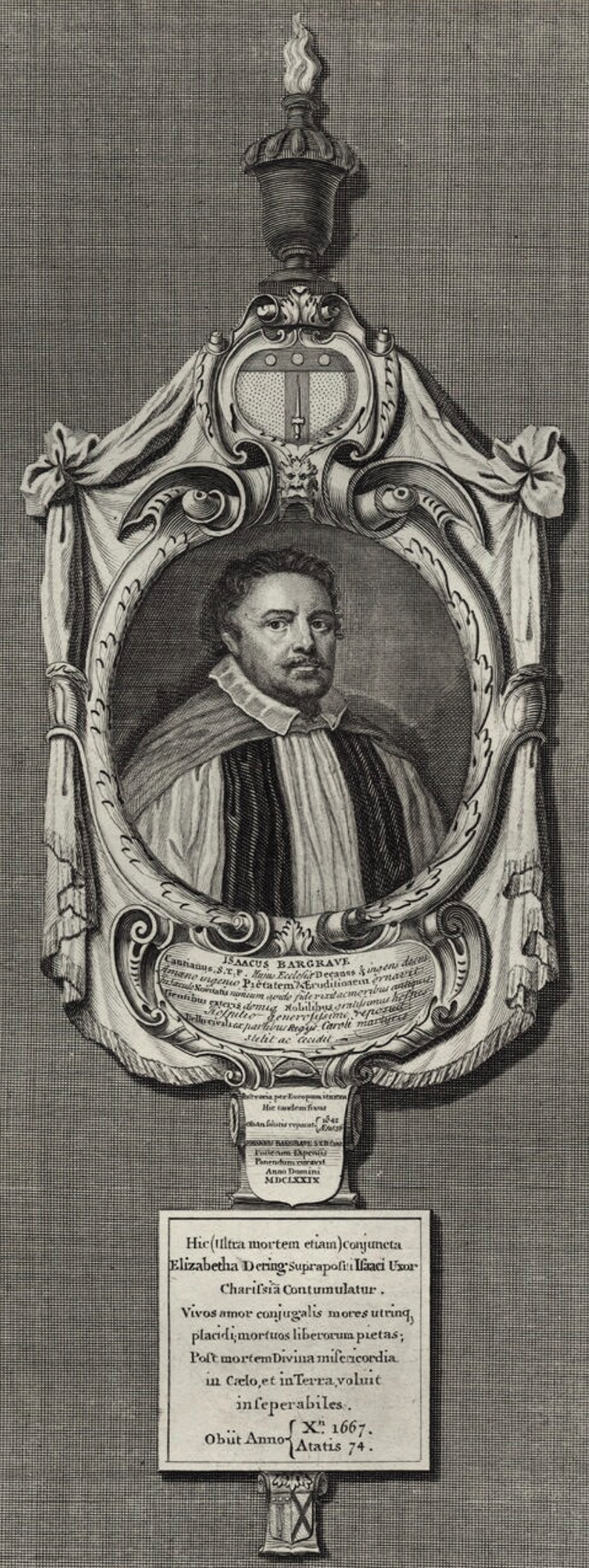
Mural monument to Isaac Bargrave in Canterbury Cathedral. Engraving by James Cole (1715-1774)

On the death of John Boys of Canterbury, who had married Bargrave's sister, Bargrave succeeded to the deanery, to which he was formally admitted on 16 October 1625. He obtained the vicarage of Tenterden in 1626, and was presented to the benefice of Lydd by the king in September 1627, but only held it for a few weeks. On 5 June 1628 he received the vicarage of Chartham, which he continued to hold till his death.

=== Controversies ===
In the last years of James I's reign Bargrave had preached a sermon which threw him into disfavour with the court; but as dean of Canterbury he supported the policy of Charles I. A sermon preached by him before Charles I on 27 March 1627 supported the collection of that year's arbitrary loan. In later years Bargrave did not live on good terms with his diocesan William Laud, or with the cathedral clergy. In 1634-5 he insisted on the Walloon congregation at Canterbury and the Belgian church of Sandwich conforming to the ritual of the church of England; but the archbishop did not approve of these orders. Bargrave claimed precedence over the deans of London and Westminster, and engaged in a dispute with William Somner, the registrar of the diocese.

Soon after the opening of the Long Parliament Bargrave became an object of attack. When the bill for the abolition of deans and chapters was introduced by Sir Edward Dering, the first cousin of his wife, he was fined £1,000 as a prominent member of convocation. On 12 May 1641 he went to the House of Commons to present petitions from the university of Cambridge and from the officers of Canterbury Cathedral against the bill. Although the bill was ultimately dropped, Bargrave's unpopularity increased.

=== Imprisonment & death ===
At the beginning of the First English Civil War, in August 1642, Edwin Sandys, a parliamentary colonel who had been on good terms with Bargrave, occupied the deanery. Bargrave was absent, but his wife and children were roughly treated; and Sandys arrested Bargrave at Gravesend, after which he spent time in the Fleet Prison After three weeks' imprisonment Bargrave was released without having been brought to trial. He returned to Canterbury and died there early in January 1643. He was buried in the dean's chapel of the cathedral. In 1679 a memorial was erected above the grave by the dean's nephew, John Bargrave, with a portrait painted on copper of the dean, attributed to Cornelius Jansen.

=== Family ===
Bargrave was married to Elizabeth, the daughter of Sir John Dering, of Pluckley, and first cousin of Sir Edward Dering. Of Bargrave's children one son, Thomas, married a niece of Sir Henry Wotton, and was an executor of Sir Henry's will.

== Works ==
Bargrave published three sermons: one preached from Psalms xxvi. 6 before the House of Commons 28 Feb. 1623–4; another preached from Hosea x. 1 at Whitehall in 1624, and a third preached from 1 Sam. xv. 23 before King Charles 29 March 1627.

Church of England titles
Preceded by John Boys	Dean of Canterbury; 1625-1643	Succeeded by George Aglionby
