= Dean of Canterbury =

Office in the Church of England

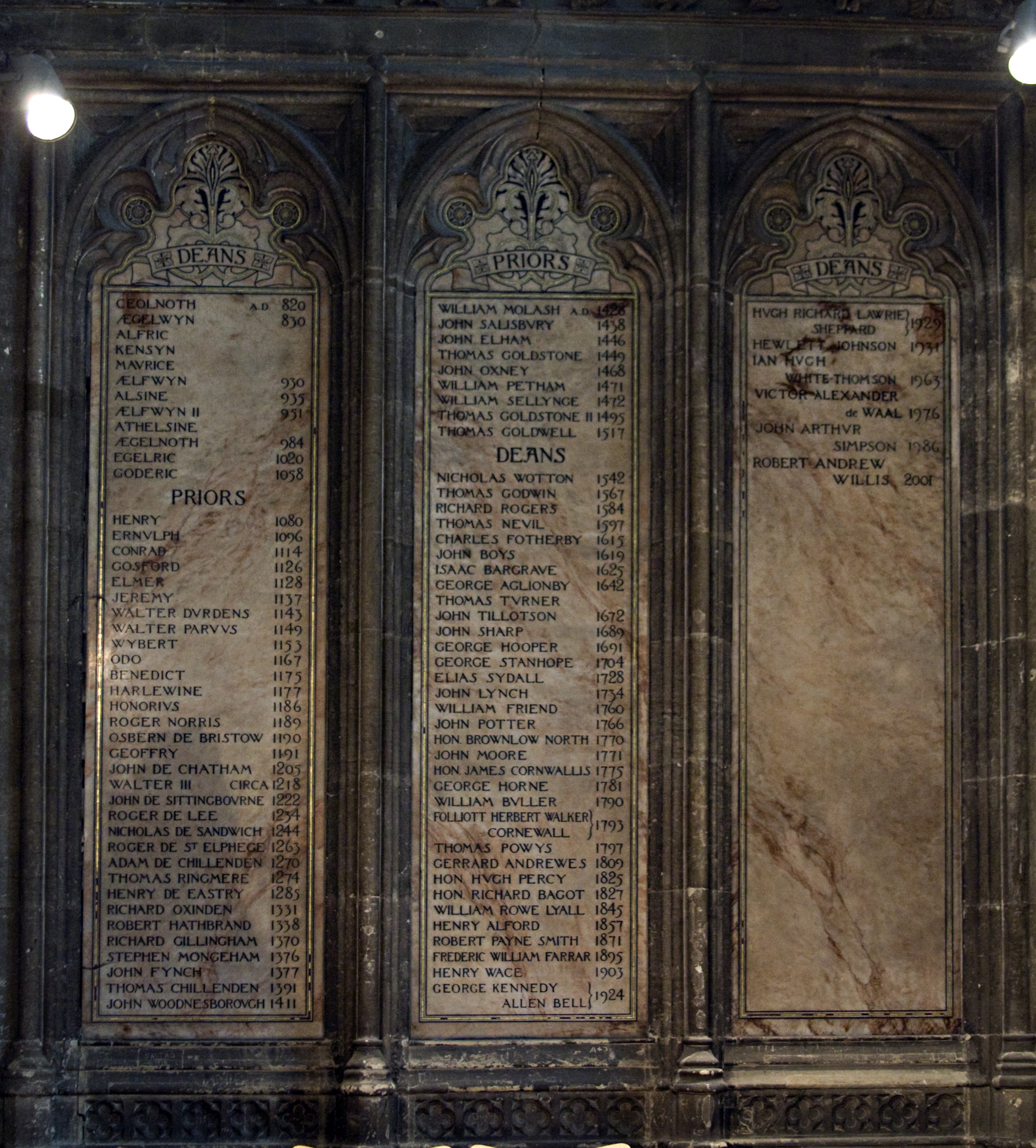
Inscribed panels in Canterbury Cathedral, listing the Deans of Canterbury

The dean of Canterbury is the head of the Chapter of the Cathedral of Christ Church, Canterbury, England. The current office of dean originated after the English Reformation, although deans had also existed before this time; its immediate precursor office was the prior of the cathedral-monastery.

The current dean, David Monteith was installed on 17 December 2022, and is the 40th dean since the Reformation, though the position of dean and prior as the religious head of the community is almost identical so the line is unbroken back to the time of the foundation of the community by Saint Augustine in AD 597. The previous dean, Robert Willis, was appointed in 2001 and retired on 16 May 2022, a day before his 75th birthday.

== List of deans ==
=== 820–1080 ===
==== Version on show in the Cathedral (west end) ====
- Ceolnoth 820
- Aegelwyn 830
- Alfric
- Kensyn
- Maurice
- Aelfwyn 930
- Alsine 935
- Aelfwyn II 951
- Athelsine
- Aegelnoth 984 (Æthelnoth, later Archbishop of Canterbury)
- Egelric 1020
- Goderic 1058
- Cuba, occurs 798
- Beornheard, occurs 805
- Heahfrith, occurs 813
- Ceolnoth, resigned 833
- Æthelwine, occurs c. 860
- Eadmund, occurs c.871
- Æthelnoth, resigned 1020
- Godric, occurs 1020, 1023
- Æthelric, resigned 1058
- Ælfric
- Ælfsige
- Ælfwine
- Ælfwine
- Kynsige
- Maurice

=== Priors of Canterbury ===
About a century after becoming a monastic foundation late in the 10th century, the cathedral started to be headed by a prior rather than a dean. It would next have a dean after the Dissolution of the Monasteries.

=== Post-Reformation deans ===
==== Early modern ====
- 1541–1567 Nicholas Wotton (the first dean; simultaneously Dean of York)
- 1567–1584 Thomas Godwin
- 1584–1597 Richard Rogers
- 1597–1615 Thomas Nevile
- 1615–1619 Charles Fotherby
- 1619–1625 John Boys
- 1625–1643 Isaac Bargrave
- 1643 George Aglionby
- 1643–1672 Thomas Turner
- 1672–1689 John Tillotson
- 1689–1691 John Sharp (afterwards Archbishop of York, 1691)
- 1691–1704 George Hooper
- 1704–1728 George Stanhope
- 1728–1733 Elias Sydall
- 1734–1760 John Lynch
- 1760–1766 William Freind
- 1766–1770 John Potter
- 1770–1771 Brownlow North
- 1771–1775 John Moore
- 1775–1781 The Hon James Cornwallis
- 1781–1790 George Horne
- 1790–1792 William Buller
- 1793–1797 Folliott Cornewall

==== Late modern ====
- 1797–1809 Thomas Powys
- 1809–1825 Gerrard Andrewes
- 1825–1827 Hugh Percy
- 1827–1845 Richard Bagot
- 1845–1857 William Lyall
- 1857–1871 Henry Alford
- 1871–1895 Robert Payne Smith
- 1895–1903 Frederic Farrar
- 1903–1924 Henry Wace
- 1924–1929 George Bell
- 1929–1931 Dick Sheppard
- 1931–1963 Hewlett Johnson
- 1963–1976 Ian White-Thomson
- 1976–1986 Victor de Waal
- 1986–2000 John Simpson
- 2000–2022 Robert Willis
- 2022−present David Monteith
