= William Freind =

Church of England cleric, Dean of Canterbury

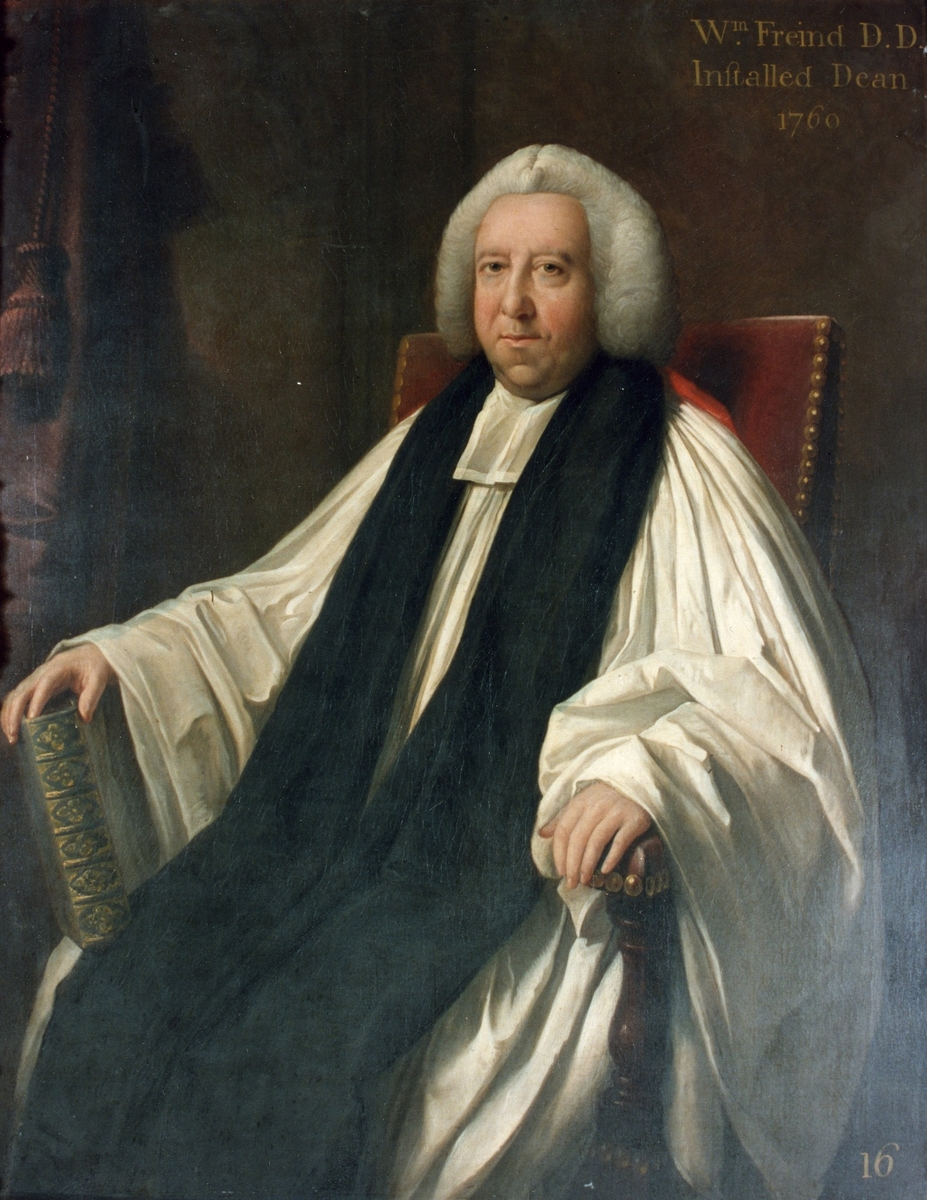
William Freind (c.1715–1766), Dean of Canterbury (1760–1766), painting attributed to Thomas Hudson, 1760.

William Freind (c.1715–1766) was an 18th-century Church of England clergyman who was Dean of Canterbury from 1760 to 1766.

== Life ==
He was the son of Robert Freind, headmaster of Westminster School and Jane, daughter of Samuel de L'Angle, prebendary of Westminster. The family name was also spelled 'Friend'.

He was educated at Westminster School (1727) and then at Christ Church, Oxford (1731; M.A. 1738). In 1739 his father resigned the rectory of Witney (Oxfordshire) in his favour. In 1744 he was appointed a prebendary of Westminster Abbey and chaplain-in-ordinary to George II. In 1747 he also became rector of Islip near Oxford, with a dispensation to hold the rectory of Witney simultaneously. He obtained the degrees of B.D. and D.D. in 1748. From 1756 to 1760, he was Canon of the third prebend at Christ Church, Oxford, and from 1760 to his death Dean of Canterbury.

Freind was married to Grace, daughter of William Robinson. Sir Richard Robinson, 1st Baron Rokeby was a brother-in-law. Todd records that 'He was a great Lover of Music, which he patronised and practised. Concerts at the Deanery, in his time, were frequent; and many of the Performers were the principal Gentlemen in Canterbury and the neighbourhood.' His influence in the constituency of Canterbury was reasonably strong although not always sufficient for successfully electing an MP.

== Works ==
The English Short Title Catalogue (ESTC) lists two publications: A sermon preached before the Honourable House of Commons, at St. Margaret’s Westminster, on Thursday, January 30, 1755. Being appointed to be observed as the Day of the Martyrdom of King Charles I. By William Freind, D. D. Prebendary of Westminster, and Chaplain in Ordinary to His Majesty (London, 1755); and Concio ad clerum in synodo provinciali Cantuariensis Provinciæ, habita ad D. Pauli die 6to Novembris, A.D. MDCCLXI. A Gulielmo Freind, ..., (Londini, 1761).

Church of England titles
Preceded by John Lynch	Dean of Canterbury; 1760-1766	Succeeded by John Potter
