= Bridge, Kent =

Village in Kent, England

Coordinates: 51.2450°N 1.1274°E

Bridge
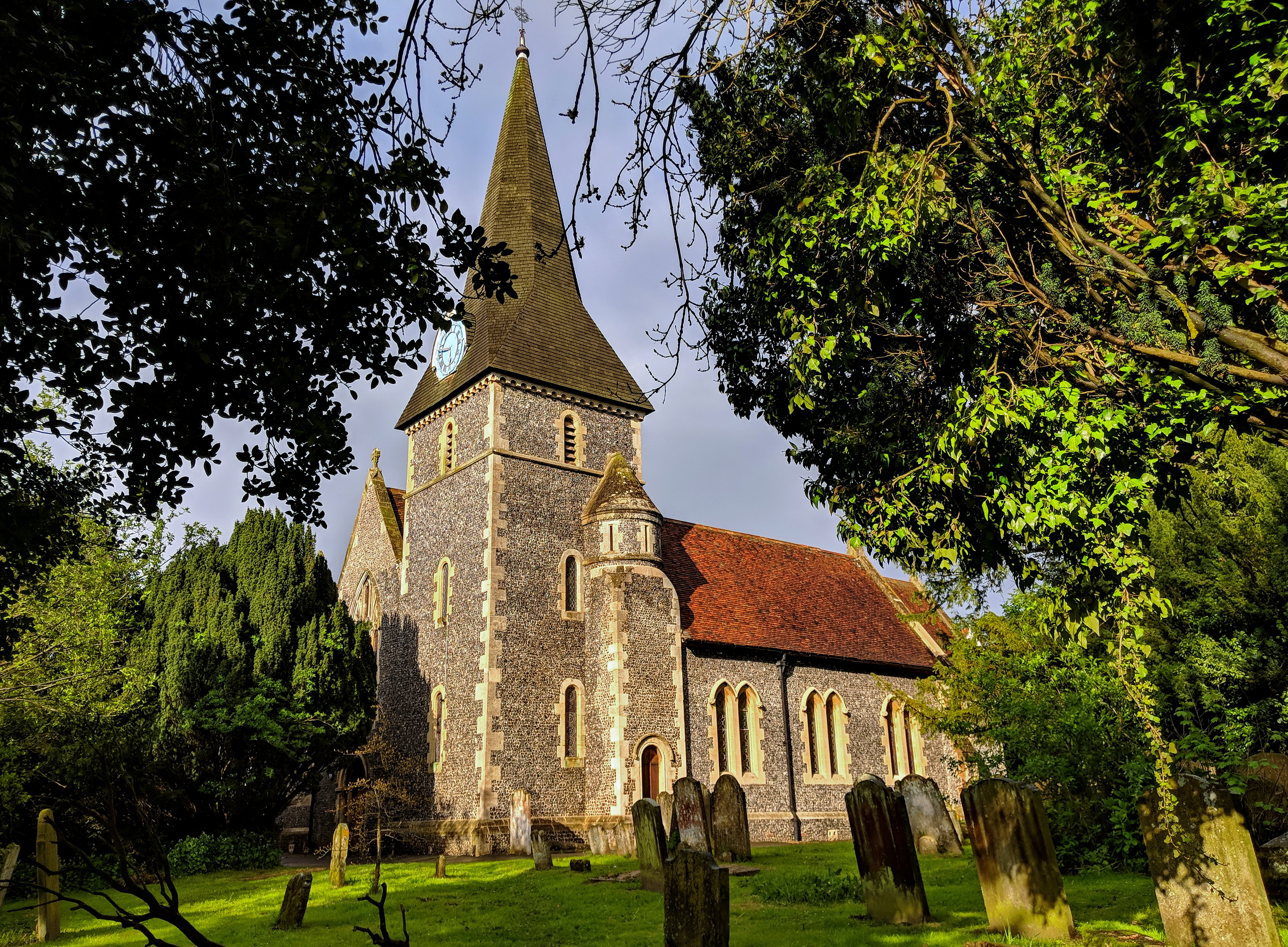
- St Peter's Church, Bridge

- Location within Kent
- Area: 4.08 km^{2} (1.58 sq mi)
- Population: 1,576 (Civil Parish 2011)
  - Density: 386/km^{2} (1,000/sq mi)
- OS grid reference: TR182542
- Civil parish: Bridge
- District: Canterbury
- Shire county: Kent
- Region: South East
- Country: England
- Sovereign state: United Kingdom
- Post town: CANTERBURY
- Postcode district: CT4
- Dialling code: 01227
- Police: Kent
- Fire: Kent
- Ambulance: South East Coast
- UK Parliament: Canterbury

Bridge is a village and civil parish near Canterbury in Kent, South East England.

Bridge village is in the Nailbourne valley in a rural setting on the old Roman road, Watling Street, formerly the main road between London and Dover. The village itself is centred 2.5 miles (4.0 km) south-east of the city of Canterbury.

== History ==
It is likely that the parish took its name from "Bregge", a bridge which crossed the river Nailbourne, a tributary of the Stour. The parish church is dedicated to Saint Peter.

== Geography ==
The village is surrounded by a buffer zone, and is almost entirely residential and agricultural. Its layout is a cross between a linear settlement and a clustered settlement.

== Amenities ==
Bourne Park House is a Queen Anne mansion with lake, occasionally open to the public. Its façade and structure date mostly to 1702.

== In popular culture ==
Fyfe Robertson presented ' Robbie: The Car ' on BBC One, Thursday 24 July 1975, in which was shown Bridge's traffic congested roads.

== See also ==
- Listed buildings in Bridge, Kent
