= Reinbold =

Reinbold is a surname. Notable people with the surname include:

- Georg Reinbold von Aroldingen und Eltzingen, German military officer
- Karin Reinbold von Aroldingen, German-American ballerina
- Jennifer Mundel-Reinbold
- Leo M. Reinbold (1933–2010), American politician
- Lora Reinbold (born 1964), American politician

== See also ==
- Reinebold
- Reinhold
- Reibold
- Rimbaud (surname)
- Raimbaud
- Raimbaut
- Regenbald
- Reginbald (disambiguation)
- Dreyer & Reinbold Racing
