= Rimbaud (surname) =

Rimbaud is a surname. Notable people with the surname include:

- Arthur Rimbaud (1854–1891), French poet
- Penny Rimbaud (born 1943), British writer, poet, philosopher, painter, musician, and activist
- Robin Rimbaud or Scanner (born 1964), British electronic musician

== See also ==
- Raimbaud
- Raimbaut
- Reinebold
- Reinbold
- Regenbald
- Reginbald (disambiguation)
