= Raimbaut =

Given name

Raimbaut is a given name. Notable people with the name include:

- Raimbaut, Count of Orange (died 1121), elder son of Bertrand Raimbaut and of his first wife Gilberte
- Raimbaut of Orange (1147–1173), or in Occitan Raimbaut d'Aurenga, was the lord of Orange and Aumelas and a troubadour
- Raimbaut de Vaqueiras (1180–1207), Provençal troubadour and, later in his life, knight

== See also ==
- Raimbaud
- Rimbaud (surname)
- Reinebold
- Reinbold
- Regenbald
- Reginbald (disambiguation)
