= Sopwith =

Sopwith may refer to:

- Douglas George Sopwith (1906–1970), Scottish engineer
- Karl Sopwith (1873–1945), English clergyman
- Sopwith Aviation Company, defunct British aircraft manufacturer
- Sopwith (video game), 1984 video game
- Sopwith (board game)
- Thomas Sopwith (disambiguation), several people

== See also ==
- Sopworth, a village in Wiltshire, England, has sometimes been spelled "Sopwith"
