= James Crofts =

James Crofts may refer to:

- James Scott, 1st Duke of Monmouth (1649–1685), English nobleman, originally called James Crofts
- James Crofts (British Army officer)

== See also ==
- James Croft (disambiguation)
