= James Croft (disambiguation) =

James Croft (c. 1518–1590) was an English politician.

James Croft may also refer to:

- James E. Croft (1833–1914), Union Army soldier and Medal of Honor recipient
- James Croft (priest) (1784–1869), Archdeacon of Canterbury
- James Croft (died 1624), Member of Parliament for Brackley
- Sir James Herbert Croft, 11th Baronet (1907–1941), British army officer

== See also ==
- Jamie Croft, Australian actor
- James Scott, 1st Duke of Monmouth (1649–1685), English nobleman, originally called James Crofts
- James Crofts (British Army officer)
- Croft (surname)
