= Derek Watson =

Derek Watson may refer to:

- Derek Watson (priest) (born 1938), Dean of Salisbury, 1996–2002
- Derek Watson (gridiron football) (born 1981), Canadian football running back
- Derek Watson (actor and musicologist) (1948–2018)
