= Cirencester Abbey =

Augustinian abbey in Gloucestershire, England

- Augustinian abbey of St Mary the Virgin, Cirencester
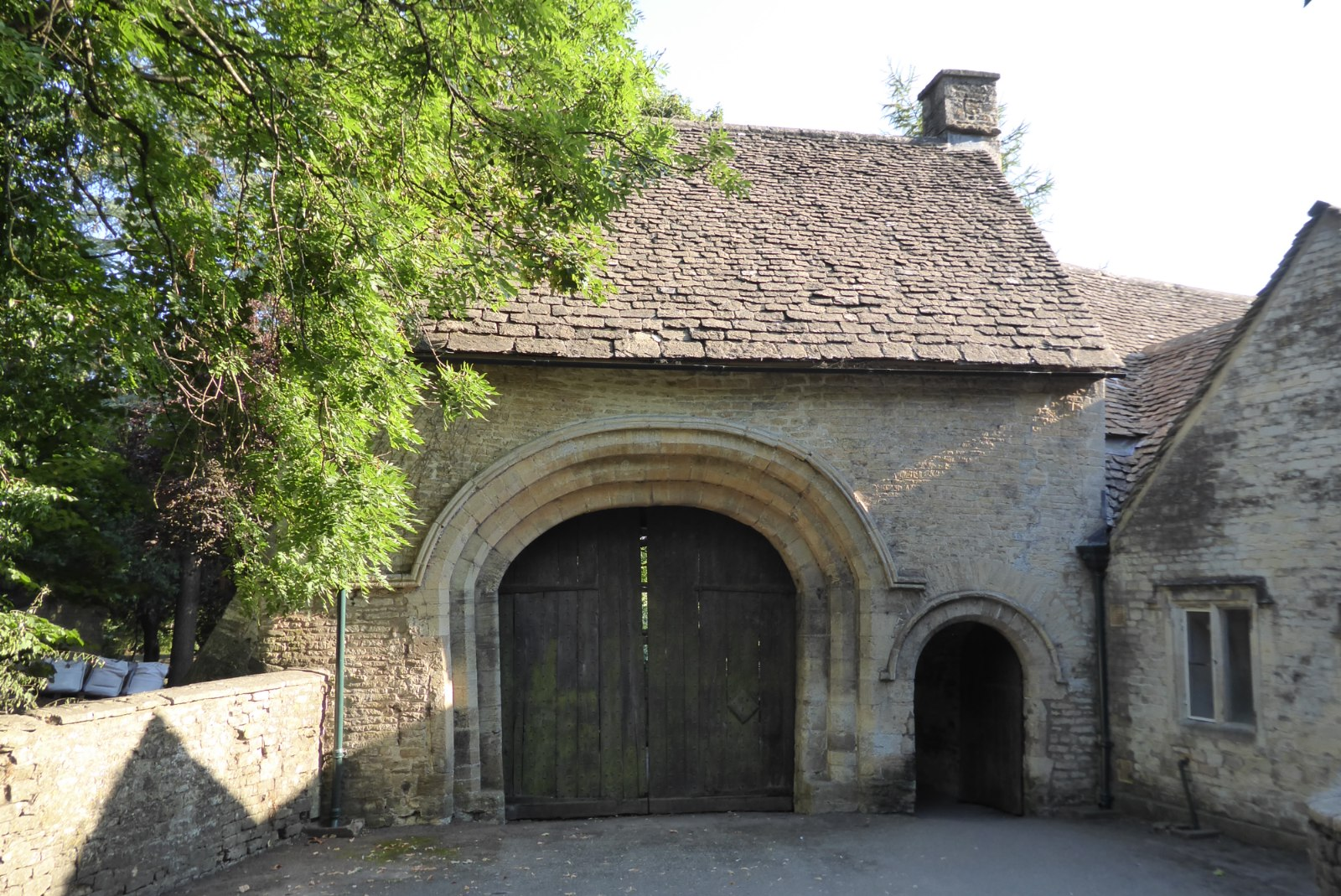
- Cirencester Abbey gatehouse
- Cirencester Abbey
- 51.7191°N 1.9660°W
- Country: England

History
- Founded: 1130
- Founder: Henry I of England
- Dedication: Mary the Virgin
- Dedicated: 17 October 1176

Architecture
- Style: Romanesque, Gothic
- Closed: 19 December 1539

Cirencester Abbey was a house of regular canons in Cirencester, Gloucestershire, founded in 1130 by Henry I of England on the site of a large late-Saxon church. It grew into one of the wealthiest communities of Augustinians in England, noted for its library and a substantial precinct shaped by mills and managed watercourses. The abbey was surrendered in December 1539 during the dissolution of the monasteries.

== Site and pre-Conquest church ==
Excavations in 1964–6 revealed that the abbey was built partly over the nave of its predecessor, a long late-Saxon basilica. The 'very old chapel' south of the choir mentioned by William Worcester was not the pre-Conquest church, as nineteenth-century writers had supposed. The foundations suggest a tenth-century date within a royal-town church building movement; the plan shows a narrow nave with elongated porticus and possible western porch or tower.

== The collegiate church and Henry I's refoundation ==
A secular college serving a large minster parish existed by 1086; its endowment was later swollen by estates of the royal clerk Regenbald. Medieval and later assertions that Regenbald was 'dean' or that a full prebendal structure existed before the abbey are the fruit of later misunderstanding and documentary tampering.

Evans's diplomatic analysis shows that the 'Henry I' charter was interpolated in the later twelfth century to strengthen Cirencester's title to properties, and that references to prebends are absent from the earliest confirmations.

According to Florence of Worcester, Henry I began a 'new work' at Cirencester in 1117, which has often been assumed to mark the beginning of the abbey's construction, but it is impossible to link this statement definitively to the abbey.

== Foundation and early development (1130–1215) ==
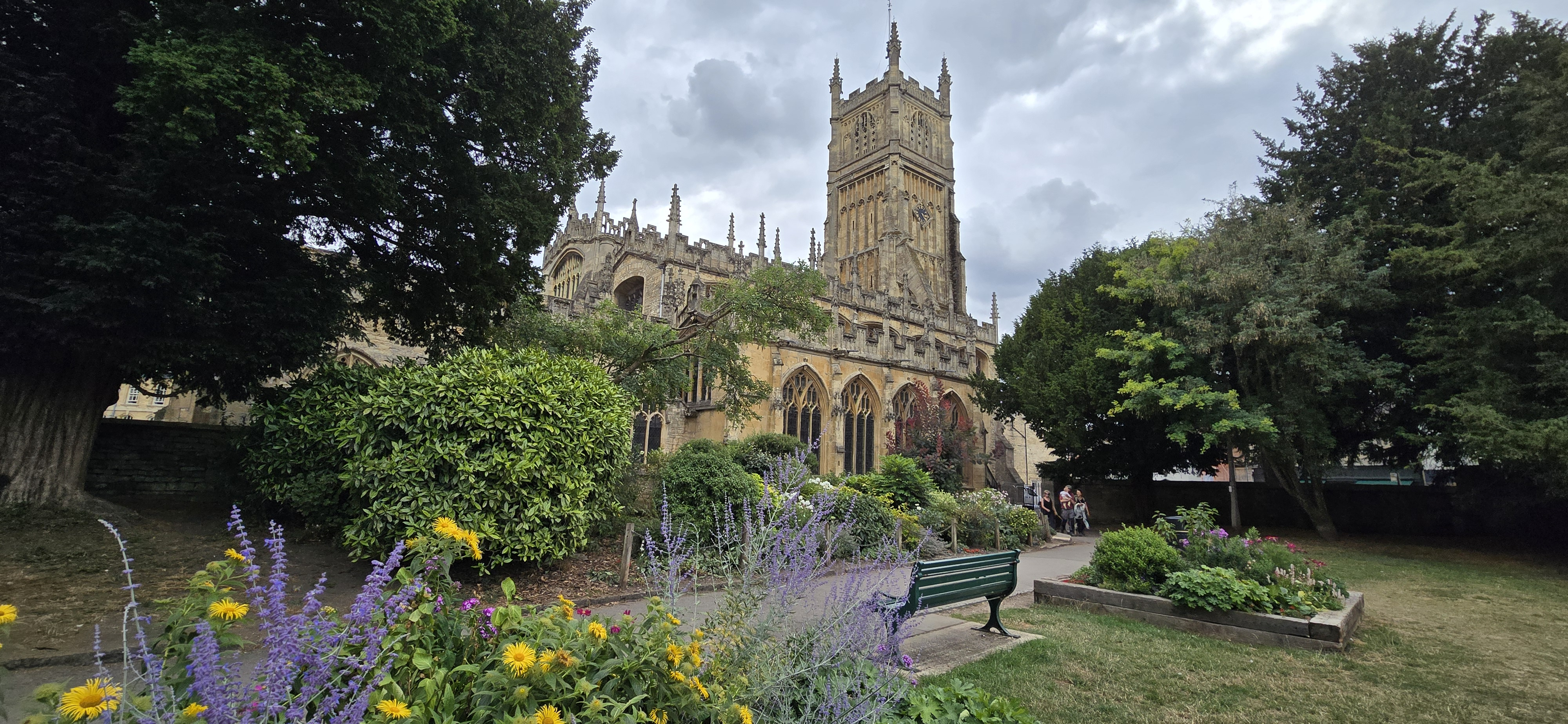
Abbey gardens with the church of St John the Baptist.

Henry I transformed the church into an Augustinian abbey. Administrative records show that Serlo became the first abbot in 1130, a canon of Salisbury Cathedral who had probably served before as dean of Salisbury. The first regular canons came from Merton Priory. The new foundation absorbed the older church's revenues and undertook a major building campaign for church and claustral ranges. The abbey church was dedicated on 17 October 1176 by Bartholomew of Exeter.

The former minster church brought existing connections and obligations. As the new church rose, the canons relocated parish worship to the church of St John the Baptist, Cirencester and managed the dependent Hospital of St John, first recorded in the late twelfth and early thirteenth centuries and long treated as dependent on the parish church before acquiring a more distinct status.

Under Abbot Adam (from 1177) the house secured papal confirmations of its 'good customs' and strengthened its estate management after the brief, troubled abbacy of Robert (1183–6). Abbot Richard (1187–1213) regained royal favour, obtained important fiscal concessions, and advanced appropriations to sustain the community.

== Buildings, precinct, and water ==
Cirencester's cloister lay on the north of the church: an unusual English arrangement that reflected the need to retain continuity with the pre-Conquest precinct. Between the 1220s and 1240s, the canons built a conduit to bring spring water to the lavatorium and refectory; by mid-century there is clear evidence for piped water serving claustral and domestic ranges, and for management of watercourses at Spital Gate and within the precinct.

The precinct was large, bounded by the River Churn and crossed by the Gunstool Brook; gates included the surviving Spital Gate (also known as the Almery or Abbey Gateway).

== Learning and library ==
From the first, Cirencester drew scholars. Robert of Cricklade, an early canon, wrote a work titled The Marriage of the Prophet Jacob there in the 1130s and added works to the abbey's library by William of Malmesbury. Alexander Neckam, already celebrated as a teacher, entered the community and as abbot (1213–17) helped restore its standing. Alexander's nephew, Geoffrey Brito, a canon of Cirencester, acted as editor and compiler of a major miscellany of Alexander’s works (beginning with the words Sol meldunensis), organizing pittances with the 'friends of Master Alexander'.

References to a magister scolarum appear by 1242, but a school likely existed earlier.

Remodelling of the east claustral range in the fourteenth century created book rooms flanking a new polygonal chapter house, work plausibly tied to Abbot William Hereward (1335–52), who also addressed major structural repairs to the church.

== Economy and lordship ==
Henry I's grant included nineteen churches across several counties, forming the core of a large spiritual income; by the 1254 Norwich valuation, these sources yielded around £350 (equivalent to £557,387 in 2025). The abbey's wealth rested on broad estates and lordship over the town, with water power at their heart. The canons controlled a chain of mills; disputes with tenants over hand mills led in 1301 to the breaking of illicit quern-stones by the abbot's officers.

== Later Middle Ages ==
Political upheavals in the early fourteenth century strained finances and discipline; episcopal visitation records and royal entries attest to disorder before Hereward's programme of repair and building. Thereafter, work continued on the eastern arm and chapels.

== Dissolution ==
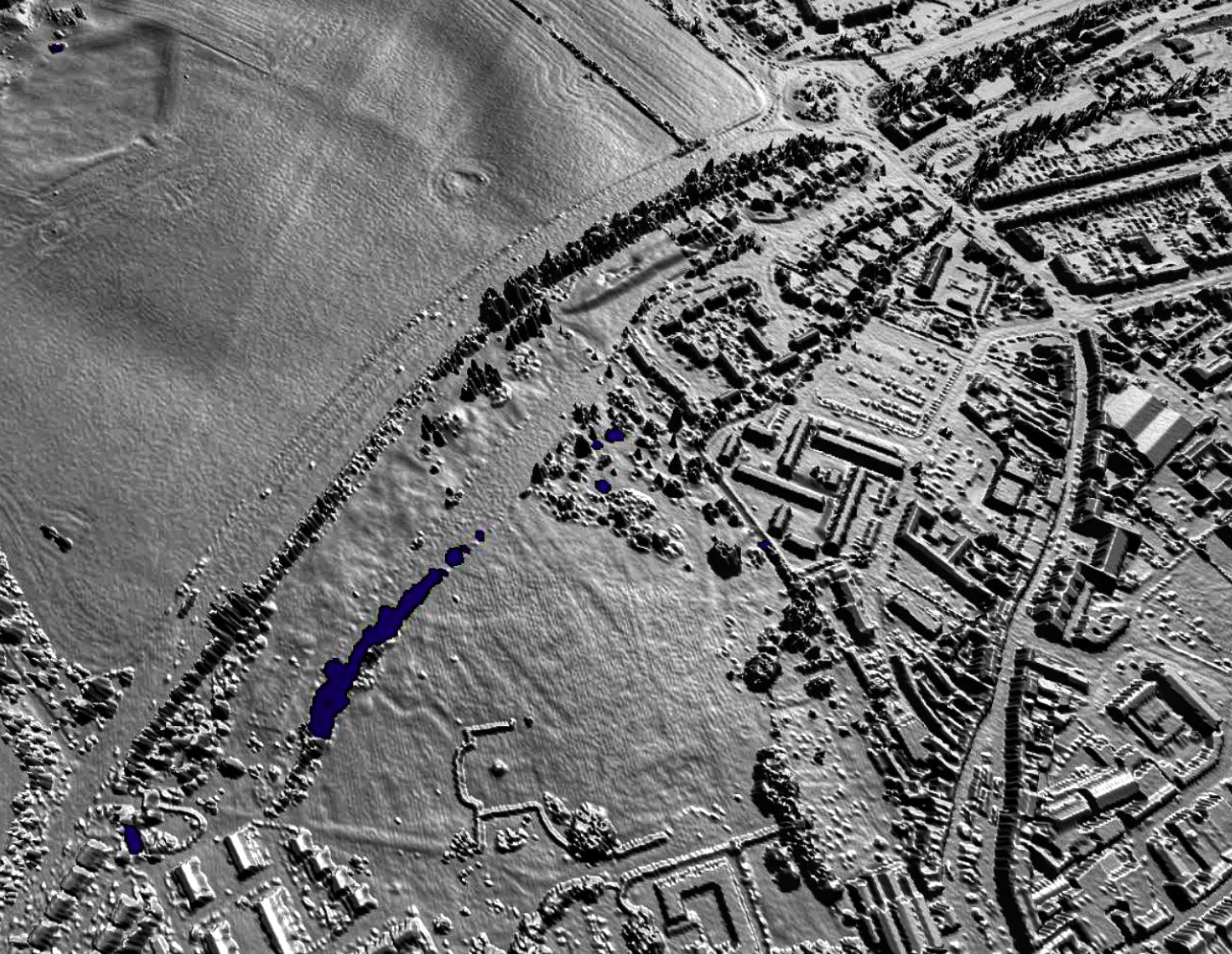
A lidar view of the site of Cirencester Abbey and the town wall.

Community numbers fell from a high of perhaps forty canons in the earlier Middle Ages to about seventeen by the 1530s. Abbot John Blake surrendered the abbey on 19 December 1539 and received a pension; the rich moveable goods and the precinct passed into lay hands.

== Architectural remains ==
The medieval parish arrangements left two round-headed arches built into the later parish church of St John as relics of the twelfth-century fabric. Within the abbey bounds, later excavations traced the church plan, eastern extensions, and the lines of the water system; Spital Gate still stands.

== Abbots ==
- Serlo, 1130–
- Andrew, –1176
- Adam, 1177–1183
- Robert, 1183–1186
- Richard, 1187–1213
- Alexander Neckam (Nequam), 1213–1217
- Walter of Gloucester, 1217–1230
- Hugh of Bampton (Bampt', Bamptone, Bamton), 1230–?1250
- Roger of Rodmarton (Rodmerton), 1250–?1267
- Henry de Mundene, 1267–1281
- Henry of Hampnett (Hampton, Hamptonet, Hamtonet), 1281–1307
- Adam of Brokenborough (Brokenbarewe, Brokenberwe, Brokeneberg, Brokeneborwe), 1307–1320
- Richard of Charlton, 1320–1335
- William Hereward, 1335–1352
- Ralph of ?Eastcott (Escote, Estcote), 1352–1358
- William of Martley (Marteleye), 1358–1361
- William of Lyneham (Lynham, also Lynton), 1361–1363
- Nicholas (de) Ampney (Ameneye, Aumeneye), 1363–1393
- John Lekhampton (Lechampton), 1393–1416
- William Best (Beste), 1416–1430
- William Wotton, 1430–1440
- John Taunton (Tawnton, Tawton), 1440–1455
- William George alias Jorge (Jeorge), 1455–1464
- John Sobbury (Sobbery), 1464–1478
- Thomas Compton, 1478–1481
- Richard Clyve (Clyffe), 1481–1488
- Thomas Aston, 1488–1504
- John Hagbourne (Hacbourne, Hackbone, Hagborne, Hagburne, Hageborn, Hakborne, Hakbourn), 1504–1522
- John Blake, 1522–1539
