= Sheila Watson (priest) =

British priest in the Church of England

The Reverend Sheila Watson
- Archdeacon of Canterbury
- Church: Church of England
- Diocese: Diocese of Canterbury
- In office: 2007 to 2016
- Predecessor: Patrick Evans
- Successor: Jo Kelly-Moore
- Other post: Archdeacon of Buckingham (2002–2007)

Orders
- Ordination: 1987 (deacon); 1994 (priest)

Personal details
- Born: Sheila Anne Atkinson; 20 May 1953 (age 73)
- Denomination: Anglicanism
- Spouse: Derek Watson
- Education: Ayr Academy
- Alma mater: University of St Andrews; University of Oxford

Sheila Anne Watson (née Atkinson; born 20 May 1953) is a British priest in the Church of England. From 2007 until 2016, she was Archdeacon of Canterbury; she was Archdeacon of Buckingham between 2002 and 2007.

== Early life and education ==
Watson was born on 20 May 1953. She grew up in a seaside town. She was educated at Ayr Academy, a comprehensive school in Ayr, South Ayrshire, Scotland. She graduated in classics at the University of St Andrews. She then did a preparatory year of theology at the University of Oxford and then returned to St Andrews for a research degree.

== Religious life ==
She became a deaconess in 1979, serving in two Scottish parishes (1979–80), North East England (1980–84), London (1984-1996 - where she also gained experience in the diocesan selection and training of clergy and laity at the advisory board of Ministry in Westminster) and Salisbury (1997-2002 where her husband Derek Watson was Dean of Salisbury until his retirement in 2002). She was ordained as a deacon in 1987 and as a priest in 1994. From 2002 to 2007 she was the Archdeacon of Buckingham in the Diocese of Oxford.

Succeeding Patrick Evans on his retirement, Watson was announced in January 2007 to be the next Archdeacon of Canterbury, the first woman in the position and only the second woman to be a residential canon at Canterbury Cathedral. She was installed during Choral Evensong at the cathedral on 28 April 2007. On 21 March 2013, she enthroned Justin Welby as the 105th Archbishop of Canterbury. She was the first woman to carry out that ceremony. She resigned as Archdeacon of Canterbury on 6 January 2016.

== Personal life ==
Watson is married to Derek Watson. Her husband is also a Church of England priest and was previously Dean of Salisbury. She is now the Preacher of Lincoln's Inn.

== Honours ==
Watson was awarded an honorary Doctor of Divinity (DD) degree by the University of Kent in November 2013.

Religious titles
Preceded by David Goldie	Archdeacon of Buckingham; 2002–2007	Succeeded by Karen Gorham
Preceded by Patrick Evans	Archdeacon of Canterbury; 2007–2016	Jo Kelly-Moore
