= Patrick Evans (priest) =

Patrick Alexander Sidney Evans is a Church of England clergyman, born in 1943. As a child, he attended Stubbington House School between 1950 and 1956, before attending Clifton College between 1956 and 1961. He trained originally to become a solicitor and then worked in marketing and sales management, before training for ordination at Lincoln Theological College and becoming Vicar of St Mildred's, Tenterden and Area Dean of West Charing.

He then became Archdeacon of Maidstone and Diocesan Director of Ordinands, posts he held until 2002, and then from 2002 to his retirement in March 2007 he was Archdeacon of Canterbury in the Church of England. From 1989 to 2007 he was also an Honorary Canon of Canterbury Cathedral.

He is co-chairman of Canterbury and Rochester Church in Society and has also served as a trustee and board member of numerous Church associations and several secular charities.

Church of England titles
Preceded by Michael Percival Smith	Archdeacon of Maidstone; 1989–2002	Succeeded by Philip Down
Preceded by John Pritchard	Archdeacon of Canterbury; 2002–2007	Succeeded by Sheila Watson
