= John Ferdinand Smyth Stuart =

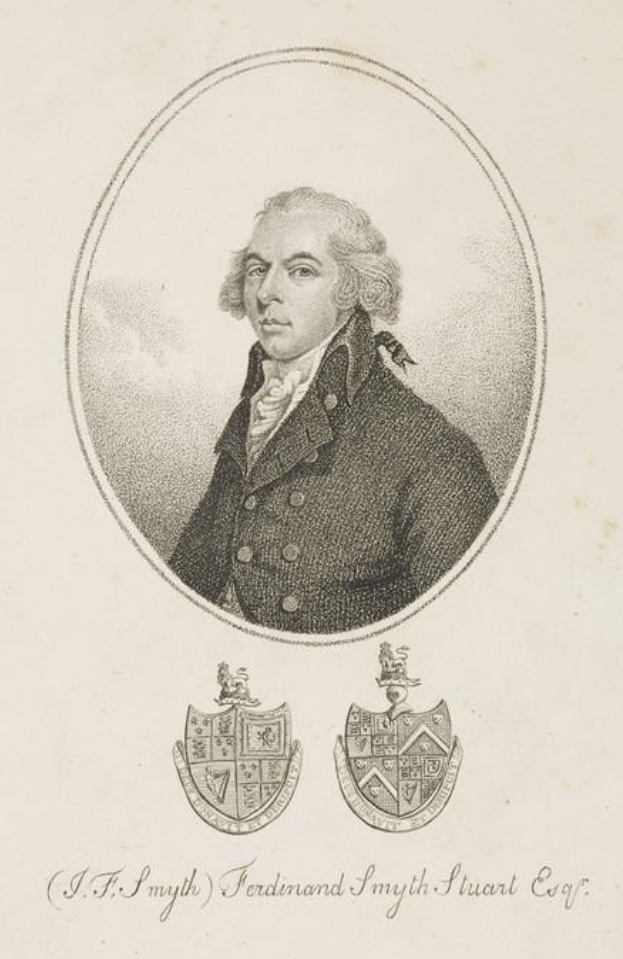
Ferdinand Smyth Stuart, 1808

John Ferdinand Smyth Stuart (1745 – 20 December 1814), known until 1793 as John Ferdinand Smyth and mostly after that as Ferdinand Smyth Stuart, was a Scottish-born American loyalist and physician who claimed to be a great-grandson of King Charles II. As the author of A Tour in the United States of America (1784), he used the name John Ferdinand Dalziel Smyth.

Leaving America during the Revolutionary War, Stuart spent the rest of his life in England and the West Indies.

== Background and early life ==
Stuart was born in Scotland in 1745 and began life there as John Smyth or John Ferdinand Smyth. He later wrote that he was the son of R. Wentworth Smyth, a gentleman who had fought in the Jacobite rising of 1715 and also the later one of 1745. According to Stuart's account, in 1744 his elderly father married Maria Julia Dalziel, a widow of fifteen, as his second wife. He reported that his mother was a granddaughter of General James Crofts, a natural son of the Duke of Monmouth, who was a son of Charles II, and that Wentworth Smyth was Monmouth's son by Henrietta Maria Wentworth, a daughter of Thomas, Lord Wentworth, and granddaughter of Thomas Wentworth, 1st Earl of Cleveland. Henrietta Maria had died in 1686, not long after Monmouth's execution, and Stuart said a Colonel Smyth, an aide-de-camp of Monmouth's, had adopted her son and made him his own heir. Consequently, Stuart's father had grown up in France, from where he returned to Scotland at the time of the 1715 Rising. Stuart stated in 1808 that he had been named for his godfather, Prince Ferdinand of Brunswick.

The historian Allan Fea states in his biography of Monmouth that Major-General James Crofts married a daughter of Sir Thomas Taylor (“after 1706, when he is described as single”) and had a daughter, Maria Julia; and that she married first a Mr Dalziel and secondly R. Wentworth Smyth-Stuart, who claimed to be Monmouth's son by Henrietta Maria Wentworth. Fea was convinced that Monmouth ”undoubtedly left a son by her (born in 1681), who was adopted and educated in Paris by Colonel Smyth”. A genealogist, Anthony J. Camp, has cast doubts on this account.

Stuart recalled being orphaned by the death of his mother when he was two and his father when he was five, his father being drowned in a river, after falling off a bridge during an attempt to arrest him. According to Stuart, he was “bred to Physic and was at one of the Scotch Universities” and migrated to Virginia in the year 1763. An obituary said that Stuart had been a Doctor of Medicine and had been educated “amid the Grampian hills”, and then had “attended the lectures of Dr Gregory” at Aberdeen, but no university career has been traced.

== Life in America ==
Stuart emigrated to the Thirteen Colonies and settled near Williamsburg in the Colony of Virginia, where he later practised as a physician. By the 1770s, he had become a planter, renting plantations rather than owning them. The American Revolutionary War broke out, and on 15 October 1775, Smyth joined the Loyalist forces. He later wrote that at one time he commanded an armed sloop in Chesapeake Bay and at another raised a company of men for frontier work. More than once he was taken prisoner, and was shackled for eighteen months.

Escaping from rebel forces, Stuart arrived in New York in 1777, and was commissioned as a Captain into the Queen's Rangers, a Loyalist regiment. In October 1777, he fought at the Battle of Germantown. Back in New York, at about the end of 1777, Stuart wrote his Narrative or Journal of Capt. John Ferdinand Dalziel Smyth, of the Queen's Rangers, setting out his adventures, and was critical of the “deluded and mistaken” rebels. This was printed in 1778. The Queen's Rangers were stationed at King's Bridge, New York, from July 1778, and on 23 October 1778, Stuart married Abigail Haugewout, the daughter of a loyalist farmer in Hempstead, Long Island. Their daughter Elizabeth was born in 1780.

Stuart had leave to be absent from two musters in 1778, one in August and another in October, but he was on duty in February 1779. In May 1779, he launched a number of proceedings against his commanding officer, Lieutenant-Colonel John Graves Simcoe, but they were found to be “Malicious, Frivolous, Vexatious, & Groundless”. Simcoe claimed that Captain Smyth “avoided military service whenever possible”. At a muster in June 1779, he had sick leave, and not far into 1780, he returned to England, on the grounds of ill health.

== England and West Indies ==
Stuart remained an officer on half-pay for the duration of the American War. The British government had set up a Commission to give financial help to loyalists with losses from the war, and in 1780 they awarded Stuart £100 a year as an interim allowance, increasing this to £200 in 1781 and to £300 in 1783. He made an application to the Privy Council, asking to be awarded Long Island, a Crown property in the Bahamas, in view of his claimed losses of 3,300 acres in Virginia and Maryland, but he was not believed and this was rejected. His half-pay came to an end in 1783.

In 1784, allegations were made against Stuart to the claims commissioners, and his allowance was suspended. Stuart then wrote his book A Tour in the United States of America, which was published by George Robinson in 1784, agreeing to pay £160 for the printing. This, however, brought his account of himself to a wide public, and people who had known him in North America challenged it.

In 1785, Stuart went out to Jamaica, where he was appointed a Major “in that Island only”, but only remained there for sixteen days, as the result of a hurricane.

In 1793, Captain Smyth adopted the name of Stuart, to mark his claim to descent from the House of Stuart. He later explained this in letters to the Earl of Moira, commenting "for, indeed, what was the name of Smyth to me?"

In 1795, Stuart accepted a post as assistant barrack-master-general in San Domingo and to get there joined Admiral Sir Hugh Cloberry Christian on an expedition to the West Indies. He was shipwrecked three times in 1795 and 1796 and was present at the British capture of Saint Lucia and Martinique. In San Domingo, although not employed as a medical officer, he prescribed five grains of tartarised antimony and a tablespoonful of soft sugar for the treatment of yellow fever, later claiming that this had proved a good treatment. On his return to England, Stuart continued to pursue his financial claims unsuccessfully, but writing many times in support of them.

In 1803, while Stuart was barrack-master at Billericay, he suffered a severe beating which knocked out several of his teeth. In the final years of his life, he was barrack-master at Landguard Fort, near Felixstowe in Suffolk.

In a book of 1808, shortly after the death of Cardinal Stuart, Stuart described himself as the nearest descendant of the House of Stuart. In 1814, he retired from his work as a barrack-master and settled in Vernon Place, Bloomsbury Square.

== Marriages and children ==
On 23 October 1778, while he was Captain Smyth of the Queen's Rangers, against her father's wishes Stuart married Abigail Haugewout, the 23-year-old daughter of Leffert Haugewout, a loyalist farmer of Hempstead, New York. They set up house in Oyster Bay and had one daughter, Elizabeth, born in October 1780, but by then Smyth had gone to live in England. His pregnant wife did not go with him and lived on until 1828, on a farm of fifteen acres in Hempstead which her father gave her. In 1797, Stuart returned on a visit and met his wife in New York. In 1802, his daughter Elizabeth married Gideon Nichols, a Hempstead merchant.

Before his return to New York in 1797, Stuart had begun a second family in England with Eunice Gray, a girl of about sixteen. Their son Henry was born in 1793, their first daughter, Henrietta Maria, in 1797, and another daughter, Mary Clementina, about 1799, then another son, Charles Henry, in 1802. On 7 September 1803, Stuart married Eunice Gray, at St Martin-in-the-Fields, Westminster. Their third son, Constantine Wentworth, was born in August 1805, a fourth, Spencer Percival, in 1807, and a fifth and last son, Ferdinand, in 1812. As a result of Stuart's visit to New York in 1797, his daughter Elizabeth at Hempstead was in contact with her new relations in England. Four of the children in England died young: Henry in 1794, Charles Henry in 1802, Spencer Percival about 1807, and Henrietta Maria in 1813, just after her 16th birthday.

== Death and posterity ==
On 20 December 1814, Stuart died as a result of being run over by a carriage which hit him at the corner of Southampton Street, Westminster, leaving his second family destitute. He was buried on 1 January 1815 at Marylebone, where the parish register notes that he was of St George's parish, Bloomsbury. The Monthly Magazine printed a six-page obituary which celebrated Stuart's life, believing his version of all events, and appealed on behalf of his dependants:

It may be hoped that some friend of the royal house of Guelph will do Humanity the justice to point out to them the necessities of this withered branch of the once-royal house of Stuart.

In January 1815, Lord Palmerston, Secretary for War, agreed to Eunice Stuart being paid an annual allowance of £25 out of his Compassionate Fund, including £15 for the support of her children. In June 1816, the Prince Regent, the future George IV, granted Eunice a pension of £50 a year from the Civil List, to supplement the grant from the Compassionate Fund, which she reported to Palmerston. She died in 1818, and Palmerston increased the money paid for the children to £24 a year. A neighbour paid for Constantine Wentworth's education at Charterhouse School, Smithfield, and had some correspondence with Sir Walter Scott, telling him the Prince had asked the College of Arms to look into the children's origins and that the £50 pension had been recommended by Sir Isaac Heard. Scott himself sent £5 for the children.

Two of Stuart's remaining children died in their twenties, Mary Clementina in 1826, and Ferdinand in 1835. Constantine Wentworth lived until 1849, and married. In July 1828, he was an officer in the 6th Regiment of Foot and was promoted from Ensign to Lieutenant without purchase. He resigned his commission at Poona, in 1832, and later visited his half-sister, Elizabeth, in Hempstead, New York. She had a number of children and grandchildren, lived until 1858, and left many descendants.

== Published works ==
- John Ferdinand Dalziel Smyth, Narrative or Journal of Capt. John Ferdinand Dalziel Smyth, of the Queen's Rangers (New York, 1778), is Stuart's first known substantial publication.
- John Ferdinand Dalziel Smyth, A Tour in the United States of America (London, G. Robinson, 1784), a much longer work, describes Stuart's recent travels there and his activities during the War of Independence. The book was republished in 2010 in a 468-page paperback by Kessinger Publishing of Whitefish, Montana, ISBN 978-1162797267. It was translated into French and in 1791 published by Buisson of Paris under the title Voyage dans les États-Unis de l'Amérique, fait en 1784. Stuart's view of the country has been called

“...vigorous but not flattering. The republican opinions of the colonists were obnoxious to a loyalist, while their barbarous manners were repellent to a gentleman.”

- John Ferdinand Smyth Stuart, A Letter to Lord Henry Petty on Coercive Vaccination (London, 1807) is a forceful medical and political argument against vaccination addressed to Lord Henry Petty, the youthful Chancellor of the Exchequer. It was motivated by the death of one of his own children.
- Ferdinand Smyth Stuart, The Case of Ferdinand Smyth Stuart (London, 1807) returned to Stuart's complaints about his treatment by the British government.
- Ferdinand Smyth Stuart, Destiny and Fortitude: An Historical Poem: In Sixteen Elegies: Being a Detail of the Misfortunes of the Illustrious House of Stuart, by Ferdinand Smyth Stuart, the nearest descendant (London: Printed for the Author, by Cox, Son, and Baylis, 1808): this followed shortly after the death of Henry Benedict Stuart, the last legitimate Stuart descendant of King James II, and explained his own connection to the royal house.
