= Archdeacon of Canterbury =

Senior office-holder in Diocese of Canterbury at Church of England

The Archdeacon of Canterbury is a senior office-holder in the Diocese of Canterbury (a division of the Church of England Province of Canterbury). Like other archdeacons, they are an administrator in the diocese at large (having oversight of parishes in roughly one-third of the diocese) and is a canon residentiary of the cathedral.

== History ==
The Archdeacon of Canterbury has an additional role, traditionally serving as the Archbishop of Canterbury's representative at enthronement ceremonies for new diocesan bishops in her province. At these services, the archdeacon reads the archbishop's mandate and, taking the new bishops by the hand, conducts them to their episcopal throne.

The archdeaconry and archdeacon of Canterbury have been in constant existence since the 11th century. There was one short-lived attempt to split the role in the 12th century. In modern times, the archdeaconry has been split twice: creating Maidstone archdeaconry in 1841 and Ashford archdeaconry in 2011.

== Composition ==
The archdeaconry covers approximately the north-east corner of the diocese. As of 2012, the archdeaconry of Canterbury consists the following deaneries in the Diocese of Canterbury:

- Deanery of Canterbury
- Deanery of East Bridge
- Deanery of Reculver
- Deanery of Thanet
- Deanery of Stour Valley

== List of archdeacons ==
=== Pre-Norman Conquest ===
- 798: Wulfred
- 844: Beornoth
- 853: Athelweald
- 864: Ealstan
- 866: Sigifrith
- 866: Liaving
- 890: Werbeald
- bef. 1054: Brinstan
- 1054: Haimo

=== High Medieval ===
- bef. c. 1080–aft. c. 1080: Valerius
- bef. 1075–aft. 1086: Ansketil
- bef. 1099–aft. 1108: William
- 1115–May 1125 (res.): John
- bef. 1126–1138: Helewise
- bef. c. 1139–March 1148 (res.): Walter
- aft. 1148–October 1154 (res.): Roger de Pont L'Évêque
- aft. 1154–1163 (res.): Thomas Becket (also Archbishop of Canterbury from 1162)
- bef. 1163–October 1174 (res.): Geoffrey Ridel
- 1175–June 1194 (res.): Herbert Poore
- bef. 1194–aft. 1195 (res.): Philip of Poitou
- bef. 1196–aft. 1206: Henry de Castilion
- bef. 1213–May 1227 (res.): Henry Sandford
- 14 May 1227 – 1248 (d.): Simon Langton
- 28 January 1232–?: Richard de Sancto Johanne (ineffective royal appointment)
- bef. 1248–July 1269 (d.): Stephen de Monte Luelli (aka of Vienne)
- aft. July 1269–9 October 1275 (d.): Hugh de Mortuo Mari
- October 1275–May 1278 (res.): William Middleton
- 1278–bef. 1280 (d.): Robert of Gernemue
- aft. 1280–1299 (res.): Richard de Ferings
- 29 June 1299–September 1305 (res.): John de Langeton

=== Late Medieval ===
- 22 September 1305–bef. 1306 (res.): Simon de Faversham
- 13 February 1306 – 22 November 1310 (res.): Bernard Ezius de le Breto
- 3 December 1310–bef. 1319 (res.): Guichard de le Breto
- 1 May 1319–bef. 1323 (d.): Simon of Comminges (Simon Convenis), son of Bernard VII, Count of Comminges and brother of Bernard VIII, Count of Comminges
- 18 April 1323 – 1323 (dep.): John Bruton
- 23 April 1323–November 1325 (d.): Raymond de Roux
- 13 March 1326 – 1332 (res.): Hugh de Angoulême
- 15 July 1332 – 1333 (res.): Simon de Montacute
- 1334–1337 (res.): Robert de Stratford
- bef. 1338–bef. 1343 (d.): Bernard Sistre
- 25 June 1343–bef. 1370 (res.): Pierre Roger (became Pope Gregory XI)
- 28 June 1343–bef. 1348 (res.): Simon Islip (royal grant; set aside)
- bef. 1372–28 April 1374 (d.): William Cardinal de la Jugee
  (cardinal-priest of St Clement)
- 6 June 1374 – 12 September 1375 (res.): Henry de Wakefield
- aft. 1375–3 June 1379 (deprived): Aymar Roche
- adt. 1379–9 September 1381 (res.): John de Fordham
- 20 September 1381–bef. 1390 (d.): William Pakington
- 28 July 1390 – 23 February 1397 (exch.): Adam Mottrum
- 26 August 1390 – 1390: Thomas Butiller (ineffective royal grant)
- 23 February 1397 – 1400 (res.): Richard Clifford
- 7 April 1400 – 12 May 1406 (res.): Robert Hallam
- 28 October 1406 – 31 May 1408 (d.): Angelo Cardinal Acciaioli, Dean of the
  College of Cardinals & cardinal-bishop of Ostia and Velletri (obedience of Rome)
- 13 July 1408 – 1415 (res.): John Wakering
- 5 June 1416–bef. 1420 (d.): Henry Rumworth (or Circeter)
- 3 October 1420–bef. 1424 (d.): William Chichele
- 10 June 1424–bef. 1434 (res.): Prospero Cardinal Colonna
  (cardinal-deacon of St George in Velabro)
- 14 December 1434 – 26 January 1467 (d.): Thomas Chichele
- bef. 1467–bef. 1479 (d.): Thomas Winterbourne
- February 1479–bef. 1495 (d.): John Bourgchier
- 26 November 1495 – 25 July 1504 (d.): Hugh Peynthwyn
- aft. 1505–bef. 1534 (res.): William Warham
- 9 March 1534 – 15 March 1554 (deprived): Edmund Cranmer

=== Early modern ===
- March 1554–bef. 1559 (deprived): Nicholas Harpsfield
- November 1559–bef. 1571 (res.): Edmund Gheast, Bishop of Rochester
- aft. 1572–aft. 1575 (res.): Edmund Freke, Bishop of Rochester
- 17 May 1576 – 1595 (res.): William Redman
- January 1595–29 March 1619 (d.): Charles Fotherby (also Dean of Canterbury from 1615)
- 10 April 1619 – 29 January 1648 (d.): William Kingsley
- 1648–1660: See suspended during the Commonwealth of England
- August 1660–23 August 1668 (d.): George Hall (also Bishop of Chester from 1662)
- 7 October 1668 – 1670 (res.): William Sancroft
- 18 November 1672 – 20 March 1688 (d.): Samuel Parker (also Bishop of Oxford from 1686)
- 22 March 1688 – 10 October 1708 (d.): John Battely
- 28 October 1708 – 1721 (res.): Thomas Green
- 7 November 1721 – 23 August 1724 (d.): Thomas Bowers (also Bishop of Chichester from 1722)
- 1 September 1724 – 1748 (res.): Samuel Lisle (also Bishop of St Asaph from 1744)
- April 1748–4 December 1769 (d.): John Head (became Sir John Head, 5th Baronet from 1768)
- 13 December 1769 – 29 September 1788 (d.): William Backhouse
- 7 November 1788 – 1 May 1803 (d.): John Lynch
- 19 May 1803 – 8 April 1822 (d.): Houstonne Radcliffe
- 26 April 1822–bef. 1825 (res.): Hugh Percy
- 18 June 1825 – 9 May 1869 (d.): James Croft

=== Late modern ===
- 1869–November 1890 (ret.): Edward Parry (also Bishop suffragan of Dover from 1870)
- 1890–1897 (res.): Rodney Eden (also Bishop suffragan of Dover from 1890)
- bef. 1898–17 October 1918 (d.): William Walsh (also Bishop suffragan of Dover from 1898)
- 1918–1924 (res.): Leonard White-Thomson
- 1924–1939 (ret.): Edward Hardcastle (afterwards archdeacon emeritus)
- 1939–1942 (ret.): Karl Sopwith (afterwards archdeacon emeritus)
- 1942–1968 (ret.): Alexander Sargent
- 1967–1972 (res.): Michael Nott
- 1972–1981 (ret.): Bernard Pawley (afterwards archdeacon emeritus)
- 1981–1986 (res.): John Simpson
- 1986–1996 (res.): Michael Till
- 1996–2001 (res.): John Pritchard
- 2002–2007 (ret.): Patrick Evans (afterwards archdeacon emeritus)
- April 2007 – 6 January 2016 (res.): Sheila Watson
- 6 December 2015 – 22 January 2017: Philip Down and Stephen Taylor, Joint Acting Archdeacons of Canterbury.
- 22 January 2017 – 4 December 2021 (res.): Jo Kelly-Moore
- 18 July 2022 – present: William Adam

== Sources ==
- Greenway, Diana E. (1971), Fasti Ecclesiae Anglicanae 1066–1300, vol. 2, pp. 12–15
- Jones, B. (1963), Fasti Ecclesiae Anglicanae 1300–1541, vol. 4, pp. 6–9
- Horn, Joyce M. (1974), Fasti Ecclesiae Anglicanae 1541–1857, vol. 3, pp. 15–17
