= Serlo (abbot of Cirencester) =

12th-century English monk and abbot of Cirencester Abbey

Serlo (died c. 1148) was a medieval abbot of Cirencester Abbey in England as well as Dean of Salisbury.

Serlo was a canon of Salisbury Cathedral. He was a native Englishman, the son of a blacksmith named Sired. His mother was named Leoflæd. He and his mother owned land in Gloucester, which the two of them sold to Gloucester Abbey in 1129. Serlo had a son named Bartholomew, who consented to the sale in 1129.

Prior to becoming abbot he was dean of the cathedral chapter at Salisbury, appearing in documents twice as that official – once around 1116 and once in 1121. He resigned that office to become a canon at Merton Priory, where he was named in 1125 as previously dean at Salisbury. Serlo probably moved to Merton to keep an eye on the interests of Roger of Salisbury, the Bishop of Salisbury, who was instrumental in securing royal grants of privileges for the newly founded Augustinian house.

Serlo was appointed as abbot of the Augustinian house of Cirencester in 1131, which had been refounded in 1117 by King Henry I of England. Serlo was the first abbot of the newly refounded house. While abbot, Serlo secured the grant of the lands of Regenbald, a chaplain of King Edward the Confessor, to his abbey in 1133. The grant may possibly have been partly because of the efforts of Roger of Salisbury, who had a life interest in Regenbald's properties. He died on 30 January, in either 1147, 1148 or 1149. His death was remembered at Salisbury on 30 January, where he was listed as "Serlo decanus Sarum et postea abbas Cirencestriae", or "Serlo, dean of Salisbury and afterwards abbot of Cirencester". It is not clear if Roger of Salisbury acted as a patron to Serlo's career, but the historian A. F. Wareham thinks this is likely.
