= Stephen Taylor (priest) =

British priest

The Reverend Stephen Taylor
- Diocesan Secretary and Archdeacon
- Diocese: Diocese of Canterbury
- In office: 27 September 2020 – 2024
- Other posts: Canon Provost, Sunderland Minster (2000–2011); Archdeacon of Maidstone (2011–2020); Joint Acting Archdeacon of Canterbury (2015–2017)

Orders
- Ordination: 1983 (deacon); 1984 (priest)

Personal details
- Born: 2 May 1955 (age 71) Bradford, West Yorkshire
- Denomination: Anglican
- Residence: Penenden Heath, Maidstone
- Parents: Ronald & Joyce Taylor
- Spouse: Julie Anderson (m. 1981)
- Children: 4
- Education: Cranmer Hall, Durham

Stephen Ronald Taylor (born 2 May 1955) is a retired priest of the Church of England who served as Archdeacon of Maidstone and then Diocesan Secretary in the Diocese of Canterbury.

== Family and education ==
Taylor was born on 2 May 1955 to Ronald and Joyce Taylor in Bradford, Yorkshire, England. He attended Sunday School at and was confirmed at the Open Evangelical St Peter's Shipley. He was a community recreation officer in Bradford in 1978. From 1980 to 1983, he attended theological college at Cranmer Hall, Durham.

In 1981, he married Julie Anderson, a senior educational psychologist at St Peter's Shipley. They have three adult daughters and one son who predeceased his parents.

== Ordained ministry ==
Taylor was ordained in the Church of England as a deacon in 1983 and as a priest in 1984. He served his title post as an assistant curate at St Mary and St Cuthbert, Chester-le-Street in the Diocese of Durham.

His first incumbency was as vicar of St Matthew's, Newbottle (from 1988) and honorary Chaplain at Frankland Prison (from 1989) until his 1993 move to All Saints Stranton, Hartlepool, where he was a training incumbent. While there, Taylor was awarded his Master of Arts (MA) by Durham University in 1999; in the same year he became an Honorary Canon of the diocese of Rift Valley, Tanzania. In 2000, he became Canon Provost at Sunderland Minster, where he led a team of ministers in various sector ministries at the newly established "Urban Minster". During his time in that post, he also became an honorary canon at Durham Cathedral. He remained in Sunderland until his archidiaconal appointment in 2011.

Taylor was installed and collated as Archdeacon of Maidstone by Rowan Williams, Archbishop of Canterbury, in Canterbury Cathedral on 18 September 2011, and welcomed in a civic ceremony at All Saints Church, Maidstone on 25 September. As Archdeacon, he has responsibility for his archdeaconry and for "help[ing] churches better support their local communities" across the diocese, as part of the diocesan Communities and Partnership framework. From 6 December 2015 until 22 January 2017, Taylor was also Joint Acting Archdeacon of Canterbury, alongside Philip Down, Archdeacon of Ashford. Taylor took up a new appointment (ceasing to be Archdeacon of Maidstone) on 27 September 2020, as Senior Chaplain to Rose Hudson-Wilkin, Bishop of Dover, and an archdeacon (albeit without a territorial archdeaconry). On 1 January 2021, he became also Diocesan Secretary of the Diocese of Canterbury — he was originally seconded to the role in an acting capacity before the post was made substantive at a later date. He ceased to be Senior Chaplain in 2022 (probably around the time of his substantive appointment as Diocesan Secretary). In August 2023, he announced he would retire once the next Diocesan Secretary was appointed; his retirement was effective on (or around) his successor's start date, 2 April 2024.

== Charities and committees ==
Outside of his clerical posts, Taylor also: founded the Kilimatinde Trust, Tanzania in 1997; sat on the Church of England's General Synod (2000–2005); Chaired the 'Church and Society' working group for Durham and Newcastle dioceses (2005–2006); was Chairman of the Sunderland Local Partnership (2006–2011); and became an Honorary Fellow of the University of Sunderland in 2009. He was invested a Member of the Order of the British Empire (MBE) in 2009.
