= Henry Spooner =

Henry Spooner may refer to:

- Henry J. Spooner (1839–1918), U.S Representative from Rhode Island
- Henry Spooner (priest) (died 1929), Archdeacon of Maidstone
