= Philip Down =

The Reverend Philip Down
- Archdeacon of Ashford
- Diocese: Diocese of Canterbury
- In office: 13 March 2011 – 15 October 2017
- Successor: Darren Miller
- Other posts: Archdeacon of Maidstone (2002–2011); Joint Acting Archdeacon of Canterbury (2015–2017)

Orders
- Ordination: 1982 (Uniting Church in Australia minister); 1989 (Anglican deacon and priest)

Personal details
- Born: 28 March 1953 (age 73) Australia
- Denomination: Anglican (formerly Methodist)
- Parents: Keith and Ivy Down
- Spouse: Christine Oakley (m. 1972)
- Children: four
- Profession: Medical Scientist; academic (ethics)
- Education: Royal Melbourne Institute of Technology

Philip Roy Down (born 28 March 1953) is a retired priest in the Church of England. He served as the Archdeacon of Maidstone and then the first Archdeacon of Ashford, both in the Diocese of Canterbury.

== Life in Australia ==
Down was born and raised in Australia – his parents were Keith and Ivy Down. From 1971 until 1976, he was a Medical Scientist at the Austin Hospital, Melbourne. He received a Diploma in Applied Science from the Royal Melbourne Institute of Technology in 1976. In 1972, he married Christine Oakley. They have one son and three daughters. Down moved to Macleod Pathology Services in Melbourne, where he remained until 1978. Afterwards, he studied for ordained ministry at the Melbourne College of Divinity, graduating BTheol and being ordained a Uniting Church in Australia minister in 1982. He became minister in Brighton, Victoria from 1983 until his emigration and was awarded a MTheol degree by the same college in 1988.

== Career in the United Kingdom ==
Upon moving to the United Kingdom, Down became an associate Methodist minister and part-time chaplain at Scunthorpe General Hospital until 1989, in which year he was ordained as a deacon and then a priest of the Church of England. He then became an assistant curate (until 1991) and then team vicar (until 1995) in Grimsby, during which time he was awarded his MA in 1993 by the University of Hull, where he lectured in medical ethics. While in North Lincolnshire, he chaired the Research Ethics Committee of the regional NHS trust.

Since 1995, Down has ministered in Kent – initially as Rector at St Stephen's, Canterbury until 2002, during which time he was additionally Area Dean of Canterbury from 1999. He was then Archdeacon of Maidstone from 2002 until his change of post in 2011 (as part of the diocese's restructuring). Following the creation of the Ashford archdeaconry on 1 February 2011, Down was collated as archdeacon on 13 March. Besides his ordained ministry, Down has also lectured in Christian ethics in Canterbury. From 6 December 2015 until 22 January 2017, Down was also Joint Acting Archdeacon of Canterbury, alongside Stephen Taylor, Archdeacon of Maidstone.

He retired effective 15 October 2017.

== Sources ==
- Down, Philip Roy, Who's Who 2012, A & C Black, 2012; online edition, Oxford University Press, December 2011 accessed 22 March 2012
- "About Me", Philip Down, Archdeacon of Ashford, Philip Down, 2010: blogspot.co.uk, 2010 accessed 22 March 2012
