= Benjamin Smith (priest) =

Benjamin Frederick Smith (1819 - 25 March 1900) was the Archdeacon of Maidstone from 1887 until 1900.

Smith was born in Camberwell, the son of Benjamin Smith, of Great Lodge, Tonbridge, a London goldsmith, by his wife Susannah, daughter of Apsley Pellatt. His younger brother was the surgeon Sir Thomas Smith, 1st Baronet (1833–1909). Young Benjamin was educated at Blackheath Proprietary School, King's College London and Trinity College, Cambridge, from which he graduated in 1842. After a curacy at Trinity Church, Tunbridge Wells 1845–50, he was Rector of Rusthall from 1850 to 1874; and then of Crayford from 1874 until his appointment as Archdeacon. A faithful servant to the Diocese of Canterbury, he was also at various times during his long ministry Rural Dean of Dartford, Diocesan Inspector of Schools and Chaplain to the Archbishop. He was honorary Canon of Canterbury Cathedral from 1867 until 1887, when as archdeacon he also became a resident canon at the cathedral.

He died at his residence in the cathedral precincts in Canterbury on 25 March 1900.

== Works ==
Smith wrote the foreword to "Weapons Of Christian Warfare: Sermons," published in 1884.

Church of England titles
Preceded by Benjamin Harrison	Archdeacon of Maidstone; 1887–1900	Succeeded by Henry Spooner
