= Fenton Morley =

William Fenton Morley CBE was the dean of Salisbury in the Church of England from 1971 until his retirement in 1977.

Born on 5 May 1912 and educated at Oriel College, Oxford he was ordained into the priesthood in 1936. His first posts were curacies in Ely, Cardiff and Porthcawl. He then held incumbencies at Penrhiwceiber and Haseley. Following this he was director of music and lecturer in Hebrew at Ripon College Cuddesdon. From 1956 to 1961 he was precentor of Southwark Cathedral and then Vicar of Leeds Parish Church until his appointment as dean. He chaired the 1967 Morley Commission for the Church of England. He was appointed a Commander of the Order of the British Empire (CBE) in the 1980 Birthday Honours. He died on 9 July 1995.

Church of England titles
Preceded by Kenneth William Haworth	Dean of Salisbury; 1971 –1977	Succeeded by Sydney Hall Evans
