= Darren Miller (priest) =

English Anglican priest

Darren Noel Miller (born 1967) is a Church of England priest who has been the Archdeacon of Ashford in the Diocese of Canterbury since his collation on 13 January 2018.

Miller was educated at Birmingham University, the College of the Resurrection, Mirfield and Chichester Theological College. He was ordained deacon in 1996, and priest in 1997. After curacies in Weoley Castle and Shard End he was Vicar of Castle Vale from 2000 until 2006. He was then Team Rector of Cheam, a post he held for eleven years.
