= William Warham (Archdeacon of Canterbury) =

English ecclesiastical administrator

William Warham (c. 1480 – 1557) was a late-medieval English ecclesiastical administrator who was Archdeacon of Canterbury from c. 1505 to 1532 during the archiepiscopate of his uncle William Warham, Archbishop of Canterbury.

== Early career ==
Warham's date of birth is not known but is likely to be around 1480 as he took up office as archdeacon c. 1505. His predecessor Hugh Peynthwyn died on 25 July 1504 but William did not officiate as archdeacon at his uncle's enthronement in 1505 and so was probably not appointed until after the enthronement.

William Warham was probably educated, like his uncle, at Winchester College and New College, Oxford. He must have trained as a canon lawyer, in view of his duties as archdeacon and the books which survive from his library.

== Archdeacon of Canterbury ==
As archdeacon, he was the archbishop's senior administrator, both in ecclesiastical matters and at the national political level where he took part in diplomatic missions for King Henry VIII, often in association with Cardinal Thomas Wolsey. Although he was not a priest (acquiring a papal dispensation to allow him to hold his offices), he accumulated many additional benefices and offices, including:

- 1511: rector of Orpington;
- 1515–1516: St Paul's Cathedral: prebendary of Brownswood; from 1516 to his death prebendary of Newingham;
- 1516–1557: Exeter Cathedral: canon;
- 1516: rector of Hayes near Croydon;
- 1520–1532: provost of the College of Wingham;
- 1526–1527: vicar of Shoreham, Kent;
- 1527–1532: rector of Wrotham, Kent;
- 1532–1537: rector of Harrow-on-the-Hill, in Middlesex;

He is also on record as being the patron of the Poor Priests Hospital, Canterbury, with the church of St Mary (1528), and as patron of Westhithe (1531), and of St Clement's, Sandwich, (1531).

== Later career ==
Following his uncle's death, he resigned the archdeaconry and some of his Kentish benefices and moved to Middlesex. He appears to have occupied an important residence at St George's Chapel, Windsor. From about 1537, he had a licence to be non-resident and went abroad, apparently on government intelligence business. William Warham died in October 1557, according to the dates of appointment of his successors to the canonries of St Paul's and Exeter.
