= Houstonne Radcliffe =

Houstonne Radcliffe, D.D. (b Liverpool 1739 – d Canterbury 1822) was Archdeacon of Canterbury from 19 May 1803 until his death on 8 April 1822.

Radcliffe was educated at Brasenose College, Oxford, where he matriculated in 1758, graduating B.A. in 1761 and becoming a Fellow. He held livings at Gillingham, Kent, Mersham and Ickham.
