= Jane Timbury =

British novelist and poet

Jane Timbury (died c. 1792), was an English novelist and poet whose books were published between 1770 and 1791.

== Work ==
Timbury’s novel The Male-coquette (1770) appeared anonymously, but was republished in 1788 as The Male Coquet with Timbury’s name added to the title page. It has been called an attempt to bring together various strains and resolve them into a new ideal of husband and gentleman.

Timbury’s The story of Le Fevre, from the works of Mr. Sterne (1787) attempted to increase the drama of Laurence Sterne's work by putting it into verse, but has been judged to "contort Tristram’s spontaneous profession of whimsicality into pedestrian metre and verse". Her book of verse, The History of Tobit, self-published in 1787, included a long list of subscribers, among whom were Samuel Arnold and Jeremy Bentham.

== Life ==
Little is known of Timbury. In The History of Tobit (1787), the author’s address is given as "Petty France, Westminster".

She may be the Jane Timbury of Fetter Lane whose burial on 25 January 1792 is recorded at St Andrew’s, Holburn, just outside the City of London. A Mr J. Timbury of Holborn was one of the subscribers to The History of Tobit five years before, while another Mr Timbury, of Dummer, subscribed for ten copies.

== Selected works ==
- The Male-coquette: Or, the History of the Hon. Edward Astell (London: G. Robinson and J. Roberts, 1770, new edition by Gale ECCO Print Editions, 2010 ISBN 978-1170655337)
- The History of Tobit; a Poem. With Other Poems on Various Subjects (Westminster: the Author, Petty France, 1787)
- The story of Le Fevre, from the works of Mr. Sterne. Put into verse by Jane Timbury (London, 1787; new edition by Gale ECCO Print Editions, 2010 ISBN 978-1170527863)
- The Triumph of Friendship; or, The History of Charles Courtney and Miss Julia Melville (Westminster: James Fox, 1789)
- The Philanthropic Rambler, etc. (London: J. Timbury, J. Southern, & W. Nicoll, 1790)
- A Sequel to the Philanthropic Rambler (London: G.G.J. & J. Robinson, R. Faulder, J. Southern, 1791)
