= Thomas Prichard (priest, born 1910) =

Anglican priest (1910–1975)

Thomas Estlin Prichard (20 December 1910 – 8 August 1975) was the Archdeacon of Maidstone from 1968 until 1972

Prichard was educated at Clifton College and Exeter College, Oxford; and ordained in 1934. After curacies in Lambeth and Ashford he was Vicar of Boxley from 1943 to 1954; and then of Thanet from 1954 to 1968.

Church of England titles
Preceded by Michael Nott	Archdeacon of Maidstone; 1968–1972	Succeeded by Niel Nye
