= Julian Bickersteth =

English Anglican priest, military chaplain and headmaster

The Reverend Canon Julian Bickersteth MC QHC
- Archdeacon of Maidstone
- Church: Church of England
- Province: Province of Canterbury
- Diocese: Diocese of Canterbury
- In office: 1942 to 1958
- Predecessor: Alexander Sargent
- Successor: Gordon Strutt

Personal details
- Born: Kenneth Julian Faithfull Bickersteth; 5 July 1885 Ripon, Yorkshire, England
- Died: 16 October 1962 (aged 77) Canterbury, Kent, England
- Denomination: Anglicanism
- Military career
- Allegiance: United Kingdom
- Branch: British Army
- Service years: 1915–1920
- Rank: Chaplain to the Forces 3rd Class
- Conflicts: First World War: Western Front; Battle of the Somme
- Awards: Mentioned in Despatches; Military Cross

Kenneth Julian Faithfull Bickersteth, MC, QHC (5 July 1885 – 16 October 1962) was an English Anglican priest, military chaplain, and headmaster from the prominent Bickersteth family. He served as Archdeacon of Maidstone from 1942 to 1958. In 1953, he was appointed Honorary Chaplain to the Queen.

== Early life and education ==
Bickersteth was born in 1885 in Ripon, Yorkshire, England, into a prominent ecclesiastical family. He was one of six sons born to The Rev. Canon Samuel Bickersteth (1857–1937) and Ella Chlora Faithfull Monier-Williams (1858–1954). His mother was the daughter of academic Sir Monier Monier-Williams, and she was "one of the five or six little girls in Oxford on whom Lewis Carroll modelled his Alice in Wonderland". His nephew was Bishop John Bickersteth.

Bickersteth was educated at Rugby School, then an all-boys public school in Rugby, Warwickshire. He studied mathematics at Christ Church, Oxford. He graduated from the University of Oxford in 1907 with a Bachelor of Arts (BA) degree; as per tradition, his BA was promoted to a Master of Arts (MA Oxon).

After completing his undergraduate degree, Bickersteth spent a year teaching English in the British Raj. He decided to enter the clergy and returned to England. He then entered Wells Theological College, an Anglican theological college to train for ordained ministry. As a graduate, he only needed to spend one-year training before ordination.

== Career ==
=== Early ministry ===
Bickersteth was ordained in the Church of England as a deacon in 1909 and as a priest in 1910. From 1909 to 1912, he served his curacy at St Andrew's Church, Rugby, which was then in the Diocese of Worcester. In 1912, he first moved to Australia where he had been appointed the chaplain to Melbourne Church of England Grammar School, an independent boarding school in Melbourne.

=== Military service ===
In 1915, one year after the start of the First World War, Bickersteth returned to England with the intention of becoming a military chaplain. As a temporary chaplain to the forces, he served with the British Expeditionary Force on the Western Front. His duties included taking services in makeshift chapels, caring for the wounded, ministering to men condemned to execution, and taking burials; he took seventy on the second day of the Battle of the Somme. He found himself preparing men for confirmation one day and then burying them the next. He first served as chaplain to The Rangers, British Army, and then as senior chaplain to the 56th (London) Infantry Division. He ended the war as a deputy assistant chaplain-general (equivalent in rank to lieutenant colonel) attached to the XV Corps.

On 9 June 1917, Bickersteth was mentioned in despatches by Field Marshal Sir Douglas Haig. On 1 January 1918, he was awarded the Military Cross (MC) "for distinguished service in the Field". Though he was immediately given the ribbon to wear on his uniform, he had to wait till 1919 to receive the medal itself. That year, during a ceremony at Buckingham Palace, he stood side by side with one of his brothers as they were both awarded the Military Cross by George V. Having reached the rank of chaplain to the forces third class (equivalent to major), he relinquished his commission on 20 February 1920 and was allowed to keep his rank on an honorary basis.

=== Post-war service ===
Between the wars, Bickersteth returned to teaching. In 1919, he was offered the position of headmaster of The Collegiate School of St Peter in Adelaide, Australia, which he accepted without ever attending an interview. Following his arrival at the school in 1920, he increased pupil numbers from 550 to 720, and "built a war memorial hall, science laboratories, and several boarding-houses". He was also involved in the wider education sphere of Australia: he was the driving force behind the first residential college of the University of Adelaide (St. Mark's College) which opened in 1925, and he co-founded the Headmasters' Conference of the Independent Schools of Australia in 1931. He also continued his military service and was a senior chaplain to the Australian Military Forces between 1928 and 1933.

He was then headmaster of Felsted School in Essex, England. From 1942 to 1958, he served as Archdeacon of Maidstone in the Diocese of Canterbury, Church of England. On 3 November 1953, Bickersteth was appointed an Honorary Chaplain to the Queen (QHC).

He died at Kent and Canterbury Hospital in 1962.

Church of England titles
Preceded by Alexander Sargent	Archdeacon of Maidstone; 1942–1958	Succeeded by Gordon Strutt
