= Michael Percival Smith =

Anthony Michael Percival Smith (called Michael; 5 September 1924 – 27 September 2013) was Archdeacon of Maidstone from 1979 until 30 September 1989.

Percival Smith was educated at Shrewsbury and then served in the Rifle Brigade from 1942 to 1946. When peace returned he continued his education at Gonville and Caius College, Cambridge and Westcott House, Cambridge. He was ordained deacon in 1950, and priest in 1951. After a curacy at Holy Trinity, Leamington he was Domestic Chaplain to the Archbishop of Canterbury from 1953 to 1957. He held incumbencies at Upper Norwood (1957–1966), Yeovil (1966–1972) and Addiscombe (1972–1979).

Church of England titles
Preceded by Niel Nye	Archdeacon of Maidstone; 1979–1989	Succeeded by Patrick Evans
