= Sydney Hall Evans =

English Anglican priest

Sydney Hall Evans, CBE (23 July 1915 – 6 January 1988) was the Dean of Salisbury in the Church of England from 1977 until his retirement in 1986.

== Early life ==
Born on 23 July 1915, Hall Evans was educated at Bristol Grammar School and Durham University, where he was President of the Durham Union during the Michaelmas term of 1937.

== Career ==
Ordained to the priesthood in 1940, his first posts were curacies in Bishop Auckland and Ferryhill. He was then a Chaplain in the Royal Air Force Volunteer Reserve from 1943 to 1945. Following this, he became Warden of King's College London's post-graduate college at Warminster, and then from 1956 was Dean of King's until 1977, when he was elevated to the Deanery of Salisbury.

Hall Evans's career at King's made him one of the most influential churchmen of his generation, as he trained over one thousand Anglican priests. He was primarily a pastor and a nurturer of the potential he saw in people. He personally interviewed candidates for the Theology course at King's and made offers of places in advance of 'A'-level results. A low requirement, of perhaps only two 'A'-levels, would ensure that many men got their only chance of a university education. The first year at King's was designed to sort 'the sheep from the goats', so that some would continue to the degree and ordination qualification combined (BD/AKC), with others pursuing the AKC alone for ordination.

He retired as Dean of Salisbury in 1986 and at the time of his death on 6 January 1988 was living in Winchester. He left an estate valued at £116,000.

Church of England titles
Preceded by William Fenton Morley	Dean of Salisbury; 1977–1986	Succeeded by Hugh Geoffrey Dickinson
