= Niel Nye =

Niel (Nathaniel Kemp) Nye (4 November 1914 – 9 January 2003) was the Archdeacon of Maidstone from 1972 to 1979.

Nye was educated at Merchant Taylors' School, Northwood, King's College London and Ripon College Cuddesdon. He was ordained deacon in 1937, and priest in 1938. After a curacy at St Peter on the St Helier Estate in the Diocese of Southwark he was a Chaplain in the RAF, from 1940 during which he was a Prisoner of war in Italy. He was Rector of Holy Trinity, Clapham from 1946 to 1954; Vicar of his old church on the St Helier Estate from 1954 to 60; and then Vicar of All Saints, Maidstone (Rural Dean) from 1960 until 1966; and then Tait Missioner for the Canterbury Diocese from 1966 until his appointment as Archdeacon.

His Times obituary described him as an

"influential pastor who combined commitment to his parishioners with deep personal devotion in an exemplary Anglican ministry which influenced several generations of clergy and laity alike"

Church of England titles
Preceded by Thomas Prichard	Archdeacon of Maidstone; 1972–1979	Succeeded by Michael Percival Smith
