= William Kingsley =

English Anglican priest

William Kingsley, D.D. was an Anglican priest in the 17th century.

Lever was born in London and educated at Magdalen College, Oxford. He was Archdeacon of Canterbury from 10 April 1619 until his death on 29 January 1648.
