= New Annual Register =

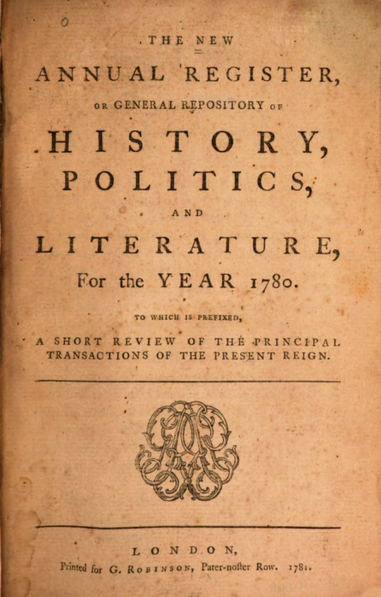
The New Annual Register (1780, London)

The New Annual Register (subtitled, "Or General Repository of History, Politics and Literature for the Year...") was an annual reference work, founded in 1780 by Andrew Kippis in London, England. It recorded and analysed the year's major events, developments and trends, throughout the world, as a rival to the Annual Register appearing from 1758, under the editorship of Edmund Burke. After Kippis died in 1795 it was taken on by Thomas Morgan (1752–1821). George Gregory edited it, and changed its Whig politics to Tory at the time of the Addington ministry. It was published until 1825.

The Register was published by George Robinson from 1781. From 1784 to 1791 William Godwin was writing the British historical section.
