= St Mary's Church, Wingham =

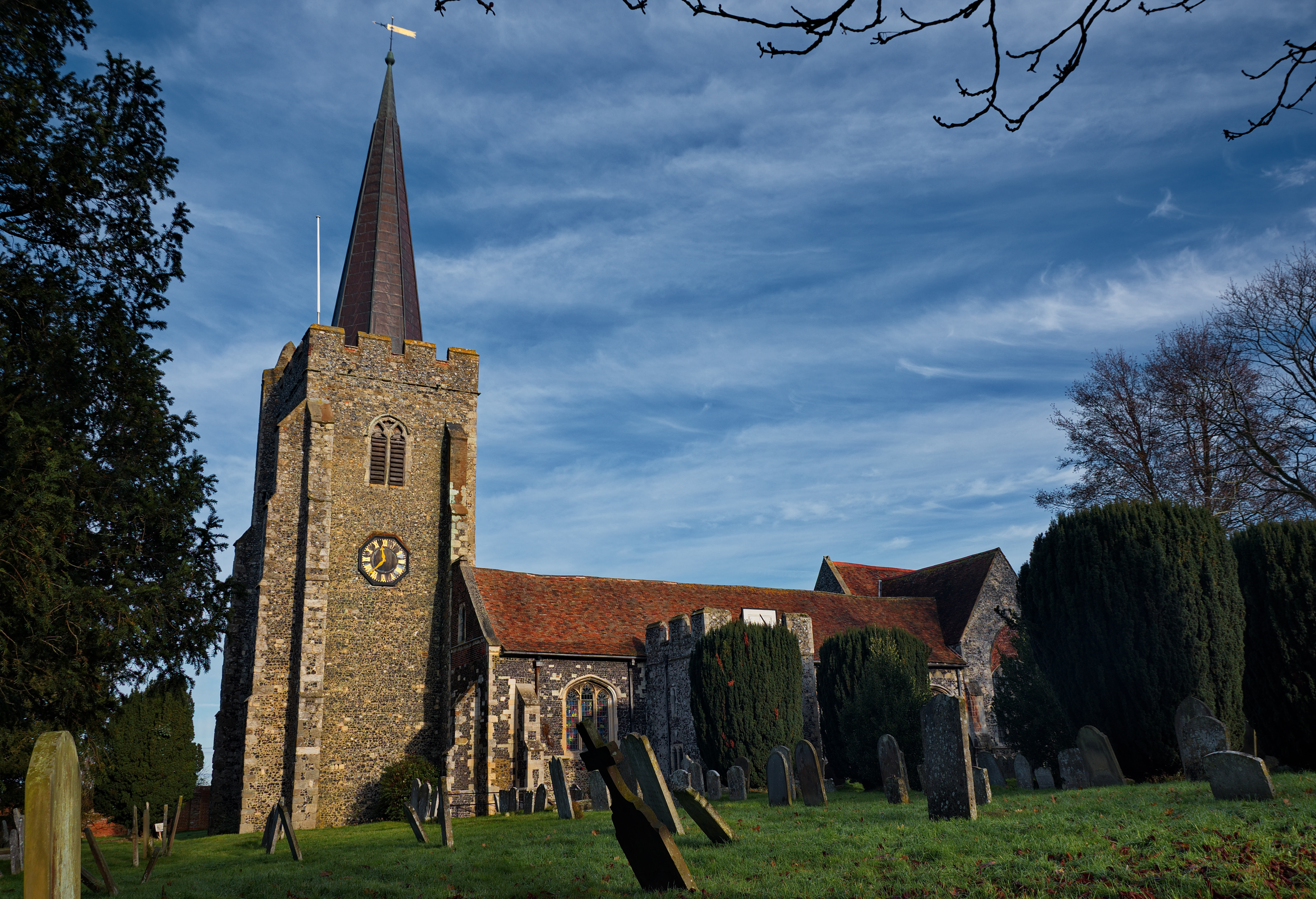
- St Mary's Church, Wingham

- Location in Kent
- 51.2723°N 1.2129°E
- OS grid reference: TR 24212 57474
- Location: Wingham, Kent
- Country: England
- Denomination: Church of England

History
- Dedication: St Mary the Virgin

Architecture
- Heritage designation: Grade I listed
- Designated: 11 October 1963

Specifications
- Materials: Flint, both knapped and coursed with rubble stone

Administration
- Province: Canterbury
- Diocese: Canterbury
- Archdeaconry: Canterbury
- Deanery: East Bridge
- Parish: Wingham

St Mary's Church, Wingham, is an Anglican parish church in Wingham, Kent. It is recorded in the National Heritage List for England as a designated Grade I listed building.

== History and architecture ==
The church dates from the early 13th century, however many elements of the church vary in date. The east sections, the chancel and transeptal chapels, all belong to the late 13th century. The tower as well as the transepts date to the 14th century, while the nave and south aisle belong to the mid 16th century. The historian John Newman goes into more detail: the earliest features of the church are the west arches of the north chapel (all now being blocked), as well as the south transept, all being built in the late 12th century. The north and west walls of the north chapel contain reused Early Norman masonry. By around the turn of the 13th century, the church had grown to include an aisled nave, as well as either transepts or chancel chapels. Benjamin Ferrey's provided restoration work on the church between 1874 and 1875, however this work dealt only on the chancel in the east.

The chancel and transepts were rebuilt as a result of the college foundation process. This can be best studied in the architecture of the south transept; the window of the shallow east projection is unrestored. The window was three-light, featuring three circles in the head, each being enclosed by three pointed trefoils. The chancel arch and the chancel's east window were restored during Ferrey's 1874-1875 work. The north chapel was originally duplicated from the south transept; both chapels open into the chancel through identical arches in an Early English style. There exists a two-storey eastward extension of the north transept, dating to the 15th century; the north window of this extension is timber, possibly dating to the 18th century. The chancel windows stand upon a continuous string course, retaining their original houd moulds. The east piscina and the triple sedilia are cinquefoiled, featuring flattened arches upon detached shafts, as well as moulded caps and bases.

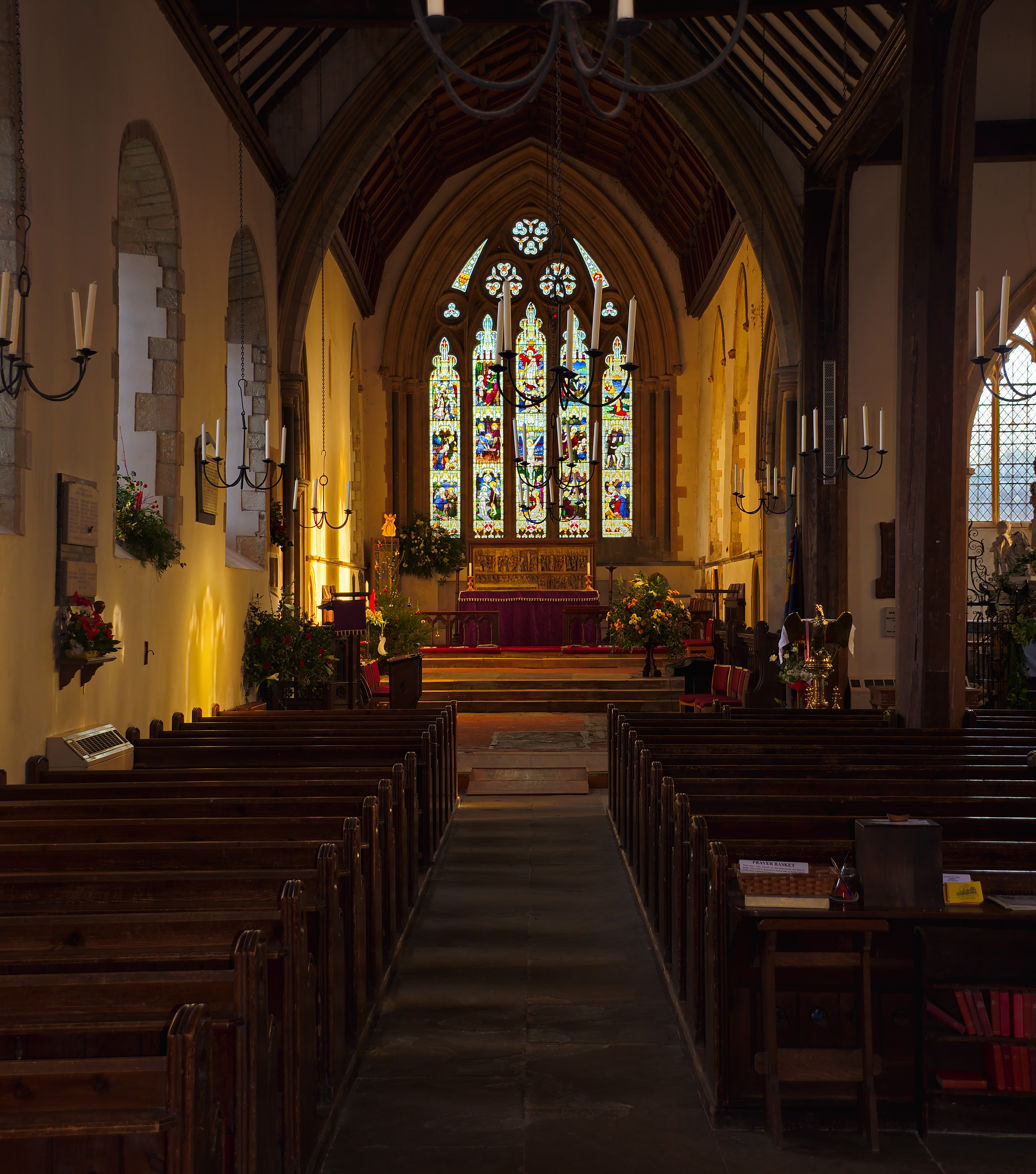
The chancel and nave of the church

The west tower begun construction during the late 13th century; this is evident in the remains of the lancets in the lower stage. The spire is recessed and dates to the 14th century; it reaches a height of 63 feet, and is built in a Hertfordshire style. Angle buttresses are present almost to the top. A stair-turret is built into the northwest of the tower. The west window is renewed. There is a tower arch high up, on octagonal responds with the capitals dotted with four-petalled flowers.

Rebuilding of the nave and the south aisle began in the late 15th century, with the 14th-century south porch being retained as a two-storey structure, minus its upper floor. The north aisle however was not rebuilt, giving the church its current unique shape. The walls of these reconstructed sections are of knapped flint and are carefully laid; triangular stones can be found set into the south wall. This reconstruction work was continued slowly, and last until well after the Dissolution of the Monasteries; there are regular bequests to the rebuilding recorded between 1526 and 1562. Work was underway during the 1540s, however in 1555 money meant for the rebuilding was embezzled by a local beer brewer. This resulted in the arcade being completed in timber instead of the intended stone: the piers are unmoulded posts, braced weakly. At some point before the 19th century, the braces were dressed up in plaster so as to look like Doric columns; during Ferrey's restoration work the braces were undressed again.

== Fittings ==
The church possesses a 15th-century stone reredos (altar back), purportedly from Troyes in France; above are five scenes of the Passion of Christ, and below is the Last Supper and Adoration of the Kings; the lower two occupy the same length as the Passion scenes above. The base to a 15th-century rood screen is present. There are four misericords (supports on a wooden seat) on the north side, as well as three on the south side; the latter are older, probably dating to the early 14th century. The chancel's south window contains early 14th century grisaille glass in the head. The east window contains stained glass dating to 1919, depicting multiple brightly coloured scenes of the Passion.

== Monuments ==
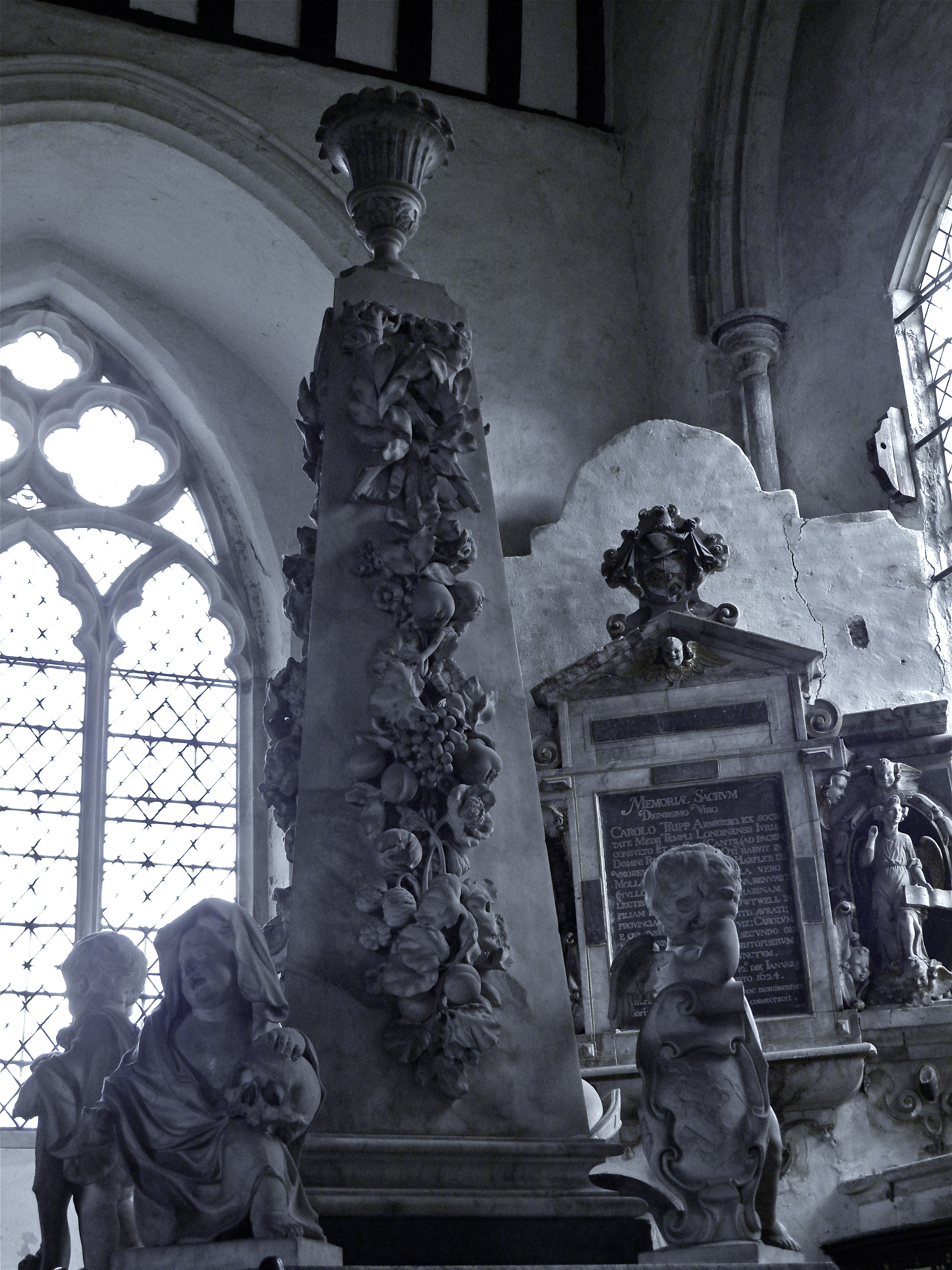
The Oxenden Memorial

A monument to Charles Tripp (died 1624) exists in the south chapel, in the form of a tablet that is largely identical to that of another monument in St James the Great, Elmsted. A monument to Sir Thomas Palmer (dated to 1624) lies in the east of the north chapel; this was sculpted by Nicholas Stone. A monument was erected for the Oxenden family, dated to 1682 and free-standing in the centre of the south transept. A monument to a second Thomas Palmer (died 1656) exists in the north chapel; this monument was erected in 1718. A double tablet monument was erected for Streynsham Master (died 1718) exists in the north chapel. A tablet monument to Thomas Cinder (died 1719) is erected in the south aisle. A more recent monument was erected for William Miller (died 1861).

== St Mary's College, Wingham ==
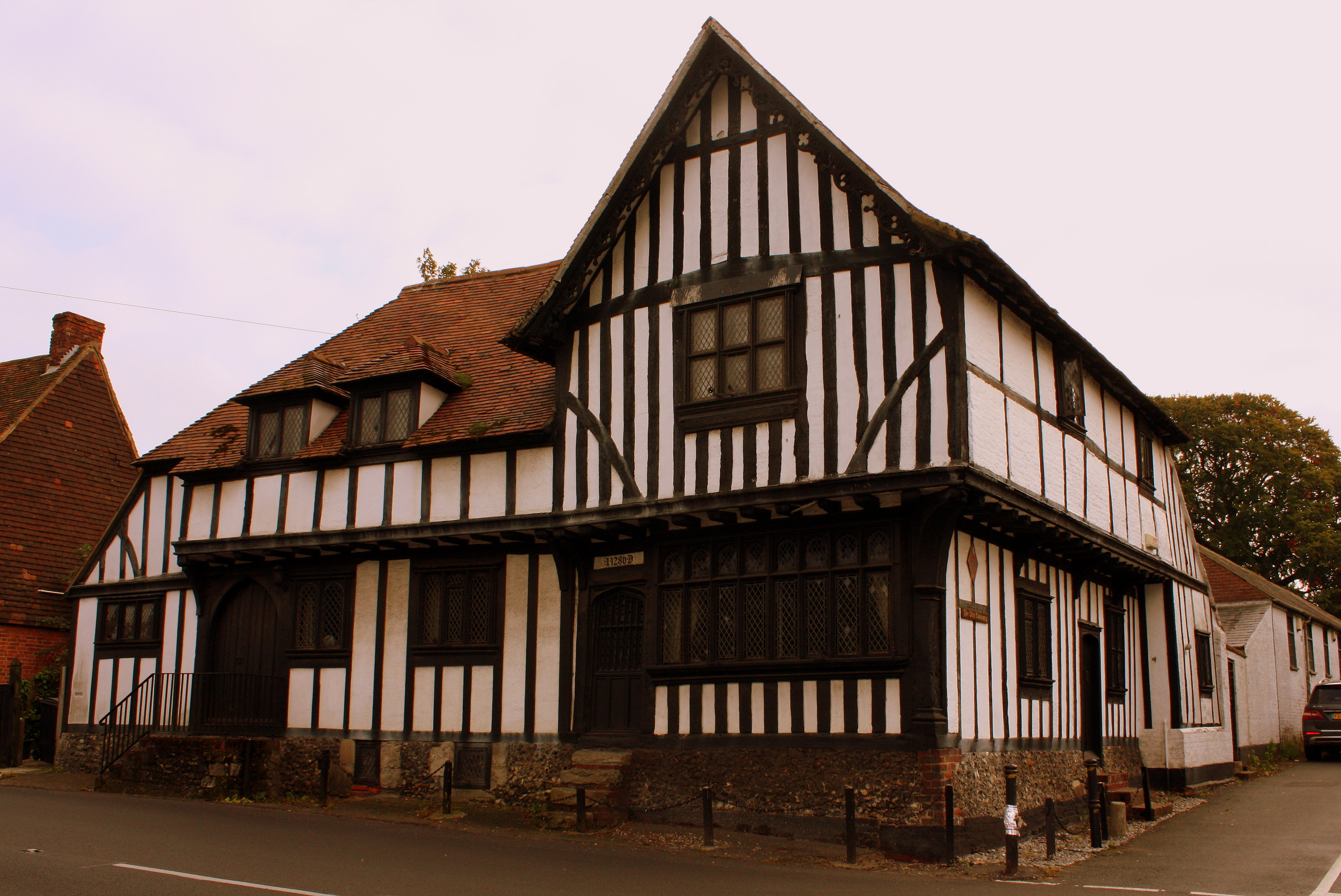
The Old Canonry, Wingham. Possibly one of the residences for the Canons of the College

In 1282 a College of Canons was founded by John Peckham, Archbishop of Canterbury. The college originally consisted of a Provost and six canons, and they used St Mary's as their church. It survived as a collegiate institution until the dissolution of colleges and chantries in 1548.

=== Provosts of Wingham ===
- Peter de Geldeford 1287 - ca. 1298
- James de Gobeham
- Amedeus de Sancto Johanne ca. 1301, ca. 1305
- William de Handle ca. 1306–1317
- Walter de Kemeseye 1317 - ca. 1318
- John de Brutpn ca. 1321
- John de Bourne ca. 1344–1351
- Robert de Solbery 1351–1359
- William de Tratynton 1359
- John de Severley 1359–1365
- William Reade 1365
- John Saxon 1368
- John Fordham ca. 1374
- William de Wyndesore 1374–1401
- Andrew Yonge 1401
- Gwido or Guy Harefelde 1424
- Matthew Assheton ca. 1434
- Thomas Moonie ca. 1436
- Thomas Rotheram ca. 1467
- John Coppyng until 1495
- Thomas Morton 1495
- Henry Ediall ca.1511- 1520
- William Warham 1520–1532
- Edmund Cranmer ca. 1535

== Organ ==
The church has three manual pipe organ dating from 1886 by Forster and Andrews. A specification of the organ can be found on the National Pipe Organ Register.

== Parish Status ==
The church is part of a joint benefice which includes: St Vincent Of Saragossa, Littlebourne, St Andrew's, Wickhambreaux and St John's Ickham
