= John Lynch (archdeacon of Canterbury) =

18th-century clergyman

John Lynch (1735 in Lambeth – 1803 in Canterbury) was an English churchman, Archdeacon of Canterbury from 1788 until his death on 1 May 1803.

The son of John Lynch (1697–1760), he was educated at Christ Church, Oxford, matriculating there in 1753, and graduating B.A. in 1757. He held livings at All Hallows, Bread Street and St Dionis Backchurch, both in the City of London.
