= Andrew Burn =

English clergyman

Andrew Ewbank Burn (17 January 1864 – 28 November 1927) was an English clergyman in the Church of England, Dean of Salisbury from 1920 until his death in 1927.

Born in Bareilly on 17 January 1864 and educated at Charterhouse and Trinity College, Cambridge, Andrew Burn was ordained into the priesthood in 1888. His first posts were curacies at St Cuthbert, Bensham and St Andrew, Auckland after which he was Rector of Kynnersley, Rural Dean of Edgmond, a Prebendary of Lichfield Cathedral and an Honorary Chaplain to the King before his elevation to the Deanery. An eminent theologian, he died on 28 November 1927.

His son in law was later Bishop of Madras.

== Works ==
- Niceta of Remesiana, His Life and Works, 1905
- The Athanasian Creed and its early Commentaries, 1906
- The Crown of Thorns, 1911
- The Council of Nicaea: a memorial for its sixteenth centenary, 1926

Church of England titles
Preceded by William Page Roberts	Dean of Salisbury; 1920 –1927	Succeeded by John Hugh Granville Randolph
