= Alexander Sargent =

Alexander Sargent (9 May 1895 – 5 January 1989) was an eminent Anglican clergyman in the mid 20th century.

He was born on 9 May 1895, educated at The King's School, Canterbury and St Edmund Hall, Oxford and ordained in 1920. After curacies at St Margaret's at Cliffe and Maidstone he became Chaplain of Ripon College Cuddesdon. He was then Sub-Warden of St Paul's College, Grahamstown and after that Resident Chaplain to the Archbishop of Canterbury. In 1939 he was appointed Archdeacon of Maidstone and in 1942 Archdeacon of Canterbury. He retired in 1968 and died on 5 January 1989.

Church of England titles
Preceded by Karl Sopwith	Archdeacon of Maidstone; 1939 to 1942	Succeeded by Julian Bickersteth
Preceded by Thomas Karl Sopwith	Archdeacon of Canterbury; 1942 to 1968	Succeeded by Michael John Nott
