= Kenneth Haworth =

Kenneth William Haworth was the dean of Salisbury in the Church of England from 1960 until his retirement in 1971.

Born on 21 January 1903 and educated at Cheltenham College and Clare College, Cambridge, he was ordained to the priesthood in 1926. His first post was as a curate at St Giles' Willenhall after which he was domestic chaplain to the Bishop of Lichfield then rector of Baunton. From 1947 to 1960 he was principal at Wells Theological College before his appointment as dean. He died on 22 April 1988.

Church of England titles
Preceded by Robert Hamilton Moberly	Dean of Salisbury; 1960 –1971	Succeeded by William Fenton Morley
