= Thomas Sopwith (disambiguation) =

Thomas Sopwith (1888–1989) was an aviator and yachtsman.

Thomas Sopwith may also refer to:

- Thomas Sopwith (geologist) (1803–1879), grandfather of the aviator
- Tommy Sopwith (racing driver) (1932–2019), son of the aviator
- Thomas Karl Sopwith (1873–1945), Anglican clergyman
