= Michael Nott =

British priest

Michael John Nott (9 November 1916 – 3 February 1988) was an Anglican priest.

Nott was born in 1916, educated at St Paul's and King's College London and ordained in 1939. His first posts were at Abington, Reading and Kettering. Following this he was Rural Dean of Seaford, Senior Chaplain to the Archbishop of Canterbury and then Archdeacon of Maidstone and a canon residentiary of Canterbury Cathedral. In 1972 he became Provost of Portsmouth. He resigned in 1982.

Church of England titles
| Preceded by Gordon Strutt | Archdeacon of Maidstone; 1965 – 1967 | Succeeded by Thomas Prichard |
| Preceded by Alexander Sargent | Archdeacon of Canterbury; 1967 – 1972 | Succeeded by Bernard Pawley |
| Preceded by Eric Noel Porter Goff | Provost of Portsmouth; 1972 – 1982 | Succeeded by David Staffurth Stancliffe |
