= Edward Hardcastle (priest) =

Anglican clergyman

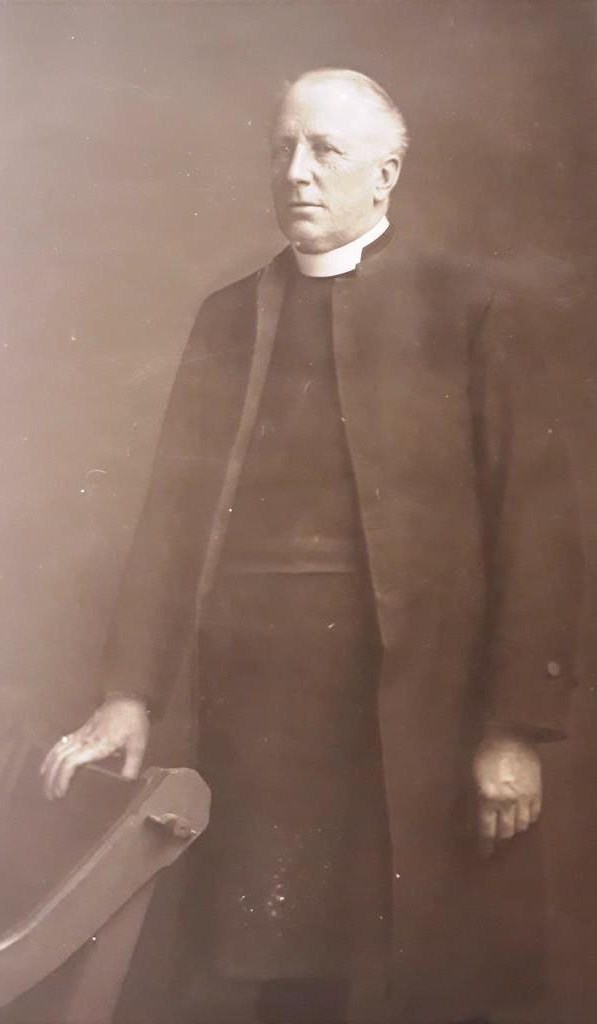
Edward Hardcastle, Archdeacon of Canterbury

Edward Hoare Hardcastle (6 March 1862 – 20 May 1945) was an Anglican clergyman in the late 19th and first half of the 20th century.

Son of Conservative politician Edward Hardcastle and his wife Priscilla Hoare, Harcastle was educated at Winchester and Trinity College, Cambridge and ordained in 1887. After a curacy at St George's Ramsgate he was Vicar of Weston, Bath. From 1901 to 1904 he was Rector of St Martin's Church, Canterbury and was subsequently Vicar of Maidstone. After being appointed an honorary canon of Canterbury Cathedral in 1915, in 1924 he was appointed Archdeacon of Canterbury, a post he held until 1939 when he retired.

Hardcastle was a keen sportsman who played in two first-class cricket matches for Kent County Cricket Club in 1883 and 1884. After taking three wickets in the first innings of his first match, he was unsuccessful as a bowler and scored only 12 runs in first-class cricket. He had played cricket at school and in the freshman's match at Cambridge, and played for a number of other teams in minor matches, including Marylebone Cricket Club (MCC), the Gentlemen of Kent, Worcestershire, Free Foresters and Band of Brothers as a left-arm fast bowler. He served on the General Committee at Kent between 1939 and 1945.

Hardcastle's first wife, Harriet Crompton, died in 1892, a year after their marriage. He later married the Hon Alice Goschen, second daughter of the 1st Viscount Goschen in 1900. The couple had five children.

He died at Brighton in 1945 aged 83. His daughter, Monica Alice Hardcastle, was assistant advisor in religious education for the Diocese of Chichester from 1931 to 1948 and then Principal of St Christopher's College, Blackheath until her retirement in 1963.

== Bibliography ==
- Carlaw, Derek (2020). Kent County Cricketers, A to Z: Part One (1806–1914) (PDF). Cardiff: ACS.

Church of England titles
Preceded by Leonard Jauncey White-Thomson	Archdeacon of Canterbury; 1924 –- 1939	Succeeded by Thomas Karl Sopwith
