= George Robinson (bookseller) =

George Robinson (bapt. 20 December 1736 – 6 June 1801) was an English bookseller and publisher working in London.

Robinson published The Lady's Magazine and a serial reference work, The New Annual Register, as well as fiction and non-fiction. He was also known for publishing books written by women.

== Life ==
Robinson was baptised at Dalston, Cumberland, in December 1736, and about 1755 migrated to London in search of work. John Nichols later said that Robinson came with "a decent education, and a great share of natural sense and shrewdness."

He was an assistant to John Rivington (1720–1792), a publisher in St Paul's Churchyard, and later worked for a Mr. Johnstone on Ludgate Hill. In about 1763 he and a friend, John Roberts, went into business in Paternoster Row as booksellers. In setting himself up in business, Robinson had the support of Thomas Longman, "who liberally, and unasked, offered him any sum, on credit, that might be wanted". His partner, Roberts, died about 1776.

From bookselling, Robinson turned also to publishing and bought many copyrights. This was on his own account, and only rarely in partnership with Roberts. In 1773, he became the printer and publisher of The Lady's Magazine. By 1780, he was also a large book wholesaler. From 1781, he was the publisher of the New Annual Register. In 1784, he took his son George into the business, making him a partner, and also his much younger brother John (1753–1813).

Robinson printed John Ferdinand Smyth Stuart's book A Tour in the United States of America (1784), for which Smyth Stuart was to pay £160.

On 26 November 1793, Robinson's company was fined for selling copies of Thomas Paine's Rights of Man.

A radical, in 1794 Robinson published Ann Radcliffe's The Mysteries of Udolpho, for which he paid her the generous sum of £500, equivalent to £58,735 in 2020, and later also bought her A Journey Made in the Summer of 1794.

Thomas Cadell said of George Robinson's integrity that "too much cannot be said." Another bookseller, William West, recorded some anecdotes of Robinson and his hospitality at his villa at Streatham, calling him "the Prince, nay, the King of Booksellers".

Robinson died in Paternoster Row on 6 June 1801. His son and his brother continued the business, but George died in 1811 and John in 1813.

== Some books published ==
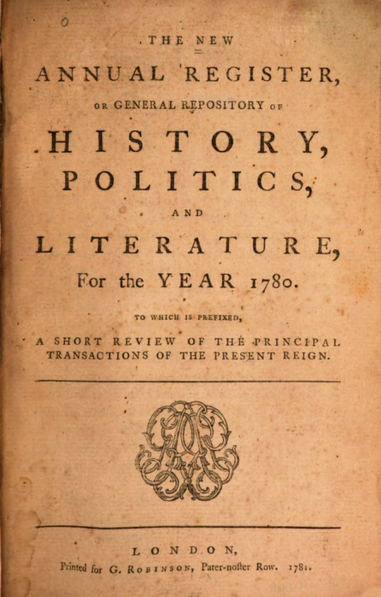
The New Annual Register

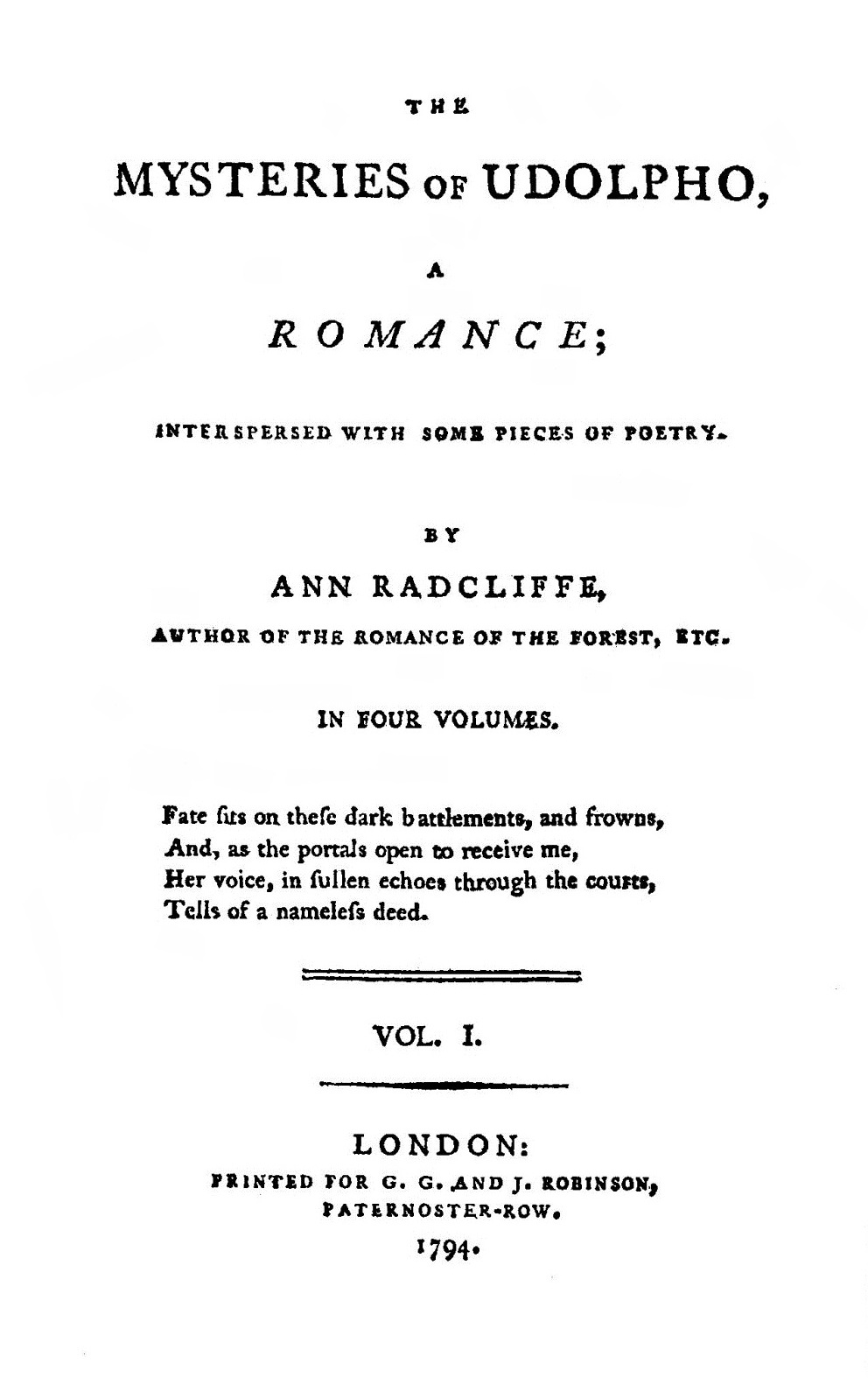
The Mysteries of Udolpho

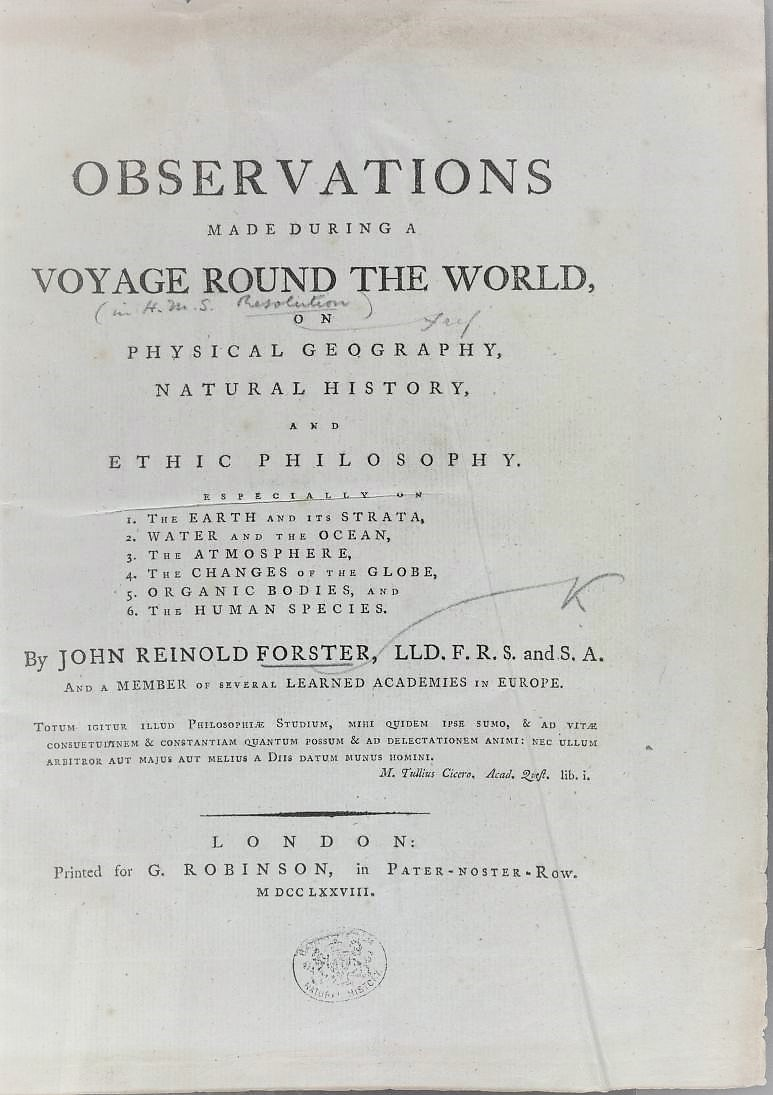
Observations Made during a Voyage round the World

- Jane Timbury, but published anonymously, The Male-coquette:, or the History of the Hon. Edward Astell (G. Robinson and J. Roberts, 1770)
- Thomas Slack, The Banker's Sure Guide; or Monied Man's Assistant (third edition, 1772)
- Benjamin Gooch, Medical and chirurgical observations, as an appendix to a former publication (1773)
- Richard Chandler, Travels in Asia Minor, 1764-1765 (1775)
- Nicholas Machiavel, The Works of Nicholas Machiavel, Secretary of State to the Republic of Florence (1775)
- Miscellaneous Dissertations on Rural subjects (1775)
- Antoine-Yves Goguet, The Origin of Laws, Arts, and Sciences, and their Progress among the most Ancient Nations (1775)
- Joseph Priestley, The History and Present State of Electricity, with original experiments (new edition, 1775)
- Richard Chandler, Travels in Greece : or an account of a tour made at the expense of the Society of Dilettanti (1775)
- Salomon Gessner, New Idylles (1776)
- Thomas Warton, The Oxford sausage: or, Select poetical pieces, written by the most celebrated wits of the University of Oxford (1777)
- Johann Reinhold Forster, Observations Made during a Voyage round the World (1778)
- Maximilien de Béthune, Duke of Sully, Memoirs of Maximilian de Bethune, Duke of Sully, prime minister to Henry the Great : containing the history of the life and reign of that monarch, and his own administration under him (1778)
- John Richardson, Theoretic Hints on an Improved Practice of Brewing Malt Liquors: Including some Strictures on the Nature and Properties of Water, Malt, and Hops (1777)
- The New Annual Register (yearly from 1781)
- Anna Seward, Poem to the Memory of Lady Miller (1782)
- Wyndham Beawes Lex Mercatoria rediviva, or, The merchant's directory : being a complete guide to all men in business, whether as traders, remitters, owners, freighters, captains, insurers, brokers, factors, supercargoes, agents, containing an account of our mercantile companies; of our colonies and factories abroad; of our commercial treaties with foreign powers; of the duty of consuls, and of the laws concerning aliens, naturalization, and denization (1783)
- George Berkeley, The Works of George Berkeley, D.D. Late Bishop of Cloyne in Ireland. To which is added, an account of his life, and several of his letters to Thomas Prior, Esq. Dean Gervais, and Mr. Pope, &c. &c. (1784, in two volumes)
- John Ferdinand Smyth, A Tour of the United States of America (1784)
- Robert Beatson, A Political Index to the Histories of Great Britain and Ireland; or, A complete register of the hereditary honours, public offices, and persons in office, from the earliest periods to the present time (1786)
- Gregory Griffin, The Microcosm, a periodical work (1787)
- Louis de Chénier, The Present State of the Empire of Morocco: its animals, products, climate, soil, cities, ports, provinces, coins, weights, and measures. With the language, religion, laws, manners, customs, and character, of the Moors (1788)
- Jane Timbury, A Sequel to the Philanthropic Rambler (London: G.G.J. & J. Robinson, R. Faulder, J. Southern, 1791)
- John Rannie, Poems. 2nd Ed.(1791)
- Charlotte Smith, Desmond (3 vols., 1792)
- Ann Radcliffe, The Mysteries of Udolpho (4 vols., 1794)
- Ann Radcliffe, A Journey Made in the Summer of 1794 (1795)
- Eliza Hamilton, Translation of the letters of a Hindoo rajah (1796)
- William Godwin, The Enquirer: reflections on education, manners, and literature (1797)
- Helen Maria Williams, A tour in Switzerland, or, A view of the present state of the governments and manners of those cantons : with comparative sketches of the present state of Paris (1798)
- Thomas Bewick, A History of British Birds (Newcastle: Beilby and Bewick; London: G. G. & J. Robinson; vol. 1, 1797, vol. 2, 1804)
