= William Page Roberts =

English clergyman (1836-1928)

William Page Roberts (2 January 1836 – 17 August 1928) was an eminent English clergyman in the Church of England and Dean of Salisbury from 1907 until 1919.

Born at Liverpool to William Roberts and his wife Prudence (née Page), he was educated at Liverpool College and St John's College, Cambridge. Ordained in 1862, his first post was a curacy in Stockport. He then held incumbencies at Eye and St Peter's, Vere Street, London. Later he was a Canon Residentiary at Canterbury Cathedral before his elevation to the Deanery. A much respected cleric, he died at Shanklin, Isle of Wight, on 17 August 1928.

== Notes ==
Church of England titles
Preceded by Alan Becher Webb	Dean of Salisbury; 1907 –1919	Succeeded by Andrew Ewbank Burn
