= Hugh Dickinson =

English clergyman (1929–2025)

The Hon. Hugh Geoffrey Dickinson (17 November 1929 – 30 July 2025) was an English clergyman who was Dean of Salisbury from 1986 until his retirement in 1996.

== Biography ==
Dickinson was a younger son of Richard Sebastian Willoughby Dickinson DSO, only son of Willoughby Dickinson, 1st Baron Dickinson. His father was an officer of the Colonial Service, and his mother, Nancy Lovemore, was a sculptor. He and his middle brother Peter Dickinson were born in Northern Rhodesia. The family returned to England in 1934, and his father died the next year. He was educated at Westminster School and Trinity College, Oxford, and in May 1944 was granted the rank of a baron's younger son.

Dickinson was ordained in the Church of England in 1957, after a period of study at Ripon College Cuddesdon. He was a curate at St Michael's, Melksham, then chaplain at Trinity College, Cambridge, and at Winchester College. In 1969 he became Bishop Bardsley's Adviser for Adult Education in the Diocese of Coventry and was subsequently vicar of St Michael's, St Albans, from 1977 until 1986, when he was appointed Dean of Salisbury. In that role he was involved in the foundation of Sarum College in 1995. He retired in 1996, and later served as an assistant priest at St John the Baptist, Cirencester.

Dickinson married Jean Storey in June 1963 and they had two children: Teresa (born 1964) and Benjamin (born 1966). He died on 30 July 2025, at the age of 95.

Church of England titles
Preceded by Sydney Hall Evans	Dean of Salisbury; 1986–1996	Succeeded by Derek Watson
