= Archdeacon of Maidstone =

Church of England ecclesiastical office

The Archdeacon of Maidstone is an office-holder in the Diocese of Canterbury (one of the dioceses of the Province of Canterbury in the Church of England). The Archdeacon of Maidstone is an Anglican priest who oversees the Archdeaconry of Maidstone, which is one of three subdivisions of the diocese.

The archdeaconry was created from the ancient Archdeaconry of Canterbury by Order in Council on 4 June 1841.

== Composition ==
The archdeaconry covers approximately the north-west and south-west corners of the diocese. As of 2012, the archdeaconry of Maidstone consists the following deaneries in the Diocese of Canterbury:

- Deanery of Maidstone
- Deanery of North Downs
- Deanery of Ospringe
- Deanery of Sittingbourne
- Deanery of the Weald

== List of archdeacons ==
- 4 June 1841 – 1845 (res.): William Lyall
- 4 December 1845 – 25 March 1887 (d.): Benjamin Harrison
- 1887–26 March 1900 (d.): Benjamin Smith
- 1900–1921 (ret.): Henry Spooner
- 1921–1934 (res.): John Macmillan (also Bishop suffragan of Dover from 1927)
- 1934–1939 (res.): Karl Sopwith
- 1939–1942 (res.): Alexander Sargent
- 1942–1958 (ret.): Julian Bickersteth
- 1959–1965 (res.): Gordon Strutt
- 1965–1968 (res.): Michael Nott
- 1968–1972 (res.): Thomas Prichard
- 1972–1979 (ret.): Niel Nye (later archdeacon emeritus)
- 1979–1989 (res.): Michael Percival Smith
- 1989–2002 (res.): Patrick Evans
- 2002–13 March 2011 (res.): Philip Down
- 18 September 2011 – 27 September 2020 (res.): Stephen Taylor (on leave 2019–2020; became an Archdeacon without territory and Senior Chaplain to the Bishop of Dover, 2020–2022; Diocesan Secretary 2022–2024, acting since 2021)
- 27 September 2020 – 18 February 2025 (ret.): Andrew Sewell (previously Acting, 30 November 2019 – 31 May 2020)

Andrew William Sewell. Born in 1961, Sewell was educated at the University of Nottingham, and St John’s College, Nottingham. He was ordained deacon in 1993, and priest in 1994. He served in parishes in the Diocese of Ripon and Leeds until 1998 when he was appointed Priest in Charge of Otham with Langley in Kent, becoming the Rector in 2001. He was Vicar of St Paul’s Maidstone from 2010 to 2020 and an Honorary Canon of Canterbury Cathedral from 2011. Sewell retired effective 18 January 2025.

== Sources ==
- Horn, Joyce M. (1974), Fasti Ecclesiae Anglicanae 1541–1857, vol. 3, p. 17
