= James Croft (priest) =

James Croft (2 July 1784 – 9 May 1869) was Archdeacon of Canterbury from 18 June 1825 until his death.

The son of Robert Croft, Canon of York, he was educated at Peterhouse, Cambridge. Croft was ordained in 1810 and held incumbencies at Ingoldmells, Saltwood, Great Chart and Cliffe-at-Hoo.

Church of England titles
Preceded by Hugh Percy	Archdeacon of Canterbury; 1825 - 1869	Succeeded by Edward Parry
