= Derek Watson (priest) =

Derek Watson served as the dean of Salisbury in the Church of England from 1996 to his retirement in 2002.

Born on 18 February 1938 and educated at Uppingham School and Selwyn College, Cambridge, he was ordained into the priesthood in 1965 after a period of study at Ripon College Cuddesdon. His first post was as a Curate at All Saints, New Eltham, after which he was Chaplain of Christ's College, Cambridge. He was then Domestic Chaplain to the Bishop of Southwark and then, in March 1977, the first Vicar of the reunited benefice of St Andrew's and St Mark's, Surbiton. Promotion to be Canon Treasurer of Southwark Cathedral followed and, after a spell as Rector of St Luke's and Christ Church, Chelsea, he was elevated to the Deanery. He is now Preacher of Lincoln's Inn.

== Personal life ==
He is married to Sheila Watson (née Atkinson). She is also a Church of England priest and the current Archdeacon of Canterbury. They are both keen cyclists.

Church of England titles
Preceded by Hugh Geoffrey Dickinson	Dean of Salisbury; 1996–2004	Succeeded by June Osborne
