= James E. Croft =

- Born: November 13, 1833; England
- Died: May 26, 1914 (aged 80)
- Military career
- Allegiance: United States of America; Union
- Branch: United States Army; Union Army
- Service years: 1862 - 1865
- Rank: Corporal
- Unit: 12th Independent Battery, Wisconsin Volunteer Light Artillery
- Conflicts: American Civil War: Battle of Allatoona
- Awards: Medal of Honor

James E. Croft (November 13, 1833 – May 26, 1914) was a soldier in the Union Army during the American Civil War who received the Medal of Honor for his actions during the Battle of Allatoona.

Croft was born in England November 13, 1833. He joined the 12th Wisconsin Light Artillery Battery from Janesville, Wisconsin in August 1862, and mustered out in June 1865.

== Medal of Honor citation ==
Citation:

For extraordinary heroism on 5 October 1864, while serving with Battery 12, Wisconsin Light Artillery, in action at Allatoona, Georgia. Private Croft took the place of a gunner who had been shot down and inspired his comrades by his bravery and effective gunnery, which contributed largely to the defeat of the enemy.

== See also ==
- List of Medal of Honor recipients
- List of American Civil War Medal of Honor recipients: A–F
