= Henry Spooner (priest) =

Henry Maxwell Spooner was the Archdeacon of Maidstone from 1900 until 1921.

Spooner's grandfather, William, was Archdeacon of Coventry from 1821 to 1851; and his father, also William Spooner, a county court judge for North Staffordshire.

== Life ==
Spooner was educated at Oswestry School and Balliol College, Oxford, graduating in 1868. He was a Fellow of Magdalen College, Oxford 1868–1876. He was ordained deacon in 1870; and priest in 1871. He was domestic chaplain to the Archbishop of Canterbury from 1870 to 1875. In 1875 year he married Catherine, the second daughter of Harvey Goodwin, the Bishop of Carlisle and became vicar of Boughton under Blean. In 1887 he became the incumbent at Holy Trinity, Maidstone; and in 1893 rector of Saltwood. He became a canon residentiary of Canterbury Cathedral in 1900, the year he became archdeacon.

He died on 1 April 1929.

Church of England titles
| Preceded by Benjamin Smith | Archdeacon of Maidstone; 1900–1921 | Succeeded by John Macmillan |
