= James Crofts (British Army officer) =

British army officer (c. 1683–1732)

James Crofts (c. 1683–1732) was an officer of the British Army. He was the illegitimate son of James Scott, 1st Duke of Monmouth, and a grandson of Charles II of England.

== Biography ==
Born about 1683, Crofts was the natural son of James Scott, 1st Duke of Monmouth, by his mistress Eleanor Needham, a daughter of Sir Robert Needham. Monmouth was the illegitimate son of Charles II of England. His father led the failed Monmouth Rebellion of 1685 against his uncle, James II of England, and was beheaded in July of that year. The surname Crofts had previously been used by his father.

Crofts entered the Army in the early part of the reign of his first cousin once removed, Queen Anne, rose to the rank of colonel by 1706, and in 1718 succeeded Sir Robert Rich in the command of a regiment of dragoons, which was disbanded later the same year. On 6 July 1719 he obtained the colonelcy of the regiment of dragoons later known as the 9th Queen's Royal Lancers, and in 1727 he was promoted to the rank of major-general. He died at his house in Downing Street, London, in March 1732.

== Descendants ==
Allan Fea states that Crofts married a daughter of Sir Thomas Taylor (“after 1706, when he is described as single”) and had a daughter, Maria Julia; and that she married first a Mr Dalziel and secondly R. Wentworth Smyth-Stuart, who claimed to be Monmouth’s son by Henrietta Maria Wentworth. John Ferdinand Smyth Stuart claimed to be the son of this marriage, but many of his claims have been challenged by Anthony J. Camp.

In another theory, James Crofts and his mistress Grace Camfield had a daughter who married Gibson Dalziel and was the mother of Maria Julia Dalziel, who then married Colonel Charles Smyth, the son of Monmouth and Lady Wentworth. However, the mother of Gibson Dalziel’s lawful children was an illegitimate daughter of John Augier.

Military offices
Preceded by Sir Robert Rich	Colonel of Crofts' Regiment of Dragoons; 1718	Succeeded by Regiment disbanded
Preceded by Owen Wynne	Colonel of Crofts' Regiment of Dragoons; 1719–1732	Succeeded by The Viscount Molesworth
