= Archdeacon of Ashford =

Church of England ecclesiastical office

The Archdeacon of Ashford is a senior office-holder in the English Diocese of Canterbury (a division of the Church of England Province of Canterbury). The Archdeacon of Ashford is an Anglican priest that oversees the Archdeaconry of Ashford, which is one of three subdivisions of the diocese. The first incumbent was Philip Down, who was collated Archdeacon of Ashford on 13 March 2011 and who retired effective 15 October 2017. The second and current archdeacon is Darren Miller, who was collated on 13 January 2018.

== History ==
The archdeaconry was created under the Pastoral Measure 1983, by Trevor Willmott, Bishop of Dover (exercising the functions of diocesan bishop delegated by the Archbishop of Canterbury) on 1 February 2011. At the same time, it was decided that Down (then Archdeacon of Maidstone) would transfer to the newly created role.

== Composition ==
The archdeaconry covers a central and eastern portion the diocese. As of 2012, the archdeaconry of Ashford consists the following deaneries in the Diocese of Canterbury:

- Deanery of Ashford
- Deanery of Dover
- Deanery of Elham
- Deanery of Romney and Tenterden
- Deanery of Sandwich
