= Allan Fea =

British historian

Portrait by Walter Stoneman, c. 1916

Allan Fea (25 May 1860 – 9 June 1956), was a British historian, specializing in the English Civil Wars period and the House of Stuart, and an antiquary, after a first career as a clerk at the Bank of England.

== Life ==
Fea was born at St Pancras, London, in 1860, the son of William and Marie Fea, of Kentish Town, where his father was a book-keeper. He was baptized into the Church of England at St John the Baptist’s Church, Kentish Town, at the age of five weeks.

Fea’s first career was in the Bank of England. In 1893, he married Louisa Hallmark at St Pancras. They had no children. A nephew named after Fea, Allan William Francis Fea, died in 1894. In 1901, aged 40, he was living in Newnham, Kent, and was a retired bank clerk. In 1911, he was living at South Lodge, Pinner, with his wife and one servant, calling himself a retired bank clerk and author. His wife died in Kent in 1942.

Fea’s interest in priest holes and hiding places was partly prompted by visiting Sharsted Court, near his home in Newnham.

After a prolific second career as a writer of historical books, Fea died in Whitstable, Kent in 1956, aged 96. Probate was granted to his nephew Cyril Alfred Fea, a bank official.

The National Portrait Gallery has a portrait photograph of Fea by Walter Stoneman dated 1916.

== Selected works ==
- The Flight of the King; being a full, true, and particular account of the miraculous escape of His Most Sacred Majesty King Charles II after the battle of Worcester (London, New York, J. Lane, 1897)
- Secret Chambers and Hiding-places; historic, romantic & legendary stories & traditions about hiding-holes, secret chambers, etc. (London, S. H. Bousfield & Co., 1901)
- King Monmouth, being a history of the career of James Scott "The Protestant duke" 1649–1685 (London, New York, J. Lane, 1902)
- Picturesque old houses; being the impressions of a wanderer off the beaten track (London, S. H. Bousfield & Co. 1902)
- After Worcester Fight (London & New York : J. Lane, 1904)
- Memoirs of the Martyr King, being a detailed record of the last two years of the reign of His Most Sacred Majesty King Charles the First (1646-1648/9) (London & New York, John Lane, 1905)
- Memoirs of Lady Fanshawe, Wife of Sir Richard Fanshawe, bt., embassador from Charles II. to the courts of Portugal & Madrid, written by herself: containing extracts from the correspondence of Sir Richard Fanshawe ed. (London New York, J. Lane, 1905)
- J. Seymour Lucas, Royal Academician (London, Virtue & Co., 1908)
- James II and his wives (London, Methuen and Co., 1908)
- Nooks and Corners of old England (New York, C. Scribner's Sons, 1907; London, Martin Secker, 1911)
- Old English Houses, the record of a random itinerary (New York, Charles Scribner's sons, 1910; London, M. Secker, 1910)
- Old World places (London, E. Nash, 1912)
- Quiet Roads and Sleepy Villages (London : E. Nash, 1913; New York, McBride, Nash, 1914)
- The Real Captain Cleveland (London, M. Secker, 1912)
- Some Beauties of the seventeenth century (London, Methuen & co., 1906)
- Where Traditions linger: being rambles through remote England (Philadelphia : Lippincott, 1924)
