= Karl Sopwith =

The Ven Thomas Karl Sopwith MA (known as Karl; 28 May 1873 – 14 December 1945) was an eminent Anglican clergyman in the first half of the 20th century.

He was born on 28 May 1873, the eldest son of Arthur Sopwith of Chasetown & his wife Catherine Susan née Shelford. He was educated at Emmanuel College, Cambridge, graduating BA with a first-class in the Theology tripos in 1895. Ordained in 1897, after curacies at St Matthew's, Walsall and St Peter's, Cranley Gardens he held incumbencies in Shoreham, Kent, Westminster, Aylesford and Ashford, Kent. In 1934 he was appointed Archdeacon of Maidstone, and in 1939 Archdeacon of Canterbury. He retired in 1942 and died on 14 December 1945.

== Notes ==
Church of England titles
| Preceded by Edward Hoare Hardcastle | Archdeacon of Canterbury; 1939 –- 1942 | Succeeded by Alexander Sargent |
