= Dean of Salisbury =

Position at Salisbury Cathedral

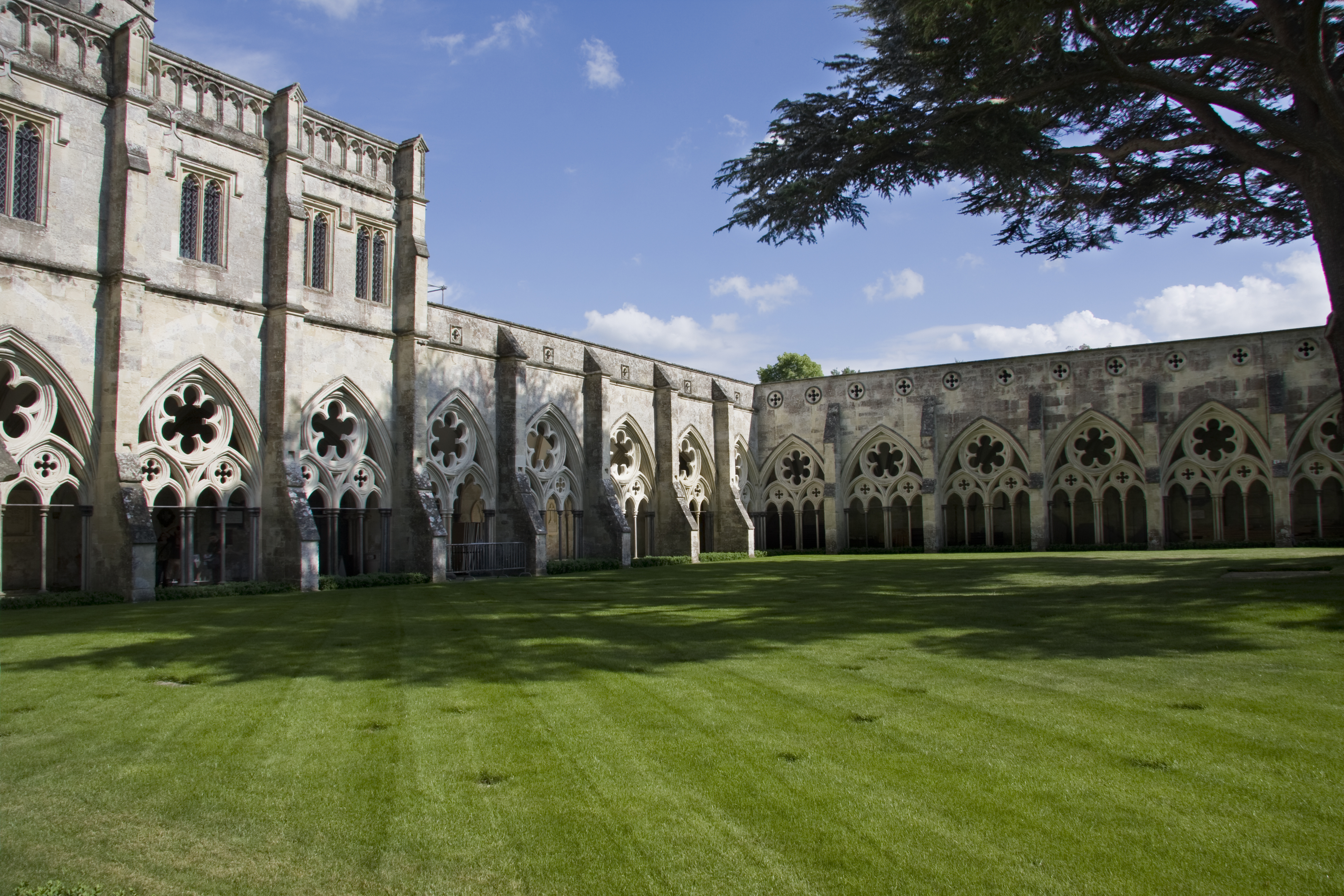
The cloisters at Salisbury Cathedral

The dean of Salisbury is the head of the chapter of Salisbury Cathedral in the Church of England. The dean assists the archdeacon of Sarum and bishop of Ramsbury in the diocese of Salisbury.

== List of deans ==
=== High Medieval ===
- c. 1102 Walter
- c. 1105 Osbert
- ?–1111 Robert
- bef. 1115–aft. 1122 Serlo
- c. 1131 Roger
- c. 1139–aft. 1145 Azo
- 1148–1155 Robert of Chichester
- 1155–1164 Henry de Beaumont
- 1166–1175 John of Oxford
- 1176–1193 Jordan
- 1194–1197 Eustace
- 1197–1215 Richard Poore
- 1215–1220 Adam
- 1220–1236 William de Wanda
- 1238–1257 Robert de Hertford
- 1258–1271 Robert Wickhampton
- 1271–1284 Walter Scammel
- 1285–1287 Henry Brandeston
- 1287–1295 Simon de Micham

=== Late Medieval ===
- 1297–1309 Peter of Savoy
- 1308–1311 William Rufati
- 1311–1346 Reymund de Fargis
- 1346–1347 Bertrand de Fargis
- 1347–1374 Reynold Orsini
- 1374–13 August 1379 (d.): Giacomo Cardinal Orsini

(cardinal-deacon of San Giorgio in Velabro; also
Archdeacon of Leicester and Archdeacon of Durham)

- 1380–1381 Robert Braybrooke
- 1382–1404 Thomas Montagu
- 1404–1417 John Chandler
- 1418–1431 Simon Sydenham
- 1431–1435 Thomas Brunce
- 1435–1441 Nicholas Bildeston
- 1441–1446 Adam Moleyns
- 1446–1449 Richard Leyot
- 1449–1463 Gilbert Kymer
- 1463–1472 James Goldwell
- 1473–1485 John Davison
- 1486–1502 Edward Cheyne

=== Early modern ===
- 1502–1509 Thomas Ruthall
- 1509–1514 William Atwater
- 1514–1521 John Longland
- 1521–1522 Cuthbert Tunstall
- 1523–1536 Richard Pace
- 1536–1563 Peter Vannes
- 1563–1571 William Bradbridge
- 1571 Thomas Cole (nominated)
- 1571–1572 Edmund Freke
- 1572–1577 John Piers
- 1577–1604 John Bridges
- 1604–1619 John Gordon
- 1619–1620 John Williams
- 1620–1630 John Bowle
- 1630–1635 Edmund Mason
- 1635–1667 Richard Baylie
- 1667–1675 Ralph Brideoake
- 1675–1691 Thomas Pierce
- 1691–1702 Robert Woodward
- 1702–1705 Edward Young
- 1705–1728 John Younger
- 1728–1757 John Clarke
- 1757–1780 Thomas Greene
- 1780–1786 Rowney Noel
- 1786–1808 John Ekins

=== Late modern ===
- 1809–1823 Charles Talbot
- 1823–1846 Hugh Pearson
- 1846–1850 Francis Lear
- 1850–1880 Henry Hamilton
- 1880–1880 J. C. Ryle
- 1880–1901 George Boyle
- 1901–1907 Allan Webb
- 1907–1919 William Page Roberts
- 1920–1927 Andrew Burn
- 1928–1935 John Randolph
- 1936–1943 Edward Henderson
- 1943–1952 Henry Charles Robins
- 1952–1960 Robert Moberly
- 1960–1971 Kenneth Haworth
- 1971–1977 Fenton Morley
- 1977–1986 Sydney Hall Evans
- 1986–1996 The Hon Hugh Dickinson
- 1996–2004 Derek Watson
- 2004–2017 June Osborne
- 2017–2018 Ed Probert (Acting)
- 9 September 2018 – present Nick Papadopulos

== Sources ==
- Fasti Ecclesiae Anglicanae 1066–1300, vol. 4, 1991, pp. 7–12
