= Reginbald =

Reginbald (also Reginbold, Regimbald or Regenbald) may refer to:

- Reginbald I (bishop of Speyer) (r. 946–950)
- Reginbald II (bishop of Speyer) (r. 1032–1039)
- Regenbald, chancellor of England (fl. 1050–1086)
- Reginbold of Isenburg (fl. 1088–1117)
