= Raimbaud =

Raimbaud was an Italo-Norman chief who served under Philaretus Brachamius from 1073 to 1074. He arrived in the East at the head of 8,000 Norman mercenaries who took up service with Philaretus in 1073. They were headquartered at the castle of Afranji, which means "Franks," near Harput on the Euphrates. Some of the Normans were at Edessa, Philaretus' capital, and at Antioch, where Italian traders from Amalfi and Bari continued to find access to Eastern goods despite the troubled times in the region, with the recent coming of the Seljuk horde. Raimbaud himself did not lead his troops long. He died in battle defending Philaretus' tent from Thornig, Prince of Sassoun.

== Sources ==
- Gravett, Christopher, and Nicolle, David. The Normans: Warrior Knights and their Castles. Osprey Publishing: Oxford, 2006.
