= Regenbald =

11th-century Anglo-Saxon royal official and priest

- Royal chaplain and clerk

Personal details
- Buried: Possibly Cirencester
- Children: Edward

Regenbald (sometimes known as Regenbald of Cirencester) was a priest and royal official in Anglo–Saxon England under King Edward the Confessor. His name suggests that he was not a native Englishman, and perhaps he was German or Norman. He first appears in history as a witness to a royal document in 1050, and remained a royal chaplain and clerk throughout the rest of King Edward's reign. Many royal documents give Regenbald the title of "chancellor"; but whether this means that he acted in a manner similar to the later Lord Chancellors is unclear, as some of the documents may be forgeries or have been tampered with. Whatever Regenbald's actual title, King Edward rewarded him with lands and also granted him the status, but not the actual office, of bishop. Regenbald continued to serve the English kings after the Norman Conquest of England, although whether he served King Harold II of England is unclear. His date of death is unknown, but it was probably during the reign of either King William I or King William II. After his death, some of his lands became part of the endowment of Cirencester Abbey in 1133.

== Early life ==
Regenbald's origins are unknown, but he was probably not a native Englishman. He may have been German or Norman. The historian Katharine Keats-Rohan suggests that he was possibly the nephew of Peter, who was the Bishop of Chester and a Norman. His name was a German or French name, which suggests that Regenbald was one of the foreigners who gained favour with King Edward the Confessor.

== Service to Edward the Confessor ==
Regenbald first appears in the historical record in 1050, when he witnesses a charter of King Edward. King Edward gave him large estates as a reward for his service to the king as a royal chaplain. The Domesday Book of 1086 records him owning at least seven churches, but only two of them have any indication that he performed any ecclesiastical services personally. Another royal reward was the grant to Regenbald of the status, without the actual office, of a bishop. He probably was unable to be promoted to a bishopric, either because he was married or because his style of life was known to be unchaste.

In royal charters Regenbald is often given the title "royal chancellor", as he is styled in a 1062 charter in Latin regis cancellarius, but this does not necessarily mean that there was an official office known as chancellor similar to the later Lord Chancellor's office. Regenbald was probably in charge of Edward's royal clerks and scribes, but his position in the witness lists argues against his holding an actual office, as he is not listed early in the witness lists along with the magnates. He probably performed some of the duties that later were done by the chancellor, but the first chancellor in England is usually held to be Herfast, who held office from around 1069. Some historians, including David Bates, hold that Regenbald was chancellor, however. Some support for that position is the fact that Domesday Book lists Regenbald as "chancellor". The entire issue of whether Regenbald was a "true" chancellor or not is bound up in the debate amongst medievalists about whether there was a recognisable chancery in England prior to the Norman Conquest. One school of thought, led by Pierre Chaplais, argues that no such office existed prior to the Conquest. Another group argues that there was, and among this group is the historian Simon Keynes. In Regenbald's case, a number of the documents that give him the title "chancellor" either are forgeries or have been altered in the copying process. Others, however, are not easily shown to be spurious.

Besides his scribal duties, Regenbald also served as a royal judge, as he is recorded as passing judgement in a case late in Edward's or early in William's reign, along with Wulfstan, Bishop of Worcester, and Æthelwig, Abbot of Evesham. A thirteenth-century source says that he was dean of the church at Cirencester during William's reign.

Regenbald remained at the royal court throughout Edward's reign and into the reign of King William the Conqueror. His lands and possessions were confirmed by King William after the Norman Conquest. Whether he served King Harold in the period after King Edward's death is unknown, as no royal charters and only one royal writ survive from Harold's reign.

Regenbald's lands are recorded in a charter from the reign of King Henry I of England which dealt with the gift of those lands after Regenbald's death. This charter lists a number of estates as owned by Regenbald that were also listed in Domesday Book as Regenbald's, but there are a few other possessions that did not get recorded in Domesday. The lands listed include lands in Gloucestershire, Berkshire, Wiltshire, Somerset, Northamptonshire, Worcestershire, and Dorset. Domesday lists the value of Regenbald's lands at £40 per year. His estates totalled about 90 hides, although some of the estates were given to him after the Norman Conquest.

== Death and legacy ==
Presumably, Regenbald died either during the reign of William I or during the following reign of William II. Possibly, he was buried at Cirencester, where a stone tomb in the crypt of the Saxon-era church still exists and may be his. After his death, a group of his lands became the basis for the foundation of Cirencester Abbey by King Henry I of England in 1133. Regenbald's brother held land near him in Cirencester. Regenbald had a son named Edward who also held lands in Gloucester.
