= Michel Ephrussi =

French banker (1844–1914)

- Born: May 10, 1844; Odessa, Russian Empire
- Died: January 5, 1914 (aged 69); Paris, France
- Occupations: Banker, investor, racehorse owner/breeder
- Board member of: Banque Ephrussi
- Spouse: Amélie Wilhelmine Liliane Beer (Baer) (1850-1914)
- Children: Louise Nadine (1873–1888); Louis Alexandre (1878–1880); Marie Juliette (1880–1964)
- Parents: Charles Joachim Ephrussi (1792–1864) (father); Henriette Halperson (1822–1888) (mother)
- Relatives: Siblings: Léon, Ignaz, Maurice, Thérèse, Marie

Michel Ephrussi (May 10, 1844 – January 5, 1914) was a Russian-born French banker who also bred and raced Thoroughbreds.

== Early life ==
Michel Ephrussi was born on May 10, 1844, in Odessa, Russian Empire. He was a member of the Ephrussi family. His father, Charles Joachim Ephrussi, was a trader in wheat who founded a bank, Ephrussi & Co. His mother was Henriette Halperson. His elder half-brother, Ignace von Ephrussi, opened a branch of the Ephrussi & Co. bank in Vienna, Austria.

== Career ==
With his younger brother Maurice Ephrussi, Ephrussi opened a branch of Ephrussi & Co., the family bank in Paris, France.

Beyond banking, Michel Ephrussi had other investments including the Hôtel Pompadour at Fontainebleau and was an investor in Guapo Trinidad Oil Co. Ltd. A supporter of the fledgling aviation industry, Michel Ephrussi provided funding for a prize in his name at the 1910 Rheims Aviation Meeting.

== Thoroughbred racing ==
Michel Ephrussi and his brother Maurice were both involved in the sport of Thoroughbred horse racing. Michel notably owned Finasseur, winner of the 1905 Grand Prix de Paris, at the time France's most prestigious race. Other wins by Michel Ephrussi's horses include:

- Grand Prix de Bruxelles - (1) - Finasseur (1905)
- Grand Prix de Deauville - (3) - Polyeucte (1886), Naviculaire (1892) Biniou (1909)
- Grand Prix de Paris - (1) - Finasseur (1905)
- Prix du President de la Republique - (1) - Finasseur (1905)
- La Coupe de Maisons-Laffitte - (1) - Ben (1907)
- Poule d'Essai des Poulains - (2) - Gamin (1886) Beaujolais (1894)
- Poule d'Essai des Pouliches - (2) - Barberine (1885) Primrose (1891)
- Prix Chaudenay - (2) - Naviculaire (1891) et Fawn (1905)
- Prix du Rond Point - (2) - Précy (1883) Lézard (1909)
- Prix de Diane - (3) - Barberine (1885), Bavarde (1887) Primrose (1891)
- Prix des Chênes - (1) - Finasseur (1904)
- Prix du Jockey Club - (1) - Finasseur (1905)
- Prix du Prince d'Orange - (2) - Athos (1888) Biniou (1909)
- Prix Kergorlay - (2) - Brisolier (1887) Boissière (1893)
- Prix du Nabob - (2) - Gournay (1887), Primrose (1891)
- Prix Royal-Oak - (3) - Gamin (1886), Bavarde (1887) Pourtant (1889)

== Personal life ==
On December 23, 1872, in Paris, Michel Ephrussi married Belgian-born Amélie Wilhelmine Liliane Beer, a niece of composer Jacob Liebmann Beer. The couple had three children and made their home at 81 Rue de Monceau in the 8th arrondissement of Paris.

Michel Ephrussi was a close business associate of the Rothschilds in Paris, and his brother Maurice married Béatrice de Rothschild. In 1900, Michel Ephrussi became embroiled in a conflict over possibly anti-semitic remarks made by the Count Guy de Lubersac towards Robert de Rothschild. On April 4, 1900, Ephrussi and the Count fought a duel with swords on Île de la Jatte in the Seine River at Neuilly in which Ephrussi was wounded in the chest but soon recovered.

== Death ==
Ephrussi died on January 5, 1914.
