= Maurice Ephrussi =

French banker (1849–1916)

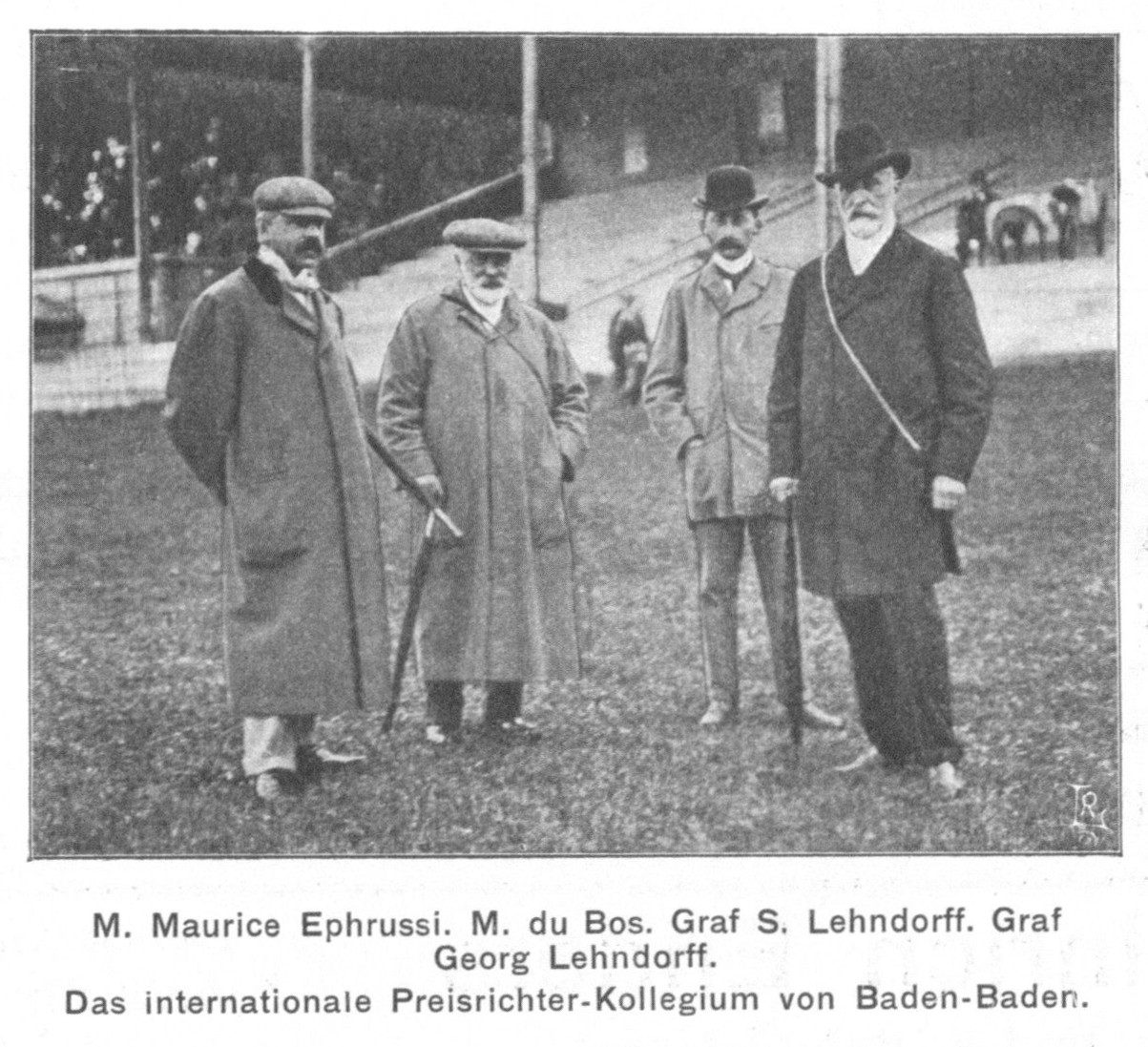
- Maurice Ephrussi (first from left) with M. du Bos, Siegfried Lehndorff and Georg von Lehndorff as members of a referee committee at a horse-racing track in Baden-Baden in 1902
- Born: 18 November 1849; Odessa, Russian Empire
- Died: 29 October 1916 (aged 66); Paris, France
- Occupations: Financier; racehorse owner/breeder
- Board member of: Banque Ephrussi
- Spouse: Béatrice de Rothschild
- Parents: Charles Joachim Ephrussi (father); Henriette Halperson (mother)
- Relatives: Ignaz (brother); Michel (brother)

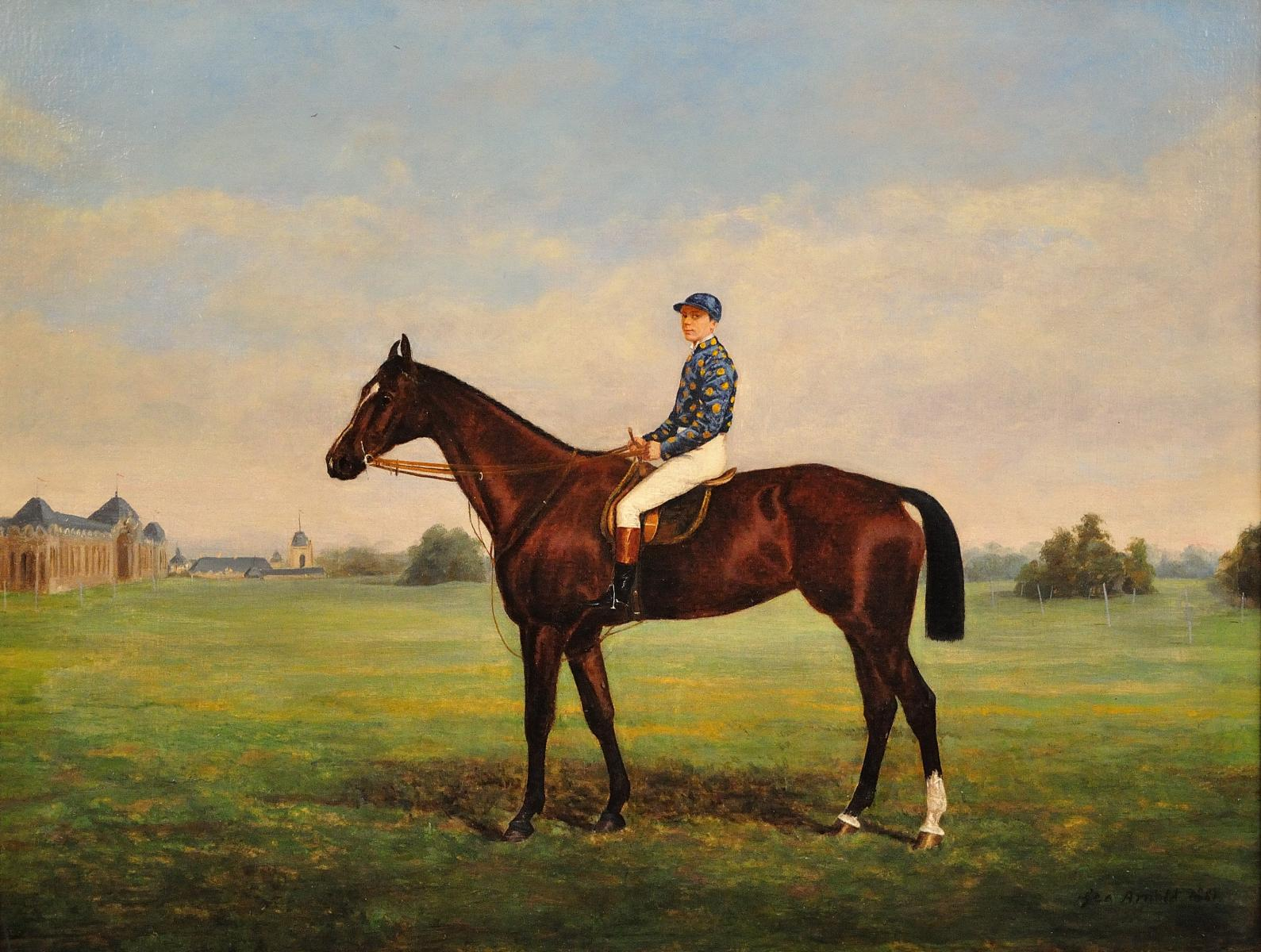
Maurice Ephrussi's Prix de Diane winner Serpolette II at Chantilly

Maurice Ephrussi (18 November 1849 – 29 October 1916) was a French banker and horsebreeder.

== Early life ==
Maurice Ephrussi was born on November 18, 1849, in Odessa, in the Russian Empire (present-day Ukraine). He was a member of the Ephrussi family. His father, Charles Joachim Ephrussi (1792–1864), was a trader in wheat who founded a bank, Ephrussi & Co., and his mother was Henriette Halperson (1822–1888). His elder half-brother, Ignace von Ephrussi, founded a branch of the family bank in Vienna, Austria.

== Career ==
With his older brother, Michel Ephrussi, Maurice co-founded a branch of Ephrussi & Co. in Paris, France.

=== Equestrian interests ===
Maurice Ephrussi and his brother Michel were both involved in the sport of Thoroughbred horse racing. Maurice owned Haras du Gazon, a breeding farm in Bazoches-au-Houlme, Orne, Normandy where he bred the outstanding runner and champion sire, Perth. Perth's sire was the Ephrussi stallion War Dance, who also sired the brilliant filly Roxelane.

In the 1860s, Maurice Ephrussi had acquired Château de Reux near Reux, Calvados, located about 90 kilometres (56 mi) northeast of Haras du Gazon.

Horses raced by Maurice Ephrussi won a number of important races in France and England, including the

- Cambridgeshire Handicap - (1) - Alicante (1907)
- La Coupe - (1) - Bariolet (1882)
- Prix de la Forêt - (2) - Seymour (1879) Alicante (1889)
- Prix du Cadran - (1) - Bariolet (1882)
- Prix du Jockey Club - (1) - Mordant (1907)
- Prix Gladiateur - (1) - Bariolet (1882)
- Prix du Nabob - (2) - Alicante (1890), Chapeau Chinois (1893)
- Prix Royal-Oak - (1) - Alicante (1890)
- Prix Jean Prat - (1) - Alicante (1891)

Haras du Gazon was later purchased by American horseman, Herman B. Duryea.

== Personal life ==
Ephrussi married Béatrice de Rothschild, the daughter of Alphonse de Rothschild, a member of the Rothschild banking family of France. The wedding took place on June 5, 1883, in Paris. They maintained a home in Paris, a villa in Monte Carlo called "Rose de France", and in the early 1900s, they built Villa Ephrussi de Rothschild at Saint-Jean-Cap-Ferrat.

The marriage quickly turned to disaster for Béatrice, as she caught syphilis from Maurice which prevented her from having children. Maurice was a big gambler and in 1904 his debts amounted to more than 12 million gold francs, the equivalent of 30 million euros today. Worried about the future, the Rothschild family decided to take Maurice to court to demand a separation. They won the case and, in June 1904, after 21 years of marriage, Béatrice de Rothschild and Maurice Ephrussi were separated.

Maurice and Béatrice Ephrussi were avid art collectors and his cousin, Charles Ephrussi, proprietor of the Gazette des Beaux-Arts in Paris, was a patron of the Impressionists.

Maurice Ephrussi died in 1916. Béatrice lived the rest of her life in Davos, where she died in 1934.
