= Ephrussi family =

Ashkenazi Jewish family

- Business family
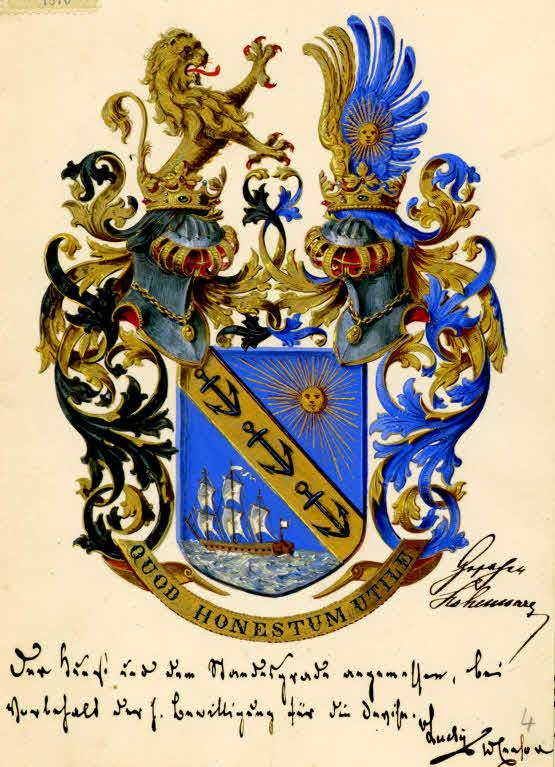
- Coat of arms granted to Ignace von Ephrussi in 1871
- Place of origin: Odessa, Russian Empire

The Ephrussi family (French pronunciation: [ɛfʁysi]) is a wealthy Ashkenazi Jewish noble banking family. The family's bank and properties were seized by the Nazi authorities after the 1938 "Anschluss", the annexation of Austria by Nazi Germany.

== History ==
The Ephrussi family progenitor was Charles Joachim Ephrussi (1792–1864) from Berdichev in the Russian Empire (present-day Ukraine). He made a fortune controlling grain distribution beginning in the free port of Odessa, and later controlled large-scale oil resources across Crimea and the Caucasus. By 1860, the family was the world's largest exporter of wheat.

Charles Joachim's eldest son, Leonid (d. 1877), founded a bank in Odessa, while his brother Ignaz (1829–1899) moved to the Austrian capital, Vienna, where he established the Ephrussi & Co. banking house in 1856. In 1872, he was elevated to the noble rank of Ritter by Habsburg emperor Franz Joseph I. In 1871, Leonid, together with his younger half-brothers Michel (1845–1914) and Maurice Ephrussi (1849–1916), founded a branch in Paris, followed by subsidiaries in London and Athens.

During the 19th century, the family possessed vast wealth and owned many castles, palaces, and estates in Europe. The family members were known for their connoisseurship, intellectual interests, and their huge collections of art. Leonid's son Charles Ephrussi (1849–1905), a well-known art historian, collector and editor, became a model for the character of Charles Swann in Marcel Proust's novel In Search of Lost Time.

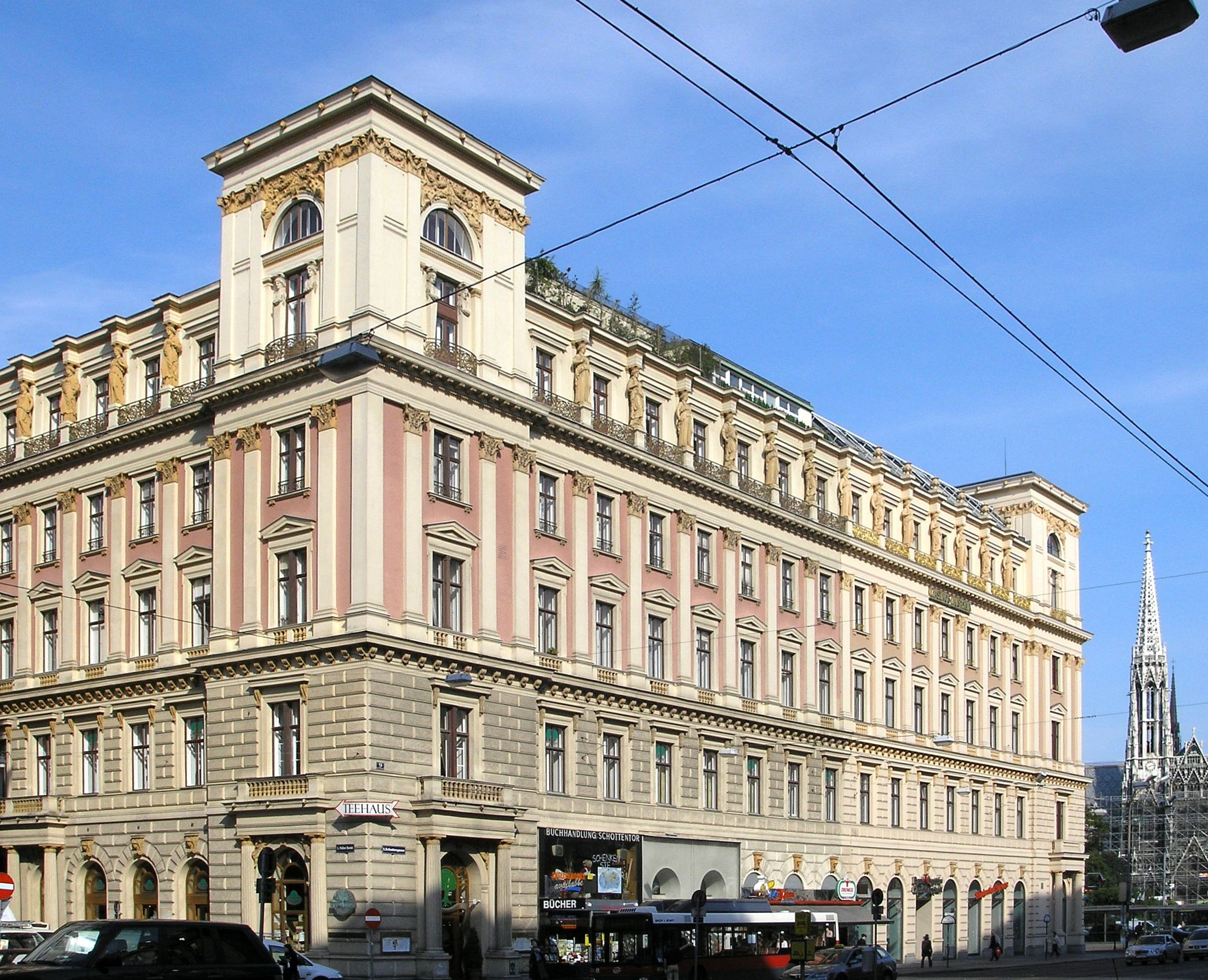
Palais Ephrussi on Vienna's Ringstraße (Universitätsring), opposite the Votivkirche, 2006

The family name is considered to be a variation of Ephrati, as a reference to "Ephraim" in 1 Samuel 1:1, a Hebrew family name attested in the 14th century in the Iberian Peninsula (modern Spain and Portugal) as Efrati and later in central Europe and Russia as Ephrati or Ephrussi.

== Notable members ==
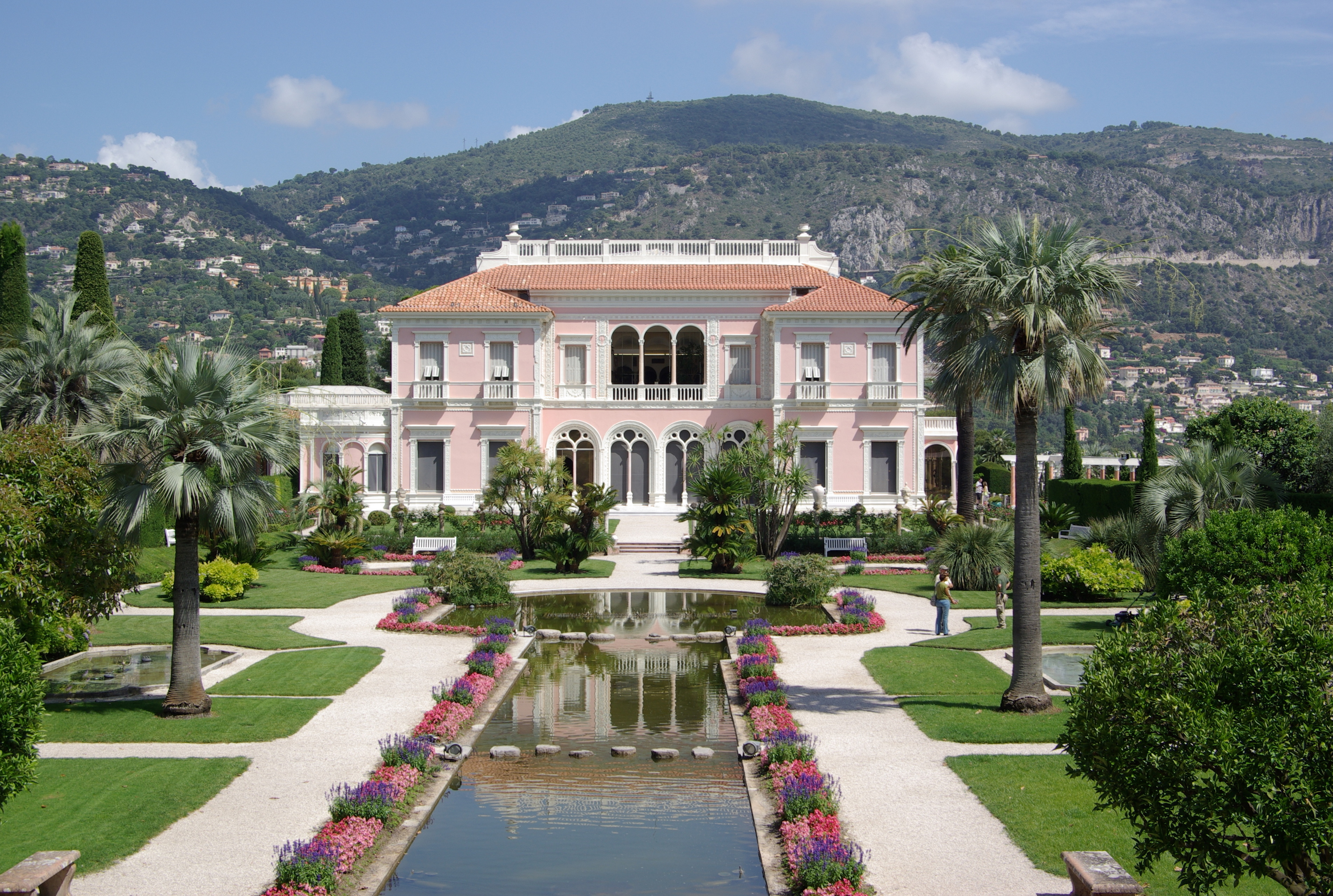
Villa Ephrussi on the French Riviera, 2011

Notable members of the Ephrussi family include:

- Ignace von Ephrussi (1829–1899), Austrian banker
- Michel Ephrussi (1845–1914), French banker
- Jules Ephrussi (1846–1915), French banker
- Charles Ephrussi (1849–1905), art historian, proprietor of the Gazette des Beaux-Arts, an inspiration for Charles Swann in Marcel Proust's À la recherche du temps perdu
- Maurice Ephrussi (1849–1916), French banker
- Viktor von Ephrussi (1860–1945), Austrian banker
- Béatrice Ephrussi de Rothschild (1864–1934), member of the Rothschild family and wife of Maurice Ephrussi
- Fanny Reinach (1870–1917)
- Marie Juliette (May) Ephrussi, Princesse de Faucigny-Lucinge (1880–1964)
- Elisabeth de Waal (1899–1991), née von Ephrussi, ancestor of the de Waal family members named below
- Gisela von Ephrussi (1904–1985), painter
- Ignace von Ephrussi (1906–1994)
- Rudolf von Ephrussi (1918–1971)
- Victor de Waal (born 1929), British Anglican priest, former Dean of Canterbury
- Constant Hendrik de Waal (1931–2016), became Sir Henry de Waal, First Parliamentary Counsel 1987–1991
- Hendrik de Waal (born 1955), real estate developer
- Anne Ephrussi (born 1955), group leader at EMBL since 1992, head of the Developmental Biology Unit since 2007
- John de Waal (born 1962), British barrister
- Alexander de Waal (born 1963), British writer and journalist, executive director of World Peace Foundation, founder of human rights organisations African Rights and Justice Africa, director of Social Science Research Council on AIDS New York
- Edmund de Waal (born 1964), British potter, author of The Hare with Amber Eyes
- Thomas de Waal (born 1966), British journalist (BBC, The Moscow Times and The Times), Caucasus expert, Caucasus editor at Institute for War and Peace Reporting, senior associate at Carnegie Endowment for International Peace

== Properties ==
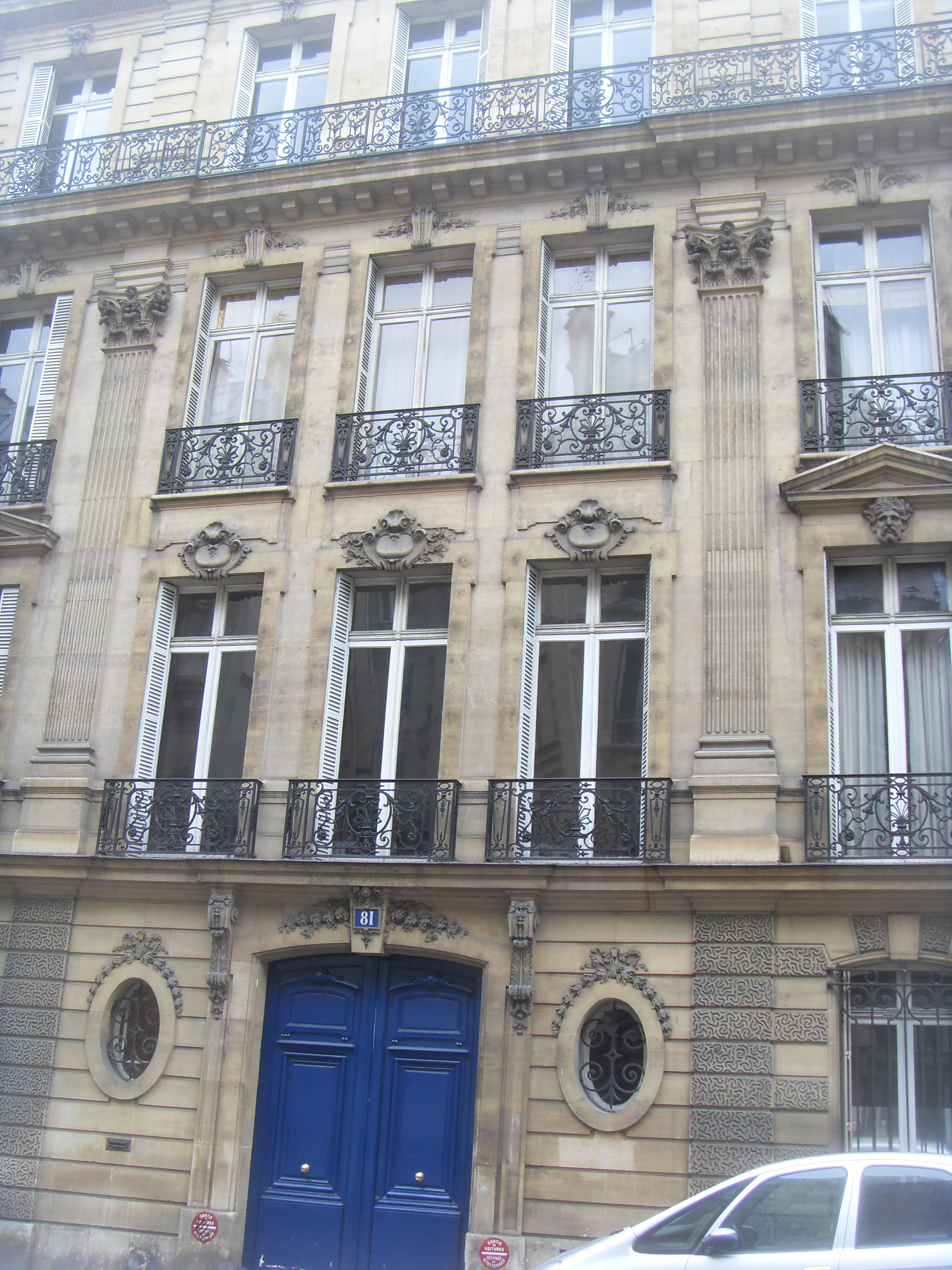
81 rue de Monceau, Paris

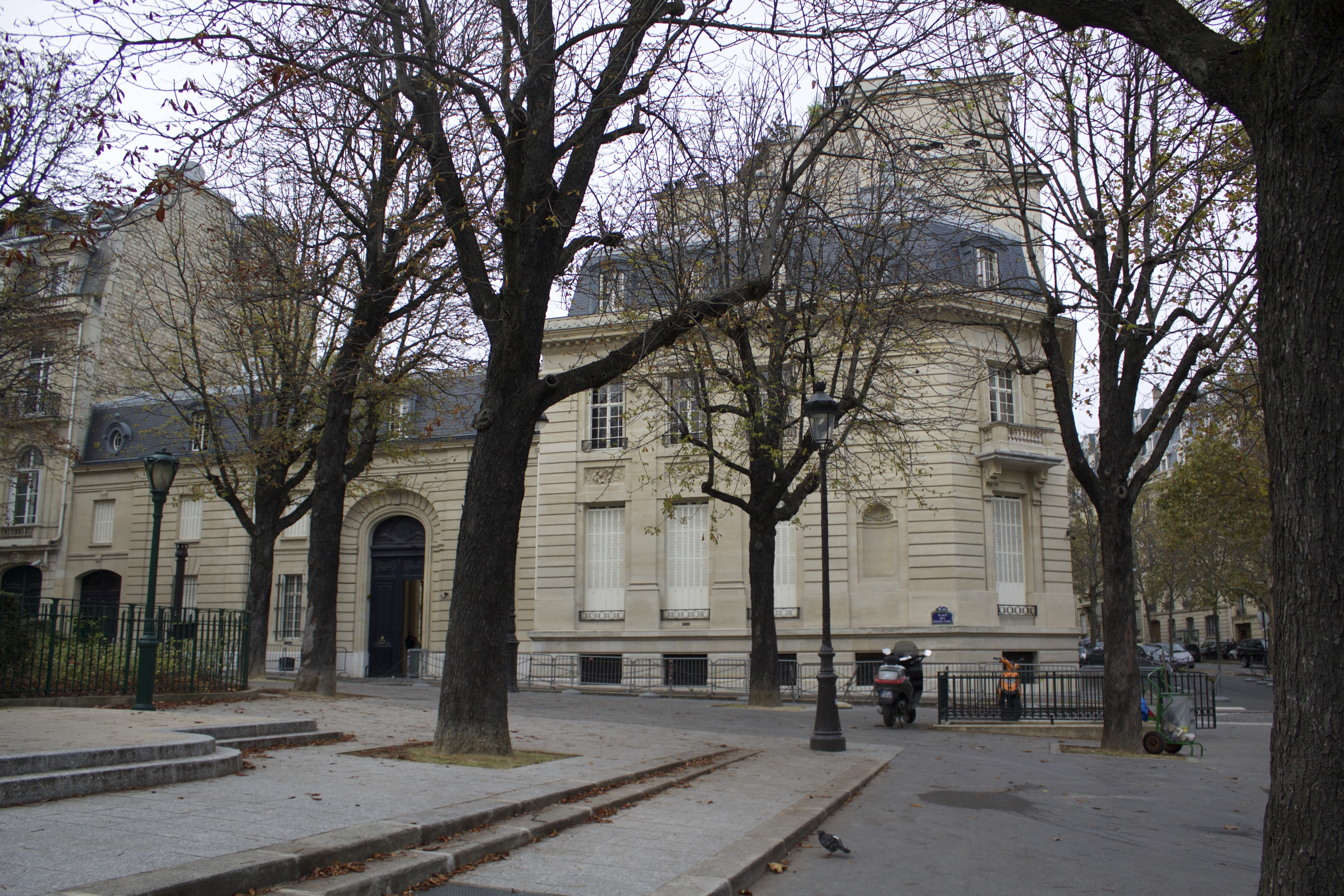
2 place des États-Unis, Paris

Notable properties of the family included:

- Palais Ephrussi, a Ringstraßenpalais in Vienna
- Hôtel de Breteuil, 12 avenue Foch, Paris (owned by May Ephrussi, Princesse de Faucigny-Lucinge, 1937–1954
- Hôtel Michel Ephrussi, 81 rue de Monceau, Paris (built for Michel Ephrussi, c. 1871)
- Hôtel Jules Ephrussi, 2 place des États-Unis, Paris (built for Jules Ephrussi, 1886)
- Hôtel Charles Ephrussi, 11 avenue d'Iéna, Paris (home of Charles Ephrussi; later demolished)
- Villa Ephrussi de Rothschild in Saint-Jean-Cap-Ferrat on the Côte d'Azur
- Villa Kerylos in Beaulieu-sur-Mer on the Côte d'Azur

== Other Ephrussi ==
Descendants of the Kishinev banker Joseph Ephrusi (Efrusi):

- Boris Ephrussi (1901–1979), Russo-French geneticist, Professor of Genetics at the University of Paris.
- Boris Ephrusi (1865, Kishinev – 1897, San Remo), Russian economist and journalist, member of the Russkoye Bogatstvo monthly magazine, brother of Perla Ephrussi and Zinaida Michnik (Ephrussi).
- Perla Ephrussi (also Paula and Polina Ephrussi, 1876, Kishinev – 1942, Pyatigorsk), Russian educational psychologist.
- Zinaida Michnik (Ephrussi) (1878, Kishinev – 1942, Pyatigorsk), Soviet pediatric researcher.
- Yakov Ephrussi (Russian: Яков Исаакович Эфрусси, 1900, Odessa – 1996, St. Petersburg), Soviet engineer, innovator in the field of television technology, nephew of Zinaida Ephrussi and Perla Ephrussi.

== The Hare with Amber Eyes ==
The Hare with Amber Eyes (2010) is a family memoir of the Ephrussi family by British potter Edmund de Waal, whose grandmother was Elisabeth Ephrussi.
