= Charles Ephrussi =

French art critic and historian (1849–1905)

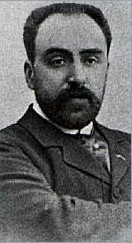
- Born: 24 December 1849; Odessa, Russian Empire
- Died: 30 September 1905 (aged 55); Paris, France
- Occupations: Art historian; critic

Charles Ephrussi (24 December 1849 – 30 September 1905) was a French art critic, art historian, and art collector. He also was a part-owner (from 1885) and then editor (from 1894) as well as a contributor to the Gazette des Beaux-Arts, the most important art historical periodical in France.

== Life ==
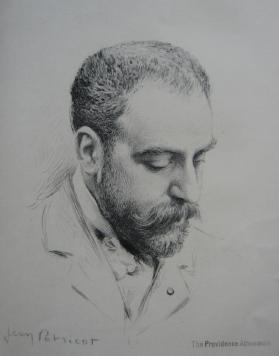
Charles Ephrussi, by Jean Patricot, 1905

A member of the wealthy Ephrussi family, he spent the first ten years of his life in Odessa, a major port on the Black Sea where his grandfather was a grain industrialist, before moving to Vienna. His father Léon and his uncle Ignace were in charge of establishing branches of the family business in Europe.

In 1871, Charles Ephrussi moved to the newly built Hôtel Ephrussi, 81 rue de Monceau, in Paris, with his parents and brothers. The next year, he traveled to Italy, where he began to collect art. On his return to Paris, he became more involved in both the purchase of art and writing about it, publishing his first article in Gazette des Beaux-Arts in 1876. Like most of his publications, it concerned Renaissance art. He also gave two works of art to the Louvre at this time.

In about 1880, Charles Ephrussi became interested in the art of the Impressionists and, within the next few years, purchased some 40 works by Monet, Manet, Degas, Renoir, and Pissarro, among others. He has been identified as the man in a top hat standing with his back to us in Renoir's Luncheon of the Boating Party (Phillips Collection, Washington, D.C.). An account of the collection hanging in his study appears in a letter written in 1881 by the Symbolist poet Jules Laforgue (later published in La Revue blanche). But, to the distress of some of the Impressionists, he continued to buy other types of art, including pictures by his friends Gustave Moreau and Paul Baudry.

It also was at this time that he began to collect Japanese lacquers and netsukes, the subject of Edmund de Waal's The Hare with Amber Eyes (2010) which also devotes considerable attention to Charles' life and artistic interests.

In 1891, Ephrussi moved with his brother Ignace to a grander Parisian hotel at 11, avenue d'Iéna. His taste had changed, and he decorated his part in the Empire style. By this time, he was a well-established figure in the Paris art world, and a welcome guest at some of the most famous salons. He was one of the inspirations for the figure of Swann in Marcel Proust's À la recherche du temps perdu (In Search of Lost Time; titled Remembrance of Things Past in the first translation).

All of this changed with the Dreyfus affair in 1894, which polarized France and caused many doors to be closed to Jews. The Ephrussi family was very prominent and thus became the target of anti-Semitic attacks.

Charles died in 1905, before Dreyfus was exonerated. He had never married, and left much of his estate to his niece Fanny Kann and her husband Théodore Reinach.

== Selected publications ==
- Notes biographiques sur Jacopo de Barbari : dit le Maître au caducée, peintre-graveur vénitien de la fin du XV^{e} siècle, Paris, D. Jouaust, 1876.
- Quelques remarques à propos de l'influence italienne dans une œuvre d'Albert Dürer, Paris, A. Quantin, 1878.
- Les Laques japonais au Trocadéro, Quantin, 1879.
- Inventaire de la collection de la Reine Marie-Antoinette, Paris, 1880, 30 p.
- Un voyage inédit d'Albert Dürer, Paris, Quantin, 1881, 18 p.
- Les Bains de femmes d'Albert Dürer, avec 5 gravures hors texte, Paris, Librairie des bibliophiles, 1881.
- La Prétendue trilogie d'Albert Dürer : le chevalier, le diable et la mort, la mélancolie, saint Jérôme dans sa cellule, Paris, Quantin, 1881.
- Les Nouvelles acquisitions du Musée du Louvre Fra Angelico, Domenico Ghirlandajo, Sandro Botticelli, Paris, Quantin, 1882.
- Albert Dürer et ses dessins, Paris, Quantin, 1882, 429 p.
- Les dessins de la collection His de La Salle, Paris, Gazette des Beaux-Arts, 1883, 43 p.
- Paul Baudry, sa vie et son œuvre, Paris, L. Baschet, 1887, 328 p.
- Étude sur le songe de Poliphile Venise, 1499 et 1545. Paris, 1546, 1883, Paris, L. Techener, 1883; reprinted in 1888, 102 p.
- Étude sur la Chronique de Nuremberg de Hartmann Schedel, avec les bois de Wolgemut et W. Pleydenwurff, Paris, Techener, 1894, 89 p.
