= Théodore Reinach =

French scholar and politician (1860–1928)

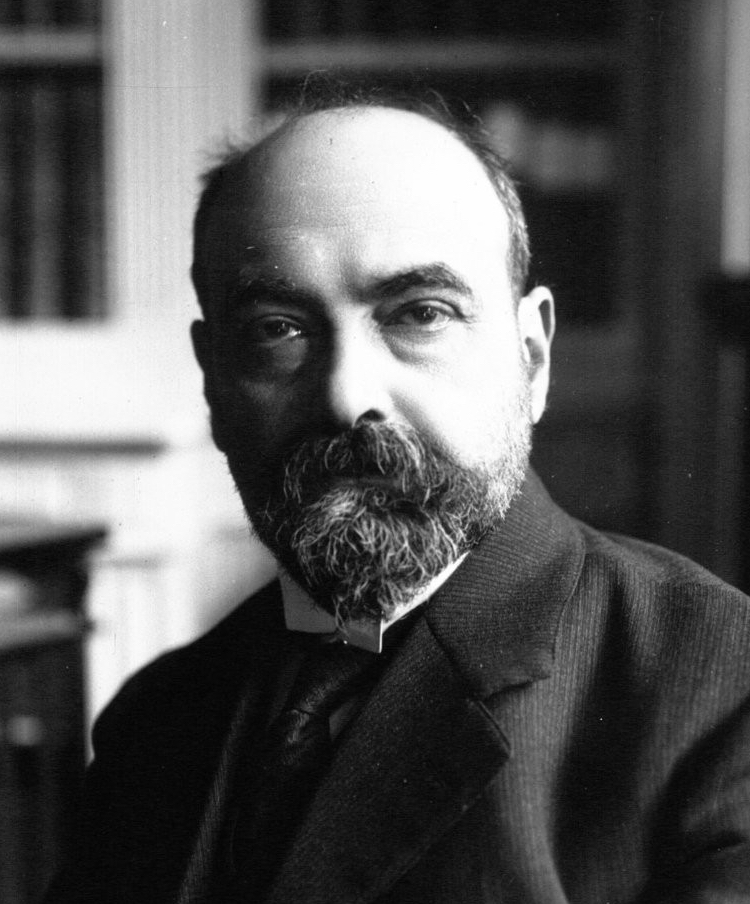
- Reinach in 1913
- Born: 3 July 1860; St.-Germain-en-Laye, France
- Died: 28 October 1928 (aged 68); Paris, France
- Education: Lycée Condorcet, Ecole des Hautes Etudes, École des Sciences Politiques
- Occupations: Archaeologist, mathematician, lawyer, papyrologist, philologist, epigrapher, historian, numismatist, musicologist, professor, politician
- Political party: Bloc des gauches
- Board member of: Académie des Inscriptions et Belles-Lettres
- Spouse(s): (1) Charlotte Marie Evelyne Hirsch (1863–1889) (2) Fanny Thérèse Kann (1870–1917)
- Children: By Charlotte: Hélène, Gabrielle By Fanny: Julien, Léon, Paul, Olivier
- Parent(s): Hermann-Joseph Reinach and Julie Büding
- Relatives: Siblings: Joseph, Salomon
- Awards: Legion of Honor

Théodore Reinach (French pronunciation: [ʁɛ.nak], 3 July 1860 – 28 October 1928) was a French archaeologist, mathematician, lawyer, papyrologist, philologist, epigrapher, historian, numismatist, musicologist, professor, and politician.

== Academic career ==
Educated at the Lycée Condorcet, the Ecole des Hautes Etudes, and the École des Sciences Politiques, Reinach had a brilliant career as a scholar. He practiced law in Paris from 1881 to 1886. He then devoted himself to numismatics. He became chair in ancient numismatics at the Collège de France and was a director of various journals. In 1916, he was awarded the medal of the Royal Numismatic Society and in 1917, during World War I, he worked on assignment in the United States.

He wrote important works on the ancient kingdoms of Asia Minor: Trois royaumes de l'Asie Mineure: Cappadoce, Bithynie, Pont (1888), Mithridate Eupator (1890); Numismatique Ancienne: Trois Royaumes De L'asie Mineure: Cappadoce–Bithynie–Pont (Paris), and also a critical edition and translation with Henri Weil of Pseudo-Plutarch's On Music; and an Histoire des Israélites depuis la ruine de leur indépendance nationale jusqu'à nos jours (2nd ed., 1901).

From 1888 to 1897, he edited the Revue des études grecques.

He received an honorary Doctorate of Letters from the University of Dublin in June 1902.

Reinach was president of the Société française de musicologie (French association of musicologists) in 1928.

== Family and Villa Kerylos ==
In 1886, Reinach married Charlotte Marie Evelyne Hirsch. They had two daughters. She died at age twenty-six in 1889. Reinach remarried in 1891 to Fanny Kann, a daughter of Maximilien Kann and Betty Ephrussi. They made their home in a chateau at La Motte-Servolex in the Savoie department in southeastern France. He was elected to the Chamber of Deputies as a member of the Bloc des gauches, serving from 1906 to 1914.

The Reinachs spent time on the French Riviera and in 1902 hired the architect Emmanuel Pontremoli to design a villa at Beaulieu-sur-Mer. Completed in 1908, the Greek Revival (néo-Grec) house was named Villa Kerylos.

Fanny died in 1917 and Théodore in 1928. He was a member of the Institut de France and on his death he bequeathed the Villa Kerylos to the Institut.

Reinach's son Léon (1893–1943) became the keeper of the archives at Villa Kerylos. In 1944, the Nazi occupiers murdered him, his wife Béatrice de Camondo, and their two children at Auschwitz.

After the War, other Reinach family members lived at the Villa until 1967. It is now a museum open to the public.

Fanny Reinach's mother was a member of the Ephrussi family, whose great-uncle Maurice was married to Béatrice de Rothschild. Inspired by the beauty of the Reinachs' Villa Kérylos and of the area, they built Villa Ephrussi de Rothschild nearby.
