= Ignace von Ephrussi =

Banker and art collector (1829–1899)

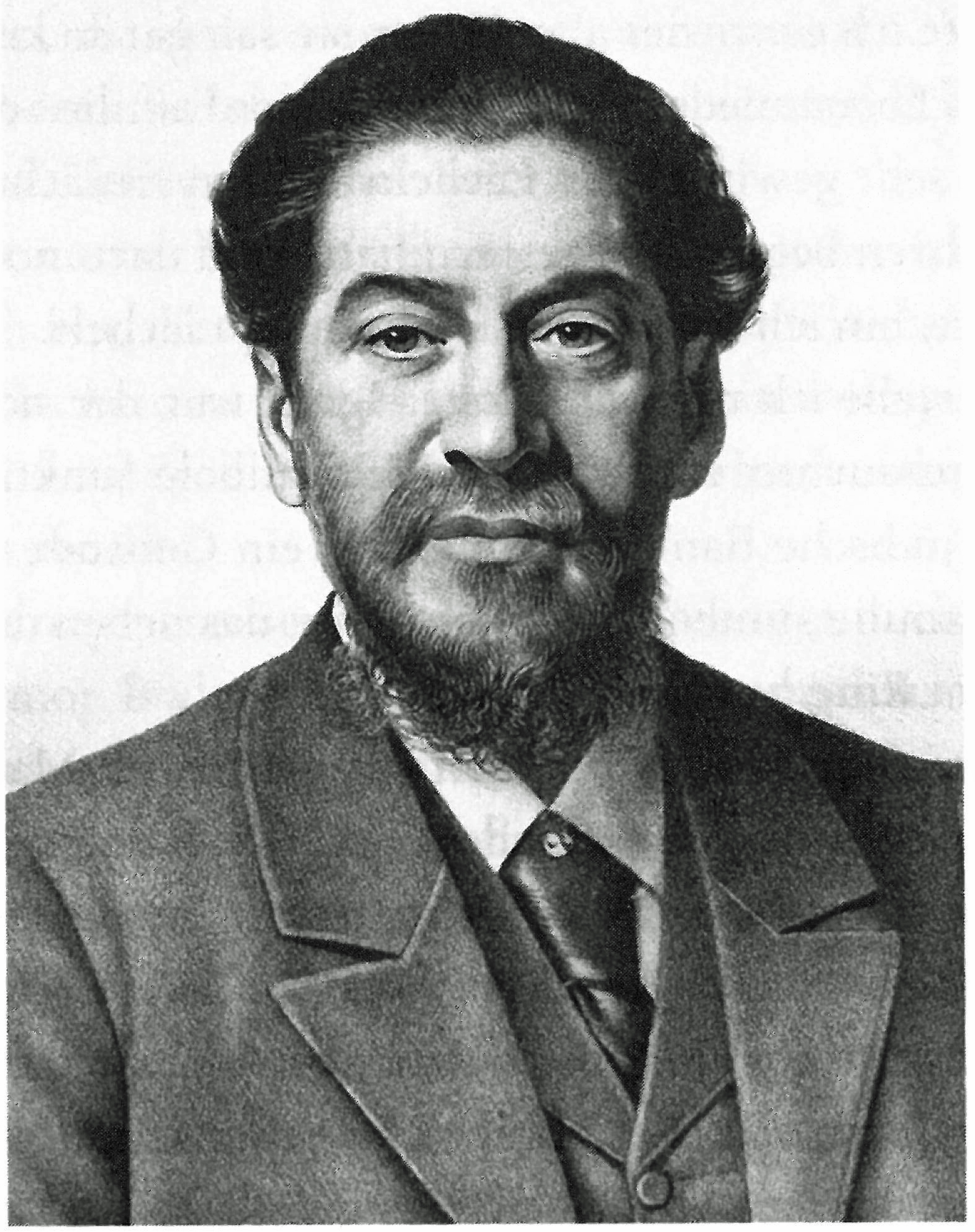
- Ignace von Ephrussi in 1871
- Born: 1829; Berdychiv, Russian Empire (now Ukraine)
- Died: 1899 (aged 69–70); Vienna, Austria
- Occupation: Banker
- Title: Baron
- Spouse: Emily Porges
- Children: 2 sons (including Viktor von Ephrussi), 1 daughter
- Parent(s): Charles Joachim Ephrussi; Belle Levensohn
- Relatives: Michel Ephrussi (half-brother); Maurice Ephrussi (half-brother); Edmund de Waal (great-great-grandson)

Baron Ignace von Ephrussi (1829–1899) was a Russian-Austrian banker and diplomat. He was the head of Ephrussi & Co. in Vienna, Austria.

== Early life ==
Ignace von Ephrussi was born in 1829 in Berdychiv, Russian Empire (now Ukraine). His father was Charles Joachim Ephrussi and his mother, Belle Levensohn. He had a brother, Leon Ephrussi. Their mother died in 1841. After his father married his second wife, Henriette Halperson. He had two half-brothers, Michel Ephrussi and Maurice Ephrussi, and two half-sisters, Therese (who married Leon Fould) and Marie (who married Guy de Percin).

== Career ==
Ephrussi was the head of Ephrussi & Co., his family bank, in Vienna, Austria. He was "the second-richest banker in Vienna."

Ephurris was ennobled by the Emperor of Austria, Franz Joseph I, and he held the title of Baron. He served as Honorary Consul to the King of Sweden and Norway. He was a Knight of the Order of St. Olav.

== Personal life ==
Ephrussi married Emily Porges. They had two sons and a daughter. They resided at the Palais Ephrussi, built for them and completed in 1869.

== Death and legacy ==
Ephrussi died in 1899 in Vienna, Austria. His great-great-grandson, Edmund de Waal, is a British ceramicist and the author of The Hare with the Amber Eyes, a 2010 memoir about his family, including Ignace.
