= Béatrice Ephrussi de Rothschild =

French socialite and art collector

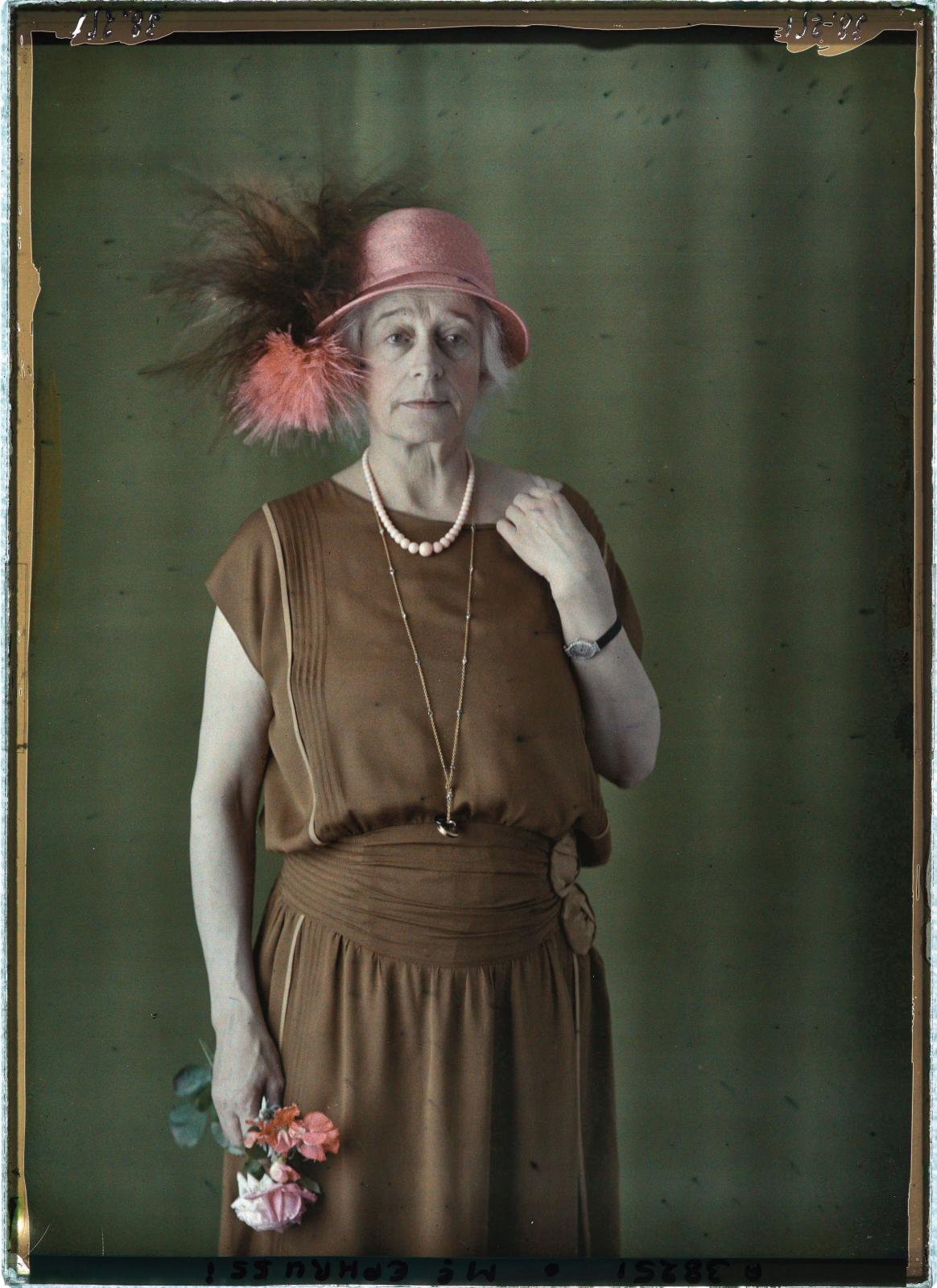
- Born: Charlotte Béatrice de Rothschild; 14 September 1864; Paris, France
- Died: 7 April 1934 (aged 69); Davos, Switzerland
- Spouse: Maurice Ephrussi (m. 1883; div. 1904)
- Parent(s): Alphonse J. de Rothschild; Leonora de Rothschild

Charlotte Béatrice de Rothschild (French pronunciation: [ʃaʁlɔt beatʁis də ʁɔtʃild]; 14 September 1864 – 7 April 1934) was a French socialite, art collector, and a member of the prominent Rothschild banking family of France.

== Early life ==
Charlotte, known as Béatrice, was born in Paris, France, the daughter of banker Alphonse James de Rothschild (1827–1905) and Leonora de Rothschild (1837–1911), daughter of Lionel de Rothschild.

== Life ==
After her marriage, Béatrice and Maurice maintained a home in Monte Carlo, using her wealth to travel the world and to acquire a collection of paintings including Old Masters, plus sculptures, objets d'art, rare porcelain and antique furniture. She also commissioned the Rothschild Fabergé egg in 1902, presenting it to her future sister-in-law, Germaine Alice Halphen, on the occasion of her engagement to Édouard Alphonse James de Rothschild.

In 1902, her husband's cousin, Théodore Reinach began building a Grecian-style villa at Beaulieu-sur-Mer on what became known as the French Riviera. Visiting his Villa Kerylos, Baroness Ephrussi de Rothschild fell in love with the area and acquired a 17-acre (69,000 m^{2}) parcel of land on Cap Ferrat where she built a luxurious Venetian style villa in the Goût Rothschild. She filled it with many of her collections and created her own private zoo with exotic birds and animals including flamingos, budgerigars, monkeys, mongooses, antelopes, and gazelles.

=== The Baroness in Literature ===
The poet Andre de Fouquières wrote: "I remember well the face of Mrs. Maurice Ephrussi, née de Rothschild, a face with immaculately delicate features, framed by silver hair. She was always dressed beautifully in blue, with a ribbon of the same color, and a small fox terrier lying at her feet... Born into a limitless horizon of wealth, yet not conspicuous, except when she held generous parties and, I remember, in particular, one summer night, when we had the privilege to see, in her gardens, which drew from her mansion across to the sea, and bathed in moonlight, Anna Pavlova dancing to the Chopin nocturnes."

== Personal life ==
In 1883, Béatrice de Rothschild married the Russian-born banker Maurice Ephrussi, a member of the Ephrussi family. They divorced in 1904.

In 1934, Béatrice Ephrussi de Rothschild died at the age of 69 at the Hôtel d'Angleterre in Davos, Switzerland. She was buried in Paris in the Père Lachaise cemetery.

In her will, the Baroness bequeathed Villa Ephrussi and its art collections to the Académie des Beaux Arts division of the Institut de France for use as a museum. The property is now open to public visitation. The Friends of Villa Ephrussi de Rothschild are helping to restore the works of art.

Her properties at Avenue Foch (L’hôtel Ephrussi-Rothschild at Avenue Foch 19) in Paris and Reux (Reux castle) were inherited by her nephew, Guy.
