= Jaazeiro =

American-bred Thoroughbred racehorse

- Sire: Sham
- Grandsire: Pretense
- Dam: Rule Formi
- Damsire: Forli
- Sex: Stallion
- Foaled: 30 March 1975
- Country: United States
- Colour: Bay
- Breeder: Carelaine Stable
- Owner: S Vanian; Robert Sangster
- Trainer: François Boutin; Vincent O'Brien
- Record: 9:5-0-1

Major wins
- Prix des Chênes (1977); Irish 2,000 Guineas (1978); St James's Palace Stakes (1978); Sussex Stakes (1978)

Awards
- Timeform rating 124 (1977), 127 (1978)

Jaazeiro (30 March 1975 – 1986) was an American-bred Thoroughbred racehorse and sire. Bred in Kentucky, he was trained in France as two-year-old and established himself as a top-class racehorse by winning the Prix des Chênes and finishing a close fourth in the Grand Critérium. He was based in Ireland in 1978, when he proved himself one of the best milers in Europe, winning the Irish 2000 Guineas, St James's Palace Stakes and Sussex Stakes. He was retired to stud after a defeat in the Waterford Crystal Mile but had little success as a breeding stallion. He died in Spain in 1986 at the age of eleven.

== Background ==
Jaazeiro was a bay horse with no white markings bred in Kentucky by Carelaine Stable. He was from the first crop of foals sired by Sham, an American stallion best known for finishing second to Secretariat in both the Kentucky Derby and the Preakness Stakes. Jaazeiro was the first foal of Rule Formi, an unraced daughter of the Argentinian champion Forli. At the Saratoga Yearling Sales, Jaazeiro was sold for $24,000, well below the sale average, and was sent to Europe to be trained in France by François Boutin.

== Racing career ==
=== 1977: two-year-old season ===
Jaazeiro began his racing career with an impressive win in a maiden race over 1200 metres at Deauville Racecourse in August. In the following month he was moved up in class and distance and started favourite for the Group Three Prix La Rochette over 1600 metres at Longchamp Racecourse but finished fourth, a length behind the winner River Knight. Two weeks later, over the same course and distance, Jaazeiro started 3.4/1 second favourite for the Group Three Prix des Chênes. He was restrained at the back of the field by Philippe Paquet before accelerating in the straight, taking the lead inside the last 200 metres and winning by one and a half lengths from Pyjama Hunt, who was carrying five pounds more. The British jockey Lester Piggott took the ride when Jaazeiro contested France's most prestigious two-year-old race, the Grand Critérium at Longchamp in October. He raced in second place before taking over from the pacemaker early in the straight. He was overtaken by his stable companion Super Concorde 400 metres from the finish and weakened slightly in the closing stages to finish fourth behind Super Concorde, Pyjama Hunt and Acamas, beaten less than two lengths by the winner.

In late 1977 a half share in Jaazeiro was bought by Robert Sangster for a "six figure sum" and the colt was transferred to Ireland where he was trained by Vincent O'Brien at Ballydoyle.

=== 1978: three-year-old season ===
On his debut for his new trainer, Jaazeiro ran very disappointingly, finishing sixth behind Exdirectory when odds on favourite for the Ballymoss Stakes over ten furlongs at the Curragh Racecourse in April. On 13 May, Jaazeiro, ridden by Piggott, started the 11/4 favourite for the Irish 2000 Guineas over one mile at the Curragh. He produced a sustained run on the outside of the twelve runner field to win by half a length from Strong Gale. After the race Vincent O'Brien was called to appear before the racecourse stewards to explain the colt's improved performance. The trainer's explanation, that the horse had been unsuited by the distance and ground conditions in his previous race, was accepted.

In June, Jaazeiro was sent to England to contest the St James's Palace Stakes (then a Group Two race) over one mile at Royal Ascot in which he was matched against the leading British-trained colts Persian Bold and Formidable. Starting at odds of 5/2, he was restrained by Piggott in the early stages before making his challenge in the straight. He took the lead approaching the final furlong and held off the renewed challenge of Persian Bold to win by a head. In his next race Jaazeiro faced older horses, including Radetzky (Queen Anne Stakes), Ovac (Premio Parioli) and Gwent (Jersey Stakes) in the Group One Sussex Stakes at Goodwood Racecourse. Starting the 8/13 favourite, Jaazeiro was ridden with exaggerated confidence by Piggott, held up at the back of the field before switching to the outside to make his challenge in the straight. He quickly went to the front and won easily by two lengths from Radetzky, with Formidable and Ovac in third and fourth. A month later, over the same course and distance, Jaazeiro started 4/11 favourite for the Waterford Crystal Mile despite carrying an eight-pound penalty for his previous Group One wins. Piggott attempted to repeat the tactics employed in the Sussex Stakes, but was unable to reach the leaders and finished third behind Captain James and Formidable.

== Assessment ==
As a two-year-old, Jaazeiro was rated the fourth-best juvenile in the French Free Handicap, behind Super Concorde, Pyjama Hunt and Acamas. The independent Timeform organisation gave him a rating of 124, six pounds behind their top-rated two-year-old Try My Best. In 1978 he was rated 127 by Timeform, three pound below the top-rated miler Homing. In the official International Classification he was rated the ninth best three-year-old in Europe, seven pounds behind the top-rated Ile de Bourbon.

== Stud record ==
Jaazeiro was retired from racing to become a breeding stallion at the Ballylinch Stud at Thomastown, County Kilkenny at an initial fee of £4,000. He was not a success at stud, and was exported to Spain in 1985, dying a year later. He sired one top-class performer in Then Again, who won the Lockinge Stakes and the Queen Anne Stakes in 1987.

== Pedigree ==
Pedigree of Jaazeiro, bay stallion 1975
Sire Sham (USA) 1970	Pretense (USA); 1963	Endeavour	British Empire
Sire Sham (USA) 1970	Pretense (USA); 1963	Endeavour	Himalaya
Sire Sham (USA) 1970	Pretense (USA); 1963	Imitation	Hyperion
Sire Sham (USA) 1970	Pretense (USA); 1963	Imitation	Flattery
Sire Sham (USA) 1970	Sequoia (USA); 1955	Princequillo	Prince Rose
Sire Sham (USA) 1970	Sequoia (USA); 1955	Princequillo	Cosquilla
Sire Sham (USA) 1970	Sequoia (USA); 1955	The Squaw	Sickle
Sire Sham (USA) 1970	Sequoia (USA); 1955	The Squaw	Minnewaska
Dam Rule Formi (USA) 1969	Forli (ARG); 1963	Aristophanes	Hyperion
Dam Rule Formi (USA) 1969	Forli (ARG); 1963	Aristophanes	Commotion
Dam Rule Formi (USA) 1969	Forli (ARG); 1963	Trevisa	Advocate
Dam Rule Formi (USA) 1969	Forli (ARG); 1963	Trevisa	Veneta
Dam Rule Formi (USA) 1969	Miss Nasrullah (USA); 1958	Nasrullah	Nearco
Dam Rule Formi (USA) 1969	Miss Nasrullah (USA); 1958	Nasrullah	Mumtaz Begum
Dam Rule Formi (USA) 1969	Miss Nasrullah (USA); 1958	Not Afraid	Count Fleet
Dam Rule Formi (USA) 1969	Miss Nasrullah (USA); 1958	Not Afraid	Banish Fear (Family: 14-f)
