= Finasseur =

French-bred Thoroughbred racehorse

- Sire: Winkfield's Pride
- Grandsire: Winkfield
- Dam: Finaude
- Damsire: Clamart
- Sex: Stallion
- Foaled: 1902
- Country: France
- Colour: Chestnut
- Breeder: Edmond Blanc
- Owner: Michel Ephrussi
- Trainer: James d'Okhuysen
- Record: 17: 7-5-2 £25,586
- Earnings: £25,586 (equivalent)

Major wins
- Prix des Chênes (1904); Prix du Jockey Club (1905); Grand Prix de Paris (1905); Prix du President de la Republique (1905); Grand Prix de Bruxelles (1905)

Honours
- Prix Finasseur at Saint-Cloud Racecourse

Finasseur (1902–1909) was a French Thoroughbred racehorse who, at age three, won two of the most prestigious races in France.

== Background ==
Finasseur was bred by Edmond Blanc at his Haras de Jardy stud farm at Marnes-la-Coquette about sixteen kilometers west of central Paris and purchased for racing by Michel Ephrussi, a wealthy businessman connected to the Rothschild banking family of France.

Ephrussi entrusted the colt's race conditioning to trainer James d'Okhuysen.

== Racing career ==
Sent to race at age two, Finasseur notably won the 1904 Prix des Chênes at Longchamp Racecourse in Paris.

As a three-year-old, Finasseur was the dominant horse in French racing, winning the Prix du President de la Republique at Maisons-Laffitte Racecourse, the then 1½ mile French Derby at Chantilly Racecourse. He was ridden to victory by future United States Racing Hall of Fame inductee Nash Turner. An American, Turner came to France for fellow American owner/trainer H. Eugene Leigh and chose to make his permanent home there. Finasseur then won what was the most prestigious race in France at the time, the Grand Prix de Paris. His other major win came in the Grand Prix de Bruxelles at the Hippodrome de Boitsfort in the Boitsfort suburb of Brussels, Belgium.

== Stud career ==
Retired to stud duty at his owner's Haras du Gazon in Normandy, Finasseur had only been bred to a few mares when he injured himself in his stall and broke a leg bone. The injury forced his owner to euthanize the valuable horse. Of note, a Finasseur filly named Stanzia was purchased in utero by Haras San Ignacio in Argentina. Her colt, Solpido, was a successful runner who broke several Argentinian time records.
