= Prix des Chênes =

Flat horse race in France

- Class: Group 3
- Location: Longchamp Racecourse; Paris, France
- Inaugurated: 1882
- Race type: Flat / Thoroughbred
- Website: france-galop.com

Race information
- Distance: 1,600 metres (1 mile)
- Surface: Turf
- Track: Right-handed
- Qualification: Two-year-old colts and geldings excluding Group winners
- Weight: 58 kg
- Purse: €56,000 (2020); 1st: €28,000

Prix des Chênes
2025
Oceans Four	Elastic	Canalejas

Previous years
2024
Misunderstood	Nesthorn	Cacofonix
2023
Zabiari	Grey Man	Rock The Kasbah
2022
Kubrick	Adelaide River	Pivotal Trigger
2021
Ancient Rome	Scherzo	Claim The Crown

2020-2011
2020
Policy Of Truth	Mouillage	My Kurkum
2019
Ecrivain	Hopeful	Al Dabaran
2018
Anodor	Insandi	Shaman
2017
Stage Magic	Olmedo	Zyzzyva
2016
Stimulation	High Alpha	National Defense
2015
Cloth Of Stars	Vedevani	Sixth Sense
2014
Evasive's First	De Treville	Cherek
2013
Ectot	Elliptique	Daraybi
2012
Pearl Flute	Visiyani	Kitaya
2011
Vizir Bere	Saint Pellerin	Kadyny

2010-2001
2010
French Navy	Havane Smoker	Surfrider
2009
Behkabad	Helene Spirit	Emirates Dream
2008
Calvados Blues	Naval Officer	Canwinn
2007
Blue Chagall	Dubai Time	Beret Rouge
2006
Spirit One	San Domenico	Cervinio
2005
Carlotamix	Linda's Lad	Zato
2004
Helios Quercus	Musketier	Vatori
2003
Bago	Valixir	Happy Crusader
2002
Dalakhani	Green Channel	Graikos
2001
Shaanmer	Caesarion	Night Bokbel

2000-1990
2000
Equerry	Mizzen Mast	Panis
1999
Jokerman	Whyome	Petroselli
1998
Grazalema	Way Of Light	Zeitz
1997
Second Empire	Muhtathir	Tenbyssimo
1996
Nombre Premier	Majorien	Peintre Celebre
1995
Manninamix	Winter Quarters	Martiniquais
1994
Coco Passion	Privity	Diamond Mix
1993
Gunboat Diplomacy	Cheyenne Dream	Arabian Sky
1992
Dancienne	Dernier Empereur	Ranger
1991
Litron	Greek Air	Saintry
1990
Reason To Trick	Camayan	Democratic

The Prix des Chênes is a Group 3 flat horse race in France open to two-year-old thoroughbred colts and geldings. It is run at Longchamp over a distance of 1,600 metres (about 1 mile), and it is scheduled to take place each year in September.

== History ==
The event was originally open to two-year-olds of either gender. It was established in 1882, and was contested over 1,600 metres at Longchamp.

The race was abandoned during World War I, with no running from 1914 to 1919.

Due to World War II, the Prix des Chênes was cancelled in 1939 and 1940. It was held at Le Tremblay in 1943, and was cancelled again in 1944.

The race was cut to 1,400 metres in 1964. It reverted to 1,600 metres in 1966.

The Prix des Chênes left Longchamp after 1988. For brief spells it was staged at Saint-Cloud (1989–90, 1994), Évry (1991–93) and Chantilly (1995). It returned to Longchamp and was closed to fillies in 1996.

The race formerly served as a trial for the Grand Critérium. It is now more usually a trial for the Critérium International.

== Records ==
Leading jockey (5 wins):

- Frank O'Neill – Mongolie (1911), Pirpiriol (1912), Phusla (1920), Saint Hubert (1922), Cadum (1923)
- Charles Semblat – Lucide (1924), Becassine (1925), Verdi (1928), Cassandre (1930), Vaucouleurs (1931)
- Yves Saint-Martin – Taraval (1963), Bord a Bord (1964), Stanleyville (1972), Captive Island (1984), Splendid Moment (1985)

Leading trainer (10 wins):

- André Fabre – Along All (1988), Manninamix (1995), Grazalema (1998), Equerry (2000), Shaanmer (2001), Carlotamix (2005), French Navy (2010), Cloth of Stars (2015), Akihiro (2016), Ancient Rome (2021)

Leading owner (6 wins):

- Édouard de Rothschild – Vertumne (1902), Cadum (1923), Bubbles (1927), Godiche (1929), Gonfalonier (1936), Irifle (1938)

== Winners since 1978 ==
Year	Winner	Jockey	Trainer	Owner	Time
1976	Silk Slipper	Maurice Philipperon	John Cunnington	Michael Sobell	1:45.8
1977	Jaazeiro	Philippe Paquet	François Boutin	Souren Vanian	1:38.7
1978	Discretion	Maurice Philipperon	John Cunnington Jr.	Michael Sobell
1979	In Fijar	Henri Samani	Mitri Saliba	Mahmoud Fustok	1:40.00
1980	Dunphy	Freddy Head	Criquette Head	Ghislaine Head
1981	Bon Sang	Alfred Gibert	Mitri Saliba	Mahmoud Fustok
1982	Pluralisme	Freddy Head	Alec Head	Jacques Wertheimer
1983	Mendez	Cash Asmussen	François Boutin	Philip Niarchos	1:47.10
1984	Captive Island	Yves Saint-Martin	Robert Collet	Robert Sangster
1985	Splendid Moment	Yves Saint-Martin	Robert Collet	Richard Strauss
1986	Fotitieng	Freddy Head	François Boutin	Stavros Niarchos
1987	Harmless Albatross	Alain Lequeux	Robert Collet	Richard Strauss
1988	Along All	Cash Asmussen	André Fabre	Daniel Wildenstein
1989	Funambule	Guy Guignard	Criquette Head	Etti Plesch	1:41.70
1990	Reason to Trick	Cash Asmussen	John Hammond	Henri Chalhoub
1991	Litron	Dragan Ilic	Theo Grieper	Sonja Wewering	1:42.70
1992	Dancienne	Dominique Boeuf	Élie Lellouche	Charles Sarmant	1:53.67
1993	Gunboat Diplomacy	Olivier Peslier	Élie Lellouche	Daniel Wildenstein	1:47.32
1994	Coco Passion	William Mongil	John Hammond	Henri Chalhoub	1:52.70
1995	Manninamix	Thierry Jarnet	André Fabre	Jean-Luc Lagardère	1:46.70
1996	Nombre Premier	Philippe Sogorb	Alain de Royer-Dupré	Marquesa de Moratalla	1:44.80
1997	Second Empire	Michael Kinane	Aidan O'Brien	Tabor / Magnier	1:35.40
1998	Grazalema	Olivier Peslier	André Fabre	Sheikh Mohammed	1:49.60
1999	Jokerman	Jean-René Dubosc	Jean-Claude Rouget	Mrs Bertrand Clin	1:38.50
2000	Equerry	Frankie Dettori	André Fabre	Sheikh Mohammed	1:38.05
2001	Shaanmer	Olivier Peslier	André Fabre	Edouard de Rothschild	1:46.50
2002	Dalakhani	Christophe Soumillon	Alain de Royer-Dupré	HH Aga Khan IV	1:41.70
2003	Bago	Thierry Gillet	Jonathan Pease	Niarchos Family	1:39.30
2004	Helios Quercus	Alexandre Roussel	Cyriaque Diard	Thierry Maudet	1:40.60
2005	Carlotamix	Thierry Jarnet	André Fabre	HH Aga Khan IV	1:42.80
2006	Spirit One	Dominique Boeuf	Philippe Demercastel	Bouzid Chehboub	1:45.10
2007	Blue Chagall	Johan Victoire	Henri-Alex Pantall	William Preston	1:40.80
2008	Calvados Blues	Ioritz Mendizabal	Philippe Demercastel	Malcolm Parrish	1:43.30
2009	Behkabad	Christophe Lemaire	Jean-Claude Rouget	HH Aga Khan IV	1:39.30
2010	French Navy	Maxime Guyon	André Fabre	Godolphin	1:46.40
2011	Vizir Bere	Christophe Soumillon	Didier Prod'homme	Bryan Lynam	1:41.40
2012	Pearl Flute	Umberto Rispoli	Francis-Henri Graffard	Pearl Bloodstock Ltd	1:45.61
2013	Ectot	Grégory Benoist	Élie Lellouche	Augustin-Normand / Vidal	1:43.11
2014	Evasive's First	Franck Blondel	Frederic Rossi	Jean-Claude Seroul	1:43.04
2015	Cloth of Stars	Mickael Barzalona	André Fabre	Godolphin	1:41.16
2016	Akihiro (Note: The 2016 running took place at Chantilly while Longchamp was closed for redevelopment)	Maxime Guyon	André Fabre	Wertheimer et Frère	1:38.12
2017	Stage Magic	James Doyle	Charlie Appleby	Godolphin	1:38.77
2018	Anodor	Aurelien Lemaitre	Freddy Head	Ecurie Jean-Louis Bouchard	1:41.12
2019	Ecrivain	Maxime Guyon	Carlos Laffon-Parias	Wertheimer et Frère	1:40.97
2020	Policy Of Truth	Maxime Guyon	Pia & Joachim Brandt	Haras Du Logis Saint Germain	1:40.83
2021	Ancient Rome	Mickael Barzalona	André Fabre	Tabor / Smith / Magnier	1:42.57
2022	Kubrick	Cristian Demuro	Jean-Claude Rouget	White Birch Farm	1:41.80
2026	Zakkan	Mickael Barzalona	Francis-Henri Graffard	Aga Khan Studs	1:36.28

== Earlier winners ==
- 1882: Parthenope
- 1883: Carmelite
- 1884: Maman Berthe
- 1885:
- 1886: Concordia
- 1887: Fumiste
- 1888: Tire-Larigot
- 1889: Master Gillam
- 1890: Espion
- 1891: Incitatus
- 1892: Argenteuil
- 1893: Chartreuse
- 1894: Le Justicier
- 1895: Epicharis
- 1896:
- 1897: Infant
- 1898: Maurice
- 1899: Love Grass
- 1900: Saint Armel
- 1901: Montgaillard
- 1902: Vertumne
- 1903: Feuille de Chou
- 1904: Finasseur
- 1905: Moulins la Marche
- 1906: Imperia
- 1907: Quintette
- 1908: Kumamoto
- 1909: Soleil
- 1910: Faucheur
- 1911: Mongolie
- 1912: Pirpiriol
- 1913: Oued
- 1914–19: no race
- 1920: Phusla
- 1921: Syntheme
- 1922: Saint Hubert
- 1923: Cadum
- 1924: Lucide
- 1925: Becassine
- 1926: La Desirade
- 1927: Bubbles
- 1928: Verdi
- 1929: Godiche
- 1930: Cassandre
- 1931: Vaucouleurs
- 1932: Pantalon
- 1933: Denver
- 1934: Ping Pong
- 1935: Don Milo
- 1936: Gonfalonier
- 1937: Love Secret
- 1938: Irifle
- 1939–40: no race
- 1941: My Drake / Tartarin *
- 1942: Micipsa
- 1943: Vole Vite
- 1944: no race
- 1945: Fasano
- 1946:
- 1947:
- 1948: Fontenay
- 1949: Eppi d'Or
- 1950: Lavarede
- 1951: Galeace
- 1952: Corioline
- 1953: Alba Nox
- 1954: Fersen
- 1955:
- 1956: Mourne
- 1957: Arsar
- 1958: Tiepoletto
- 1959: Tanata
- 1960: Misti
- 1961: Tracy
- 1962: Beautiful
- 1963: Taraval
- 1964: Bord a Bord
- 1965: Behistoun
- 1966: Frontal
- 1967: Verglas
- 1968: Tuxpan
- 1969: Experio
- 1970: Maraschino
- 1971: Banaldo
- 1972: Stanleyville
- 1973: Bayraan
- 1974: Mariacci
- 1975: French Swanee

* The 1941 race was a dead-heat and has joint winners.

== See also ==
- List of French flat horse races
