= Palais Ephrussi =

Palace in Vienna, Austria

Coordinates: 48°12′49″N 16°21′44″E

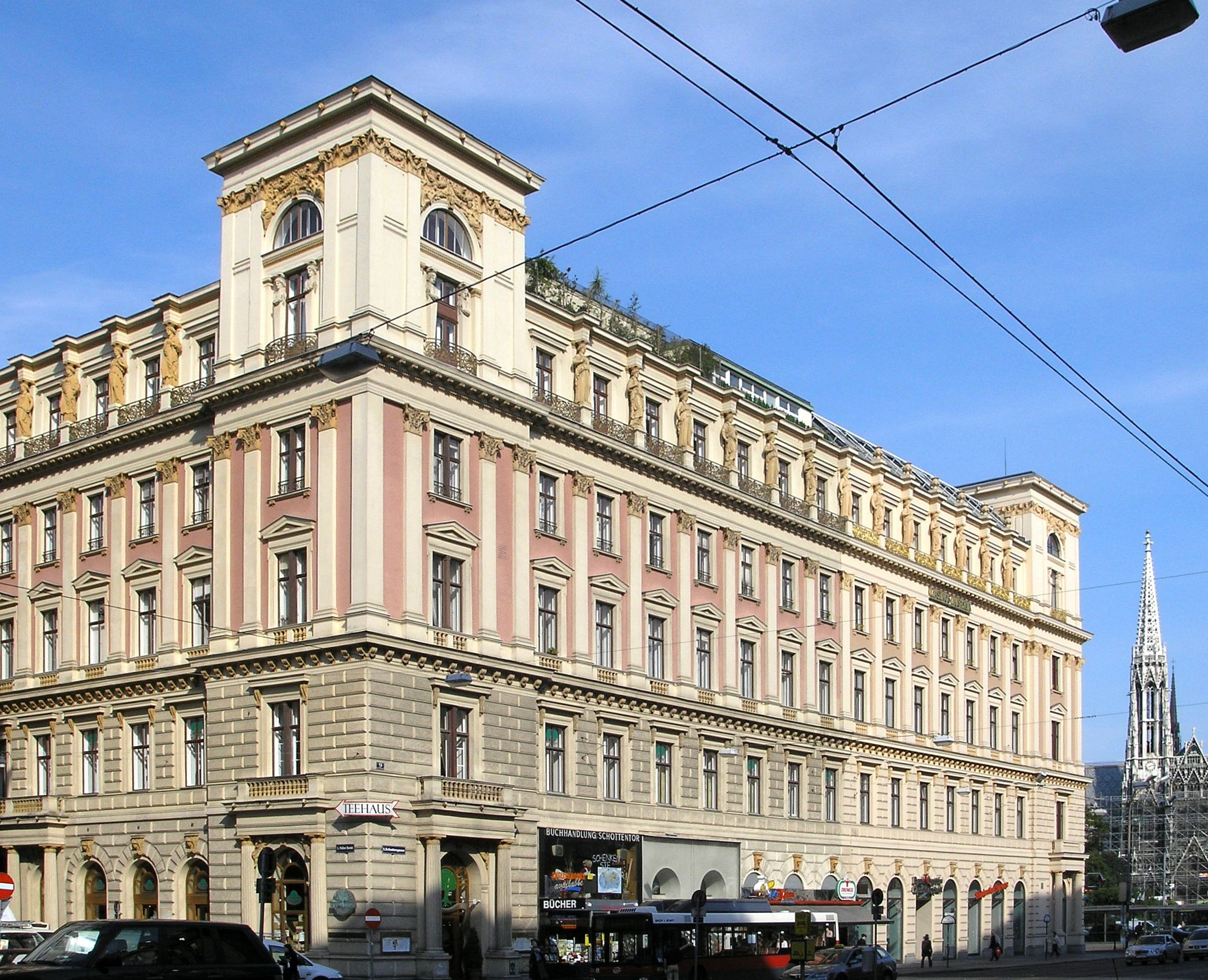
Palais Ephrussi, Vienna (2006). The restored palace has now been converted into shops

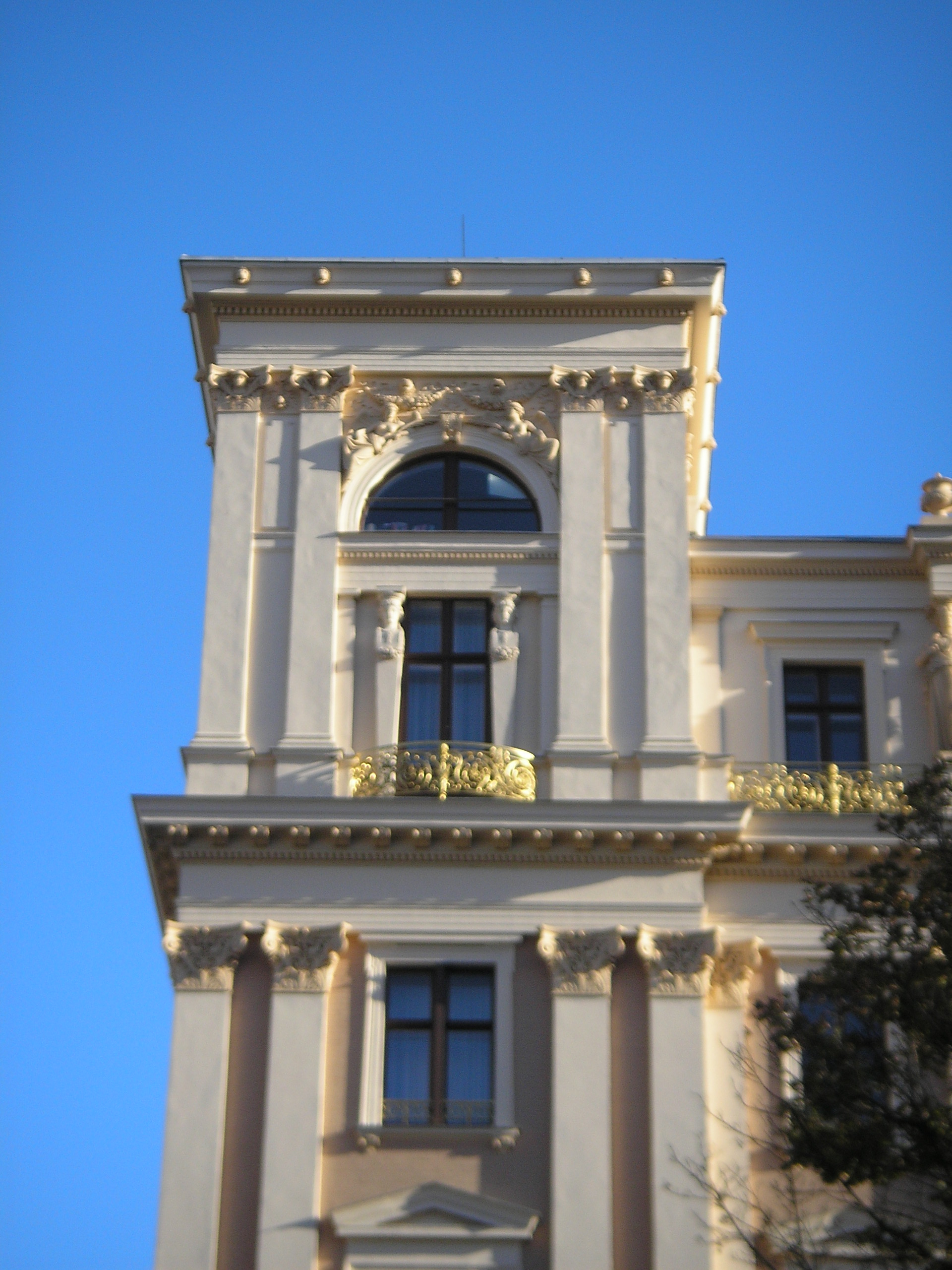
Palais Ephrussi, detail

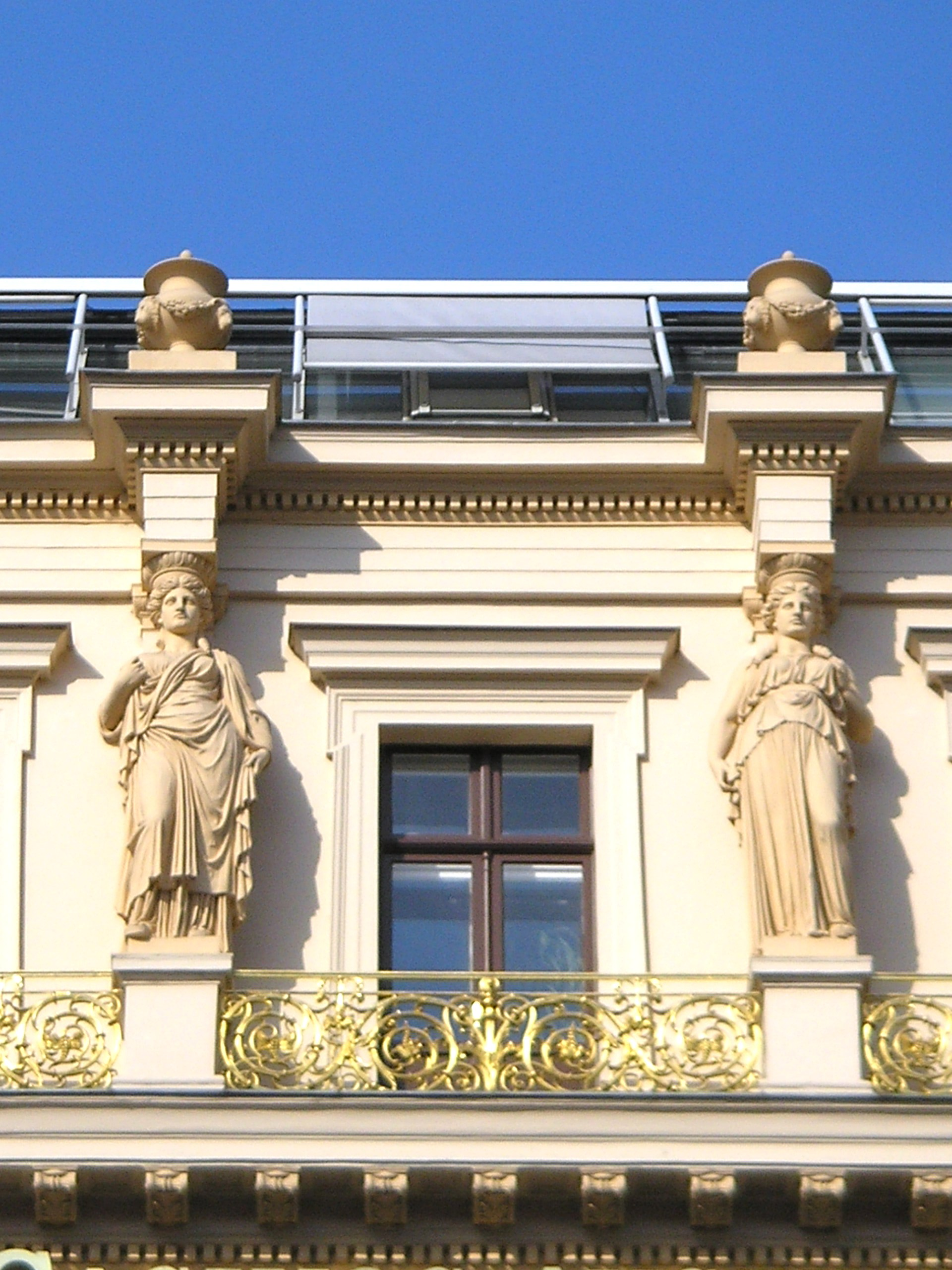
Palais Ephrussi, windows

Palais Ephrussi is a former Ringstraßenpalais in Vienna. It was built for the Ephrussi family of financiers by Theophil Freiherr von Hansen, the architect of the Austrian Parliament Building. It is on the Ringstrasse, specifically the Universitätsring (formerly Doctor-Karl-Lueger-Ring), opposite the Votivkirche.

== History ==
Unlike traditional baroque noble palaces in Vienna, the Palais Ephrussi was built in the late 19th century and is therefore considered a Ringstraßenpalais. It is five storeys high and built in the typical neo-Renaissance style popular at the time of its construction.

The history of the building and the family is described in great detail in The Hare with Amber Eyes by Edmund de Waal, whose grandmother - Elisabeth de Waal née Ephrussi, born 1899 - spent her childhood and youth there; De Waal combined first-hand information from her with extensive research in available documents.

=== World War II ===
As noted by de Waal, shortly following Austria's annexation to Nazi Germany in the 1938 Anschluss, the building's then owner Viktor Ephrussi and his son Rudolf were arrested by the Gestapo and threatened with being sent to the Dachau Concentration Camp. Their release was conditioned upon the 78-year-old Viktor Ephrussi signing away his ownership of the building and its entire contents, including many valuable works of art and the library in which were many rare incunabula.

Members of the family were restricted to two rooms at the back of their former home, and were allowed to leave Austria only after giving up the rest of their property, including the family's Ephrussi Bank.

The house was then taken over by the new Nazi administration of Austria, and was used as such until 1945. For part of that time, it was used by the Nazi Party ideologue Alfred Rosenberg when he was in charge of introducing the Nazi racist doctrines in newly annexed Austria.

The palace was heavily damaged during World War II. One whole wing was destroyed. Following the defeat of the Nazis, the palace was in the American sector of Vienna and its surviving part used by the American Headquarters to house its Legal Council Property Control.

Elisabeth de Waal, who visited Vienna in December 1945 after relocating to England, found paintings of her mother and grandmother still hanging on a wall, having evidently been kept for decoration by the Nazis. She also met a former servant named Anna who had saved and loyally kept the family's collection of valuable Japanese netsuke.

In 1950, after considerable litigation, surviving members of the Ephrussi family scattered throughout the world regained legal title to the building (as well as to some of the many books and works of art taken from it). But having no wish to go back to live in Vienna, which held painful and traumatic memories for them, the Ephrussis sold the building for the equivalent of $50,000 - a price lower than its true value, due to its damaged condition and to the still depressed economic situation in Vienna at the time.

=== Present day ===
From 1969 to 2009 the renovated palace served as the headquarters of Casinos Austria, whose management facilitated Edmund de Waal's research into the building's history. The destroyed wing has been replaced with a modern building, which housed the OPEC for a while.

== See also ==
- The Hare with Amber Eyes
