= Château de Reux =

Castle in Calvados, Normandy, France

Coordinates: 49.2753°N 0.1563°E

- Interactive map of the Château de Reux area

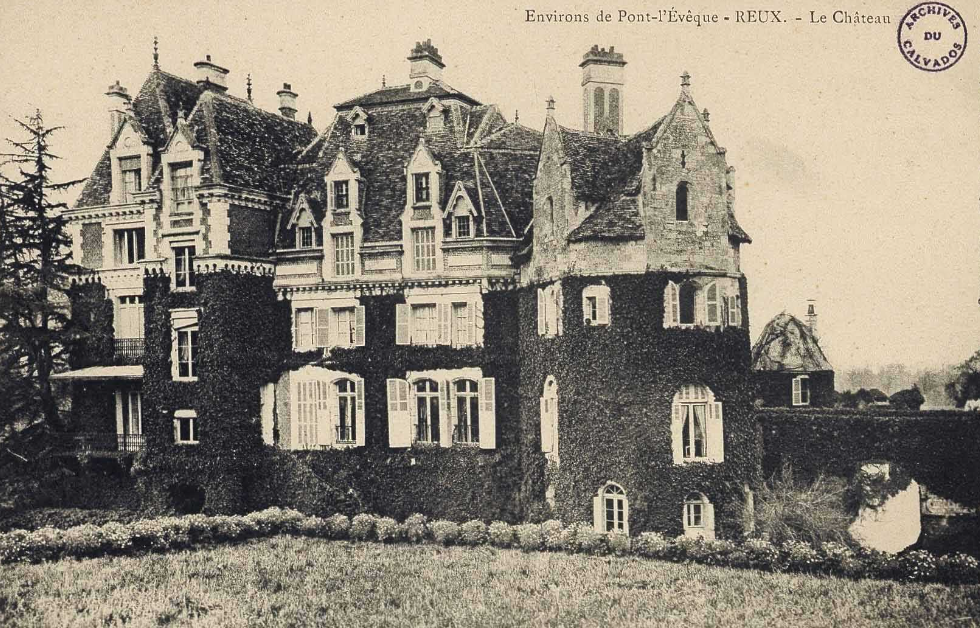
Postcard of Château de Reux

The Château de Reux is a castle in Reux, Calvados, Normandy, France.

== History ==
The castle was acquired by Édouard Alphonse James de Rothschild in 1868.

The garden includes a small pond. There is also artwork by Norbert Kricke.

As of 1777, it included faience by Bernard Palissy.

In the 1960s, German painter Francis Bott was commissioned to design the stained glass in the chapel.
