= Reux =

- Commune
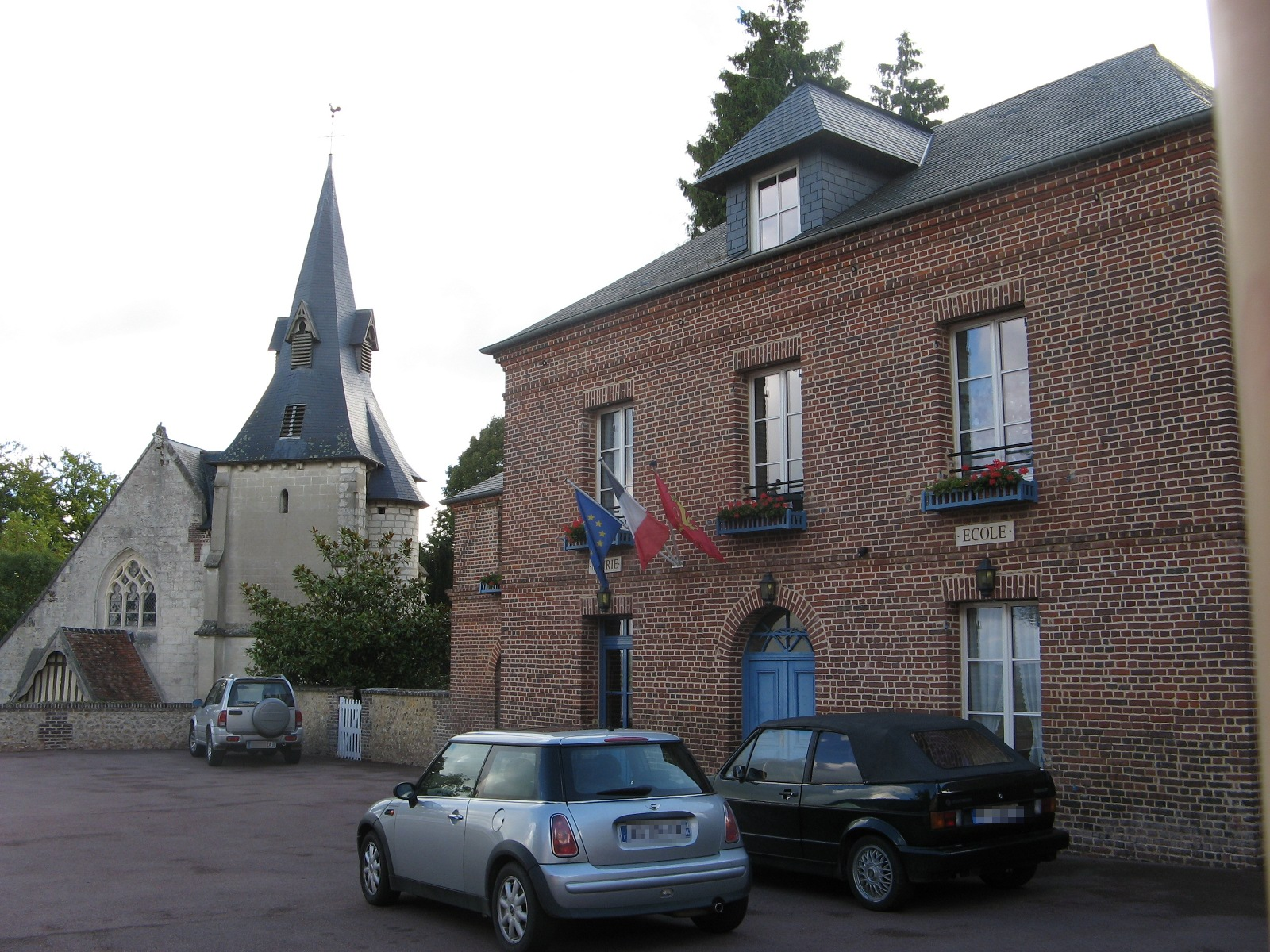
- The church and town hall in Reux
- Location of Reux
- Location within France Location within Normandy
- Coordinates: 49°16′29″N 0°09′08″E
- Country: France
- Region: Normandy
- Department: Calvados
- Arrondissement: Lisieux
- Canton: Pont-l'Évêque
- Intercommunality: Terre d'Auge

Government
  - Mayor (2020–2026): Jean Dutacq
- Area^{1}: 7.39 km^{2} (2.85 sq mi)
- Elevation: 70 m (230 ft)
- Highest elevation: 124 m (407 ft)
- Lowest elevation: 4 m (13 ft)
- Population (2023): 415
  - Density: 56.2/km^{2} (145/sq mi)
- Time zone: UTC+01:00 (CET)
  - Summer (DST): UTC+02:00 (CEST)
- INSEE/Postal code: 14534 /14130
- ^{1} French Land Register data, which excludes lakes, ponds, glaciers > 1 km^{2} (0.386 sq mi or 247 acres) and river estuaries.

Reux is a commune in the Calvados department in the Normandy region in northwestern France.

It is the location of the Château de Reux, a Rothschild family residence.

== Population ==
Historical population
Year	Pop.	±% p.a.
1968	229	—
1975	214	−0.96%
1982	207	−0.47%
1990	263	+3.04%
1999	251	−0.52%
2007	326	+3.32%
2012	384	+3.33%
2017	410	+1.32%
2023	415	+0.20%
Source: INSEE

== See also ==
- Communes of the Calvados department
- Rio (disambiguation)
- Ríos (disambiguation)
