= Villa Ephrussi de Rothschild =

Villa on the French Riviera

Coordinates: 43°41′48″N 7°19′42.5″E

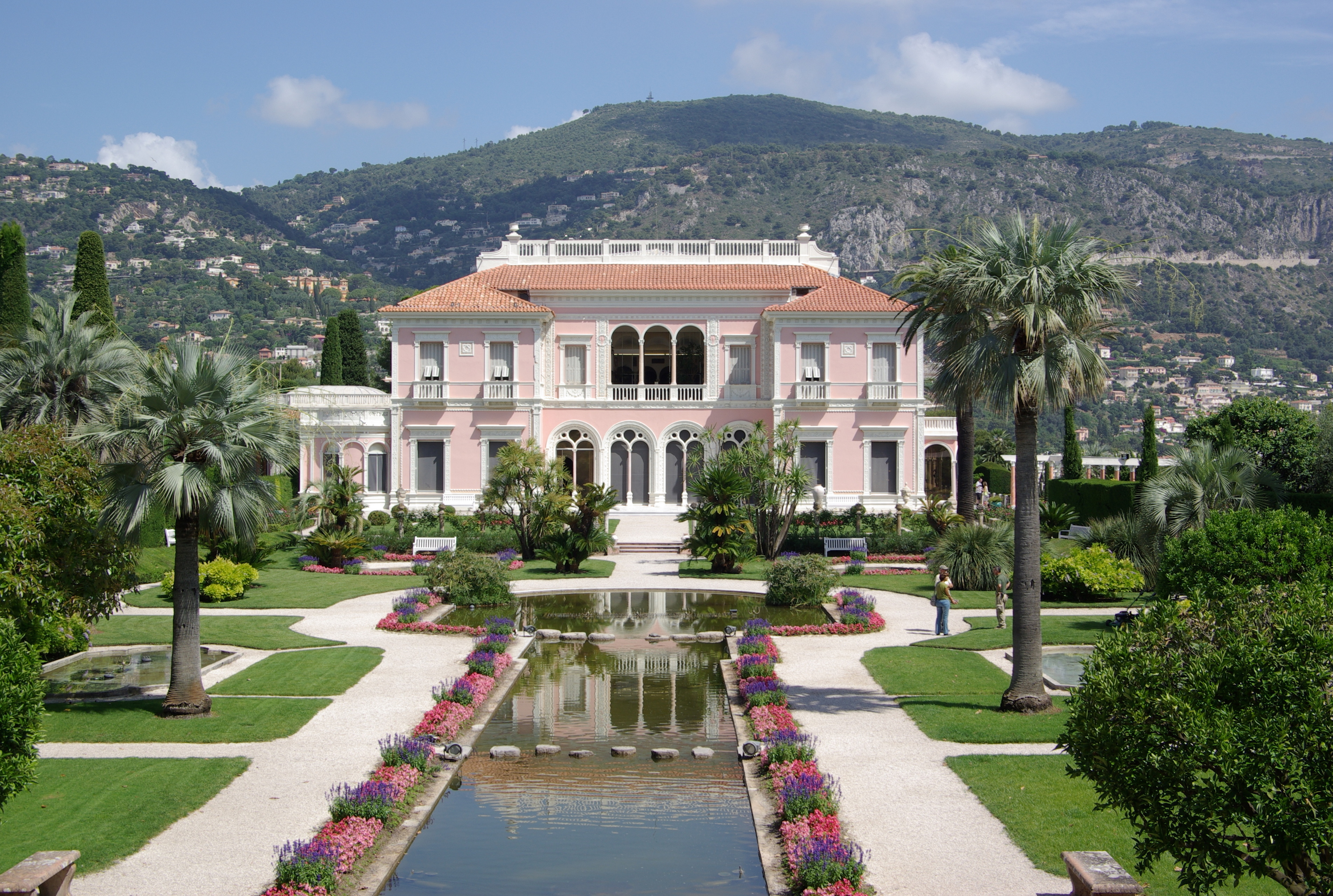
Gardenside view of the Villa Ephrussi de Rothschild

The Villa Ephrussi de Rothschild, also called Villa Île-de-France, is a French seaside villa located at Saint-Jean-Cap-Ferrat on the French Riviera. Designed by the French architect Aaron Messiah, it was built between 1907 and 1912 by Baroness Béatrice de Rothschild (1864–1934).

A member of the Rothschild banking family and the wife of the banker Baron Maurice de Ephrussi, Béatrice de Rothschild built her rose-tinted villa on a promontory on the isthmus of Cap Ferrat overlooking the Mediterranean Sea. The Baroness filled the mansion with antique furniture, Old Master paintings, sculptures, objets d'art and assembled an extensive collection of rare porcelain. The gardens are classified by the Ministry of Culture as one of the Remarkable Gardens of France, whilst the villa itself has been classified as a monument historique since 1996.

Upon her death in 1934, the Baroness donated the property and its collections to the Académie des Beaux-Arts division of the Institut de France. It is now open to the public.

== Gardens ==
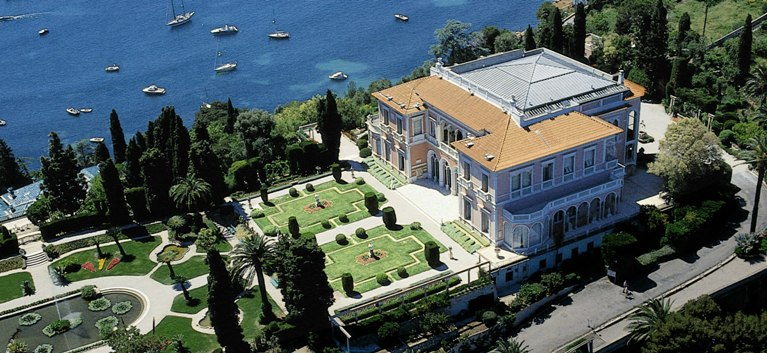
Aerial view of the Villa Ephrussi de Rothschild and its gardens

The villa is surrounded by nine gardens, each on a different theme: French, Spanish, Japanese, Florentine, Provençal, exotic, a stone garden, a rose garden and a garden of Sèvres. They were created between 1905 and 1912 under the direction of landscape architect Achille Duchêne.

The garden was conceived in the form of a ship, to be viewed from the loggia of the house, which was like the bridge of a vessel, with the sea visible on all sides. It was inspired by a voyage she made on the liner Île de France, and the villa was given that name. The thirty gardeners who maintained the garden were dressed as sailors, with berets with red pom-poms.

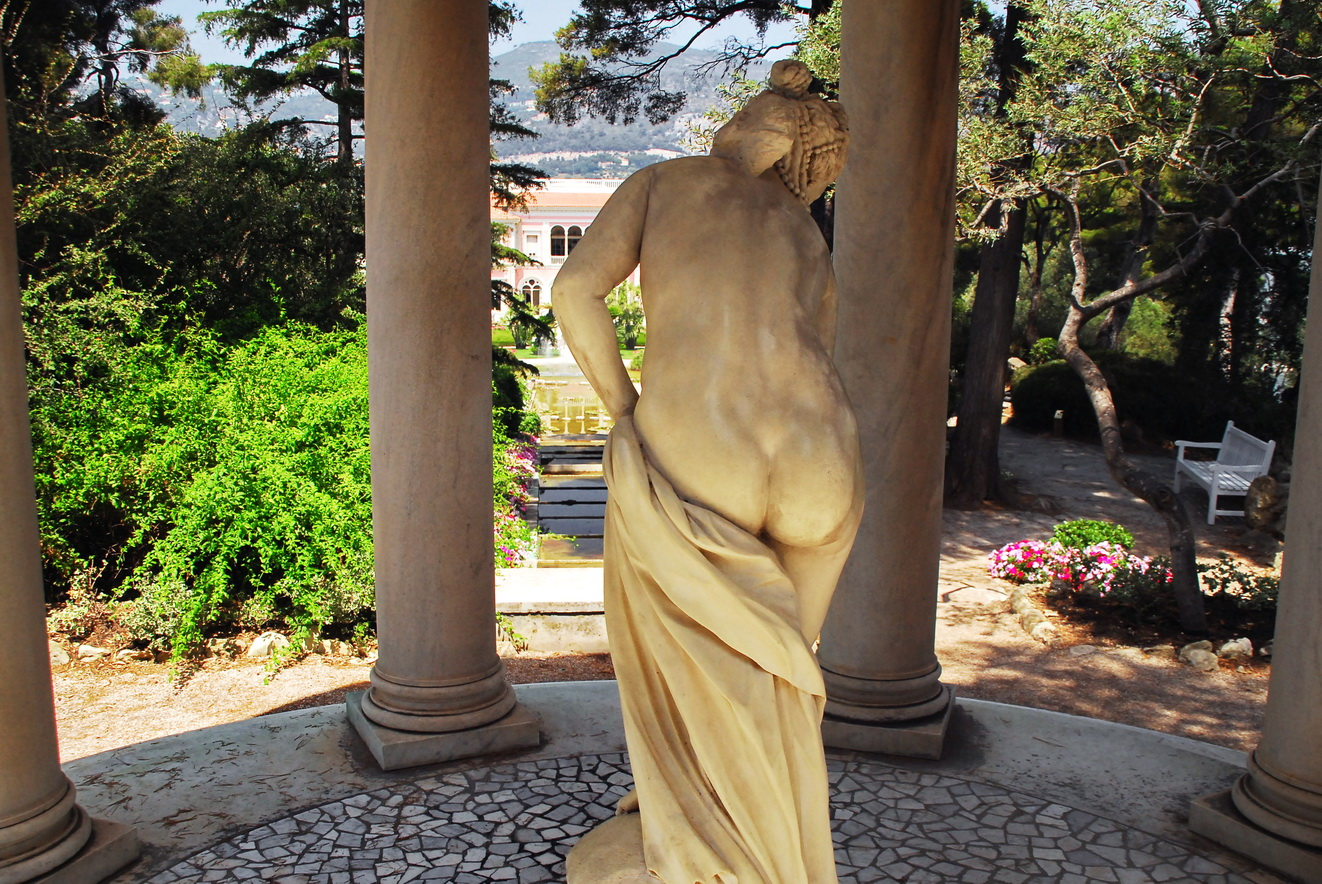
Temple of Love

The garden à la française is the largest and occupies the area behind the villa. Next to the villa there is a terrace with a formal French garden and topiaries. Beyond the terrace is a park with palm trees and a long basin, ornamented with fountains, statues, and basins with water lilies and other aquatic plants. On the far end of the park is a hill covered with cypress trees, surrounding a replica garden of the Temple of Love at the Petit Trianon palace in Versailles. The slope below the temple has a cascade of water in the form of a stairway, which feeds into the large basin.

A stairway from the French garden descends to the circle of gardens on the lower level. The Spanish garden features a shaded courtyard and fountain, with aromatic plants, Catalan amphorae, as well as a Gallo-Roman bench. The Florentine garden, facing the rade of Villefranche-sur-Mer, has a grand stairway, an artificial grotto and an ephebe of marble. Beyond the Florentine garden is the lapidary, or stone garden, with an assortment of gargoyles, columns and other architectural elements from ancient and medieval buildings. The Japanese garden has a wooden pavilion, a bridge and lanterns. The exotic garden features giant cactus and other rare plants. A rose garden with a statue surrounded by columns adjoins it, where pink, the favorite color of the owner, is the predominant colour. On the east side of the villa is a garden of native plants of Provence and a garden with decorations of Sèvres porcelain.

The villa was registered as a historical monument in 1996.

== Events ==
Every year the Villa Ephrussi de Rothschild puts on The Painters' Day in June. The villa opens its doors to the artists who want to find their inspiration and practise their art in one of the nine gardens of the site.

The villa is also the location of the annual summer opera festival Les Opera Azuriales.

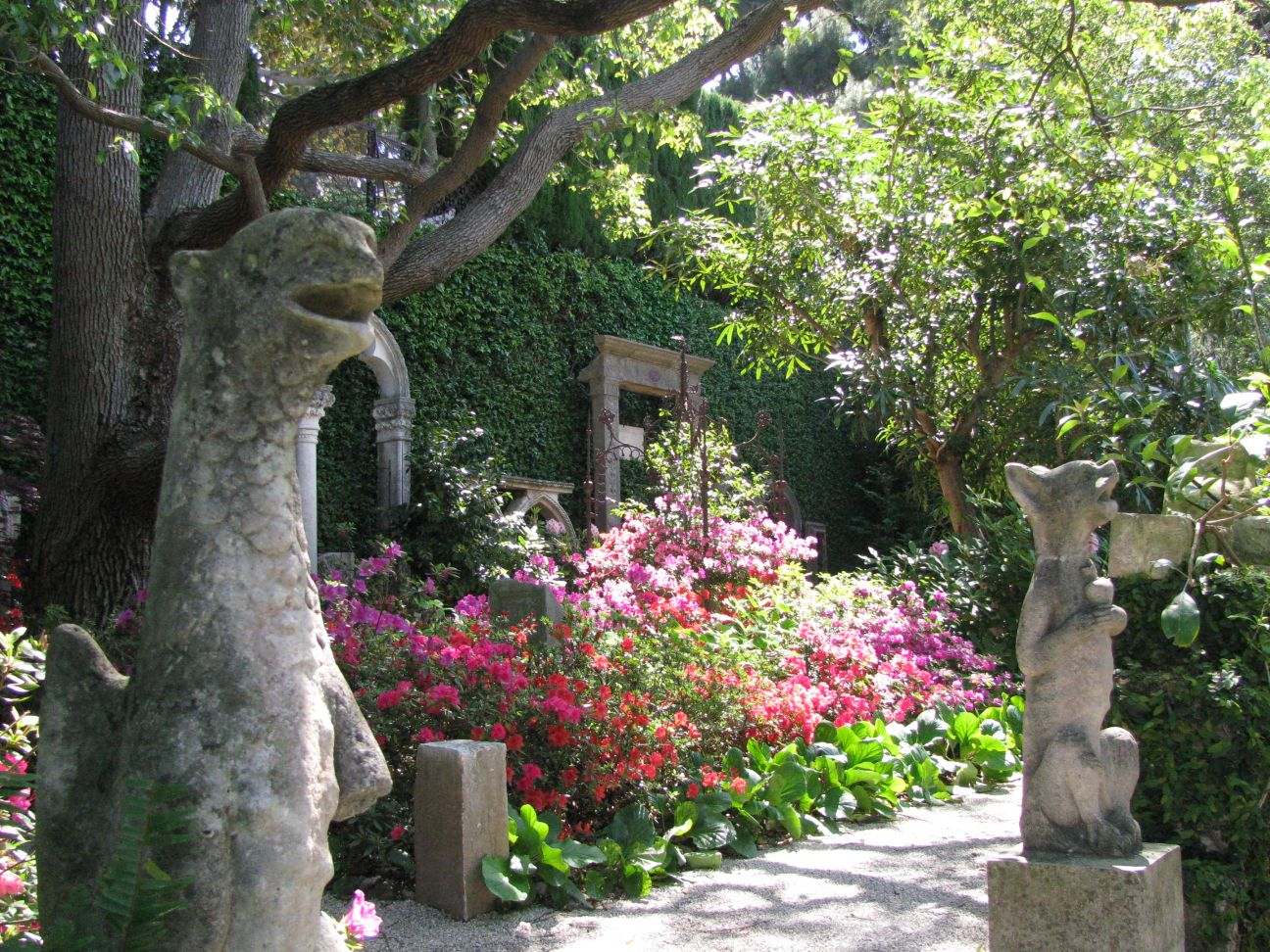
The stone garden

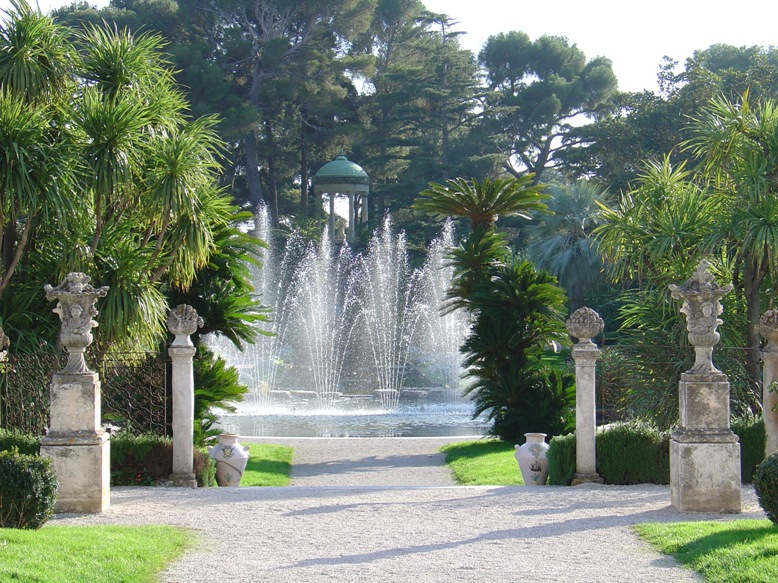
The fountains and the Temple of Love

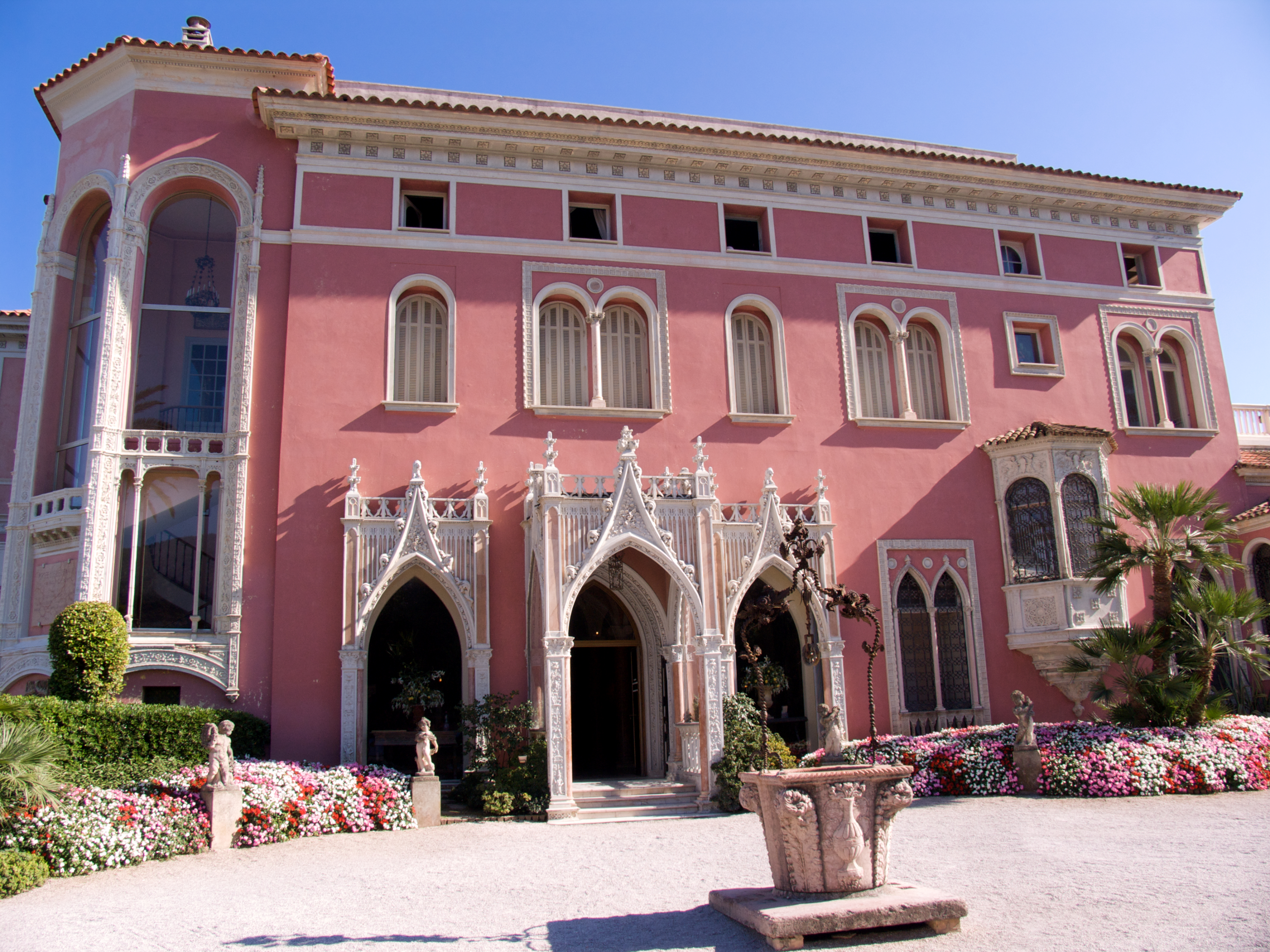
Entrance

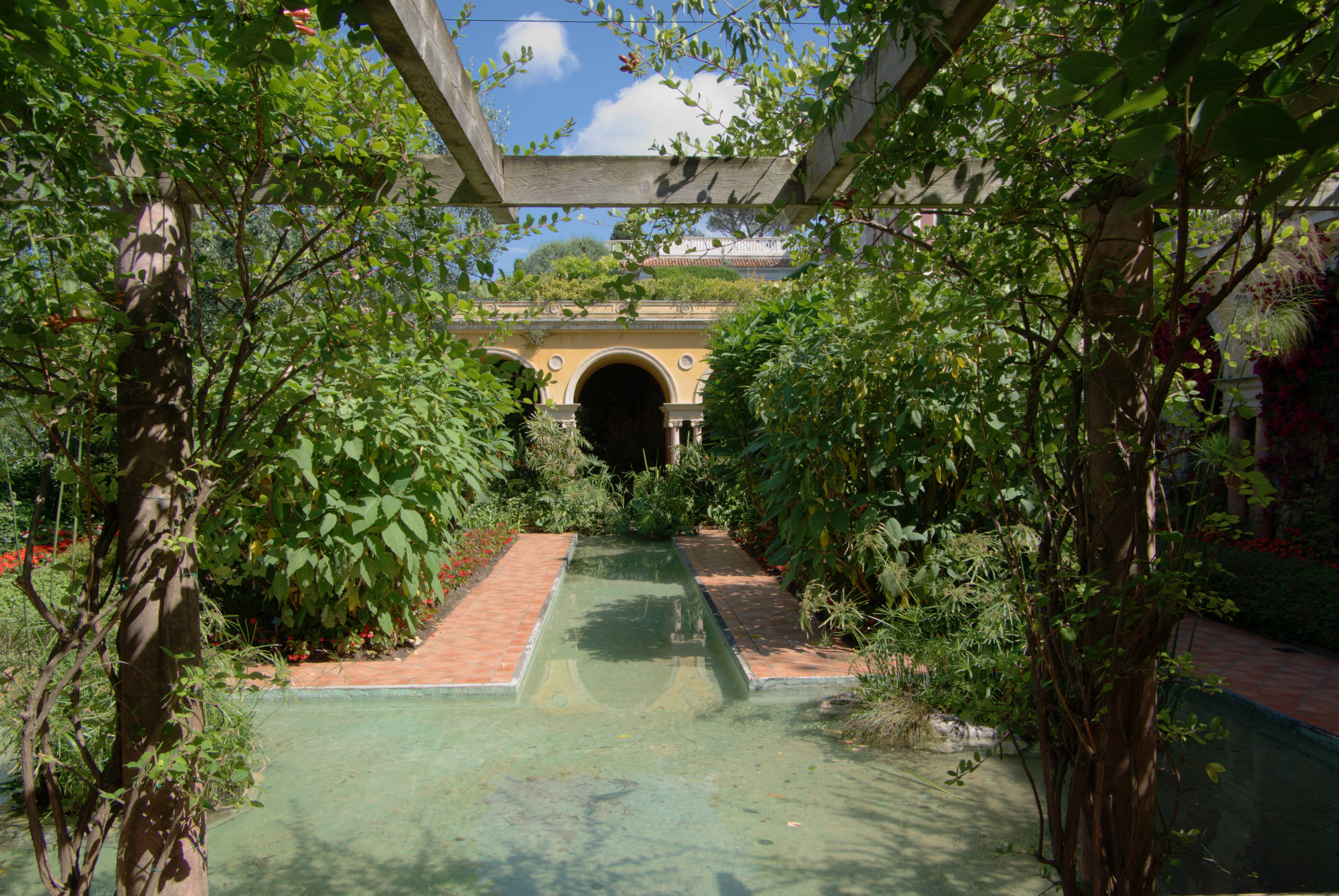
The Spanish garden

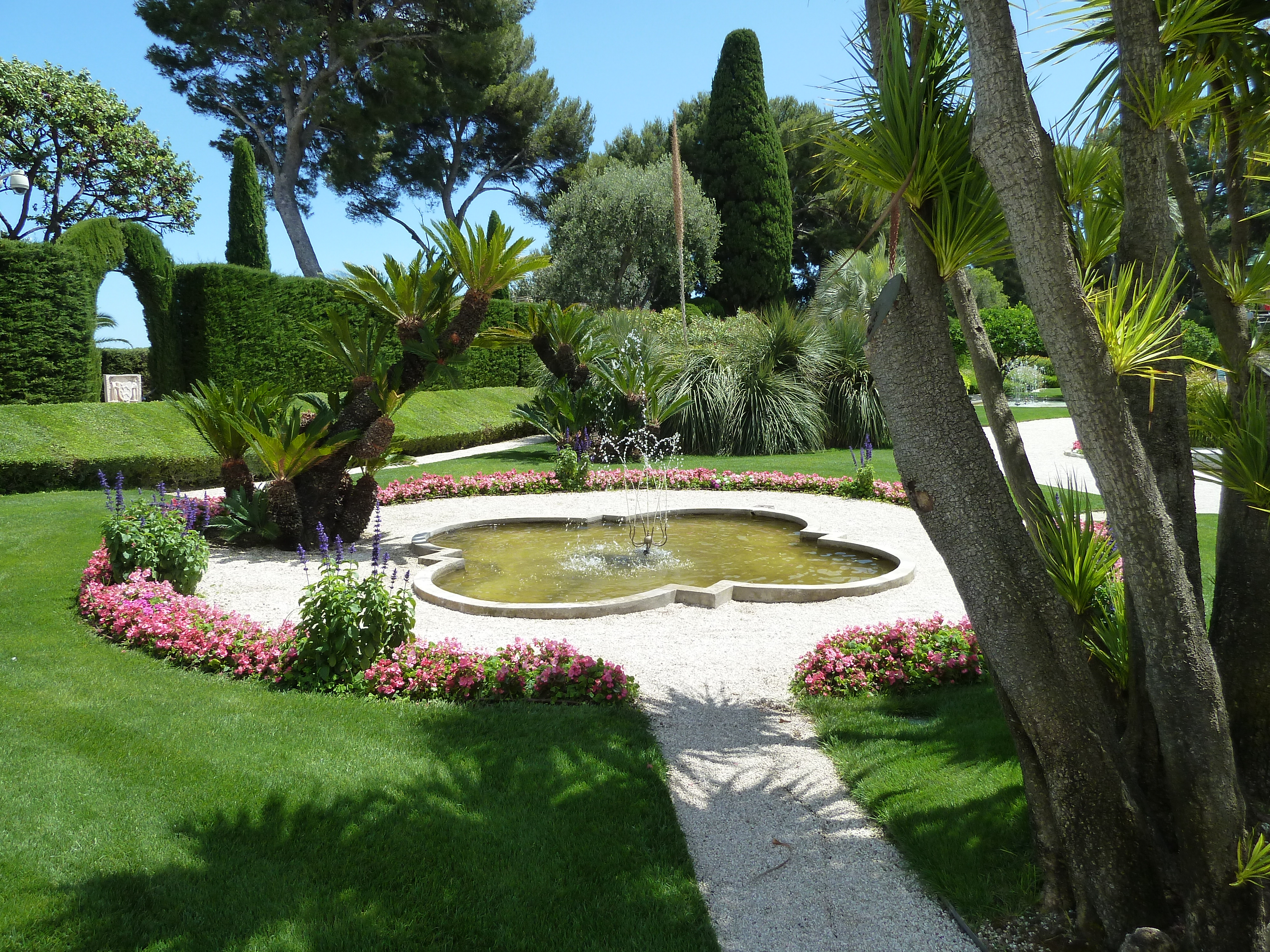
The formal garden

== See also ==
- Gardens of Provence-Alpes-Côte d'Azur
