= The Hare with Amber Eyes =

Book by Edmund de Waal

- Author: Edmund de Waal
- Subject: Ephrussi family
- Genre: Biography
- Publisher: Farrar, Straus and Giroux
- Publication date: 2010
- Pages: 353
- ISBN: 978-0-374-10597-6
- OCLC: 694399313

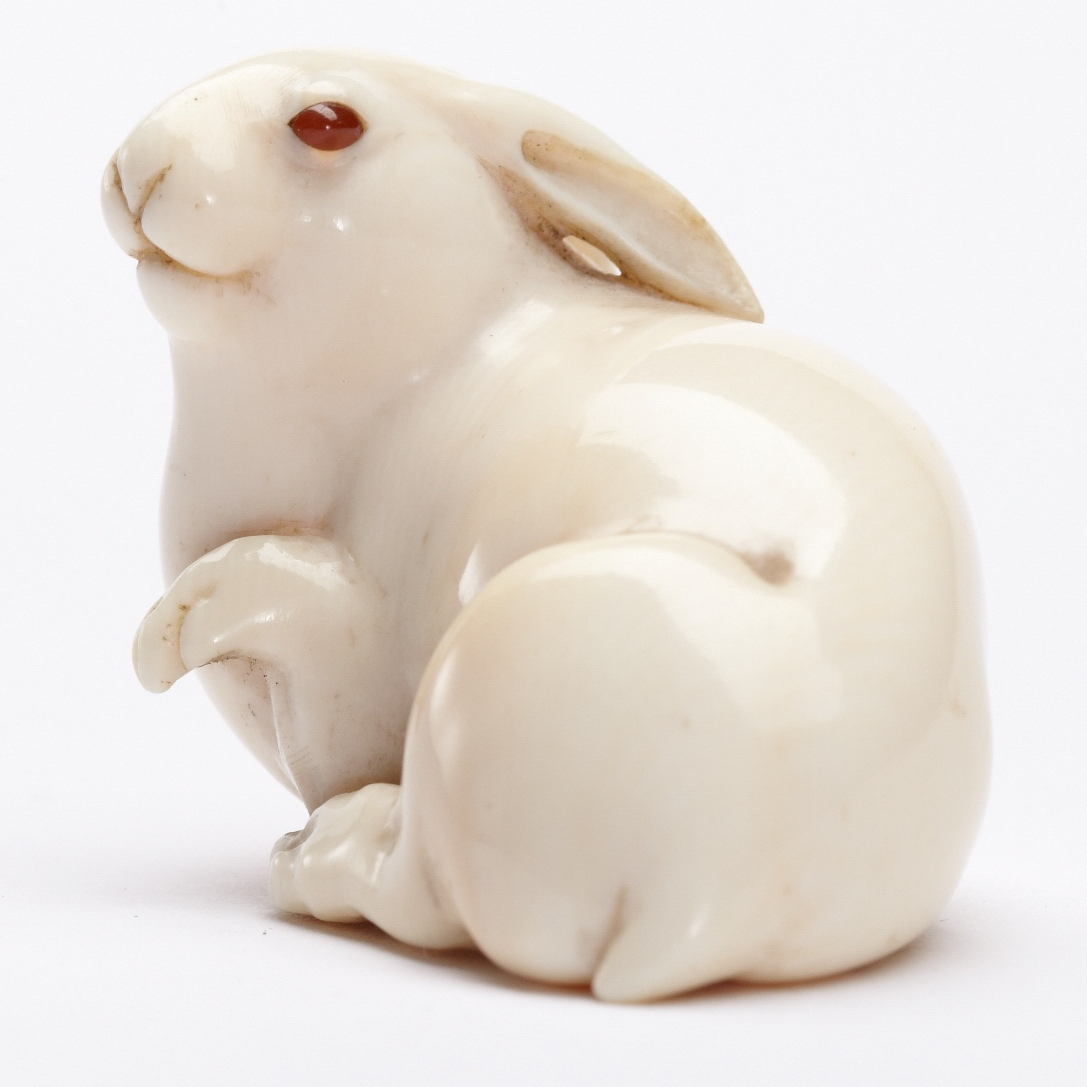
The Hare with Amber Eyes netsuke, at an exhibition in the Kunsthistorisches Museum Vienna, November 2016

The Hare with Amber Eyes: A Hidden Inheritance (2010) is a family memoir by British ceramicist Edmund de Waal. De Waal tells the story of his family, the Ephrussi, once a very wealthy European Jewish banking dynasty, centred in Odessa, Vienna and Paris, and peers of the Rothschild family. The Ephrussis lost almost everything in 1938 when the Nazis confiscated their property, and were unable to recover most of their property after the war, including priceless artwork; an easily hidden collection of 264 Japanese netsuke miniature sculptures was saved, tucked away inside a mattress by Anna, a loyal maid at Palais Ephrussi in Vienna during the war years. The collection has been passed down through five generations of the Ephrussi family, providing a common thread for the story of its fortunes from 1871 to 2009.

== Reception ==
The book was described by German literary scholar Oliver vom Hove as an “unprecedentedly precise memory book”. It was reviewed in The Washington Post by Michael Dirda, The Guardian by Rachel Cooke, The Economist, and The International Netsuke Society Journal.

In 2021, The Hare with Amber Eyes was distributed in Vienna as a free book, with a print run of 100,000 copies.

== Awards and honours ==
- 2010 The Economist, Books of the Year list
- 2010 Galaxy National Book Award, New Writer of the Year
- 2010 Costa Book Awards, winner (Biography)
- 2011 ALA Notable Book
- 2011 JQ Wingate Prize, shortlist
- 2011 Ondaatje Prize, winner

== Editions ==
- First UK edition: The Hare with Amber Eyes: A Hidden Inheritance, Chatto & Windus, Great Britain, 2010.
- First US edition: The Hare with Amber Eyes: A Family's Century of Art and Loss, Farrar, Straus and Giroux, New York, 2010. ISBN 978-0-374-10597-6
