= Briscoe =

Briscoe may refer to:

== Places ==
=== United Kingdom ===
- Briscoe, Cumbria, England

=== United States ===
- Briscoe, Missouri
- Briscoe, Texas
- Briscoe, West Virginia
- Briscoe County, Texas

== Other ==
- Briscoe (automotive company), defunct American automobile manufacturer
- Briscoe (surname)
- USS Briscoe (DD-977), U.S. Navy destroyer
- The Briscoe Brothers, professional wrestling team
- Briscoe Group, New Zealand retail chain

== See also ==
- Brisco (disambiguation)
- Bristow (disambiguation)
- Bristowe
