= Riscoe =

Riscoe is a surname. Notable people with the surname include:

- Arthur Riscoe (1895–1954), British stage and film actor
- Maureen Riscoe (1921–2003), British actress and casting director, daughter of Arthur

== See also ==
- Briscoe (surname)
- Risco (disambiguation)
- Roscoe (name)
