= Bristowe =

Bristowe may refer to:

- Ethel Bristowe (1862–1952), painter and author
- John Syer Bristowe (1827–1895), physician
- Kaitlyn Bristowe (born 1985), contestant
- Orme Bristowe (1895–1938). cricketer and golfer
- Samuel Bristowe (1822–1897), politician
- Thomas Bristowe (1833–1892), politician
- W. S. Bristowe (1901–1979), naturalist
- Wally Bristowe (1922–2013), footballer

== See also ==
- Briscoe (disambiguation)
- Bristow (disambiguation)
