= List of active United Kingdom military aircraft =

Active United Kingdom military aircraft directory

Tri-service badge of the United Kingdom's armed forces.

This is a list of military aircraft currently in service with the Armed Forces of the United Kingdom.

== Royal Air Force ==
Type	Origin	Class	Role	Introduced	In service	Total	Notes
Multi-Role Combat Aircraft
Eurofighter Typhoon	European (British, German, Italian, Spanish)	Jet	Multi-role	2003	111	125 (Note: Total inventory, including retired Tranche 1 aircraft used for spare parts and training.)	26 of 30 Tranche 1s have been retired as of 1 July 2025. The remaining Falklands-based Tranche 1s to be retired and replaced by four Tranche 2 aircraft in December 2027. The other 107 aircraft (67 Tranche 2; 40 Tranche 3) will remain in service until the 2040s.
Lockheed Martin F-35A Lightning	United States	Jet	Stealth Multi-role, including nuclear strike	Early 2030s	0 (Note: To be procured to provide tactical nuclear strike capability but with "day-to-day" training role)	0 (Note: To be based at RAF Marham)	12 F-35A to be procured in early 2030s; to support NATO nuclear mission and complement Royal Navy submarine-based nuclear forces.
Lockheed Martin F-35B Lightning	United States	Jet	Carrier-capable V/STOL Stealth Multi-role	2013	47 (Note: Includes the 4 used by No. 17(R) squadron based in the US listed below)	48 (Note: Includes 4 used by No. 17(R) squadron based in the US listed below; figures include one lost in November 2021)	Jointly operated with the Fleet Air Arm; 15 additional F-35B may be planned by 2033 but not confirmed in defence investment plan. These 47/48 aircraft here are also listed below in the "Fleet Air Arm" table, as they are used in co-operation with the Fleet Air Arm.
AEW&C
Boeing E-7 Wedgetail AEW.1	United States	Jet	AW&C	2026	2	0 (+3 on order)	Originally five envisaged, then reduced to three.
Reconnaissance / Maritime Patrol
Beechcraft Shadow R.1	United States	Propeller	ISTAR	2009	6	8	Originally expected OSD 2030. 2026 Defence Investment Plan indicated aircraft to be superseded by autonomous systems.
Boeing RC-135W Rivet Joint	United States	Jet	SIGINT	2013	3	3	Formally known as Airseeker.
Boeing P-8 Poseidon MRA.1	United States	Jet	ASW/Anti-ship	2019	9	9	
Tanker / Transport
Airbus Voyager	Airbus (European, Multinational)	Jet	Tanker / Transport	2011	14	14	
Transport
Boeing C-17A Globemaster III	United States	Jet	Transport	2001	8	8	
Airbus A400M Atlas C.1	Airbus (European, Multinational)	Propeller	Transport	2014	22	22	Final aircraft in initial batch delivered May 2023.
Dassault Envoy IV CC.1	France	Jet	Transport	2022	2	2	Two aircraft introduced in 2022. To be initially operated under civil contract until 2026.
Helicopters
Boeing Chinook	United States	Rotorcraft	Transport	1980	36	50	All HC.Mk 6A variants being withdrawn from service; 14 CH-47-ER variants being delivered from 2027; overall operational numbers to stabilize at c. 36 helicopters
AgustaWestland AW149	United Kingdom	Rotorcraft	Transport	From 2030	0	0 (+23 on order)	To replace former RAF Puma and Army Dauphin helicopters.
Airbus H145 Jupiter HC.2	European (Airbus Helicopters)	Rotorcraft	Transport	2025	3	3	Replaced former Puma HC2s & deployed with 84 Squadron on Cyprus from 2026; 3 additional helicopters acquired by the Army Air Corps.
Trainer aircraft
Airbus H135 Juno HT.1	European (Airbus Helicopters)	Rotorcraft	Trainer	2018	(Note: In service figures are not applicable for these aircraft which operate under availability contracts.)	29	Forms part of the UK Military Flying Training System listed below but operated by RAF.
Airbus H145 Jupiter HT.1	European (Airbus Helicopters)	Rotorcraft	Trainer	2018		7	Forms part of the UK Military Flying Training System listed below but operated by RAF.
BAE Systems Hawk T.2	United Kingdom	Jet	Jet trainer	2009	27	28	Forms part of the UK Military Flying Training System listed below but operated by No. IV (R) Squadron & No. XXV(F) Squadron; aircraft to remain in service until 2040.
Beechcraft Texan T1	United States	Propeller	Trainer	2018		14	Forms part of the UK Military Flying Training System listed below but operated by RAF.
Embraer Phenom T.1	Brazil	Jet	Trainer	2018		5	Forms part of the UK Military Flying Training System listed below but operated by RAF.
Grob Prefect T.1	Germany	Propeller	Trainer	2018		23	Forms part of the UK Military Flying Training System listed below but operated by RAF.
Grob Tutor T.1	Germany	Propeller	Trainer	1999		91 (Note: 91 Tutors in service across all Services of the UK Armed Forces.)	Used by the RAF Air Experience Flight. 28 Tutors have been sold to the Finnish Air Force as of 2018 and 3 lost due to air accidents in 2009.
Grob Viking T.1	Germany	Glider	Trainer	1990	52	81	The Grob Viking T1 is the RAF's primary aircraft for delivering basic glider and flight training to the RAF Air Cadets.
Medium-Altitude Long-Endurance UAVs
Protector RG1	United States	UAV	ISR / Attack	2023	10	10 (+6 on order)	16 ordered; 10 aircraft delivered as of June 2025 with 4 in the UK and the other 6 in the US where they are used for testing and training; total of 16 aircraft to be delivered by end 2025.

=== RAF Red Arrows ===
Type	Origin	Class	Role	Introduced	In service	Total	Notes
British Aerospace Hawk T.1	United Kingdom	Jet	Trainer	1980	10	10	Retired from aggressor role in March 2022; retained by the Red Arrows; to be retired by 2030.

=== RAF Battle of Britain Memorial Flight ===
Type	Origin	Class	Role	Introduced	In service	Total	Notes
Avro Lancaster (PA474)	United Kingdom	Propeller	Heavy bomber	1942	1	1	1 B.I
de Havilland Canada Chipmunk	United Kingdom	Propeller	Trainer	1946	2	2	2 T.10
Douglas Dakota	United States	Propeller	Transport	1942	1	1	1 C.3
Hawker Hurricane	United Kingdom	Propeller	Fighter	1937	2	2	2 Mk IIc
Supermarine Spitfire	United Kingdom	Propeller	Fighter	1938	5	6	1 Mk IIa, 1 Mk Vb, 1 LF Mk XVIe 2 PR Mk XIX

== Army Air Corps ==
Type	Origin	Class	Role	Introduced	In service	Total	Notes
Attack helicopters
Boeing AH-64E Apache Guardian	United States	Helicopter	Attack	2022	50	50	50 Apache AH1 remanufactured to AH-64E specification. Armed with M230 cannon and JAGM, Hellfire K1 and Hellfire Romeo missiles.
Reconnaissance helicopters
AgustaWestland Wildcat AH1	United Kingdom	Rotorcraft	Utility	2014	25	34	To be withdrawn from service from 2027; up to 8 helicopters serve with the Fleet Air Arm's 847 Squadron in support of the Royal Marines. These aircraft here are also listed below in the "Fleet Air Arm" table, as they are used in co-operation with the Fleet Air Arm.
Transport helicopters
Airbus H145 Jupiter HC.2	European (Airbus Helicopters)	Rotorcraft	Transport	2025	3	3	Replacing former Puma HC2s deployed with British Forces Brunei; three additional aircraft acquired by the Royal Air Force.
Eurocopter AS365 Dauphin II	France	Rotorcraft	United Kingdom Special Forces	2009	5	5	ZJ780, ZJ782, ZJ783; ZJ785; ZJ787 These are the helicopters of the No. 658 Squadron AAC (Army Air Corps).

== Fleet Air Arm ==
Type	Origin	Class	Role	Introduced	In service	Total	Notes
Combat aircraft
Lockheed Martin F-35B Lightning	United States	Jet	Carrier-capable V/STOL Stealth Multi-role	2013	47	48	Jointly operated with Royal Air Force. Initial Operational Capability (Maritime) in 2020; 809 Naval Air Squadron stood up in December 2023. These 47/48 aircraft here are also listed above in the "Royal Air Force" table, as they are used in co-operation with the Royal Air Force.
Attack/Reconnaissance helicopters
AgustaWestland AW159 Wildcat HMA2	United Kingdom	Rotorcraft	Attack	2014	22	28	Planned for withdrawal by 2035 and be superseded by future autonomous aircraft.
AgustaWestland AW101 Merlin HM2	United Kingdom	Rotorcraft	ASW/AEW	2000	23	30	Expected OSD 2040.
AgustaWestland AW159 Wildcat AH1	United Kingdom	Rotorcraft	Utility/Reconnaissance	2014	25	34	Up to 8 Army Air Corps aircraft tasked to 847 Naval Air Squadron in support of the Royal Marines; future with 847 NAS unclear once withdrawn from army service. These aircraft here are also listed above in the "Army Air Corps" table, as they are used in co-operation with the Army Air Corps.
Transport helicopters
AgustaWestland AW101 Merlin Mk4/4A	United Kingdom	Rotorcraft	Transport	2000	21	29	One aircraft crashed September 2024, second in June 2026; Expected OSD 2040.
Trainer aircraft
Grob Tutor	Germany	Propeller	Trainer	1999	5	5	Introductory fight training; operated by 727 Naval Air Squadron. These aircraft here are also listed above in the "Royal Air Force" table, as the Tutor is used by Royal Air Force and Fleet Air Arm.
Tactical vertical takeoff/landing UAV
Peregrine	Austria	Rotorcraft UAV	ISR	2024	2	2	Formerly deployed on HMS Lancaster; future tasking unclear.

== Ministry of Defence ==
As well as the military services, a number of defence contractors operate military aircraft on behalf of or lease them from the Ministry of Defence.

Type	Origin	Class	Role	Introduced	In service	Total	Notes
Agusta AW109	Italy	Rotorcraft	Utility		1	1	QinetiQ, Boscombe Down.
Eurocopter AS365 Dauphin II	France	Rotorcraft	Utility	1999	2	2	Used as transport of instructors as part of FOST training. Operated by Bristow under MRCOA (Note: Military Registered Civil Owned Aircraft). Retired 31st March 2026.
Eurocopter AS350 Écureuil	France	Rotorcraft	Trainer		3	3	Cobham Helicopter Academy, Newquay under CFAOS (Note: leased from the Ministry of Defence and operated on the military register under the Contractor Flying Approved Organisation Scheme (CFAOS)).
Eurofighter Typhoon	United Kingdom	Jet	Multi-role		3	3	BAE Systems, Warton (Note: IPA 1, IPA 5, IPA 6).
Hawker Hunter	UK	Jet	Fighter		3	3	Hawker Hunter Aviation, RAF Leeming.
Lockheed Martin F-35B Lightning II	United States	Jet	Multi-role	2013	-	-	4 of 47 F-35Bs operated in the United States by 17 Squadron RAF; test and evaluation role.
Westland Sea King	United Kingdom	Rotorcraft	Trainer		2	2	HeliOperations under CFAOS (Note: leased from the Ministry of Defence and operated on the military register under the Contractor Flying Approved Organisation Scheme (CFAOS)).
Airbus Zephyr	United Kingdom	High-altitude pseudo-satellite	UAV		0	3	Solar-powered long-endurance UAV; observation and communications platform; two of three aircraft in storage; MoD has not been a participant in any flights since 2021

== UK Military Flying Training System ==
Type	Origin	Class	Role	Introduced	In service	Total	Notes
Grob Prefect T.1	Germany	Propeller	Trainer	2018		23	Serves with 57 Squadron RAF, 703 Naval Air Squadron and 674 Squadron, Army Air Corps.
Beechcraft Texan T.1	United States	Propeller	Trainer	2018		14	Serves with 72 Squadron RAF.
Beechcraft Avenger	United States	Propeller	Trainer	2011	2	4	Serves with 750 Naval Air Squadron.
Embraer Phenom T.1	Brazil	Jet	Trainer	2018		5	Serves with 45 Squadron RAF.
BAE Systems Hawk T.2	United Kingdom	Jet	Jet trainer	2009	28	28	Serves with No. IV (R) Squadron & No. XXV(F) Squadron.
Airbus H135 Juno HT.1	European (Airbus Helicopters)	Rotorcraft	Trainer	2018		29	Serves with 60 and 202 Squadrons RAF, 705 Naval Air Squadron and 660 Squadron, Army Air Corps.
Airbus H145 Jupiter HT.1	European (Airbus Helicopters)	Rotorcraft	Trainer	2018		7	Serves with 60 and 202 Squadrons RAF.

== UAVs and drones ==
Drone Wars UK, a British NGO which investigates the impact of drone warfare, has stated that as of 2025 transparency about the use of unmanned aerial vehicles (UAV) within the British military is limited, that Freedom of Information requests about UAVs are regularly refused on national security grounds, and that MOD ministers have refused to answer parliamentary questions on the basis that the use of UAVs is now an intelligence matter. In 2025, Drone Wars UK drew up a list of 20 known UK military uncrewed systems and 20 known current UK programmes to develop UAV capabilities.

== See also ==
- British Armed Forces
- List of aircraft of the Royal Air Force
- Future of the Royal Air Force
- New Medium Helicopter
