= Bristo (disambiguation) =

Bristo is a small area of Edinburgh, Scotland, half a mile south of the city centre, which includes Bristo Square, Bristo Lane and Bristo Port (a cul-de-sac), as well as being a surname.

== Articles about Edinburgh ==
- Bristo Square, a public space
- Bristo Church, a former church in the area

== People ==
- Braden Bristo (born 1994), American baseball player
- Marca Bristo (1953–2019), American disability rights activist
- Bristo W. Reese (active 1873–1875), state legislator in Alabama

== See also ==
- Bristow (disambiguation)
