= Briscoe (surname) =

Briscoe is a surname. Notable people with the surname include:

- Anne Briscoe, American biochemist
- Ben Briscoe (1934–2023), Irish politician, son of Robert
- Brent Briscoe (1961–2017), American actor and screenwriter
- Chase Briscoe, American race car driver
- Constance Briscoe, British barrister and author
- Dolph Briscoe (1923-2010), Governor of Texas, 1973-1979
- Dezmon Briscoe, American football wide receiver
- James Briscoe (1923–2014), Football (soccer) manager
- Jay Briscoe (1984–2023), ring name of American wrestler Jamin "Jay" Pugh
- Jill Briscoe, speaker, author, magazine head and wife of Stuart
- John Briscoe (disambiguation), any of several people by that name
- Lottie Briscoe, stage and silent film actress
- Mark Briscoe (born 1985), ring name of American wrestler Mark Pugh
- Marlin Briscoe (1945–2022), American football player
- Nicole Briscoe, American sports reporter, Miss Illinois Teen USA
- Paul Briscoe (1930–2010), English school teacher and writer, known for spending much of his childhood in Nazi Germany
- Robert Briscoe (disambiguation), any of several people by that name
- Ryan Briscoe, Australian race car driver
- Stuart Briscoe, evangelist, pastor, author and speaker
- Ted Briscoe, Australian rugby player
- Thomas Briscoe, Welsh priest and scholar
- Tom Briscoe, English rugby player

== Fictional ==
- Lennie Briscoe, a character from the Law & Order television franchise
- Lily Briscoe, a central character in Virginia Woolf's To the Lighthouse
