= Boeing C-17 Globemaster III =

American four engine military transport aircraft

C-17 Globemaster III
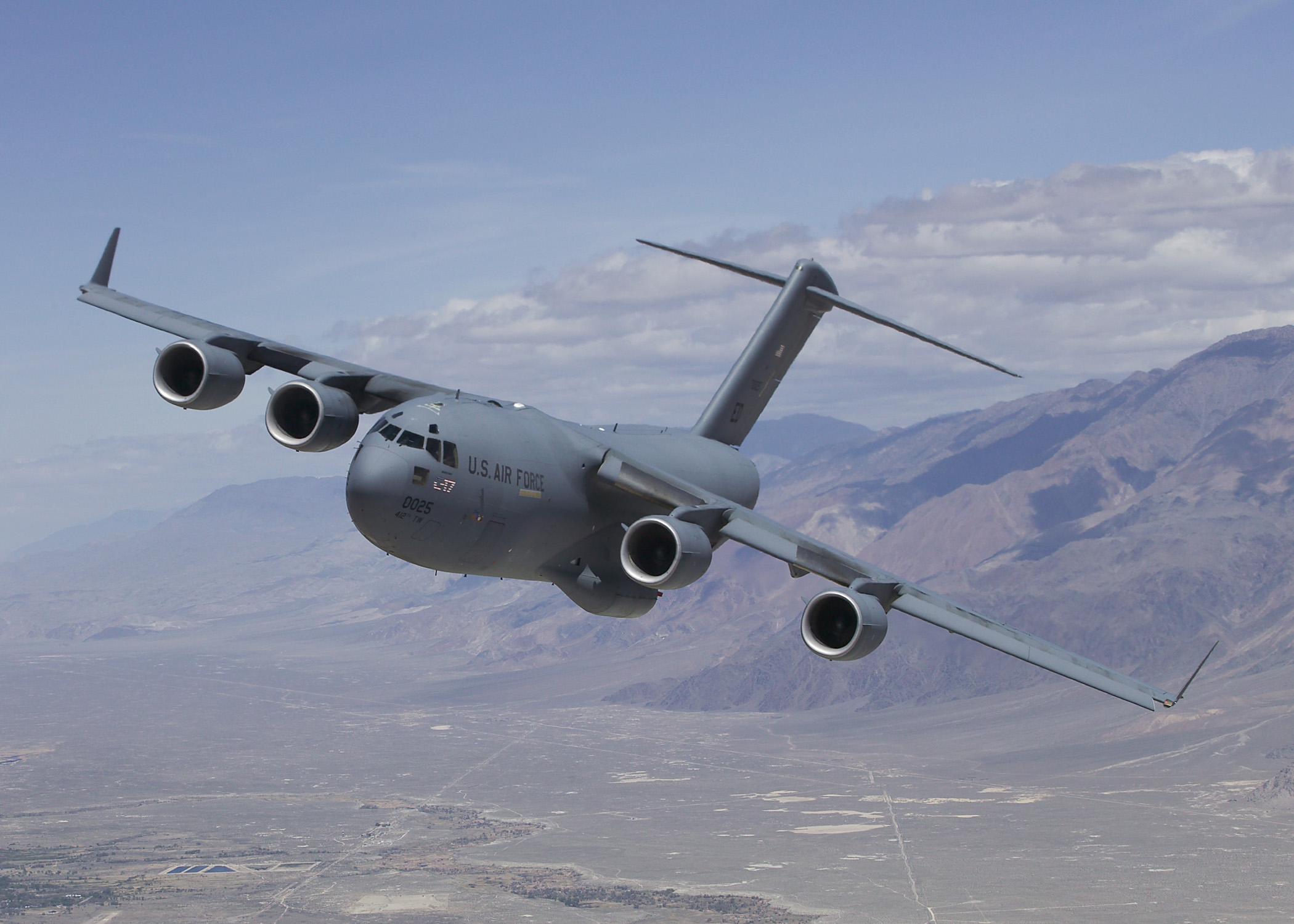
- The prototype C-17, known as T-1, on a test flight in 2007

General information
- Type: Strategic and tactical airlifter
- National origin: United States
- Manufacturer: McDonnell Douglas / Boeing
- Status: In service
- Primary users: United States Air Force Indian Air Force; Royal Air Force; Royal Australian Air Force
- Number built: 279

History
- Manufactured: 1991–2015
- Introduction date: 17 January 1995
- First flight: 15 September 1991
- Developed from: McDonnell Douglas YC-15

The McDonnell Douglas/Boeing C-17 Globemaster III is a large military transport aircraft developed for the United States Air Force (USAF) during the 1980s and the early 1990s by McDonnell Douglas. The C-17 carries forward the name of two previous piston-engined military cargo aircraft, the Douglas C-74 Globemaster and the Douglas C-124 Globemaster II.

The C-17 is based upon the YC-15, a smaller prototype airlifter designed during the 1970s. It was designed to replace the Lockheed C-141 Starlifter, and also fulfill some of the duties of the Lockheed C-5 Galaxy. The redesigned airlifter differs from the YC-15 in that it is larger and has swept wings and more powerful engines. Development was protracted by a series of design issues, causing the company to incur a loss of nearly US$1.5 billion on the program's development phase. On 15 September 1991, roughly one year behind schedule, the first C-17 performed its maiden flight. The C-17 formally entered USAF service on 17 January 1995. McDonnell Douglas and later Boeing after it merged with McDonnell Douglas in 1997, manufactured the C-17 for more than two decades. The final C-17 was completed at the Long Beach, California, plant and flown in November 2015.

The C-17 commonly performs tactical and strategic airlift missions, transporting troops and cargo throughout the world; additional roles include medical evacuation and airdrop duties. The transport is in service with the U.S. Air Force along with the air forces of India, the United Kingdom, Australia, Canada, Qatar, the United Arab Emirates, Kuwait, and the Europe-based multilateral organization Heavy Airlift Wing.

The aircraft played a key logistical role during both Operation Enduring Freedom in Afghanistan and Operation Iraqi Freedom in Iraq, as well as in providing humanitarian aid in the aftermath of various natural disasters, including the 2010 Haiti earthquake, the 2011 Sindh floods and the 2023 Turkey–Syria earthquakes.

== Development ==
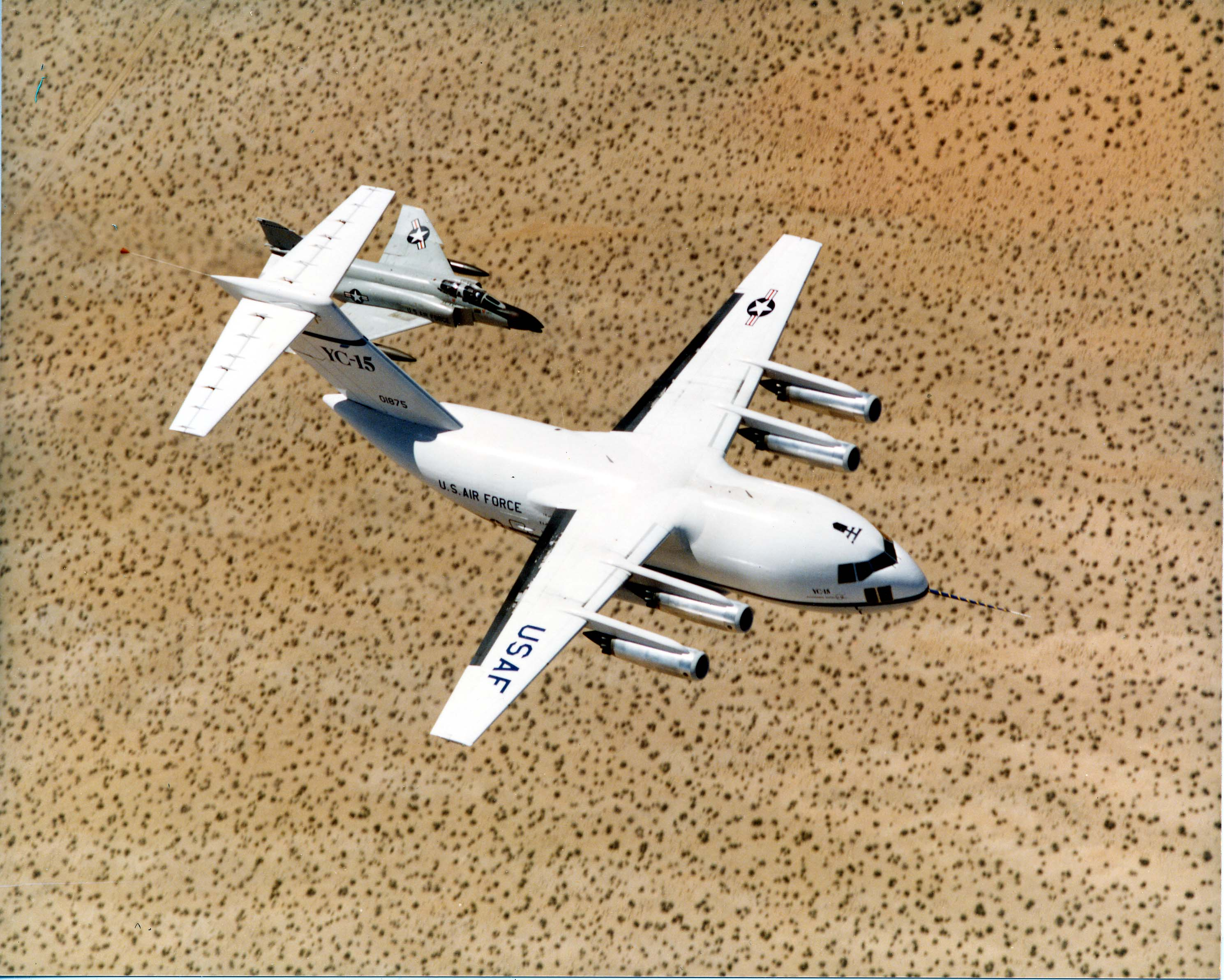
The McDonnell Douglas YC-15 design was used as the basis for the C-17.

=== Background and design phase ===
In the 1970s, the U.S. Air Force began looking for a replacement for its Lockheed C-130 Hercules tactical cargo aircraft. The Advanced Medium STOL Transport (AMST) competition was held, with Boeing proposing the YC-14, and McDonnell Douglas proposing the YC-15. Though both entrants exceeded specified requirements, the AMST competition was canceled before a winner was selected. The USAF started the C-X program in November 1979 to develop a larger AMST with longer range to augment its strategic airlift.

By 1980, the USAF had a large fleet of aging C-141 Starlifter cargo aircraft. Compounding matters, increased strategic airlift capabilities were needed to fulfill its rapid-deployment airlift requirements. The USAF set mission requirements and released a request for proposals (RFP) for C-X in October 1980. McDonnell Douglas chose to develop a new aircraft based on the YC-15. Boeing bid an enlarged three-engine version of its AMST YC-14. Lockheed submitted both a C-5-based design and an enlarged C-141 design. On 28 August 1981, McDonnell Douglas was chosen to build its proposal, then designated C-17. Compared to the YC-15, the new aircraft differed in having swept wings, increased size, and more powerful engines. This would allow it to perform the work done by the C-141, and to fulfill some of the duties of the Lockheed C-5 Galaxy, freeing the C-5 fleet for outsize cargo.

Alternative proposals were pursued to fill airlift needs after the C-X contest. These were lengthening of C-141As into C-141Bs, ordering more C-5s, continued purchases of KC-10s, and expansion of the Civil Reserve Air Fleet. Limited budgets reduced program funding, requiring a delay of four years. During this time contracts were awarded for preliminary design work and for the completion of engine certification. In December 1985, a full-scale development contract was awarded, under Program Manager Bob Clepper. At this time, first flight was planned for 1990. The USAF had formed a requirement for 210 aircraft.

Development problems and limited funding caused delays in the late 1980s. Criticisms were made of the developing aircraft and questions were raised about more cost-effective alternatives during this time. In April 1990, Secretary of Defense Dick Cheney reduced the order from 210 to 120 aircraft. The maiden flight of the C-17 took place on 15 September 1991 from the McDonnell Douglas's plant in Long Beach, California, about a year behind schedule. The first aircraft (T-1) and five more production models (P1-P5) participated in extensive flight testing and evaluation at Edwards Air Force Base. Two complete airframes were built for static and repeated load testing.

=== Development difficulties ===
A static test of the C-17 wing in October 1992 resulted in its failure at 128% of design limit load, below the 150% requirement. Both wings buckled rear to the front and failures occurred in stringers, spars, and ribs. Some $100 million was spent to redesign the wing structure; the wing failed at 145% during a second test in September 1993. A review of the test data, however, showed that the wing was not loaded correctly and did indeed meet the requirement. The C-17 received the "Globemaster III" name in early 1993. In late 1993, the U.S. Department of Defense (DoD) gave the contractor two years to solve production issues and cost overruns or face the contract's termination after the delivery of the 40th aircraft. By accepting the 1993 terms, McDonnell Douglas incurred a loss of nearly US$1.5 billion on the program's development phase.

In March 1994, the Non-Developmental Airlift Aircraft program was established to procure a transport aircraft using commercial practices as a possible alternative or supplement to the C-17. Initial material solutions considered included: buy a modified Boeing 747-400 NDAA, restart the C-5 production line, extend the C-141 service life, and continue C-17 production. The field eventually narrowed to: the Boeing 747-400 (provisionally named the C-33), the Lockheed Martin C-5D, and the McDonnell Douglas C-17. The NDAA program was initiated after the C-17 program was temporarily capped at a 40-aircraft buy (in December 1993) pending further evaluation of C-17 cost and performance and an assessment of commercial airlift alternatives.

In April 1994, the program remained over budget and did not meet weight, fuel burn, payload, and range specifications. It failed several key criteria during airworthiness evaluation tests. Problems were found with the mission software, landing gear, and other areas. In May 1994, it was proposed to cut production to as few as 32 aircraft; these cuts were later rescinded. A July 1994 Government Accountability Office (GAO) report revealed that USAF and DoD studies from 1986 and 1991 stated the C-17 could use 6,400 more runways outside the U.S. than the C-5, but these studies had only considered runway dimensions, but not runway strength or load classification numbers (LCN). The C-5 has a lower LCN, but the USAF classifies both in the same broad load classification group. When considering runway dimensions and load ratings, the C-17's worldwide runway advantage over the C-5 shrank from 6,400 to 911 airfields. The report also stated "current military doctrine that does not reflect the use of small, austere airfields", thus the C-17's short field capability was not considered.

A January 1995 GAO report stated that the USAF originally planned to order 210 C-17s at a cost of $41.8 billion, and that the 120 aircraft on order were to cost $39.5 billion based on a 1992 estimate. In March 1994, the U.S. Army decided it did not need the 60,000 lb (27,000 kg) low-altitude parachute-extraction system delivery with the C-17 and that the C-130's 42,000 lb (19,000 kg) capability was sufficient. C-17 testing was limited to this lower weight. Airflow issues prevented the C-17 from meeting airdrop requirements. A February 1997 GAO report revealed that a C-17 with a full payload could not land on 3,000 ft (914 m) wet runways; simulations suggested a distance of 5,000 ft (1,500 m) was required. The YC-15 was transferred to AMARC to be made flightworthy again for further flight tests for the C-17 program in March 1997.

By September 1995, most of the prior issues were reportedly resolved and the C-17 was meeting all performance and reliability targets. The first USAF squadron was declared operational in January 1995.

=== Production and deliveries ===
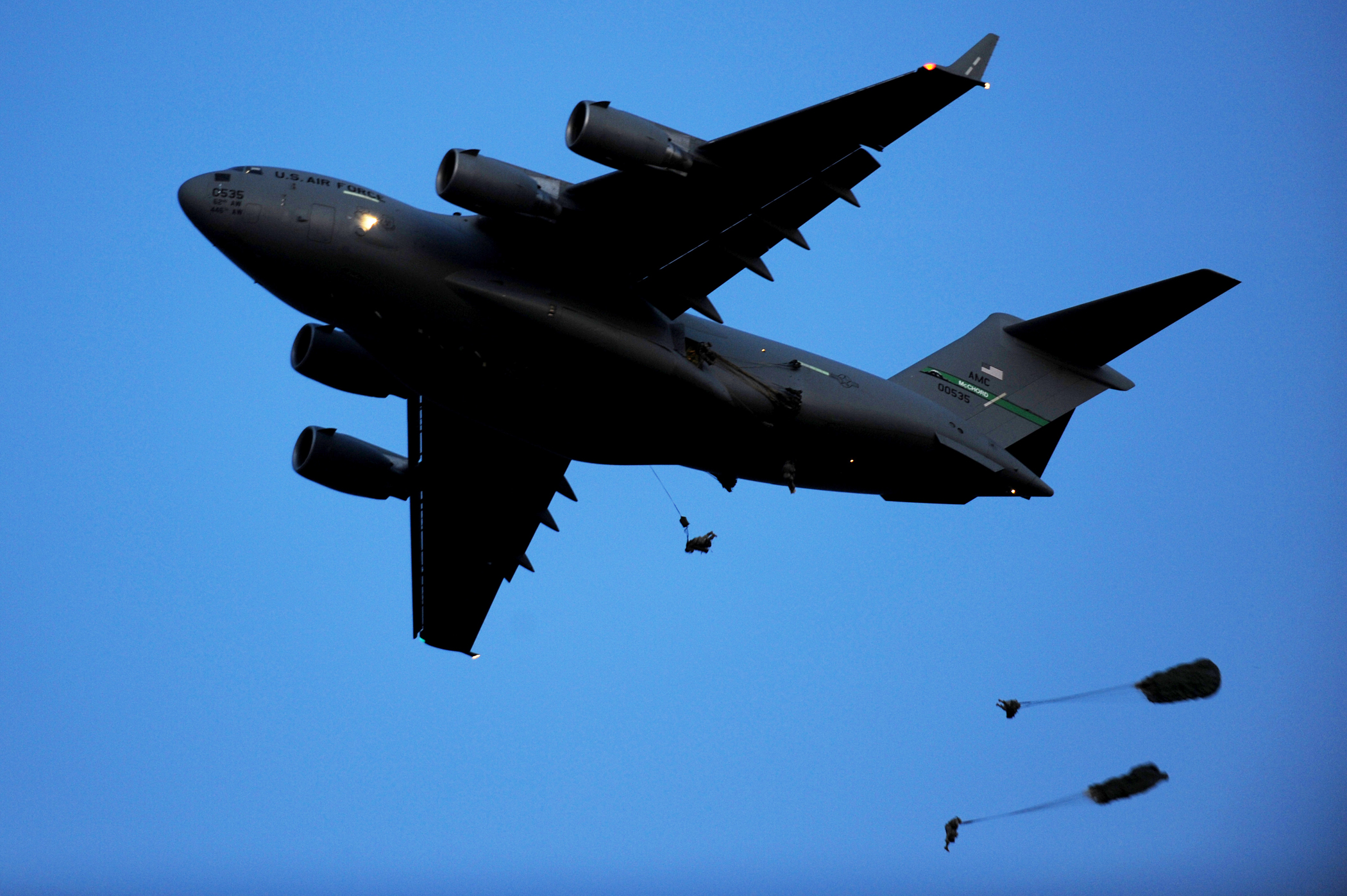
Paratroopers dropping from a C-17 during a training exercise in 2010

In 1996, the U.S. DoD ordered another 80 aircraft for a total of 120. In 1997, McDonnell Douglas merged with domestic competitor Boeing. In April 1999, Boeing offered to cut the C-17's unit price if the USAF bought 60 more; in August 2002, the order was increased to 180 aircraft. In 2007, 190 C-17s were on order for the USAF. On 6 February 2009, Boeing was awarded a $2.95 billion contract for 15 additional C-17s, increasing the total USAF fleet to 205 and extending production from August 2009 to August 2010. On 6 April 2009, U.S. Secretary of Defense Robert Gates stated that there would be no more C-17s ordered beyond the 205 planned. However, on 12 June 2009, the House Armed Services Air and Land Forces Subcommittee added a further 17 C-17s.

Debate arose over follow-on C-17 orders, the USAF requested line shutdown while Congress called for further production. In FY2007, the USAF requested $1.6 billion (~$2.39 billion in 2025) in response to "excessive combat use" on the C-17 fleet. In 2008, USAF General Arthur Lichte, Commander of Air Mobility Command, indicated before a House of Representatives subcommittee on air and land forces a need to extend production to another 15 aircraft to increase the total to 205, and that C-17 production may continue to satisfy airlift requirements. The USAF finally decided to cap its C-17 fleet at 223 aircraft; the final delivery was on 12 September 2013.

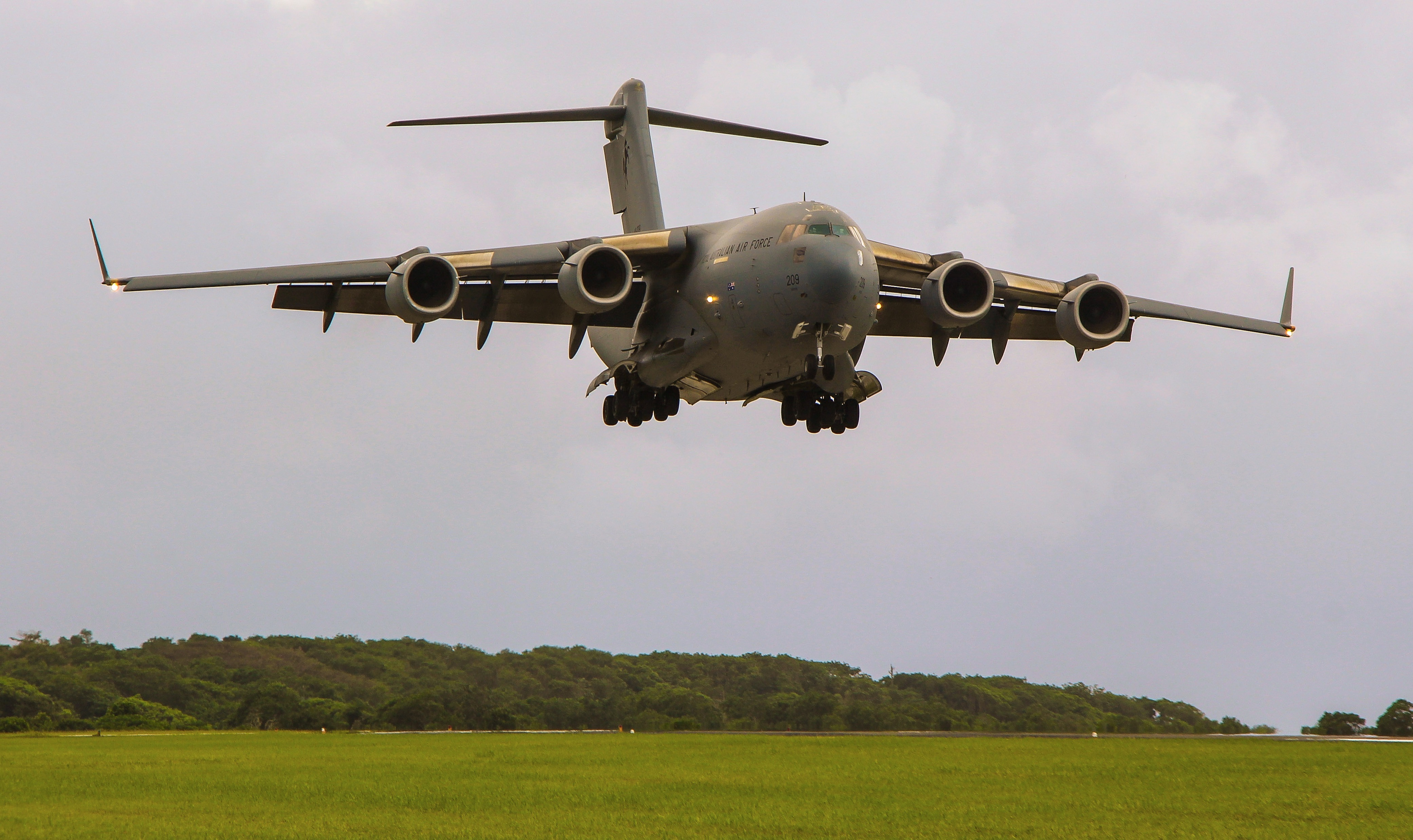
A Royal Australian Air Force C-17 on final approach at Christmas Island Airport in 2016

In 2010, Boeing reduced the production rate to 10 aircraft per year from a high of 16 per year, due to dwindling orders and to extend the production line's life while additional orders were sought. The workforce was reduced by about 1,100 through 2012, a second shift at the Long Beach plant was also eliminated. By April 2011, 230 production C-17s had been delivered, including 210 to the USAF. The C-17 prototype "T-1" was retired in 2012 after use as a testbed by the USAF. In January 2010, the USAF announced the end of Boeing's performance-based logistics contracts to maintain the type. On 19 June 2012, the USAF ordered its 224th and final C-17 to replace one that crashed in Alaska in July 2010.

In September 2013, Boeing announced that C-17 production was starting to close down. In October 2014, the main wing spar of the 279th and last aircraft was completed; this C-17 was delivered in 2015, after which Boeing closed the Long Beach plant. Production of spare components was to continue until at least 2017. The C-17 is projected to be in service for several decades. In February 2014, Boeing was engaged in sales talks with "five or six" countries for the remaining 15 C-17s; thus Boeing decided to build ten aircraft without confirmed buyers in anticipation of future purchases.

In May 2015, The Wall Street Journal reported that Boeing expected to book a charge of under $100 million and cut 3,000 positions associated with the C-17 program, and also suggested that Airbus' lower cost A400M Atlas took international sales away from the C-17.

In June 2025, it was announced that Boeing was in talks with an international customer to restart the production of C-17s, and that several other countries were interested in the prospect. There is speculation that the United States may be interested in buying new C-17s, as there is currently no replacement planned for existing C-17s or the aging C-5 Galaxy. Japanese Prime Minister Shigeru Ishiba stated that the Japanese Air Self-Defense Force would be interested in acquiring C-17s.

C-17 yearly deliveries
1991	1992	1993	1994	1995	1996	1997	1998	1999	2000	2001	2002	2003	2004	2005	2006	2007	2008	2009	2010	2011	2012	2013	2014	2015	2016	2017	2018	2019
1	4	5	8	6	6	7	10	11	13	14	16	16	16	16	16	16	16	16	14	12	10	10	7	5	4	0	0	1

=== Replacement plans ===
The USAF plans to replace its fleet of C-17 Globemaster III and C-5M Galaxy with a new fleet of heavy airlifters called the Next-Generation Airlifter (NGAL) due to concerns of the airframes becoming obsolete. Procurement is planned to start in 2038. The goal of the new program is to be a "two-for-one". "When I say two-for-one, we're probably going to procure one aircraft," Air Force General John Lamontagne, former head of Air Mobility Command, further clarified. "We won't get a C-5 replacement and a C-17 replacement. There'll be one airplane that does strategic airlift." and "As far as what we want in the next generation airlift platform, we want agility, we want speed, we want to be able to operate in a higher threat environment", said General John Lamontagne due to growing concern from China's activity in developing and fielding new air-to-air and surface-to-air missiles. It is currently expected to reach initial operational capability by 2041, anticipating an acquisition rate of 7.4 aircraft per year. However, current projections indicate that both the C-5M and C-17s are expected to remain in service until 2045 and 2075, respectively.

== Design ==
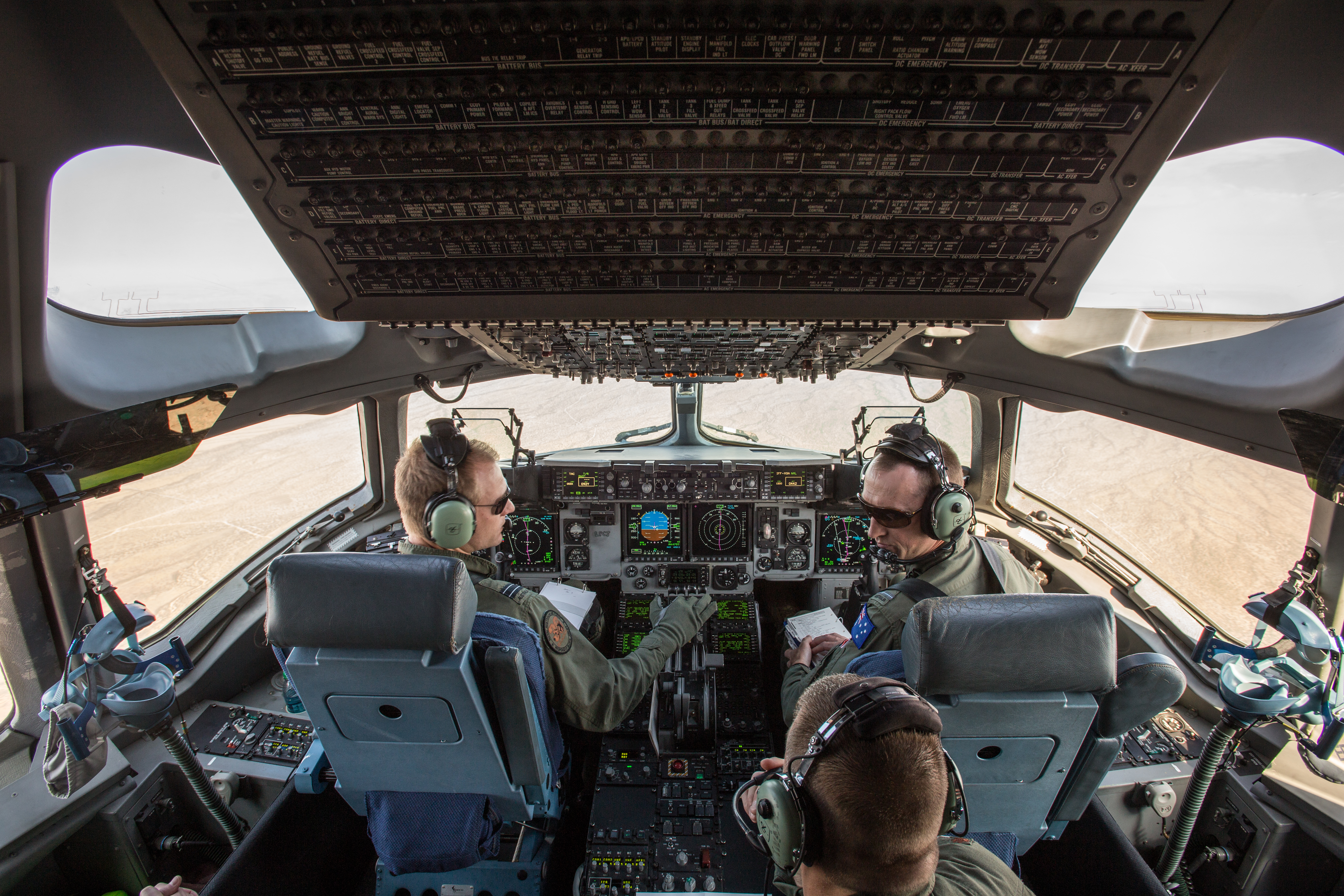
Cockpit of a C-17

The C-17 Globemaster III is a strategic transport aircraft, able to airlift cargo close to a battle area. The size and weight of U.S. mechanized firepower and equipment have grown in recent decades from increased air mobility requirements, particularly for large or heavy non-palletized outsize cargo. It has a length of 174 feet (53 m) and a wingspan of 169 feet 10 inches (51.77 m), and uses about 8% composite materials, mostly in secondary structure and control surfaces. The aircraft features an anhedral wing configuration, providing pitch and roll stability to the aircraft. The aircraft's stability is furthered by its T-tail design, raising the center of pressure even higher above the center of mass. Drag is also lowered, as the horizontal stabilizer is far removed from the vortices generated by the two wings of the aircraft.

The C-17 is powered by four Pratt & Whitney F117-PW-100 turbofan engines, which are based on the commercial Pratt & Whitney PW2040 used on the Boeing 757. Each engine is rated at 40,400 lbf (180 kN) of thrust. The engine's thrust reversers direct engine exhaust air upwards and forward, reducing the chances of foreign object damage by ingestion of runway debris, and providing enough reverse thrust to back up the aircraft while taxiing. The thrust reversers can also be used in flight at idle-reverse for added drag in maximum-rate descents. In vortex surfing tests performed by two C-17s, up to 10% fuel savings were reported.

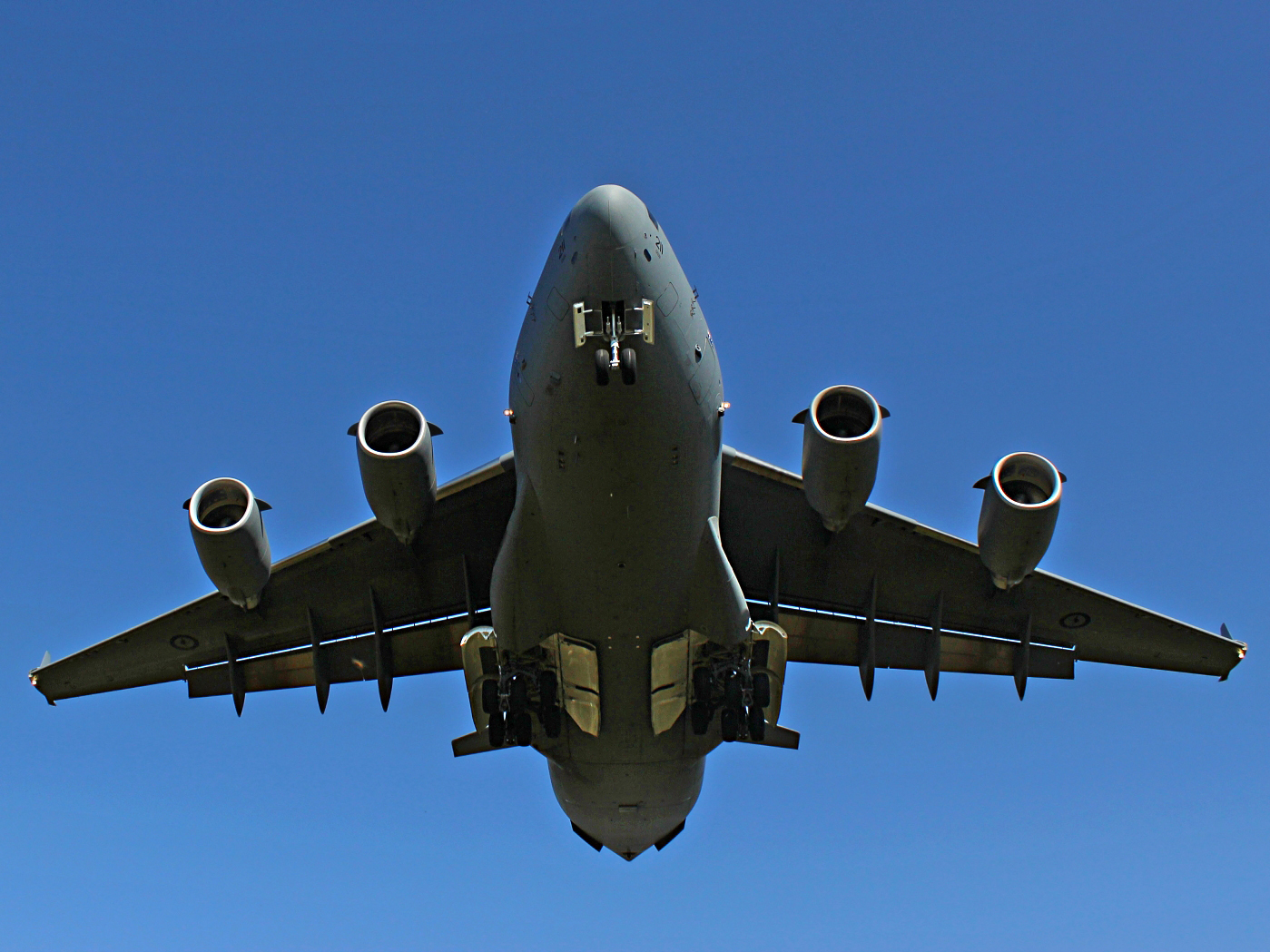
A Royal Australian Air Force C-17 landing at Kharkiv International Airport, showing its landing gear

For cargo operations the C-17 requires a crew of three: pilot, copilot, and loadmaster. The cargo compartment is 88 feet (27 m) long by 18 feet (5.5 m) wide by 12 feet 4 inches (3.76 m) high. The cargo floor has rollers for palletized cargo but it can be flipped to provide a flat floor suitable for vehicles and other rolling stock. Cargo is loaded through a large aft ramp that accommodates rolling stock, such as a 69-ton (63-metric ton) M1 Abrams main battle tank, other armored vehicles, trucks, and trailers, along with palletized cargo.

Maximum payload of the C-17 is 170,900 pounds (77,500 kg; 85.5 short tons), and its maximum takeoff weight is 585,000 pounds (265,000 kg). With a payload of 160,000 pounds (73,000 kg) and an initial cruise altitude of 28,000 ft (8,500 m), the C-17 has an unrefueled range of about 2,400 nautical miles (4,400 kilometres) on the first 71 aircraft, and 2,800 nautical miles (5,200 kilometres) on all subsequent extended-range models that include a sealed center wing bay as a fuel tank. Boeing informally calls these aircraft the C-17 ER. The C-17's cruise speed is about 450 knots (830 km/h) (Mach 0.74). It is designed to airdrop 102 paratroopers and their equipment. According to Boeing the maximum unloaded range is 6,230 nautical miles (11,540 km).

The C-17 is designed to operate from runways as short as 3,500 ft (1,067 m) and as narrow as 90 ft (27 m). The C-17 can also operate from unpaved, unimproved runways (although with a higher probability of damage to the aircraft). The thrust reversers can be used to move the aircraft backwards and reverse direction on narrow taxiways using a three- (or more) point turn. The plane is designed for 20 man-hours of maintenance per flight hour, and a 74% mission availability rate.

== Operational history ==
=== United States Air Force ===
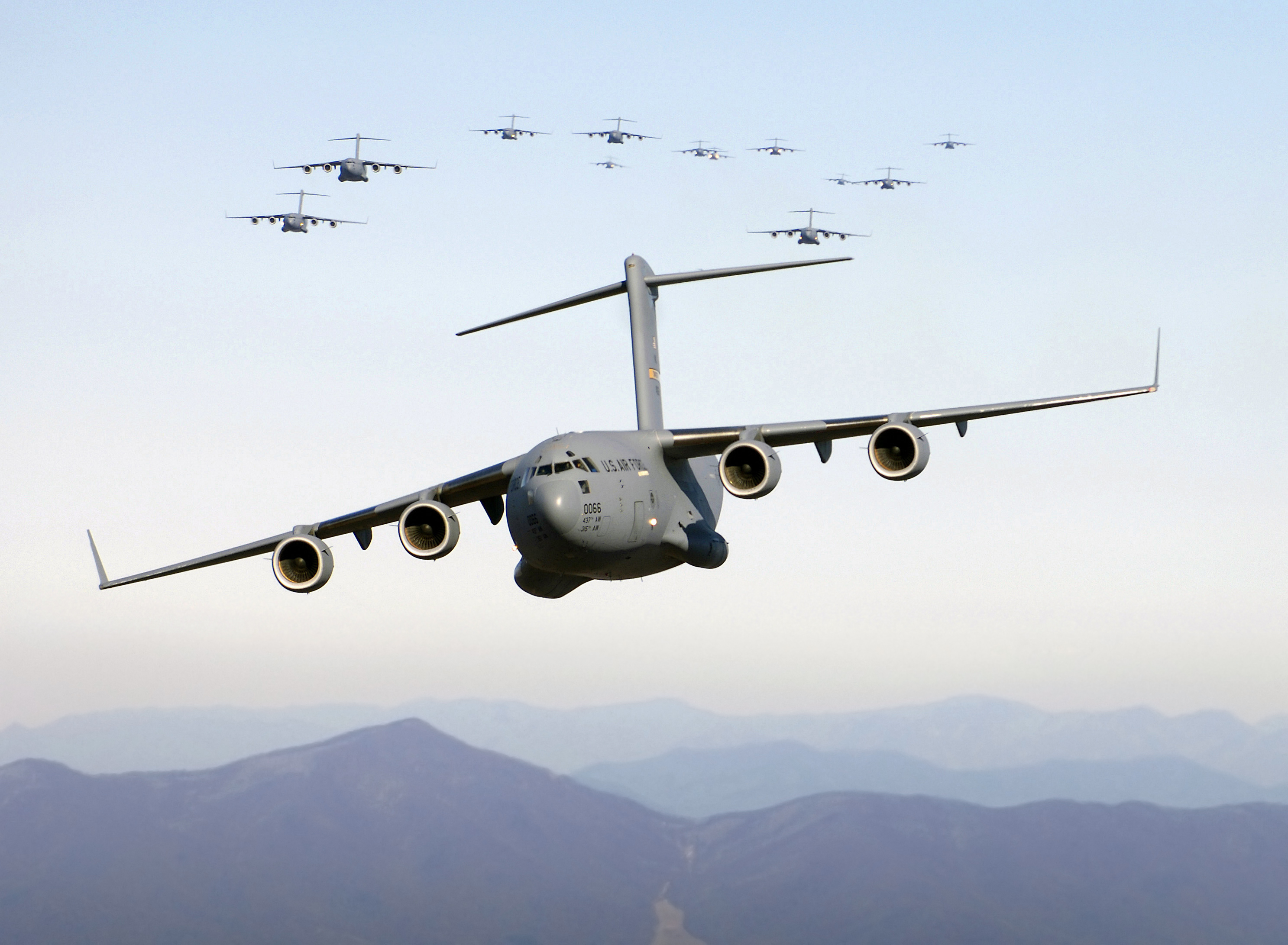
USAF C-17s fly over the Blue Ridge Mountains in the eastern U.S., December 2005.

The first production C-17 was delivered to Charleston Air Force Base, South Carolina, on 14 July 1993. The first C-17 unit, the 17th Airlift Squadron, became operationally ready on 17 January 1995. It has broken 22 records for oversized payloads. The C-17 was awarded U.S. aviation's most prestigious award, the Collier Trophy, in 1994. A Congressional report on operations in Kosovo and Operation Allied Force noted "One of the great success stories...was the performance of the Air Force's C-17A" It flew half of the strategic airlift missions in the operation, the type could use small airfields, easing operations; rapid turnaround times also led to efficient utilization.

C-17s delivered military supplies during Operation Enduring Freedom in Afghanistan and Operation Iraqi Freedom in Iraq as well as humanitarian aid in the aftermath of the 2010 Haiti earthquake, and the 2011 Sindh floods, delivering thousands of food rations, tons of medical and emergency supplies. On 26 March 2003, 15 USAF C-17s participated in the biggest combat airdrop since the United States invasion of Panama in December 1989: the night-time airdrop of 1,000 paratroopers from the 173rd Airborne Brigade occurred over Bashur, Iraq. These airdrops were followed by C-17s ferrying M1 Abrams, M2 Bradleys, M113s and artillery. USAF C-17s have also assisted allies in their airlift needs, such as Canadian vehicles to Afghanistan in 2003 and Australian forces for the Australian-led military deployment to East Timor in 2006. In 2006, USAF C-17s flew 15 Canadian Leopard C2 tanks from Kyrgyzstan into Kandahar in support of NATO's Afghanistan mission. In 2013, five USAF C-17s supported French operations in Mali, operating with other nations' C-17s (RAF, NATO and RCAF deployed a single C-17 each).

Flight crews have nicknamed the aircraft "the Moose", because during ground refueling, the pressure relief vents make a sound like the call of a female moose in heat.

Since 1999, C-17s have flown annually to Antarctica on Operation Deep Freeze in support of the US Antarctic Research Program, replacing the C-141s used in prior years. The initial flight was flown by the USAF 62nd Airlift Wing. The C-17s fly round trip between Christchurch Airport and McMurdo Station around October each year and take 5 hours to fly each way. In 2006, the C-17 flew its first Antarctic airdrop mission, delivering 70,000 pounds of supplies. Further air drops occurred during subsequent years.

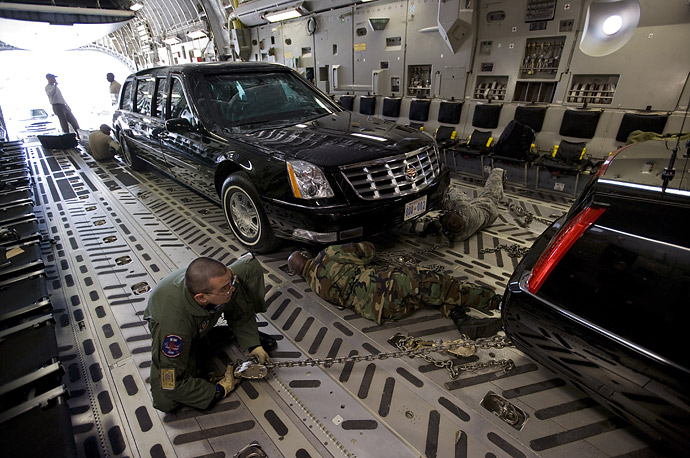
The U.S. Presidential Limousine is transported by a C-17 for long-distance trips.

A C-17 accompanies the President of the United States on his visits to both domestic and foreign arrangements, consultations, and meetings. It is used to transport the Presidential Limousine, Marine One, and security detachments. On several occasions, a C-17 has been used to transport the President himself, using the Air Force One call sign while doing so.

==== Rapid Dragon missile launcher testing ====
In 2015, as part of a missile-defense test at Wake Island, simulated medium-range ballistic missiles were launched from C-17s against THAAD missile defense systems and the USS John Paul Jones (DDG-53). In early 2020, palletized munitions–"Combat Expendable Platforms"– were tested from C-17s and C-130Js with results the USAF considered positive.

In 2021, the Air Force Research Laboratory (AFRL) further developed the concept into tests of the Rapid Dragon system, which transforms the C-17 into a lethal cruise missile arsenal ship capable of mass launching 45 JASSM-ER with 500 kg warheads from a standoff distance of 925 km (575 mi). Anticipated improvements included support for JDAM-ER, mine laying, drone dispersal as well as improved standoff range when full production of the 1,900 km (1,200 mi) JASSM-XR was expected to deliver large inventories in 2024.

==== Evacuation of Afghanistan ====
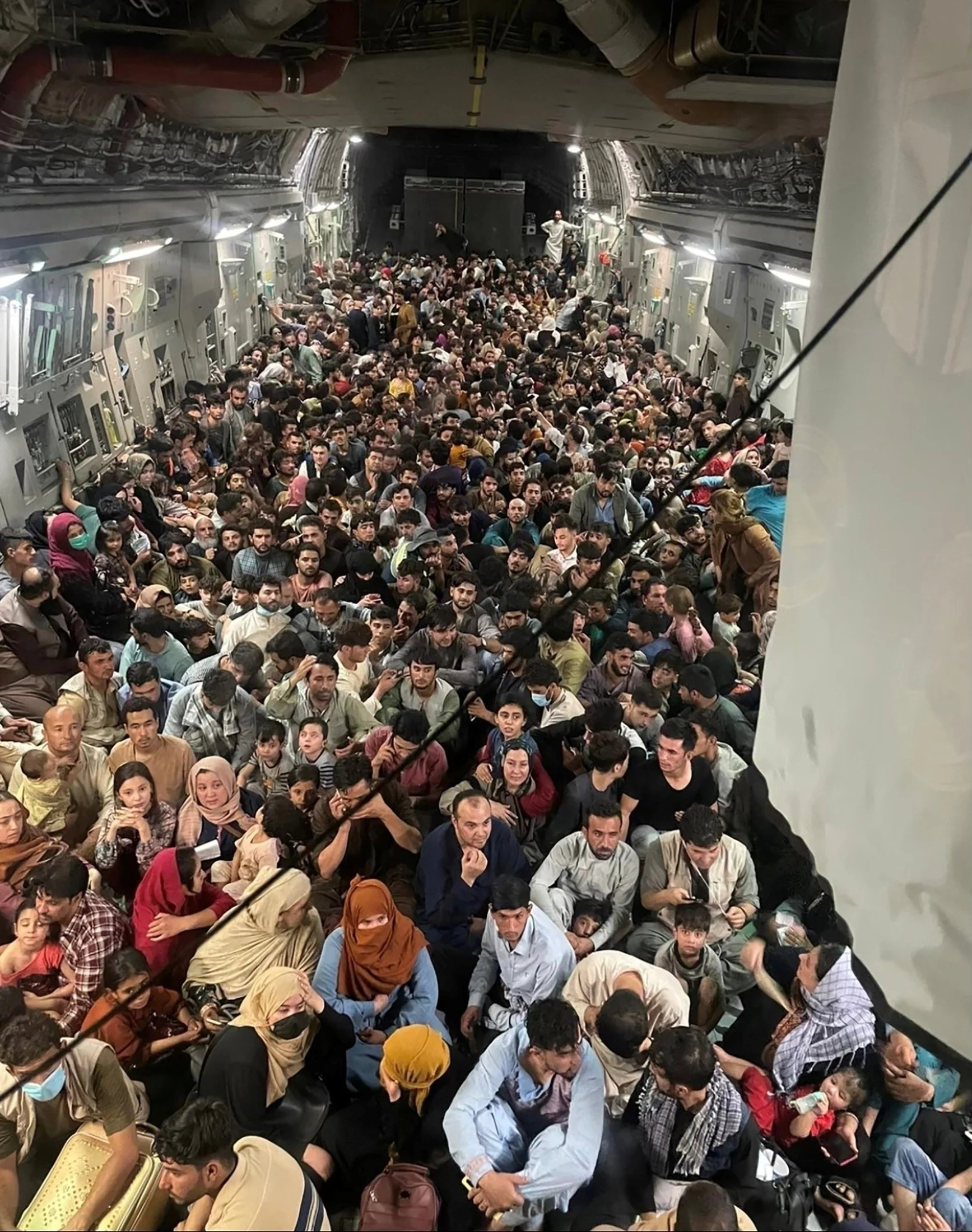
A C-17 evacuating 823 passengers out of Kabul on 15 August 2021

On 15 August 2021, USAF C-17 02-1109 from the 62nd Airlift Wing and 446th Airlift Wing at Joint Base Lewis-McChord departed Hamid Karzai International Airport in Kabul, Afghanistan, while crowds of people trying to escape the 2021 Taliban offensive ran alongside the aircraft. The C-17 lifted off with people holding on to the outside, and at least two died after falling from the aircraft. There were an unknown number possibly crushed and killed by the landing gear retracting, with human remains found in the landing-gear stowage. Also that day, C-17 01-0186 from the 816th Expeditionary Airlift Squadron at Al Udeid Air Base transported 823 Afghan citizens from Hamid Karzai International Airport on a single flight, setting a new record for the type, which was previously over 670 people during a 2013 typhoon evacuation from Tacloban, Philippines.

=== Royal Air Force ===
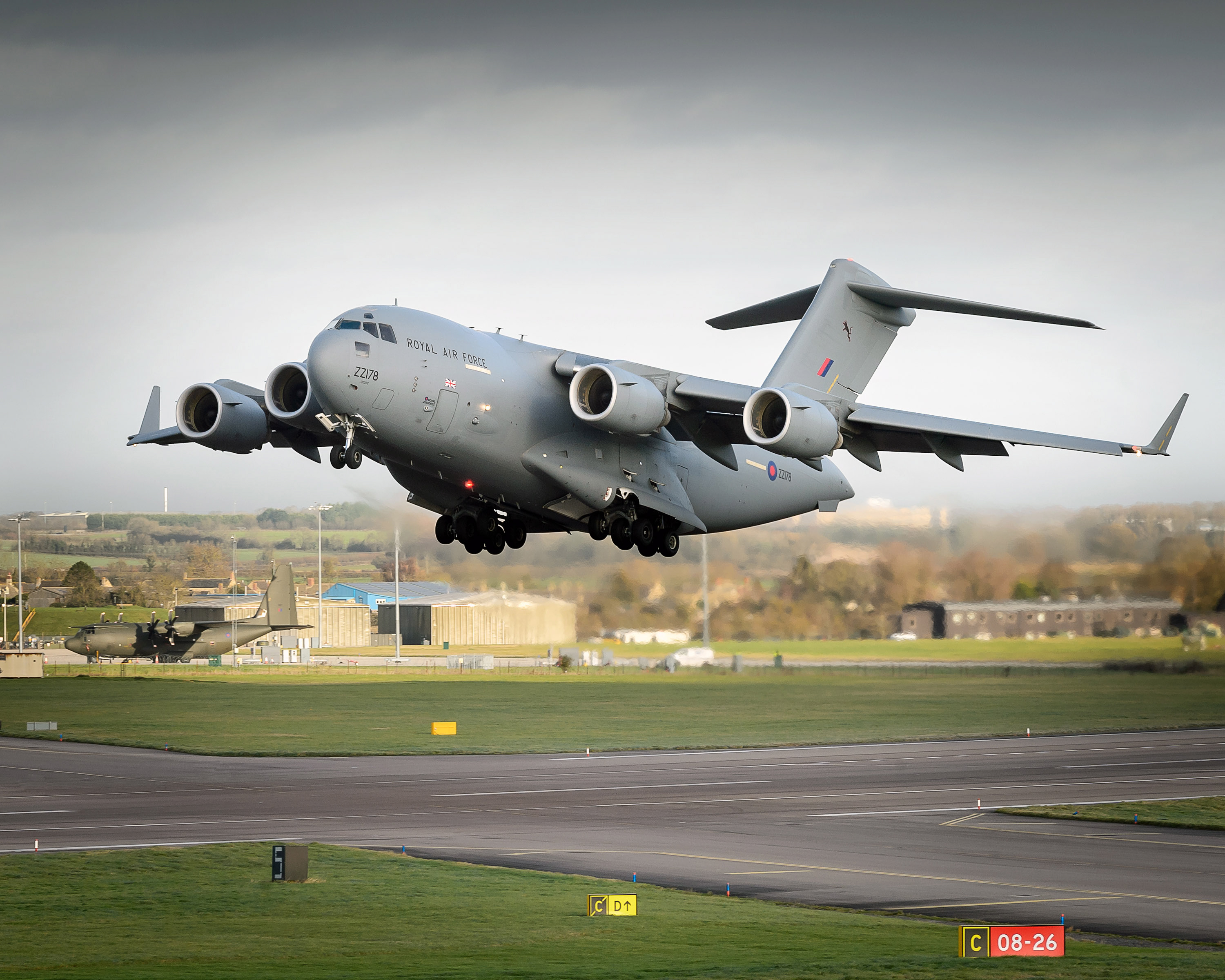
RAF C-17 taking off from RAF Brize Norton

On 13 January 2013, the RAF deployed two C-17s from RAF Brize Norton to the French Évreux Air Base, transporting French armored vehicles to the Malian capital of Bamako during the French intervention in Mali. In June 2015, an RAF C-17 was used to medically evacuate four victims of the 2015 Sousse attacks from Tunisia. On 13 September 2022, C-17 ZZ177 carried the body of Queen Elizabeth II from Edinburgh Airport to RAF Northolt in London. She had been lying in state at St Giles' Cathedral in Edinburgh, Scotland.

=== Royal Canadian Air Force ===
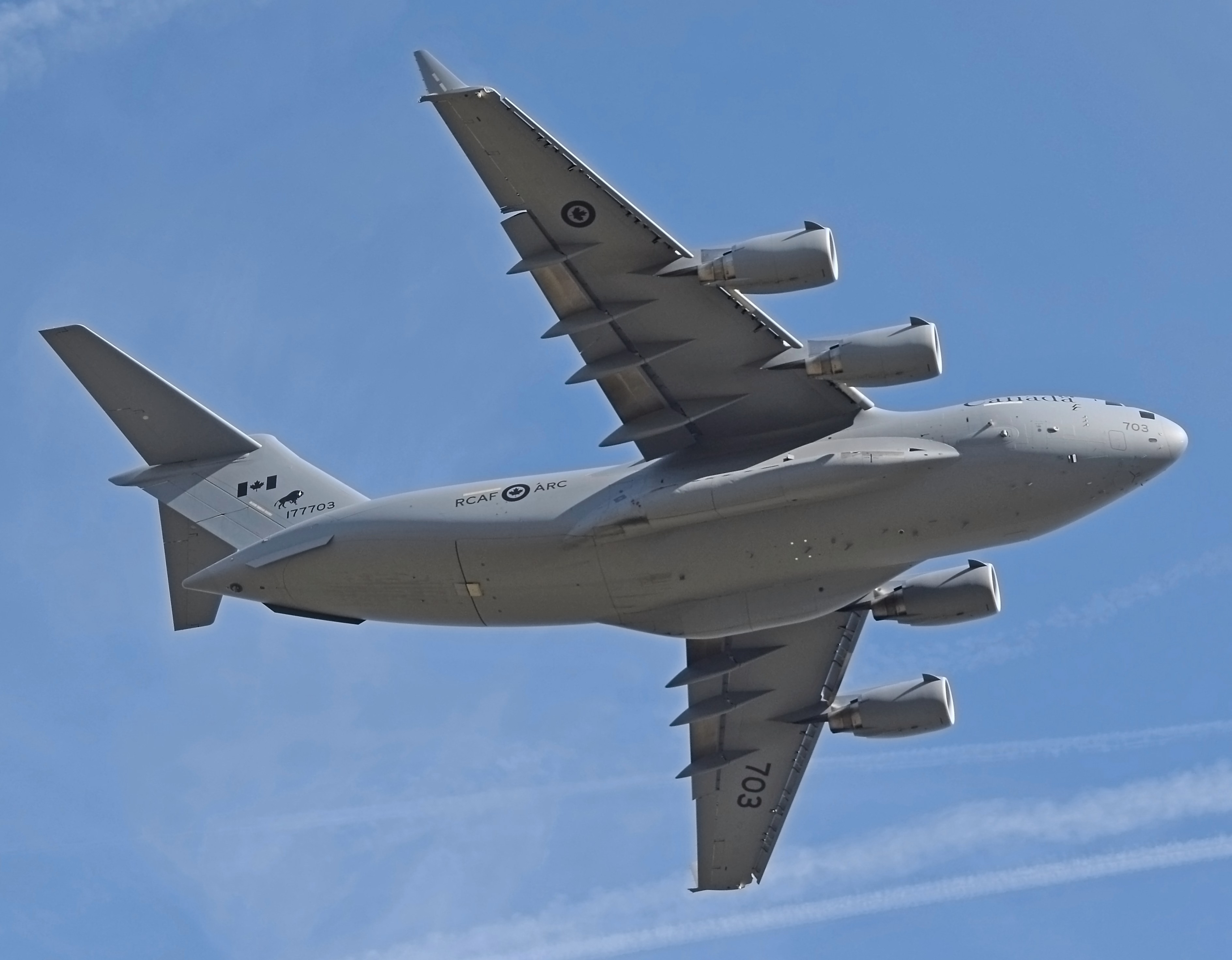
A Royal Canadian Air Force CC-177 (code 177703) departs the 2017 Royal International Air Tattoo, RAF Fairford, England.

The Canadian Armed Forces had a long-standing need for strategic airlift for military and humanitarian operations around the world. It had followed a pattern similar to the German Air Force in leasing Antonovs and Ilyushins for many requirements, including deploying the Disaster Assistance Response Team (DART) to tsunami-stricken Sri Lanka in 2005; the Canadian Forces had relied entirely on leased An-124 Ruslan for a Canadian Army deployment to Haiti in 2003. A combination of leased Ruslans, Ilyushins and USAF C-17s was also used to move heavy equipment to Afghanistan. In 2002, the Canadian Forces Future Strategic Airlifter Project began to study alternatives, including long-term leasing arrangements.

On 14 April 2010, a Canadian CC-177 landed for the first time at CFS Alert, the world's most northerly airport. Canadian Globemasters have been deployed in support of numerous missions worldwide, including Operation Hestia after the 2010 Haiti earthquake, providing airlift as part of Operation Mobile and support to the Canadian mission in Afghanistan. After Typhoon Haiyan hit the Philippines in 2013, CC-177s established an air bridge between the two nations, deploying Canada's DART and delivering humanitarian supplies and equipment. In 2014, they supported Operation Reassurance and Operation Impact.

=== Strategic Airlift Capability program ===
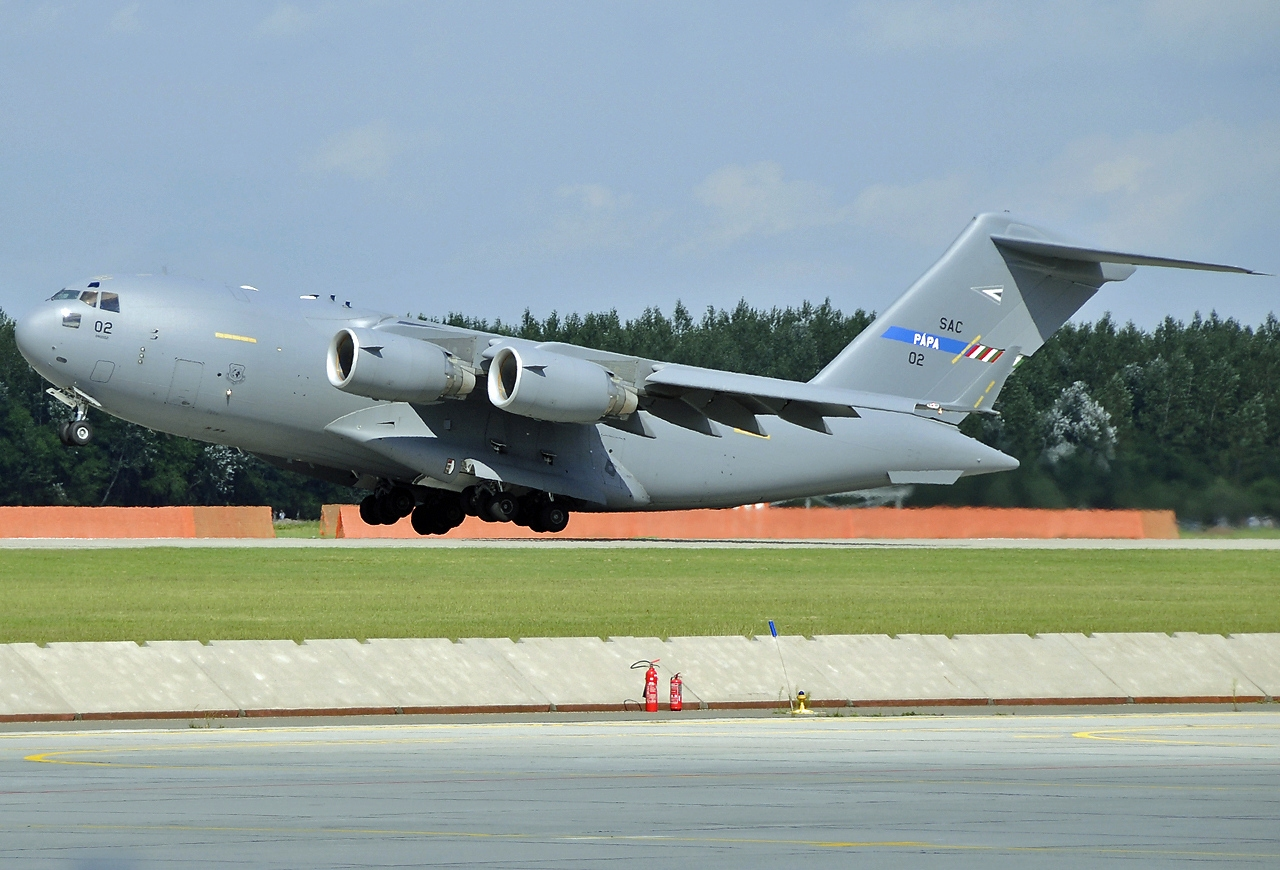
One of the Strategic Airlift Capability C-17s

At the 2006 Farnborough Airshow, a number of NATO member nations signed a letter of intent to jointly purchase and operate several C-17s within the Strategic Airlift Capability (SAC). The purchase was for two C-17s, and a third was contributed by the U.S. On 14 July 2009, Boeing delivered the first C-17 for the SAC program with the second and third C-17s delivered in September and October 2009. SAC members are Bulgaria, Estonia, Finland, Hungary, Lithuania, the Netherlands, Norway, Poland, Romania, Slovenia, Sweden and the U.S. as of 2024.

The SAC C-17s are based at Pápa Air Base, Hungary. The Heavy Airlift Wing is hosted by Hungary, which acts as the flag nation. The aircraft are crewed in similar fashion as the NATO E-3 AWACS aircraft. The C-17 flight crew are multi-national, but each mission is assigned to an individual member nation based on the SAC's annual flight hour share agreement. The NATO Airlift Management Programme Office (NAMPO) provides management and support for the Heavy Airlift Wing. NAMPO is a part of the NATO Support Agency (NSPA). In September 2014, Boeing stated that the three C-17s supporting SAC missions had achieved a readiness rate of nearly 94 percent over the last five years and supported over 1,000 missions.

=== Indian Air Force ===
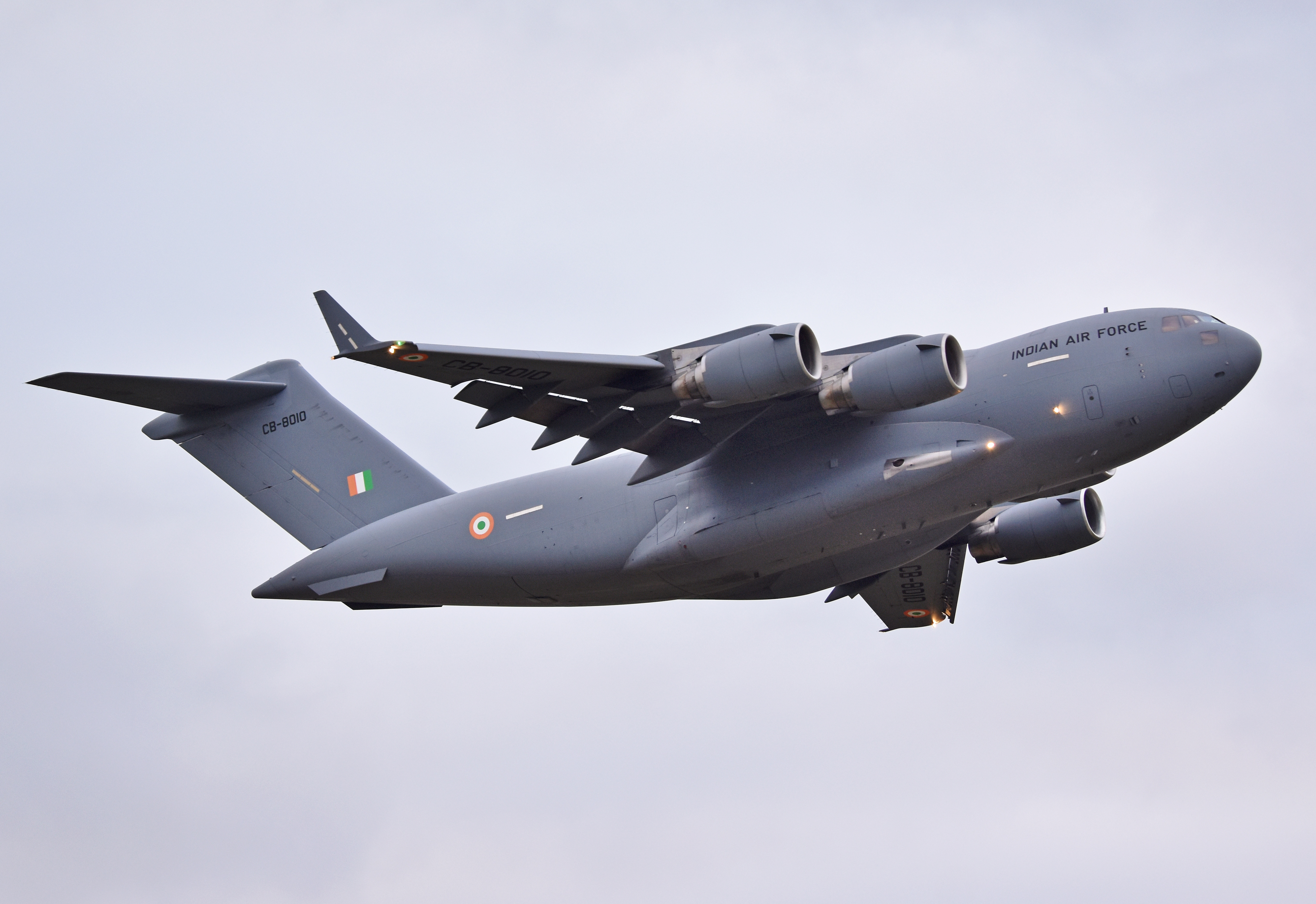
Boeing C-17A Globemaster III 'CB-8010'

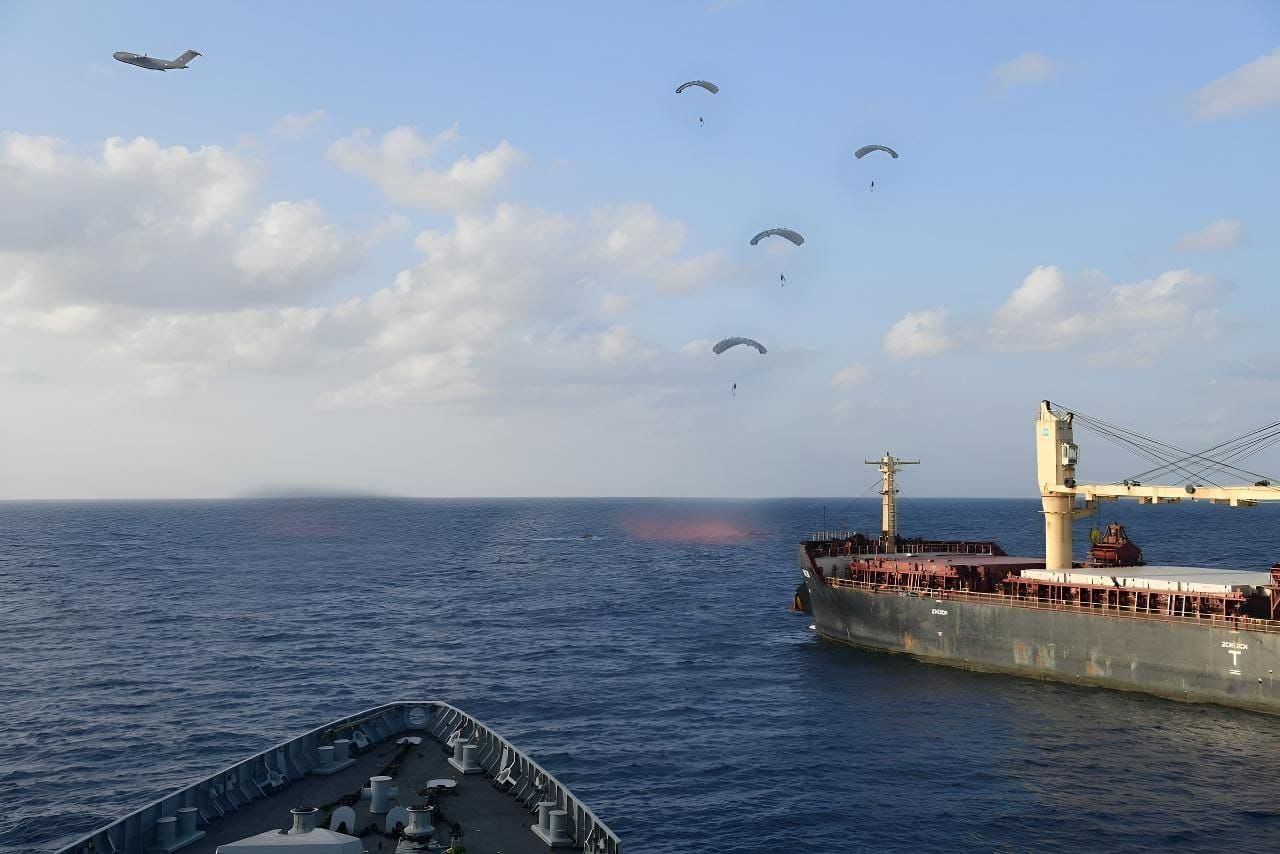
An IAF C-17 paradropping Indian Navy MARCOS commandos over the hijacked MV Ruen in 2024 as a part of anti-piracy Operation Sankalp

India initially announced its interest in buying the C-17 platform during a visit by Barack Obama to New Delhi in 2010. Following a clearance from India's defence acquisition council (DAC) led by Prime Minister Manmohan Singh, India signed a deal to purchase 10 C-17 aircraft from the United States on 6th June 2011 via a FMS agreement that was valued at about ₹18,000 crore (equivalent to ₹400 billion or US$4.3 billion in 2026). Boeing was also made to sign an offset agreement to source at least 30% of the order value from India. India also bought 45 engines, missile warning systems, spares and repair parts, repair and return, IR flares from US subcontractors in a separate agreement.

The C-17 provides the IAF with strategic airlift, the ability to deploy special forces, and to operate in diverse terrains ranging from high-altitude Himalayan air bases in the north to Indian Ocean bases in the south. All IAF C-17s are based at Hindon Air Force Station and are operated by No. 81 Squadron IAF Skylords.

The first C-17 was delivered in January 2013 for testing and training; it was officially accepted on 11 June 2013. The second C-17 was delivered on 23 July 2013 and put into service immediately. IAF Chief of Air Staff Norman AK Browne called it "a major component in the IAF's modernization drive" while taking delivery of the aircraft at Boeing's Long Beach factory. On 2 September 2013, the Skylords squadron with three C-17s officially entered IAF service.The Skylords regularly fly missions within India, such as to high-altitude bases at Leh and Thoise. The IAF first used the C-17 to transport an infantry battalion's equipment to Port Blair on Andaman Islands on 1 July 2013. Foreign deployments to date include Tajikistan in August 2013, and Rwanda to support Indian peacekeepers. One C-17 was used for transporting relief materials during Cyclone Phailin.

The sixth aircraft was received in July 2014. In June 2017, the U.S. Department of State approved the potential sale of one C-17 to India under a proposed $366 million (~$472 million in 2025) U.S. Foreign Military Sale. This aircraft, the last C-17 produced, increased the IAF's fleet to 11 C-17s. In March 2018, a contract was awarded for completion by 22 August 2019. On 26 August 2019, Boeing delivered the 11th C-17 Globemaster III to the Indian Air Force.

An IAF C-17 executed a precision airdrop of two Combat Rubberised Raiding Craft along with a platoon of 8 MARCOS commandos in an operation to rescue the ex-MV Ruen, a Maltese-flagged cargo ship hijacked by Somali pirates in December 2023. The mission was conducted on 16 March 2024 in a 10-hour round trip mission to an area 2600 km away from the Indian coast. The ship was being used as a mothership for piracy. In a joint operation carried out with the Indian Navy assets such as P-8I Neptune maritime patrol aircraft, SeaGuardian drones, destroyer INS Kolkata and patrol vessel INS Subhadra, the IAF C-17 airdropped Navy's MARCOS commandos, who boarded the hijacked ship, rescued 17 sailors and disarmed 35 pirates in the operation.

On 5 August 2025, the Defence Acquisition Council (DAC) accorded the Acceptance of Necessity (AoN) for the sustenance of the C-17 and C-130J fleet of the Indian Air Force. Upon the request of Iran, Indian Navy MARCOS commandos also paradropped from an IAF C-17 on 2 November 2026 on a anti-piracy commando raid. They were dropped into the Arabian sea, near Somalia, then proceeded to storm and secure an Iranian fishing vessel Azini ,successfully eliminated the pirate threat, and safely freed the 20-man crew. They were again aided by mission deployed INS Kolkata, deployed over 3000 kilometers from Mumbai.

=== Qatar ===
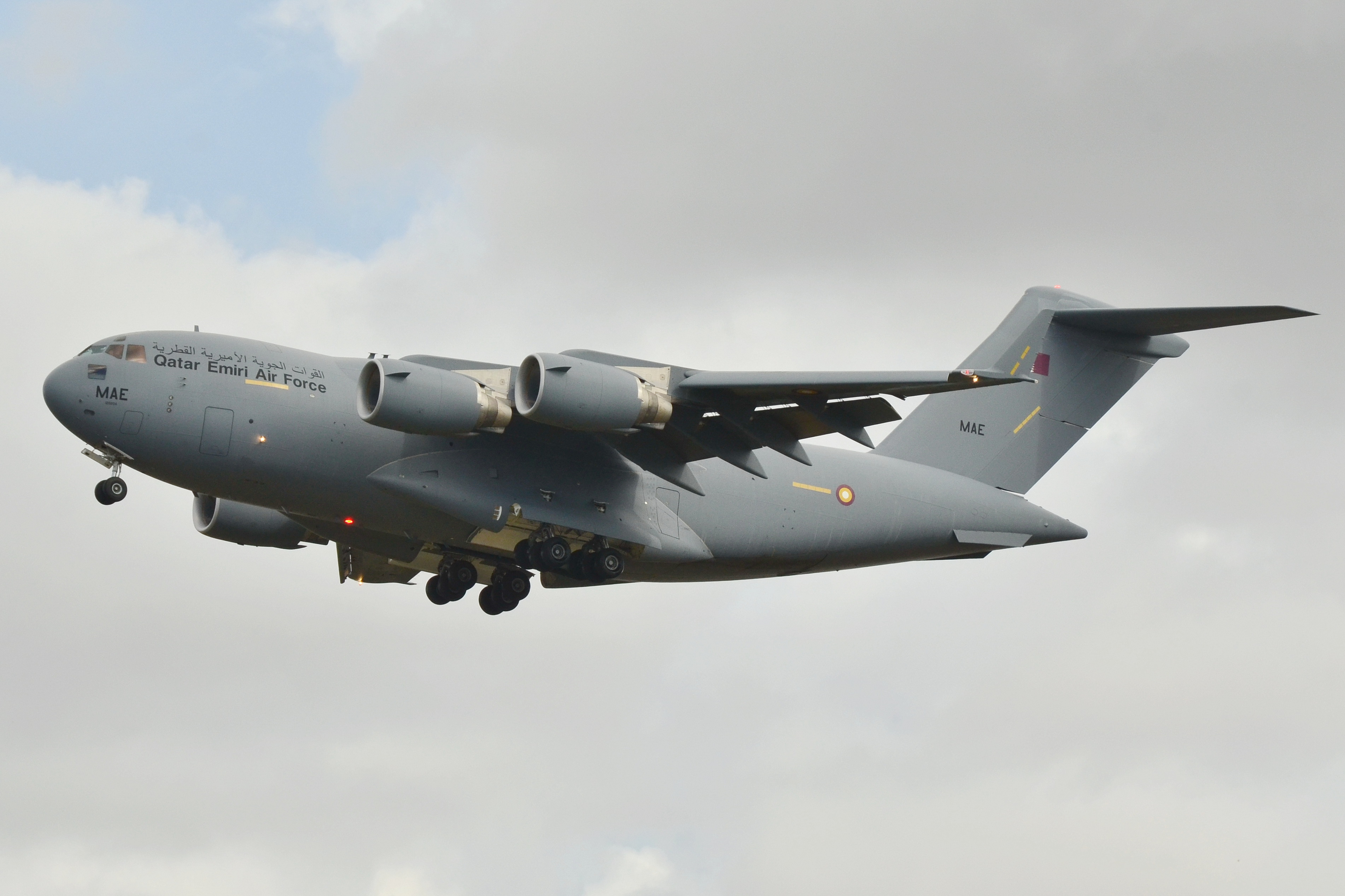
Qatar Emiri Air Force C-17

Boeing delivered Qatar's first C-17 on 11 August 2009 and the second on 10 September 2009 for the Qatar Emiri Air Force. Qatar received its third C-17 in 2012, and fourth C-17 was received on 10 December 2012. In June 2013, The New York Times reported that Qatar was allegedly using its C-17s to ship weapons from Libya to the Syrian opposition during the civil war via Turkey. On 15 June 2015, it was announced at the Paris Airshow that Qatar agreed to order four additional C-17s from the five remaining "white tail" C-17s to double Qatar's C-17 fleet. One Qatari C-17 bears the civilian markings of government-owned Qatar Airways, although the airplane is owned and operated by the Qatar Emiri Air Force. The head of Qatar's airlift selection committee, Ahmed Al-Malki, said the paint scheme was "to build awareness of Qatar's participation in operations around the world."

== Variants ==
- C-17A: Initial military airlifter version
- C-17A "ER": Unofficial name for C-17As with extended range due to the addition of the center wing tank. This upgrade was incorporated in production beginning in 2001 with Block 13 aircraft.
  - Block 16: This software/hardware upgrade was a major improvement of the improved Onboard Inert Gas-Generating System (OBIGGS II), a new weather radar, an improved stabilizer strut system and other avionics.
  - Block 21: Adds ADS-B capability, IFF modification, communication/navigation upgrades and improved flight management.
- C-17B: A proposed tactical airlifter version with double-slotted flaps, an additional main landing gear on the center fuselage, more powerful engines, and other systems for shorter landing and take-off distances. Boeing offered the C-17B to the U.S. military in 2007 for carrying the Army's Future Combat Systems (FCS) vehicles and other equipment.
- KC-17: Proposed tanker variant of the C-17.
- MD-17: Proposed variant for U.S. airlines participating in the Civil Reserve Air Fleet, later redesignated as BC-17X after 1997 merger.

== Operators ==
Map of countries that operate the C-17 Globemaster III (highlighted in blue)

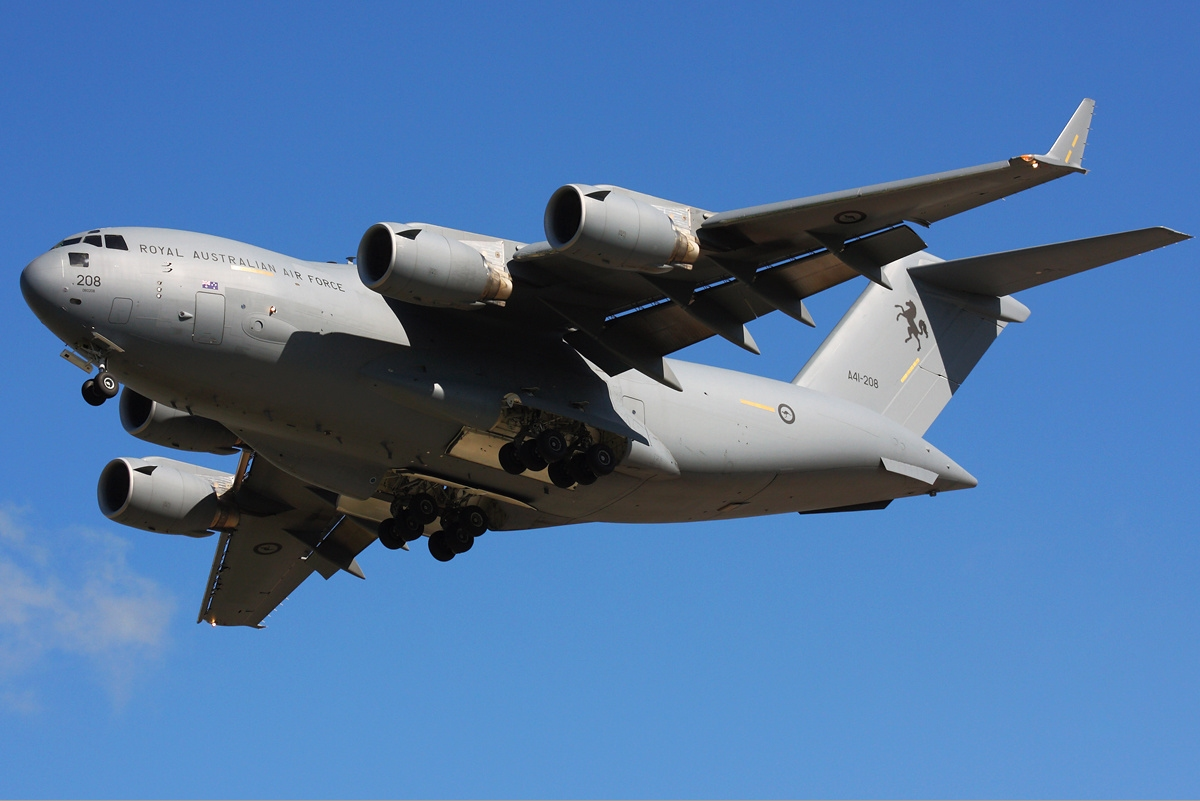
An RAAF C-17 in 2010

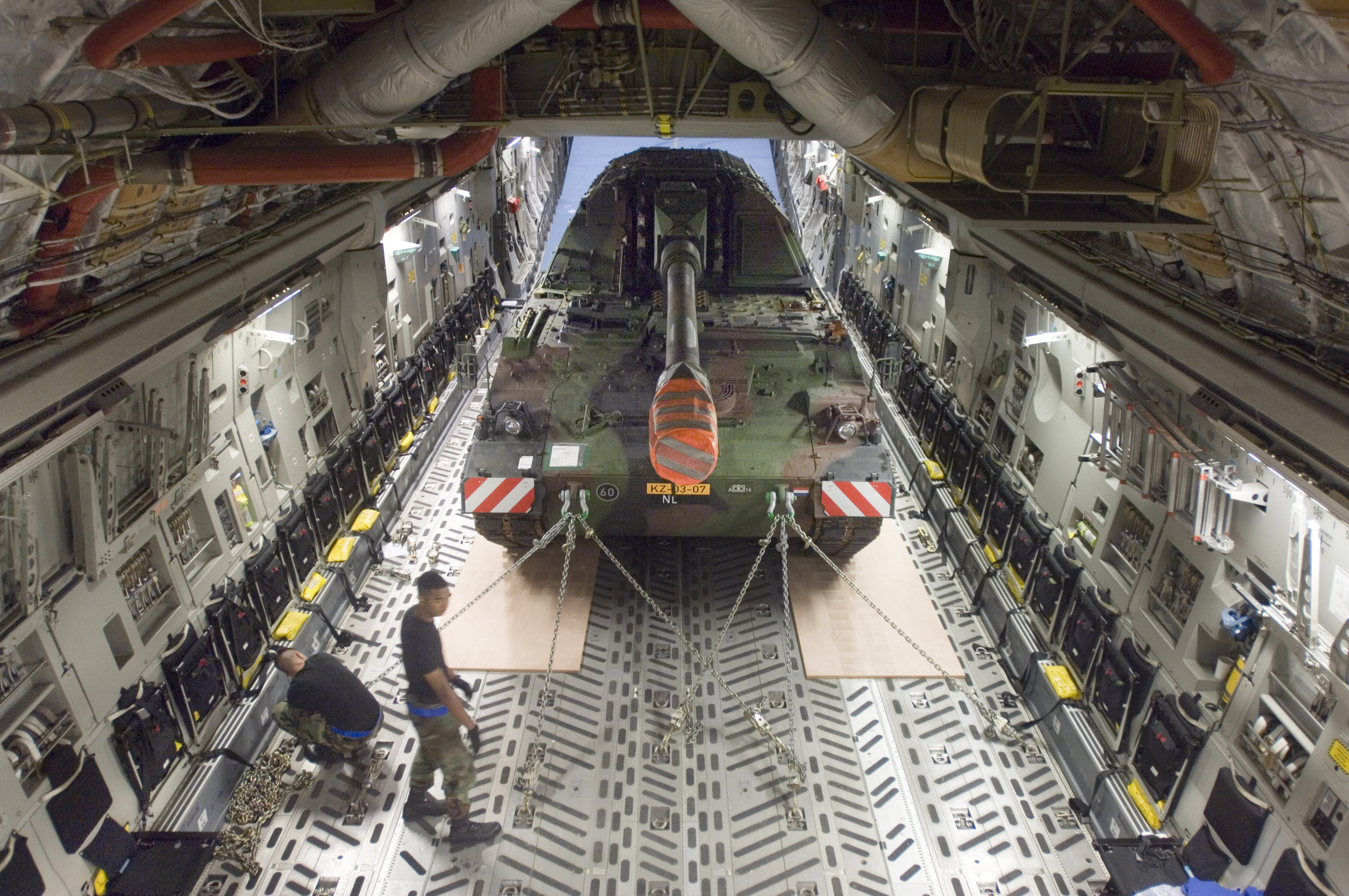
U.S. Air Force C-17 transporting a Dutch PzH 2000 self-propelled howitzer to Afghanistan, 2006

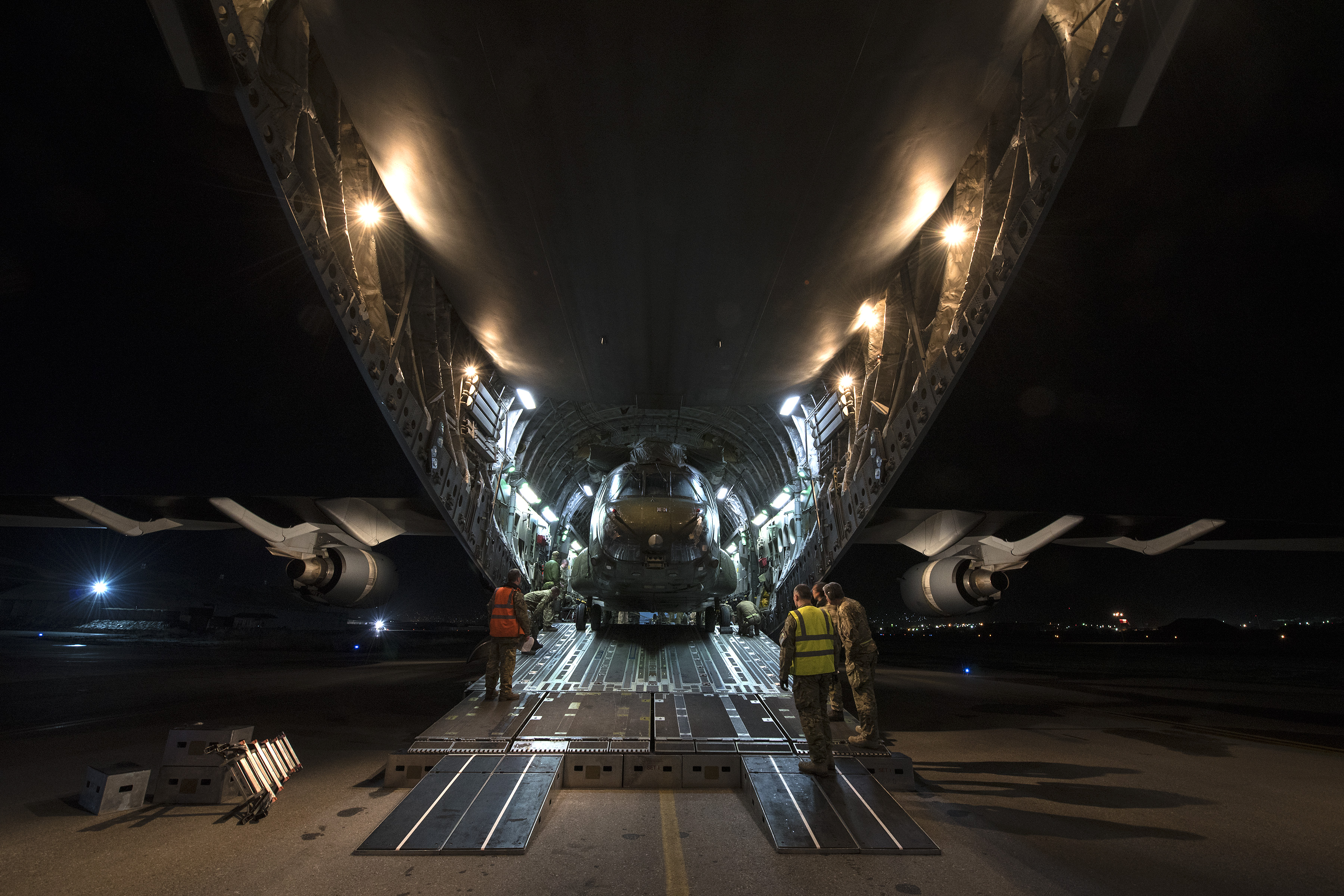
An RAF Chinook helicopter is loaded into a C-17.

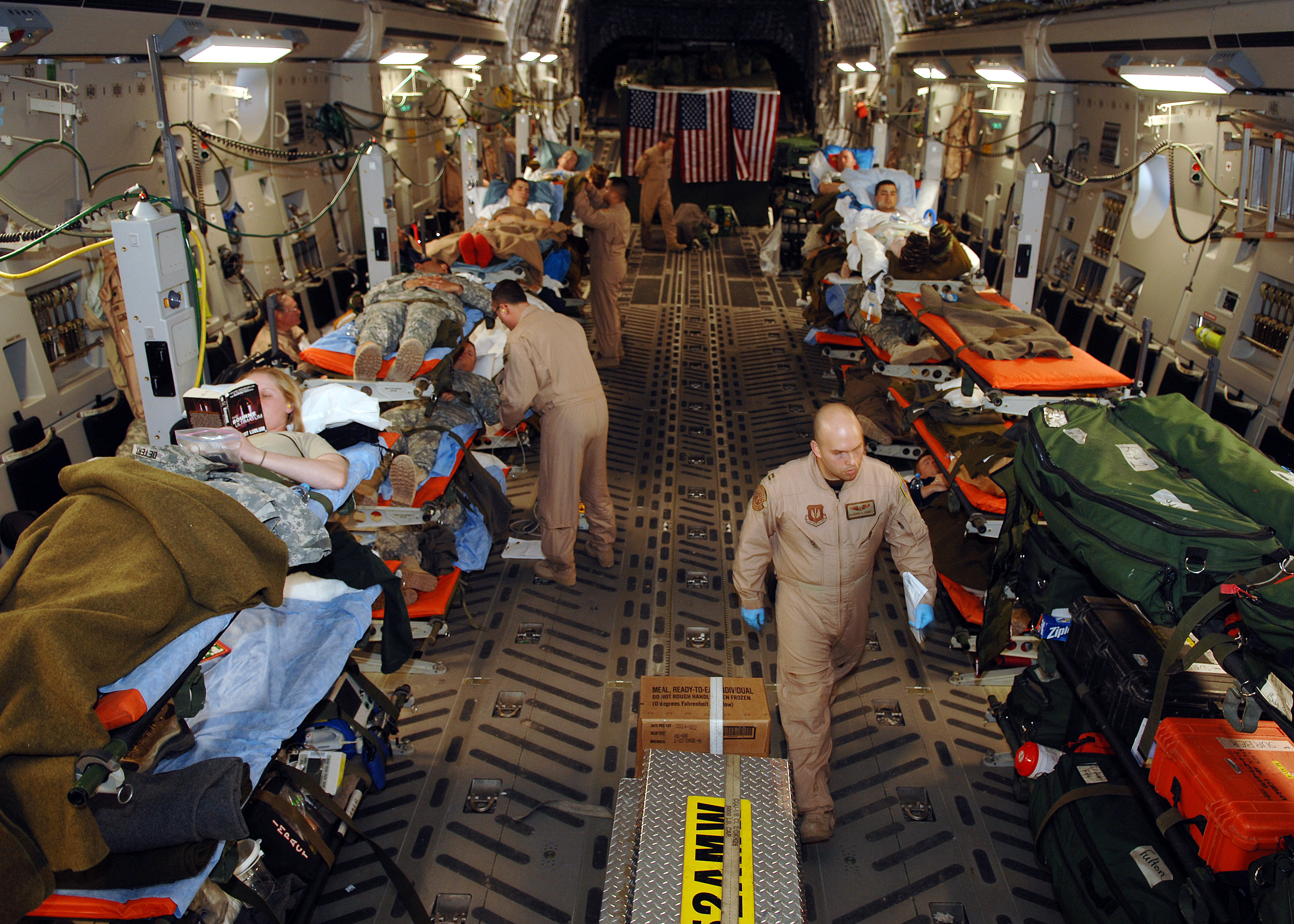
A C-17 in its aeromedical evacuation configuration

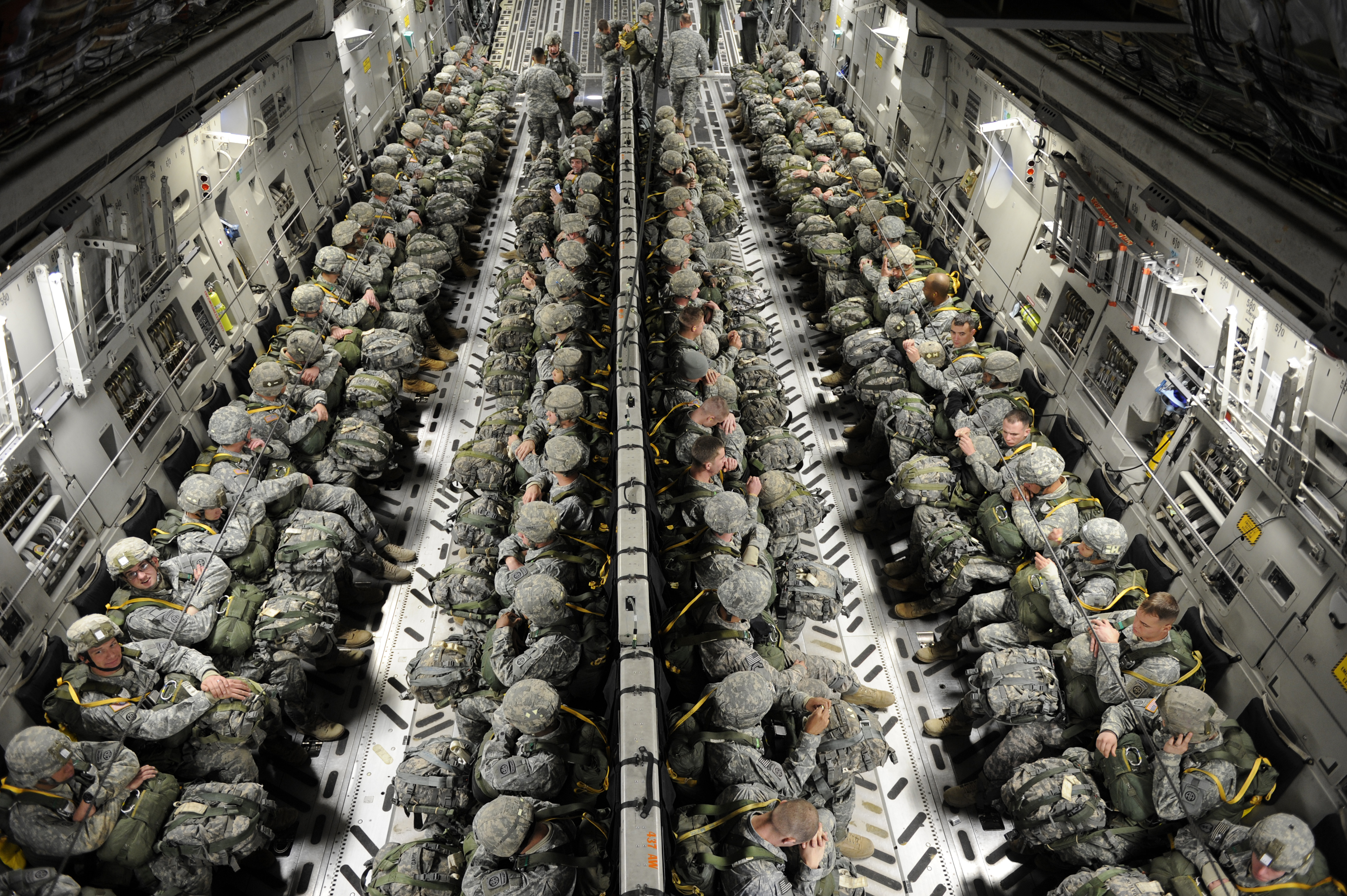
United States Army paratroopers seated in a C-17 as it maneuvers to a drop zone for a simulated mass-attack airdrop, over Pope Field in North Carolina

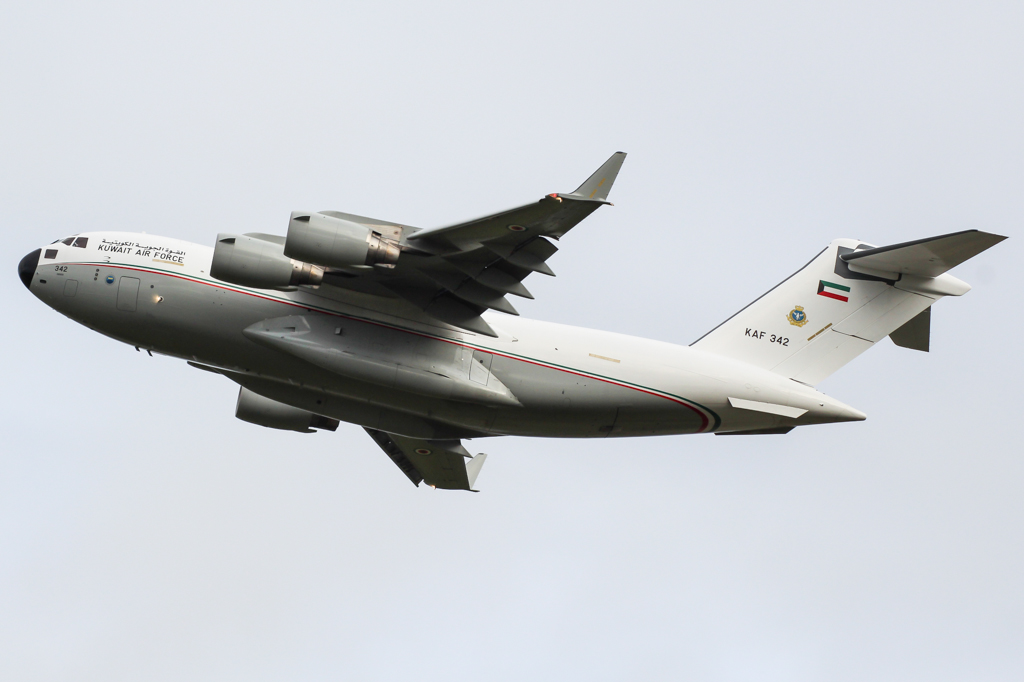
A Kuwait Air Force C-17 in 2015

A C-17 airdrops HMMWVs and paratroopers from the 509th Infantry Regiment on night infiltration exercise.

A C-17 aircrew conduct Maritime Craft Aerial Deployment System (MCADS) exercise with Special Boat Team 20.

Australia

- Royal Australian Air Force – 8 C-17A ERs in service as of January 2018.
  - No. 36 Squadron

Canada

- Royal Canadian Air Force – 5 CC-177 (C-17A ER) aircraft in use as of January 2025.
  - 429 Transport Squadron, CFB Trenton, Ontario

India

- Indian Air Force – 11 C-17s as of August 2019.
  - No. 81 Squadron (Skylords), Hindon AFS

Kuwait

- Kuwait Air Force – 2 C-17s as of January 2018

(European Union) Europe

- The multi-nation Strategic Airlift Capability Heavy Airlift Wing – 3 C-17s in service as of January 2018, including 1 C-17 contributed by the USAF; based at Pápa Air Base, Hungary.

Qatar

- Qatar Emiri Air Force – 8 C-17As in use as of January 2018,

United Arab Emirates

- United Arab Emirates Air Force – 8 C-17As in operation as of January 2018

United Kingdom

- Royal Air Force – 8 C-17A ERs in use as of May 2021
  - No. 24 Squadron, RAF Brize Norton
  - No. 99 Squadron, RAF Brize Norton

United States

- United States Air Force – 219 C-17s in service as of January 2026 (157 Active, 47 Air National Guard, 18 Air Force Reserve)
  - 60th Air Mobility Wing – Travis Air Force Base, California
    - 21st Airlift Squadron
  - 62d Airlift Wing – McChord AFB, Washington
    - 4th Airlift Squadron
    - 7th Airlift Squadron
    - 8th Airlift Squadron
    - 10th Airlift Squadron – (2003–2016)
  - 305th Air Mobility Wing – McGuire Air Force Base, New Jersey
    - 6th Airlift Squadron
  - 385th Air Expeditionary Group – Al Udeid Air Base, Qatar
    - 816th Expeditionary Airlift Squadron
  - 436th Airlift Wing – Dover Air Force Base, Delaware
    - 3rd Airlift Squadron
  - 437th Airlift Wing – Charleston Air Force Base, South Carolina
    - 14th Airlift Squadron
    - 15th Airlift Squadron
    - 16th Airlift Squadron
    - 17th Airlift Squadron – (1993–2015)
  - 3rd Wing – Elmendorf Air Force Base, Alaska
    - 517th Airlift Squadron (Associate)
  - 15th Wing – Hickam Air Force Base, Hawaii
    - 535th Airlift Squadron
  - 97th Air Mobility Wing – Altus AFB, Oklahoma
    - 58th Airlift Squadron
  - 412th Test Wing – Edwards AFB, California
    - 418th Flight Test Squadron
- Air Force Reserve
  - 315th Airlift Wing (Associate) – Charleston AFB, South Carolina
    - 300th Airlift Squadron
    - 317th Airlift Squadron
    - 701st Airlift Squadron
  - 349th Air Mobility Wing (Associate) – Travis AFB, California
    - 301st Airlift Squadron
  - 445th Airlift Wing – Wright-Patterson AFB, Ohio
    - 89th Airlift Squadron
  - 446th Airlift Wing (Associate) – McChord AFB, Washington
    - 97th Airlift Squadron
    - 313th Airlift Squadron
    - 728th Airlift Squadron
  - 452d Air Mobility Wing – March ARB, California
    - 729th Airlift Squadron
  - 507th Air Refueling Wing – Tinker AFB, Oklahoma
    - 730th Air Mobility Training Squadron (Altus AFB)
  - 512th Airlift Wing (Associate) – Dover AFB, Delaware
    - 326th Airlift Squadron
  - 514th Air Mobility Wing (Associate) – McGuire AFB, New Jersey
    - 732d Airlift Squadron
  - 911th Airlift Wing – Pittsburgh Air Reserve Station, Pennsylvania
    - 758th Airlift Squadron
- Air National Guard
  - 105th Airlift Wing – Stewart ANGB, New York
    - 137th Airlift Squadron
  - 145th Airlift Wing – Charlotte Air National Guard Base, North Carolina
    - 156th Airlift Squadron
  - 154th Wing – Hickam AFB, Hawaii
    - 204th Airlift Squadron (Associate)
  - 164th Airlift Wing – Memphis ANGB, Tennessee
    - 155th Airlift Squadron
  - 167th Airlift Wing – Shepherd Field ANGB, West Virginia
    - 167th Airlift Squadron
  - 172d Airlift Wing – Allen C. Thompson Field ANGB, Mississippi
    - 183d Airlift Squadron
  - 176th Wing – Elmendorf AFB, Alaska
    - 144th Airlift Squadron

== Accidents and notable incidents ==
- On 10 September 1998, a USAF C-17 (AF Serial No. 96-0006) delivered Keiko the orca to Vestmannaeyjar, Iceland, a 3,800-foot (1,200 m) runway, and suffered a landing gear failure during landing. There were no injuries, but the landing gear sustained major damage.
- On 10 December 2003, a USAF C-17 (AF Serial No. 98-0057) was hit by a surface-to-air missile after take-off from Baghdad, Iraq. One engine was disabled and the aircraft returned for a safe landing. It was repaired and returned to service.
- On 6 August 2005, a USAF C-17 (AF Serial No. 01-0196) ran off the runway at Bagram Air Base in Afghanistan while attempting to land, destroying its nose and main landing gear. After two months making it flightworthy, a test pilot flew the aircraft to Boeing's Long Beach facility as the temporary repairs imposed performance limitations. In October 2006, it returned to service following repairs.

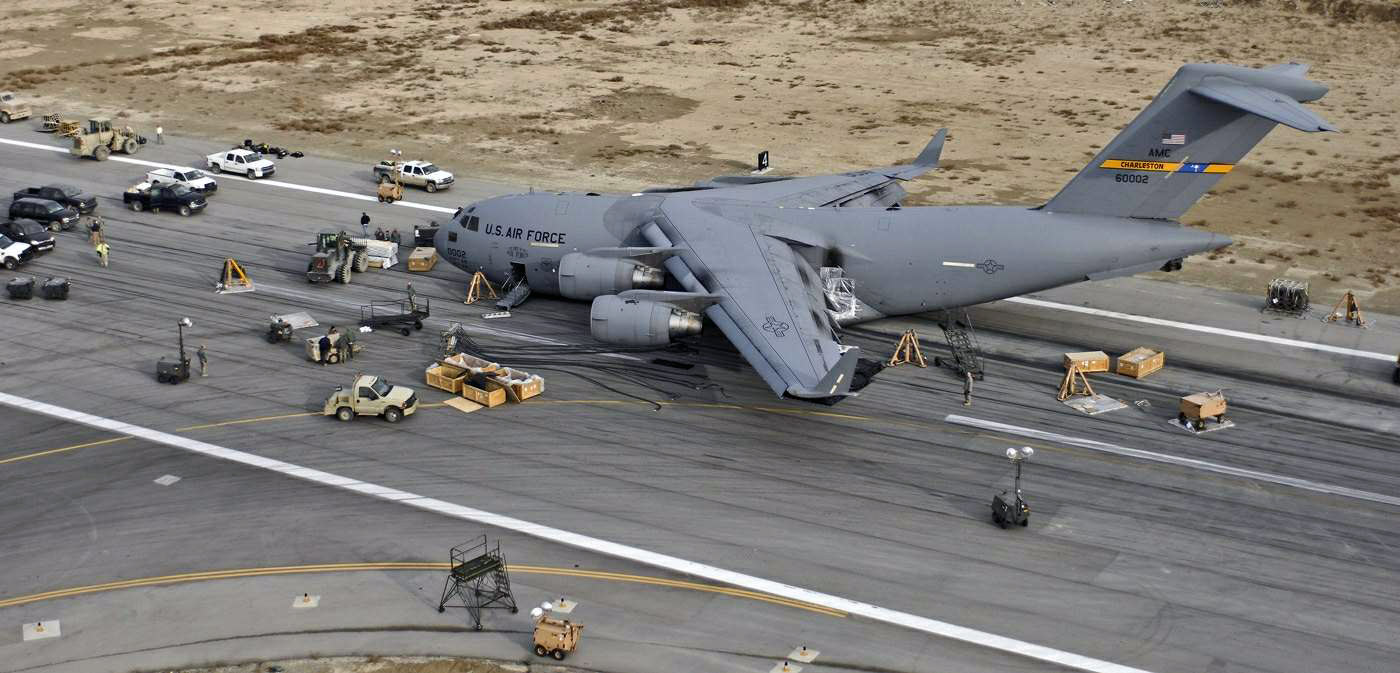
C-17 on the runway at Bagram Air Base, Afghanistan, on 30 January 2009 after landing with landing gear retracted

- On 30 January 2009, a USAF C-17 (AF Serial No. 96-0002 – "Spirit of the Air Force") made a gear-up landing at Bagram Air Base. It was ferried from Bagram AB, making several stops along the way, to Boeing's Long Beach plant for extensive repairs. The USAF Aircraft Accident Investigation Board concluded the cause was the crew's failure to follow the pre-landing checklist and lower the landing gear.
- On 28 July 2010, a USAF C-17 (AF Serial No. 00-0173 – "Spirit of the Aleutians") crashed at Elmendorf Air Force Base, Alaska, while practicing for the 2010 Arctic Thunder Air Show, killing all four aboard. It crashed near a railroad, disrupting rail operations. A military investigation found pilot error caused a stall. This was both the first fatal crash and first hull loss accident of a C-17, and remains the only such event to date.
- On 23 January 2012, a USAF C-17 (AF Serial No. 07-7189), assigned to the 437th Airlift Wing, Joint Base Charleston, South Carolina, landed on runway 34R at Forward Operating Base Shank, Afghanistan. The crew did not realize the required stopping distance exceeded the runway's length thus were unable to stop. It came to rest approximately 700 feet from the runway's end upon an embankment, causing major structural damage but no injuries. After 9 months of repairs to make it airworthy, the C-17 flew to Long Beach. It returned to service at a reported cost of $69.4 million.
- On 20 July 2012, a USAF C-17 of the 305th Air Mobility Wing, flying from McGuire AFB, New Jersey, to MacDill Air Force Base in Tampa, Florida, mistakenly landed at nearby Peter O. Knight Airport, a small municipal field without a control tower, with Gen. Jim Mattis, then commander of CENTCOM, on board. After a few hours, the Globemaster took off from the airport's 3,580-foot (1,090 m) runway without incident and made the short trip to MacDill AFB. The mistaken landing followed an extended duration flight from Europe to Southwest Asia to embark military passengers before returning to the U.S. The USAF investigation attributed the incident to fatigue leading to pilot error, as both airfields' main runways share the same magnetic heading and are only four miles apart along the shore of Tampa Bay.
- On 9 April 2021, USAF C-17 10-0223 suffered a fire in its undercarriage after landing at Charleston AFB following a flight from RAF Mildenhall, UK. The fire spread to the fuselage before it was extinguished.

== Specifications (C-17A) ==
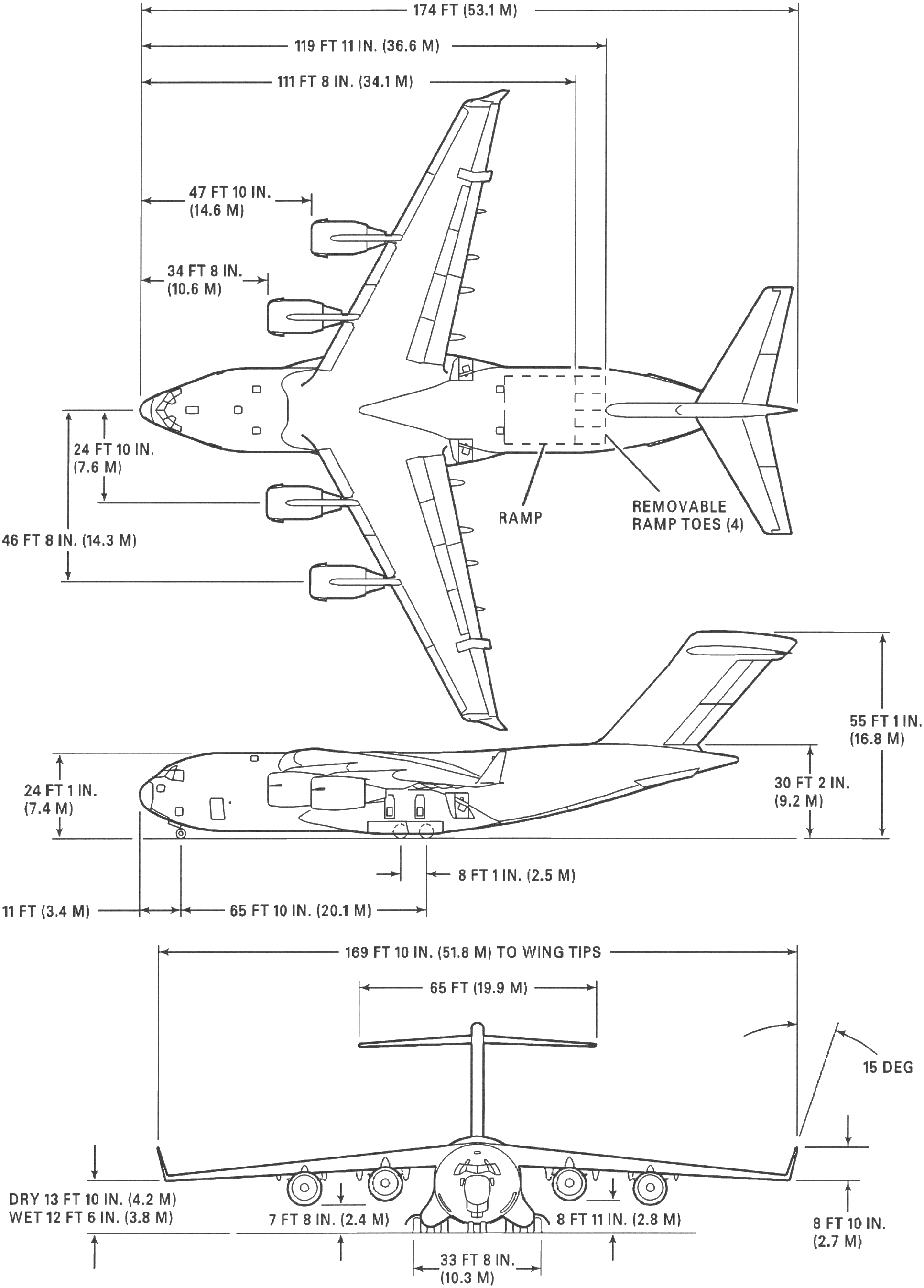
3-view line drawing of the McDonnell Douglas C-17A Globemaster III

Data from Brassey's World Aircraft & Systems Directory, U.S. Air Force fact sheet, Boeing

General characteristics

- Crew: 3 (2 pilots, 1 loadmaster)
- Capacity: 170,900 lb (77,519 kg) of cargo distributed at max over 18 463L master pallets or a mix of palletized cargo and vehicles
  - 102 paratroopers or
  - 134 troops with palletized and sidewall seats or
  - 54 troops with sidewall seats (allows 13 cargo pallets) only or
  - 36 litter and 54 ambulatory patients and medical attendants or
  - Cargo, such as one M1 Abrams tank, two Bradley armored vehicles, or three Stryker armored vehicles
- Length: 174 ft (53 m)
- Wingspan: 169 ft 9.6 in (51.755 m)
- Height: 55 ft 1 in (16.79 m)
- Wing area: 3,800 sq ft (350 m^{2})
- Aspect ratio: 7.165
- Airfoil: root: DLBA 142; tip: DLBA 147
- Empty weight: 282,500 lb (128,140 kg)
- Max takeoff weight: 585,000 lb (265,352 kg)
- Fuel capacity: 35,546 US gal (29,598 imp gal; 134,560 L)
- Powerplant: 4 × Pratt & Whitney PW2000 turbofan engines, 40,440 lbf (179.9 kN) thrust each (U.S. military designation: F117-PW-100)

Performance

- Cruise speed: 450 kn (520 mph, 830 km/h) (Mach 0.74–0.79)
- Range: 2,420 nmi (2,780 mi, 4,480 km) with 157,000 lb (71,214 kg) payload
- Ferry range: 6,230 nmi (7,170 mi, 11,540 km)
- Service ceiling: 45,000 ft (14,000 m)
- Wing loading: 150 lb/sq ft (730 kg/m^{2})
- Thrust/weight: 0.277 (minimum)
- Takeoff run at MTOW: 8,200 ft (2,499 m)
- Takeoff run at 395,000 lb (179,169 kg): 3,000 ft (914 m)
- Landing distance: 3,500 ft (1,067 m)

Avionics

- AlliedSignal AN/APS-133(V) weather and mapping radar

== See also ==
Related development

- McDonnell Douglas YC-15

Aircraft of comparable role, configuration, and era

- Lockheed C-5 Galaxy
- Antonov An-124 Ruslan
- Ilyushin Il-76
- Xi'an Y-20
- C-141 Starlifter

Related lists

- List of active Canadian military aircraft
- List of active United Kingdom military aircraft
- List of active United States military aircraft
