= Department of Defense container system =

Standardized means of packing goods for U.S. military logistics

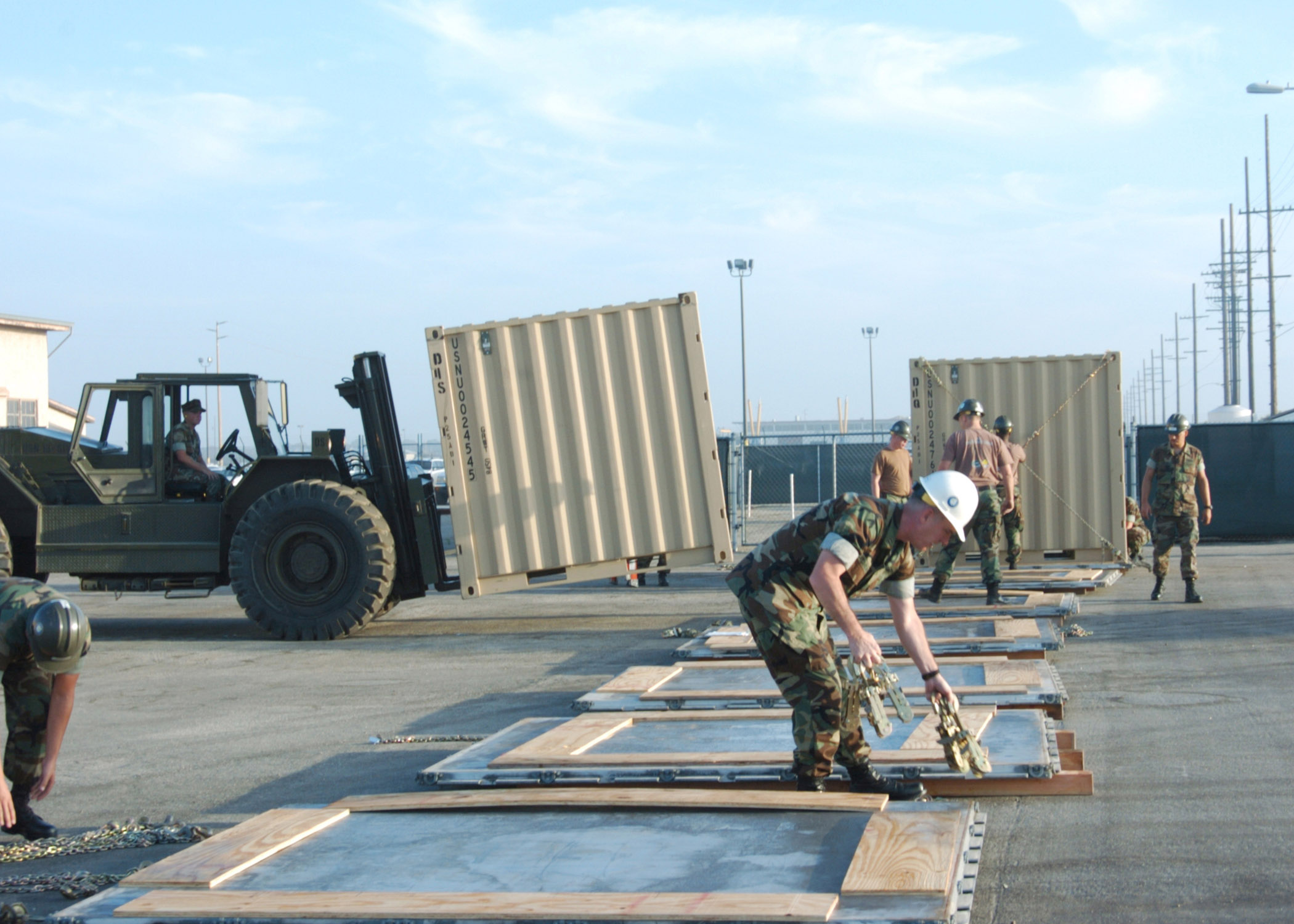
Preparing 463L pallets for the air transport of Tricon containers.

The Department of Defense container system comprises all U.S. Department of Defense-owned, leased, and controlled 20- or 40-foot intermodal ISO intermodal containers (shipping containers) and flatracks, supporting equipment such as generator sets and chassis, container handling equipment, information systems, and other infrastructure that supports DOD transportation and logistic operations, including commercially provided transportation services.

== Overview ==
This also includes 463L pallets, unit loads, ULDs, nets, and tie down equipment as integral components of the DOD Intermodal Container System.

The size and configuration of the common-use portion of the DOD container system controlled by the U.S. Transportation Command (USTRANSCOM), will be determined by USTRANSCOM based on established requirements and availability of commercially owned containers and equipment. USTRANSCOM will lease or procure additional containers as required to augment the DOD container system.

There are three categories of containers, government-owned, leased, and commercial carrier. The government-owned ones are registered in the DOD ISO registry within the Joint Container Management system (JCMS). The containers are used by the Army, Navy and Marine Corps.

In 1997, the Army released a new Field Manual (FM) for container operations which updated the existing Army policies and doctrine dating back to 1975.
