= 463L master pallet =

Pallet used for transporting military air cargo

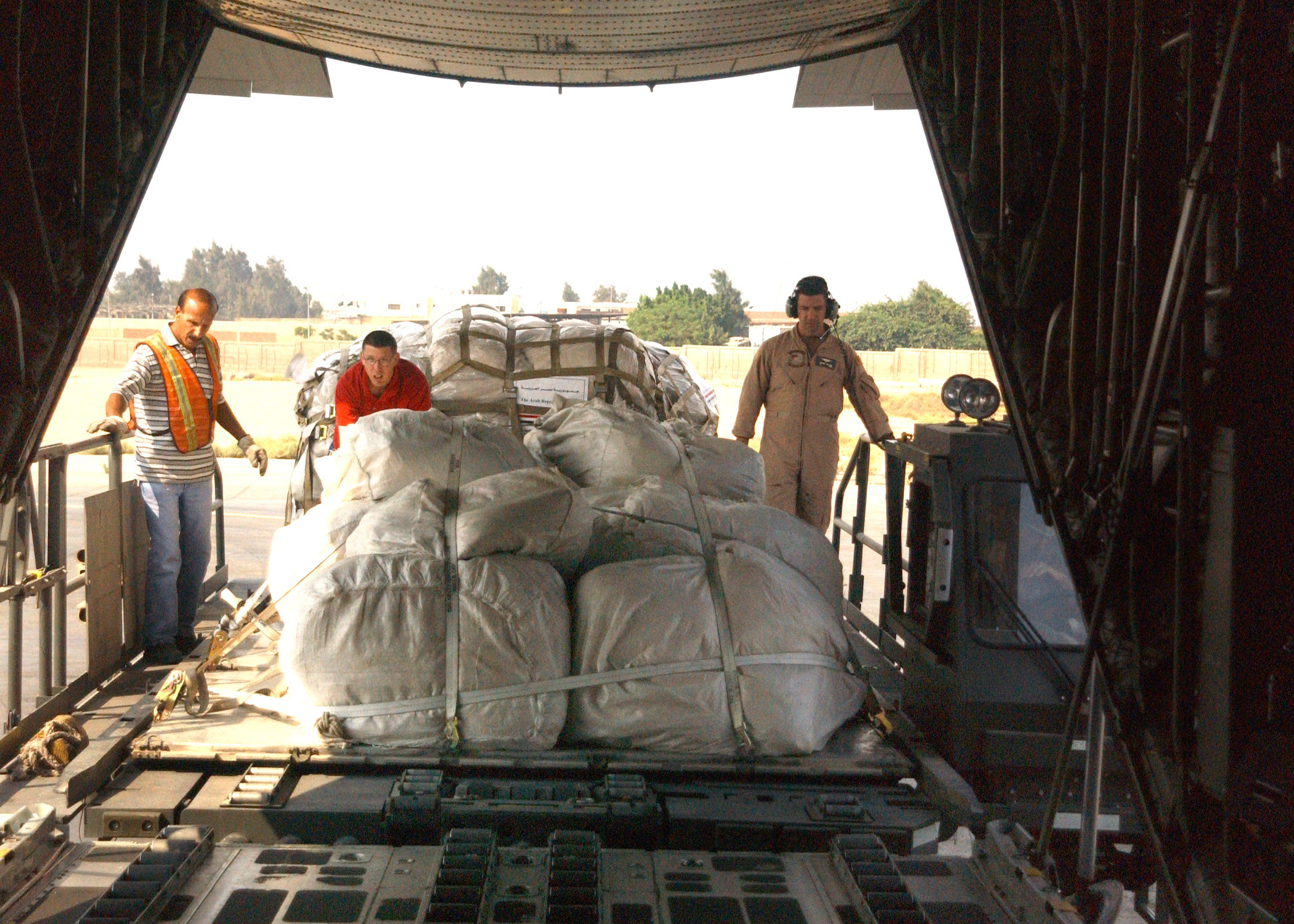
A 463L master pallet of humanitarian aid being loaded onto a U.S. Navy C-130T Hercules cargo aircraft

The HCU-6/E or 463L Master Pallet is a standardized pallet used for transporting military air cargo. It is the main air-cargo pallet of the United States Air Force, designed to be loaded and offloaded on today's military airlifters as well as many civilian Civil Reserve Air Fleet (CRAF) cargo aircraft.

== Description ==
The "SS-463L" project was developed by a U.S. Air Force committee in 1957 and awarded to the Douglas Aircraft Company in 1959. The "SS-463L Pallet Cargo Handling System" specifications for aircraft (aka "463L") included a "Master Pallet" design to meet a component of the material handling specifications of this system. The "Master Pallet" was contracted to the AAR Cadillac Manufacturing Corporation, at one time AAR Cadillac Corp, and now AAR Corp.

In the 1950s, the U.S. Air Force used a standard designation system for all awarded projects. The "SS" represents Support System, the "463" represents an assigned general system category, 400–499 series for "Support Systems", and the suffix "L" also represents "Support Systems". The "463L" does not stand for the period that the pallet was initiated (April 1963); it is the name of the system.

The standard HCU-6/E pallet in the "463L" system was designed and finalized in the early 1960s by the AAR Cadillac Corp. to implement the "SS-463L Pallet Cargo Handling System" now known as "Materials Handling Support System "463L"". The original design of the HCU-6/E pallet met the standards of the Universal Cargo Handling Rail System design in 1962 for the Lockheed C-130 Hercules and Lockheed C-141 Starlifter transport aircraft. The new sturdy HCU-6/E pallet was a drastic improvement to the older lightweight balsa wood pallets used by the Air Force in previous years.

Each HCU-6/E pallet is 88 inches (220 cm) wide, 108 inches (270 cm) long, and 2 1/4 inches (5.7 cm) high. The usable space is 84 by 104 in (210 by 260 cm). It can hold up to 10,000 lb (4,500 kg) of cargo (not exceeding 250 lb per square inch) at 8 g. Empty, each pallet weighs 290 pounds (130 kg), or 355 pounds (161 kg) with two side nets and a top net.

Based on the HCU-6/E air cargo Master Pallet, additional components include the HCU-7/E side net, the HCU-15/C top net, and the CGU-1/B Device or cargo strap. MB-1 Devices or MB-2 Devices may be used with appropriate chains.

The "463L Master Pallets" can be unloaded on the ground in peacetime or in combat.

They are built of a balsa wood core and surrounded by a thin aluminum skin. There are 22 tie-down rings surrounding the edge, each rated at 7,500 pounds (3,400 kg).

== Aircraft capabilities ==
Aircraft load rating of 463L master pallets
Aircraft	463LMP Capacity
AgustaWestland AW101	2
Sikorsky CH-53K King Stallion	2
Boeing CH-47 Chinook	3
CASA/IPTN CN-235*	4
EADS CASA C-295	5
Lockheed C-130 Hercules E/H models	6
Lockheed C-130 Hercules J-30 model	8
Embraer KC-390	7
Kawasaki C-2	8
Airbus A400M Atlas	9
Boeing 707	13
Lockheed C-141 Starlifter A model	10
Douglas DC-8-62	14
Douglas DC-8-63	18
Boeing C-17 Globemaster III**	18
Boeing KC-767	19
Boeing KC-46A	18
Boeing KC-135	6
McDonnell Douglas KC-10	30
Lockheed C-5 Galaxy	36
Boeing 747	42
Antonov 124	36

* Including one on the ramp

** 11 in centerline configuration

== See also ==
- Unit Load Device (ULD), lightweight aluminium and plastic pallet or container, designed for commercial aircraft.
- Department of Defense container system
