= Risco =

Risco may refer to:

== People ==
- Alcides Risco (born 1953), Cuban rower
- Cecilia del Risco (born 1960), Peruvian volleyball player
- Claudio Rîșco (born 1978), Romanian boxer
- Gonzalo Rodríguez Risco (born 1972), Peruvian playwright and screenwriter
- Jonay Risco (born 1987), Spanish kickboxer
- Juan Manuel Vargas Risco (born 1983), Peruvian football player
- Luis Miguel del Risco (born 1989), Italo-Colombian football player
- Manuel Risco, Spanish historian
- Rafael Risco (1945–2021), Peruvian footballer
- Vicente Risco (1884–1963), Galician intellectual

== Places ==
- Risco, Badajoz, Spain
- Risco, Missouri, United States
- Valle del Risco, Panama

== Other ==
- risco is the Spanish word for "cliff"
