= Robert Brisco (disambiguation) =

Robert Brisco (1928–2004) was a Canadian politician.

Robert or Bob Briscoe may also refer to:

- Robert P. Briscoe (1897–1968), United States Admiral
- Robert Briscoe (politician) (1894–1969), Irish politician
- Bob "Bulldog" Briscoe, character in Frasier
- Sir Robert Brisco, Baronet of the Brisco baronets

== See also ==
- Robert Brisco Earée (1846–1928), English priest and philatelist
- Brisco (disambiguation)
