= Luis Miguel del Risco =

Italo-Colombian footballer (born 1989)

Personal information
- Full name: Luis Miguel del Risco Torres
- Date of birth: September 7, 1989 (age 37)
- Place of birth: Barranquilla, Colombia
- Height: 1.82 m (6 ft 0 in)
- Position: Defender

Team information
- Current team: Expreso Rojo
- Number: 4

Youth career
- 2006–2007: Millonarios

Senior career*
Years	Team	Apps	(Gls)
2008–2010	Millonarios	6	(0)
2013–present	Expreso Rojo		
- * Club domestic league appearances and goals as of February 25, 2010

Luis Miguel del Risco Torres (born September 7, 1989) is a professional Italo-Colombian soccer player. He currently plays as a defender for Expreso Rojo.

== Club career ==
From 2008 to 2010, he played for Millionarios in the Copa Mustang.
