= Anne Briscoe =

American biochemist

- Born: January 12, 1918
- Died: April 16, 2014 (aged 96)

Anne M. Briscoe (December 1, 1918 – April 16, 2014) was an American biochemist and activist promoting women in science.

She was educated at Adelphi University and Vassar College before receiving her PhD in biochemistry in 1949 from Yale University. Briscoe died at the age of 95 in 2014.

== Career ==
Briscoe was a faculty member and medical researcher in biochemistry, holding positions in a number of departments including Cornell University and the Perelman School of Medicine at the University of Pennsylvania. Her primary focus was research, with a focus on the metabolism of calcium and magnesium in humans. Briscoe was elected a fellow of the American Institute of Chemists and the New York Academy of Sciences and in 1997 received the Wilbur L. Cross Medal from the Yale Graduate School of Arts and Sciences.

Briscoe was also active as an advocate for women in the sciences; she was a founding member of the Association for Women in Science for which she served as president between 1974 and 1976, and published a number of books on women, feminism, and science. On August 1, 1979, Briscoe represented the Association for Women in Science in testifying in favour of a "women in science" bill in 1979. She supported bill S. 568 to the Subcommittee on Health and Scientific Research for the Women in Science and Technology Equal Opportunity Act that was introduced by Senator Edward M. Kennedy.
