= Wally Bristowe =

Australian rules footballer

Personal information
- Full name: Wallace Handley Bristowe
- Born: 27 April 1922; Myrtleford, Victoria
- Died: 1 March 2013 (aged 90)
- Original team: Carnegie
- Height: 182 cm (6 ft 0 in)
- Weight: 76 kg (168 lb)

Playing career^{1}
Years	Club	Games (Goals)
1940–42	Hawthorn	11 (4)
1944–45	Fitzroy	18 (14)
Total		29 (18)
- ^{1} Playing statistics correct to the end of 1945.

Wallace Handley Bristowe (27 April 1922 – 1 March 2013) was a former Australian rules footballer who played with Hawthorn and Fitzroy in the Victorian Football League (VFL).

== Personal life ==
Bristowe served as a sergeant in the Royal Australian Air Force during the Second World War.
