= Brisco =

Brisco may refer to:

- Brisco (surname)
- Brisco, British Columbia, an unincorporated community in Canada
- Brisco, Cumbria, a community in Cumbria, England
- Brisco, Indiana, an extinct town in Warren County, Indiana, United States
- Biblical Research Institute Science Council (BRISCO), a Seventh-day Adventist group
- Brisco, lead character in The Adventures of Brisco County, Jr., a 1993 American TV show
- Brisco (rapper), real name British Alexander Mitchell
- Brisco baronets

== See also ==
- Briscoe (disambiguation)
