= Bristo W. Reese =

American politician

Bristo W. Reese was a state legislator in Alabama. He served in the Alabama House of Representatives succeeding R. L. Bennett, who died, to represent Hale County, Alabama. He served from 1873 to 1875.

He co-signed with other Republican members of the Alabama House a memorial sent to the U.S. Congress detailing alleged abuses by Democrats and their White League allies.

He is listed among the Reconstruction era African American legislators in Alabama commemorated in a historical marker.

== See also ==
- African American officeholders from the end of the Civil War until before 1900
