= Bristow =

Bristow, or Bristowe, can refer to the following.

== People ==
- Bristow (surname)
- W.S. Bristowe (1901–1979), English naturalist
- Eric Bristow (1957-2018), English former professional darts player, nicknamed "The Crafty Cockney"

== Places ==
=== In the United States ===
- Bristow, Indiana
- Bristow, Iowa
- Bristow, Mississippi
- Bristow, Missouri
- Bristow, Nebraska
- Bristow, Oklahoma
- Bristow, Virginia

=== In the United Kingdom ===
- An archaic variant spelling of Bristol

== Companies ==
- Bristow Helicopters, a British helicopter airline

== Fictional characters ==
- Bristow (cartoon), British strip cartoon character
- Sydney Bristow

== See also ==
- Bristo (disambiguation)
