= Champneys (surname) =

Champneys is a surname, and may refer to:

- Arthur Champneys (c. 1658 – 1724), English merchant and politician
- A. M. Champneys (1888–1966), British novelist and poet
- Basil Champneys (1842–1935), British architect and author
- Benjamin Champneys (1800–1871), American lawyer, judge, and legislator
- Francis Champneys (1848–1930), British obstetrician
- John Champneys (1495–1566), English merchant and Lord Mayor of London
- John Champneys (religious radical) (died in or after 1559), English religious radical.
- Norma Dalrymple-Champneys (1902–1997), British literary scholar
- Weldon Champneys (1832–1892), English clergyman and rower
- Weldon Dalrymple-Champneys (1892–1980), British physician
- William Weldon Champneys (1807–1875), English Anglican priest

== See also ==
- Champney
