= John Briscoe =

Jack or John Brisco or Briscoe may refer to:

- John Briscoe (water engineer) (1948–2014), South African-born environmental engineer
- Jack Brisco (1941–2010), American wrestler
- Jack Briscoe (born 1991), English rugby league player
- John Briscoe (baseball) (born 1967), American baseball player
- John Ivatt Briscoe (1791–1870), English politician
- John Parran Briscoe (1853–1925), American judge
- Johnny Briscoe, American exonerated by DNA evidence
- Sir John Briscoe, 1st Baronet (1836–1919)
  - Sir John Charlton Briscoe, 3rd Baronet (1874–1960) of the Briscoe baronets
  - Sir John Leigh Charlton Briscoe, 4th Baronet (1911–1993) of the Briscoe baronets
  - Sir (John) James Briscoe, 5th Baronet (1951–1994) of the Briscoe baronets
  - Sir John Geoffrey James Briscoe, 6th Baronet (born 1994) of the Briscoe baronets

== See also ==
- Brisco (disambiguation)
- Briscoe (disambiguation)
