= Vernon Storr =

Anglican priest and Archdeacon of Westminster

Vernon Faithfull Storr (4 December 1869 – 25 October 1940) was an Anglican priest, most notably Archdeacon of Westminster from 1931 to 1936.

== Early life and education ==
The son of Edward Storr (1840–1878), Indian Civil Service (a descendant of the goldsmith and silversmith Paul Storr, through which his cousins included Rev. Frank Utterton, Archdeacon of Surrey from 1906 to 1908, the obstetrician Sir Francis Champneys, 1st Baronet and his brothers Basil Champneys and Weldon Champneys, the artists Rex Whistler and Laurence Whistler, and the academic Michael Lindsay, 2nd Baron Lindsay of Birker) and Emily Mary (née Faithfull), Storr was born at Madras. He was educated at Clifton College and The Queen's College, Oxford - he was the Aubrey Moore Student in 1893. Storr was a fellow of University College, Oxford, from 1895 to 1899; and then again from 1905 to 1913.

== Ordained ministry ==
Storr was ordained deacon in 1900, and priest in 1901. His first post was a curacy in Haslemere. He was Rector of Bramshott from 1902 to 1905; and of Headbourne Worthy from 1905 to 1910. He was a Canon Residentiary at Winchester Cathedral from 1910 to 1916; Rector of Bentley from 1916 to 1921; and a Canon of Westminster from 1921. Additionally in 1936 he became Rector of St Margaret's, Westminster and Sub-Dean of the abbey.

== Theistic evolution ==
Vernon Storr was an advocate of theistic evolution. In 1940, he wrote:

"There need be no opposition between evolution and theism. The old argument from Design, as Paley stated it, is undoubtedly dead; but evolution is not the enemy of design, but requires design for its adequate explanation."

== Selected works ==
Carnegie was an author. Amongst others he wrote:

- Development and Divine Purpose, 1906
- The Development of English Theology in the 19th Century, 1800–1860, 1913
- Christianity and Immortality, 1918
- The Problem of the Cross, 1919
- The Argument from Design, 1920
- The Missionary Genius of the Bible, 1924
- The Living God, 1925
- From Abraham to Christ,1927)
- Freedom and Tradition, 1940

Church of England titles
Preceded by Robert Charles	Archdeacon of Westminster; 1931–1936	Succeeded by Frederic Donaldson
