= Champneys (disambiguation) =

Champneys is an English country house near Wigginton, Hertfordshire, run as a "destination spa", and the brand name of the associated chain of spas.

Champneys may also refer to:

- Champneys, Newfoundland and Labrador, a community in Canada
- Champneys baronets, two baronetcies created for persons with the surname Champneys
  - Mostyn-Champneys baronets, a title in the Baronetage of Great Britain
  - Dalrymple-Champneys baronets, a title in the Baronetage of the United Kingdom

== People ==
- Champneys (surname)

== See also ==
- Champney, a surname
