= Frank Utterton =

Rev Canon Frank Ernest Utterton (baptised 4 October 1844 – 19 April 1908) was Archdeacon of Surrey from 1906 until 1908, then the second most senior post in the Diocese of Winchester.

The son of Bishop John Sutton Utterton and Eleanor, daughter of the goldsmith and silversmith Paul Storr, he was born in Holmwood, Surrey and educated at New College, Oxford, where he matriculated in 1863, and graduated B.A. in 1866. He was ordained in 1868, and began his ecclesiastical career with a curacy in Farnham, Surrey. He was Curate-in-charge of Frensham from 1870 to 1874; Rector of the village parish, Seale from 1874 to 1876; and Vicar of the multi-church parish and town of Leatherhead from 1876.

He died in Winchester, aged 63.

First cousins on his mother's side were Sir Francis Champneys, 1st Baronet, and his brothers Basil Champneys and Weldon Champneys; also close relatives through the Storr family were Rev. Vernon Storr, Archdeacon of Westminster from 1931 to 1936, the academic Michael Lindsay, 2nd Baron Lindsay of Birker, and the artists Rex Whistler and his brother Laurence Whistler.
