= Campany =

Campany is an English surname of Norman origin, derived from Old French Champeneis (denoting someone from Champagne). It is a variant of the surname Champney.

Notable people with the surname include:

- David Campany, British writer, curator, artist and educator
- Ivy Campany (1901–2008), British World War I veteran

== See also ==
- Company
