= Francis Champneys =

Sir Francis Henry Champneys FRCP
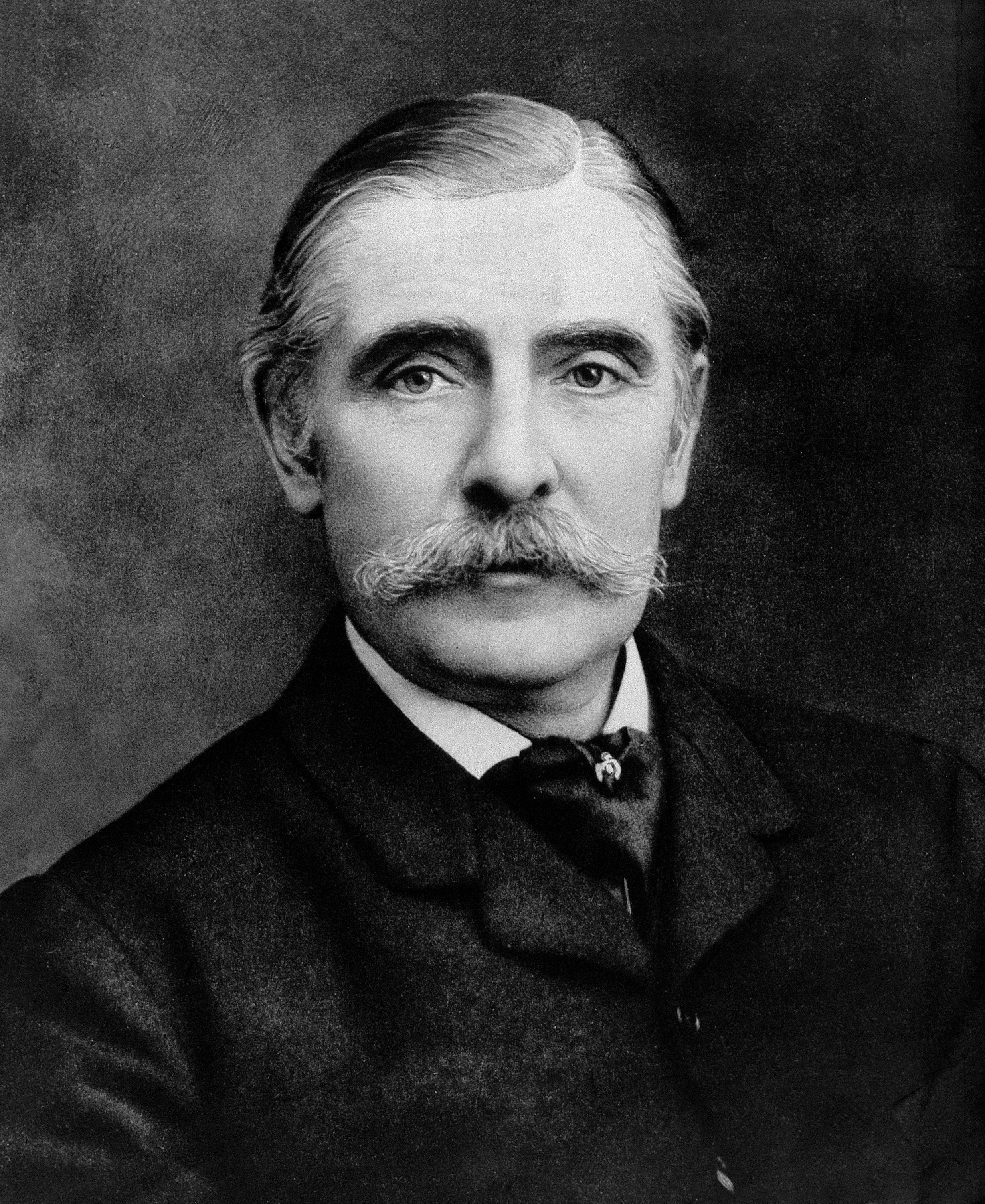
- Born: 25 March 1848; Whitechapel, London, England
- Died: 30 July 1930 (aged 82); Nutley, Sussex, England
- Education: Brasenose College; St Bartholomew's Hospital
- Known for: Raising the status of midwives Founding the History of Medicine Society at Royal Society of Medicine Crown nominee of GMC 1911–1926
- Scientific career
- Fields: physician, obstetrician and historian

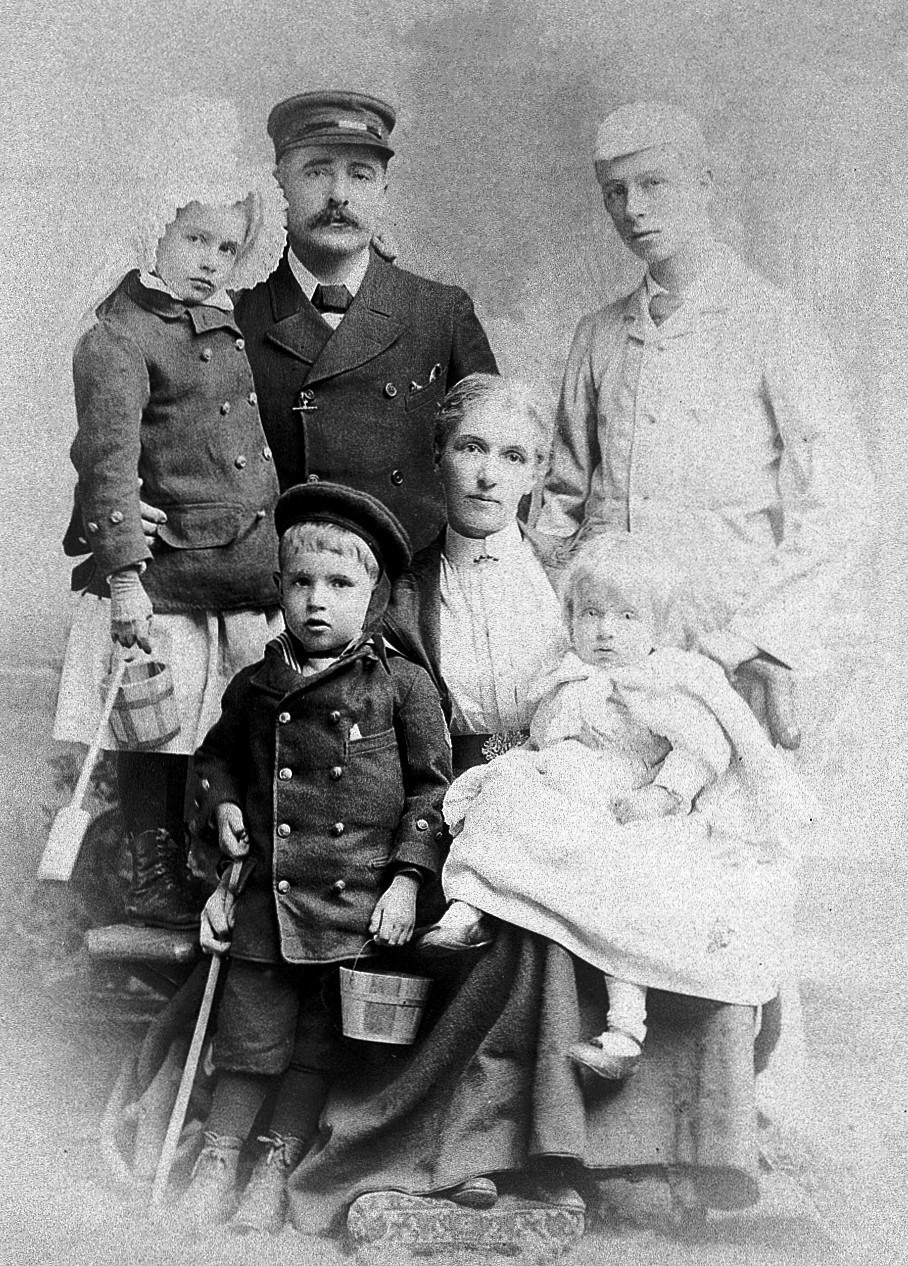
Francis Champneys with family in 1862

Sir Francis Henry Champneys, 1st Baronet, FRCP (25 March 1848 in London – 30 July 1930 in Nutley, Sussex, England) was an eminent obstetrician known for raising the status of midwives in the early twentieth century, by his campaigning for their training and certification and for supporting the founding of the History of Medicine Society in 1912.

== Early years ==
Champneys was born in the rectory of St Mary's, Whitechapel on 25 March 1848. His father was William Champneys, then rector of St Mary's, later Canon of St Paul's Cathedral and later Dean of Lichfield from 1868 to 1875, and his mother, Mary Anne, was daughter of the goldsmith and silversmith Paul Storr (his cousins thus including Rev. Vernon Storr, Archdeacon of Westminster from 1931 to 1936, Rev. Frank Utterton, Archdeacon of Surrey from 1906 to 1908, the artists Rex Whistler and Laurence Whistler, and the academic Michael Lindsay, 2nd Baron Lindsay of Birker).

Among his six siblings were the architect and author Basil Champneys and the rowing clergyman Weldon Champneys. As a child and before the invention of perforation, Champneys would spend Sunday afternoons cutting sheets of stamps. He was awarded a scholarship to be educated at Winchester College, one of the ancient public schools of England, and later Brasenose College, Oxford. He then, in 1871, became a medical student at St Bartholomew's Hospital, qualifying in 1888.

== Career ==
Champneys was a fellow of the Royal Medical and Chirurgical Society and was elected president of its successor organisation, the Royal Society of Medicine, in 1912. He supported Sir William Osler in the founding of The History of Medicine Society at The Royal Society of Medicine, London, in the same year.

== Legacy ==
Champneys particularly championed raising the status of midwives and was the main driving force of the Midwives Act 1902, which he did by being the first chairman of the Central Midwives’ Board from 1902 until his death in 1930. The act required midwives to be trained and examined in a maternity hospital. They then had to be on the register of the central midwives board.

He was the crown nominee from 1911 to 1926 of the General Medical Council. Champneys was created a baronet in 1910.

== Music ==
Champneys was an amateur musician, studying under Charles Wesley at Winchester. Whilst at Brasenose, Champneys composed a number of glees and madrigals, founding at the same time, a glees club. Later, he was to study music under John Goss (composer) and held various musical positions between 1880 and 1913.

== Personal life and death ==
Champneys married Virginia Julian Dalrymple (1850-1922), daughter of Sir John Warrender Dalrymple, on 12 September 1876.

He died on 31 July 1930 at age 83 years at his Nutley home and was succeeded by his son, Weldon Dalrymple-Champneys, who also became a physician. Weldon never had children and the baronetcy therefore ended.

Baronetage of the United Kingdom
| New creation | Baronet (of Littlemeads in the County of Sussex); 1910–1930 | Succeeded by Weldon Dalrymple-Champneys |
