= Simon Whistler =

British glass engraver and musician

Simon Whistler (10 September 1940 – 18 April 2005) was a British glass engraver and violinist.

== Biography ==
=== Early life and education ===
Simon Whistler was born on 10 September 1940 in Barnstaple, Devon. He came from a highly artistic family. He was the son of poet and glass engraver Sir Laurence Whistler and actress Jill Furse, nephew of war artist Rex Whistler, and he was related to the poets Sir Henry Newbolt and Sir Joshua Reynolds. When he was 4, Whistler's mother died. Whistler began learning engraving under his father and first engraved a violin on a mug at the age of 10. He was educated at Magdalen College School, Oxford where he was a chorister and later attended the Royal Academy of Music.

=== Career ===
In 1962, he first began exhibiting engraved glass at Royal Festival Hall. His work would be exhibited with his father and others at venues including Kettle's Yard, Corning Museum of Glass and the Ashmolean Museum. He created works that blended music and engraving such as his 1965 Lark Ascending work inspired by Ralph Vaughan Williams. He also frequently engraved landscapes, inspired by artists such as John Sell Cotman and J. M. W. Turner.

He created commemorative works such as Armada scenes for Buckland Abbey and installed memorial and church windows including Thomas Hardy window in St Juliot Church in 2003 and windows at All Saints Church, West Lavington. He engreaved a presentation dish for Queen Elizabeth II for her Golden Jubilee.

=== Later years and death ===
In his later years he was affected by a motor neuron disease which eventually prevented him from engraving. He published an autobiography, On A Glass Lightly in 2004. He died on 18 April 2005 and was buried at All Saint's Church in West Lavington on 26 April 2005.

== Personal life ==
He married Australian musician Jennifer Helsham in 1971 and they divorced in 1994. In 1997, he married violinist Margaret Faultless.

== Bibliography ==
- On A Glass Lightly (2004)
