= Utterton =

Utterton is a surname. Notable people with the surname include:

- Frank Utterton (1844–1908), Archdeacon of Surrey
- John Utterton, Bishop of Guildford
