= Edward Bickersteth (Dean of Lichfield) =

English Anglican priest

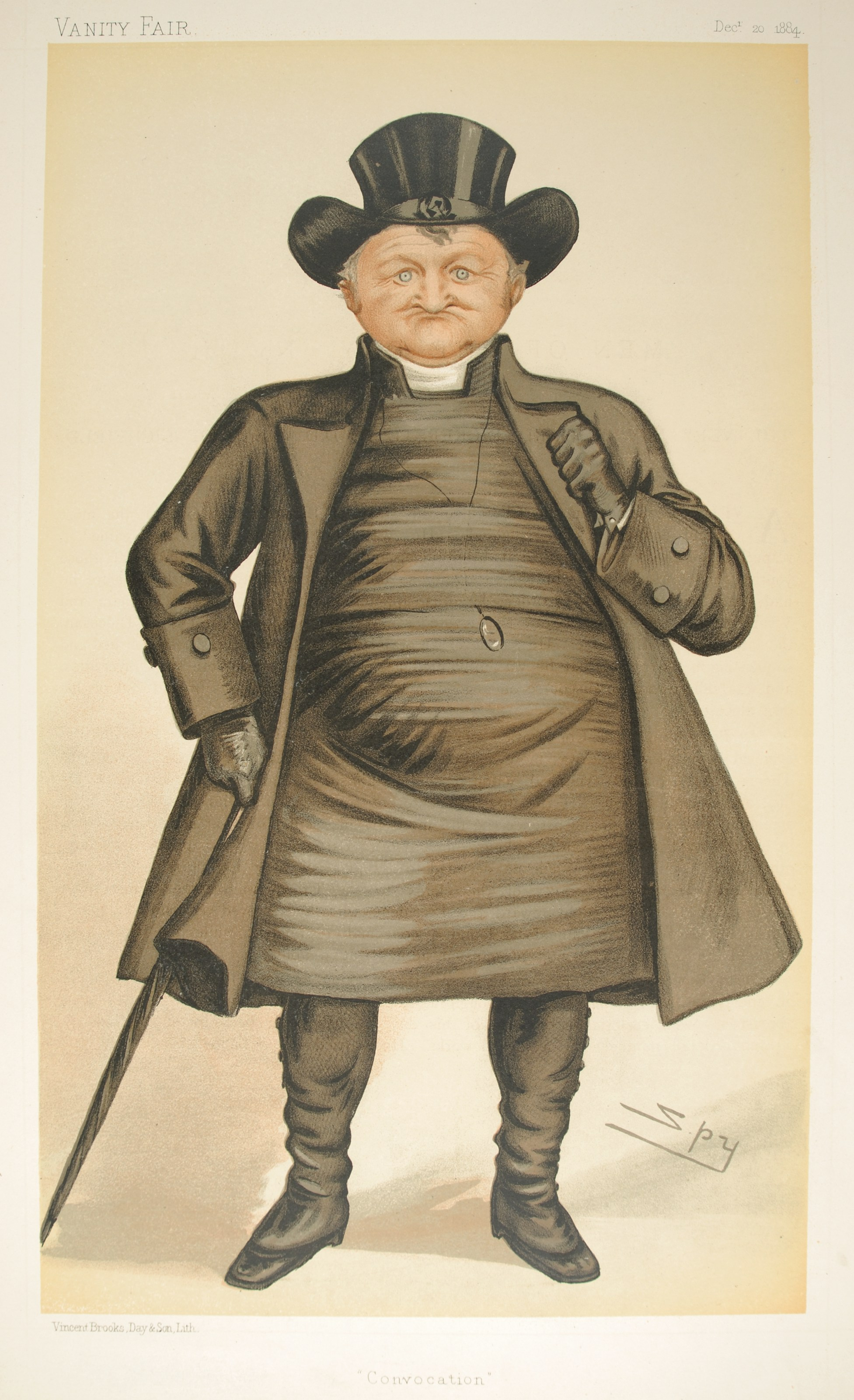
Vanity Fair caricature by "Spy", 1884

Edward Bickersteth (23 October 1814 – 7 October 1892) was an Anglican priest in the 19th century.

== Life ==
Edward Bickersteth was born in Acton into a remarkable ecclesiastical family, the second son of John Bickersteth, sometime Rector of Sapcote. His brother Robert was Bishop of Ripon. His uncle was Edward Bickersteth and Edward Henry Bickersteth, Bishop of Exeter, was his cousin. Another uncle, a prominent barrister, was raised to the peerage as Baron Langdale, while his nephew Robert Bickersteth was a Liberal MP. He was admitted to Trinity College, Cambridge, in 1831, and migrated to Sidney Sussex College two years later, graduating B.A. in 1836. He also studied at Durham University in 1837. Made deacon in 1837 and ordained priest in 1839, he began his career with curacies at Chetton and Shrewsbury Abbey. He was incumbent of Penn before being appointed Archdeacon of Buckingham and Vicar of Aylesbury in 1853. In 1875, he was appointed Dean of Lichfield. His chief achievement as Dean was the restoration of the west front of Lichfield Cathedral, which was begun in 1877 and completed and dedicated on 9 May 1884. He resigned just a few weeks before his death on 9 October 1892.

== Family ==
He was twice married: first, on 13 October 1840, to Martha Mary Anne, daughter of Valentine Vickers of Cransmere in Shropshire. She died on 2 February 1881, and on 12 October 1882, he married Mary Anne, daughter of Thomas Whitmore Wylde-Browne of The Woodlands, Bridgnorth, Shropshire. She survived him. There were no surviving children from either marriage.

== Works ==
He also published:

- The conscience clause: a letter to His Grace the Duke of Marlborough . London: Rivingtons. 1867.
- Diocesan Synods in relation to Convocation and Parliament, London, 1867, 8vo; 2nd edit. 1883.
- My Hereafter, London, 1883, 16mo.

He edited the fifth edition of The Bishopric of Souls (London, 1877, 8vo), with a memoir of the author, Robert Wilson Evans, and in 1882 contributed an exposition on St. Mark's Gospel to the Pulpit Commentary.

Church of England titles
Preceded by Justly Hill	Archdeacons of Buckingham; 1853 –1875	Succeeded by Arthur Purey-Cust
Preceded by William Champneys	Dean of Lichfield; 1875 –1892	Succeeded by Herbert Mortimer Luckock
