= Norma Dalrymple-Champneys =

British scholar of English literature and librarian

Lady Norma Dalrymple-Champneys (née Norma Hull Lewis; also known as Norma Hull Hodgson, Norma Russell; 8 October 1902, London – 21 December 1997, Oxford) was a British scholar of English literature, a librarian at Somerville College, Oxford, an honorary fellow of Oriel College, Oxford, and a winner of the British Academy's Rose Mary Crawshay Prize for 1990.

== Life ==
Norma Hull Lewis was born in London in 1902. Her father, R. Hull Lewis, was a colonel in the British Army's Royal Engineers. She attended Blackheath High School and Oxford High School, and in 1921 joined Somerville College to read modern history. In 1927, she obtained a diploma in librarianship in 1927 from University College, London.

In 1928, Lewis started working at the League of Nations Union. She married John Edmund Hodgson in 1933. He was a co-proprietor of a book auction house, where she began cataloguing rare and antiquarian books. During the Second World War, she worked at the Ministry of Information as Senior Press Censor for books and periodicals. Hodgson died in 1952, whereupon she began work at the House of Commons Library; later the same year, she joined Somerville College as Librarian. She continued in this role till 1969. In 1955, she was made a Research Fellow at the college, and one of its governors in 1965.

She married Dr Alexander Russell, previously faculty at Christ Church, Oxford, in 1956. She recruited him as an unofficial assistant at Somerville's library. He died in 1972. Two years later, she married Weldon Dalrymple-Champneys, who had been associated with Oriel College, becoming Lady Norma. He died in 1980 and she left several bequests in his memory to his college. In 1988, she was made an honorary fellow by Oriel. She was honoured as the Vice-President of the Grenadier Guards Association, Oxfordshire Branch, which had been her husband's regiment in the First World War. She received the Rose Mary Crawshay Prize for 1990.

Dalrymple-Champneys died in Oxford in 1997. She bequeathed a fund in her husband's and her name to Somerville College to promote the study of music in the college.

== Work ==
While working as a cataloguer at Hodgson's auctioneers, she helped with the selection of books for the Thomas Hardy memorial room in Dorchester after the death of Hardy's wife Florence Dugdale. With her access to private libraries, she was able to start her own research endeavours when she found the notebook of Thomas Bennet, a 17th-century bookseller in London, at the Sion House, publishing a co-edited work in 1956. She also published several pieces of literary or bibliographical research in the Modern Language Review.

At the Somerville College, she minded the large library, and published a well-received bibliography of William Cowper (1963), as well as editing the 4th revision of H. S. Milford's Cowper's Poetica (1967). The work she was best known for her three-volume edition of George Crabbe's The Complete Poetical Works' (1988), for which she won the Rose Mary Crawshay Prize in 1990.

== Selected works ==
- Hodgson, Norma H. (1938). "The Murder of Nicholas Turberville. Two Elizabethan Ballads". The Modern Language Review. 33 (4): 520–527. doi:10.2307/3715682. JSTOR 3715682.
- Hodgson, Norma; Blagden, Cyprian, eds. (1956). The notebook of Thomas Bennet and Henry Clements (1686-1719): With some aspects of book trade practice. Oxford Bibliographical Society.
- Russell, Norma (1963). A Bibliography of William Cowper to 1837. Oxford Bibliographical Society.
- Milford, H. S. (1967). Russell, Norma (ed.). Cowper's Poetical Works (4th ed.). Oxford University.
- Crabbe, George (1988). Pollard, Arthur; Dalrymple-Champneys, Norma (eds.). The Complete Poetical Works. Oxford English Texts. Clarendon.
