= Champneys baronets =

Set index for Champneys baronets

There have been two baronetcies created for persons with the surname Champneys, one in the Baronetage of Great Britain and one in the Baronetage of the United Kingdom. Both creations are extinct.

- Champneys, later Mostyn-Champneys baronets, of Orchardleigh (1767): see Mostyn-Champneys baronets
- Champneys, later Dalrymple-Champneys baronets, of Littlemeads (1910): see Dalrymple-Champneys baronets
