= Furse (surname) =

Furse is a Devon surname as well as one of several names for the evergreen shrub more widely known as gorse. The name is believed to be derived from Old English: fyrse (meaning "gorse"). The name is often compared to that of Furze that is also found in Cornwall. The first recorded Furse appears in the South-west circuit of the Domesday Book (known as the Exon Domesday) as Robert Furse.

== Some notable people named Furse ==
- Charles Wellington Furse (1868–1904), British painter; contributor to the New English Art Club
- Clara Furse (née Siemens), former CEO of the London Stock Exchange (LSE)
- Cynthia Furse (born 1963), American electrical engineer
- Elizabeth Furse (1936–2021), former member of Congress, Oregon First Congressional District 1992–1999)
- George Armand Furse (1834–1906), British Army officer, and author
- Jill Furse (1915–1944), English actress
- John H. Furse (1880–1907), American officer in the United States Navy
- Judith Furse (1912–1974), British character actress
- Dame Katharine Furse (GBE) (1875–1952), Director of the WRENS (1917-1919)
- Margaret Furse (1911–1974), English costume designer
- Patrick John Dolignon Furse (1918–2005), British artist/tutor in enamelling department (1959–83) at the London Central School of Art and Design
- Roger K. Furse (1903–1972), British film set/scene designer. Married to Margaret Furse (née Watts)

== The Furse family of Halsdon and Morshead ==
A notable family of the name Furse was resident on the estate of Halsdon in north Devon) from 1680 until the early 1980s, having previously resided at Morshead. Conclusive proof of lineage of the Furses of Halsdon in parish records can only be established from the late 17th century, when Philip Furse (1650-1720) acquired Halsdon from a maternal uncle. Various records held by the North Devon Record Office show the expansion of the estate, including title deeds for land at Alverdiscott, Ashreigny, Beaford, Bideford, Dolton, Fremington, Great Torrington, Hartland, High Bickington, Poughill, St Giles in the Wood, Weare Giffard, Winkleigh and Yarnscombe. The estate eventually became unsustainable, and was sold off during the 19th century, being finally broken up in 1983.

The house became owned by Charlie Watts, drummer of the Rolling Stones, whose wife Shirley bred Arabian horses on nearby land that was part of the estate throughout its history. The farms owned by the estate were sold to their tenants and remaining woodland donated to the Devon Wildlife Trust (Halsdon Nature Reserve).

The estate was photographed in the late 1970s and early 1980s by James Ravilious.
