= Paul Storr =

British silversmith (1770–1844)

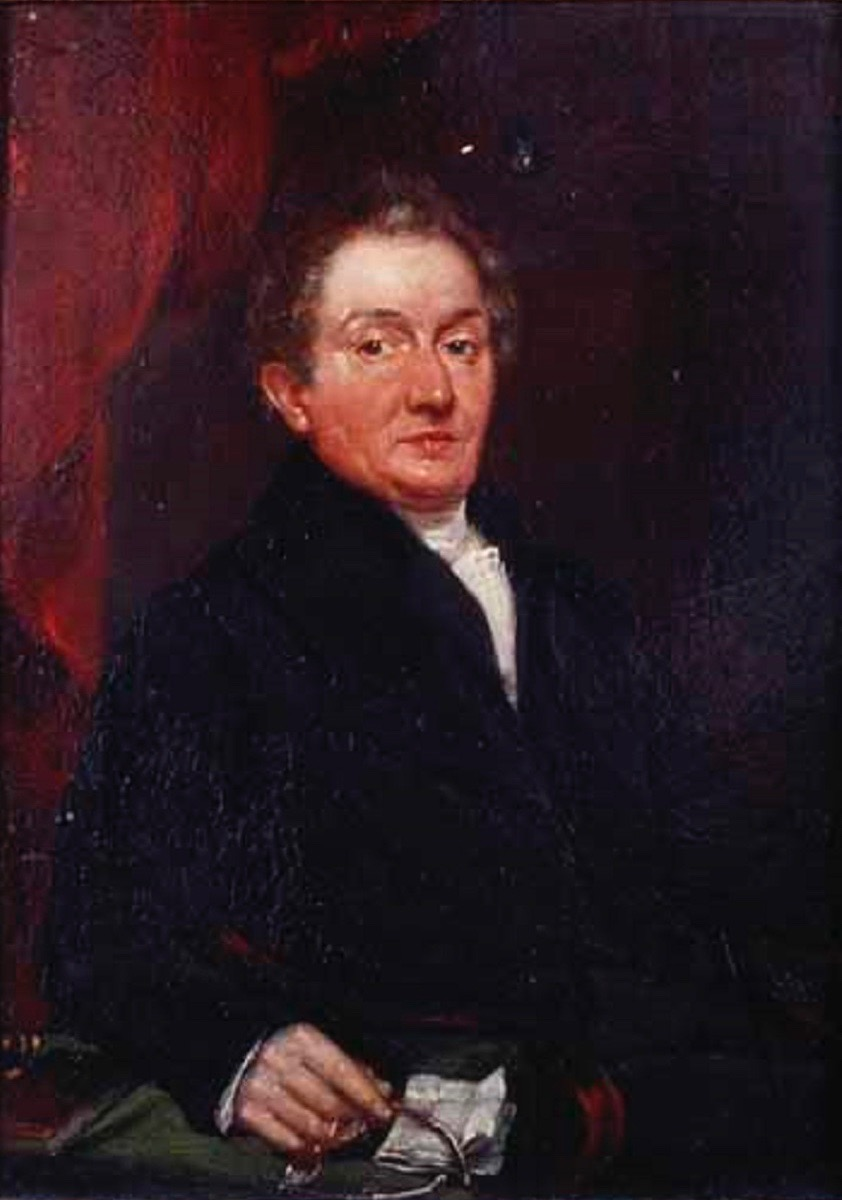
- 1845 portrait of Storr
- Baptised: 28 October 1770
- Died: 18 March 1844 (aged 73)
- Burial place: St Nicholas, Tooting, churchyard
- Monuments: St Mary's Church, Otley, Suffolk
- Education: Apprenticed to William Rock, a vintner
- Occupation: Silversmith
- Years active: 1784–1838
- Organization(s): Frisbee & Storr, 1792; Rundell & Bridge, 1807–19; Storr & Mortimer (1822–38)
- Spouse(s): Elizabeth Susanna Beyer (married 27 June 1801)
- Parent: Thomas Storr

Paul Storr (baptised 28 October 1770 in London – 18 March 1844 in London) was an English goldsmith and silversmith working in the Neoclassical and other styles during the late eighteenth and early nineteenth centuries. His works range from simple tableware to magnificent sculptural pieces made for royalty.

== Biography ==
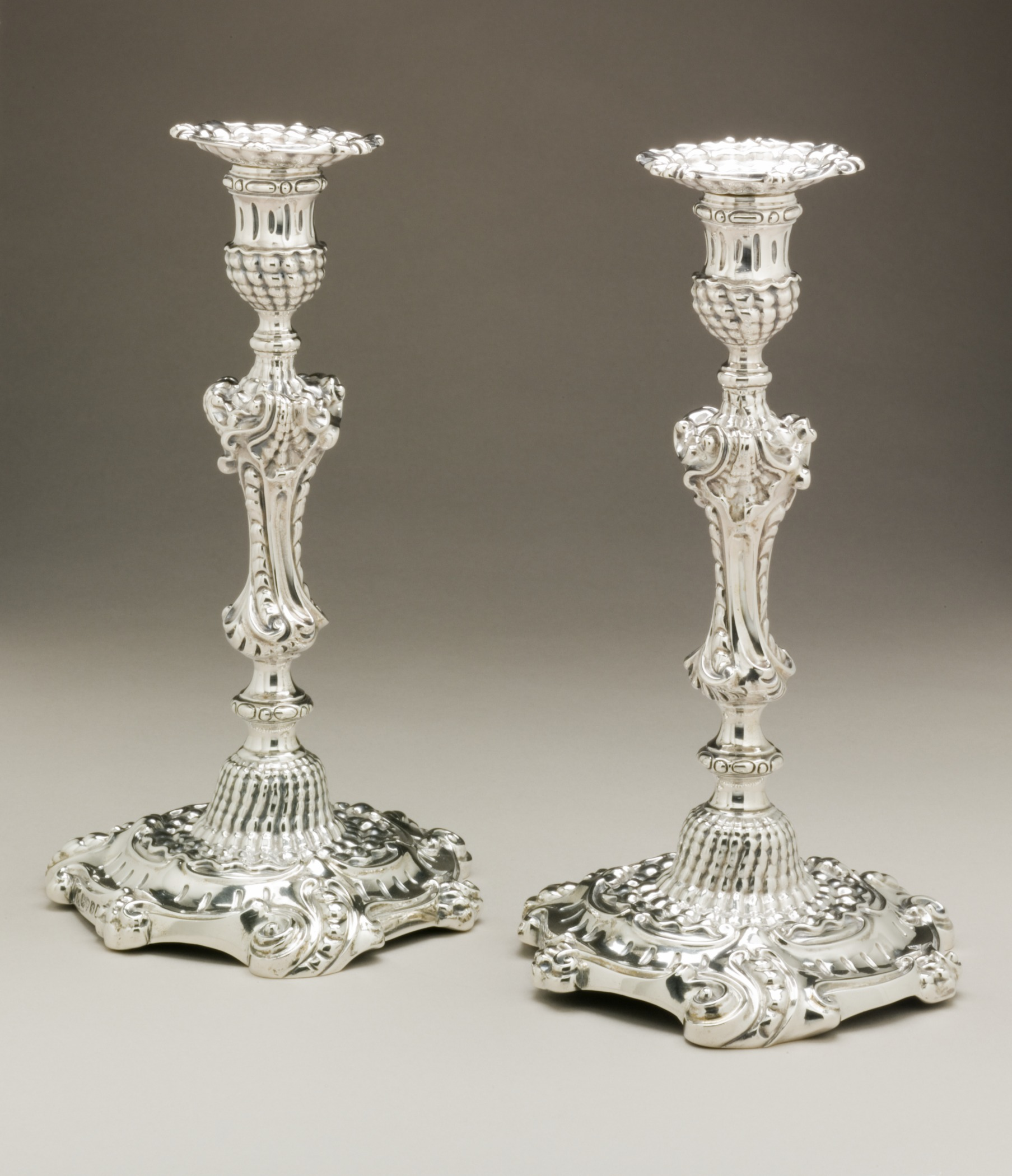
Pair of candlesticks, 1833–34, Los Angeles County Museum of Art

Paul Storr was England's most celebrated silversmith during the first half of the nineteenth century and his legacy lives on today. His pieces historically and currently adorn royal palaces and the finest stately homes throughout Europe and the world. Storr's reputation rests on his mastery of the grandiose neo-Classical style developed in the Regency period. He quickly became the most prominent silversmith of the nineteenth century, producing much of the silver purchased by King George III and King George IV. Storr entered his first mark in the first part of 1792, which reflects his short-lived partnership with William Frisbee. Soon after, he began to use his PS mark, which he maintained throughout his career with only minor changes. His first major work was a gold font commissioned by William Cavendish-Bentinck, 3rd Duke of Portland in 1797 and in 1799 he created the "Battle of the Nile Cup" for presentation to Lord Nelson.

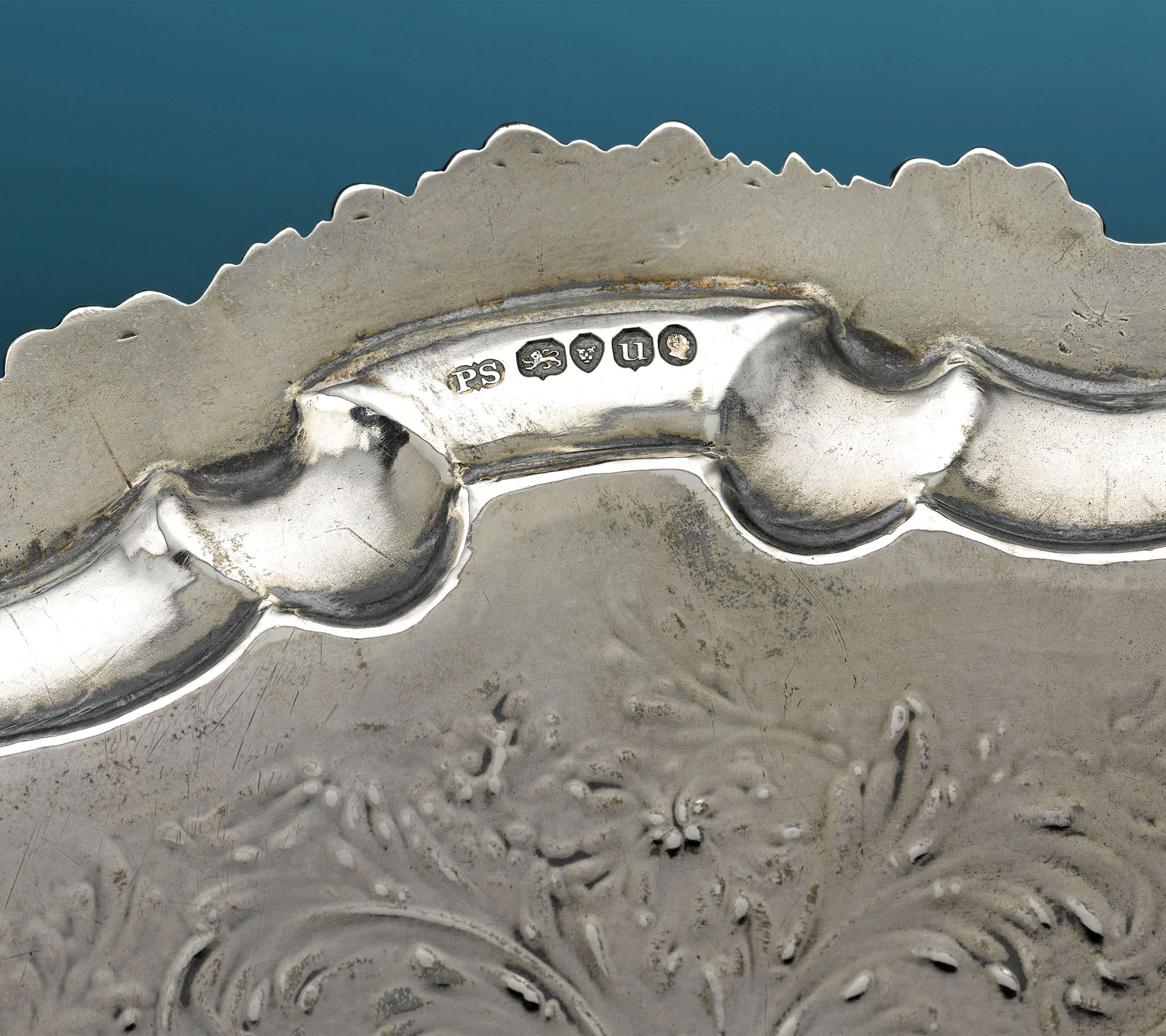
Detail of a William IV silver tray, showing the maker's mark of Paul Storr on the underside, London, 1835

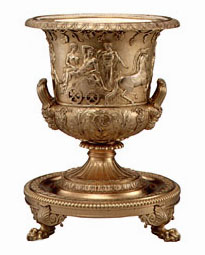
An 1810 silver-gilt wine-cooler with bas-relief frieze, Vermeil Room, White House

Much of Storr's success was due to the influence of Philip Rundell, of the popular silver retailing firm, Rundell, Bridge and Rundell. Rundell's firm nearly monopolised the early nineteenth-century market for superior silver and obtained the Royal Warrant in 1806. This shrewd businessman realised the talent of Paul Storr and began pursuing him in 1803, however it was not until 1807 that Storr finally joined the firm. After many years of working for Rundell, Storr realised he had lost much of his artistic freedom and by 1819 he left the firm to open his own shop, turning his attentions towards more naturalistic designs and soon began enjoying the patronage he desired. After only a few years of independence, Storr realised he needed a centralised retail location and partnered with John Mortimer, founding Storr and Mortimer in 1822 on New Bond Street.

Son of Thomas Storr of Westminster, first silver-chaser later innkeeper. Apprenticed c. 1785. Before his first partnership with William Frisbee in 1792 he worked in Church Street, Soho, which was the address of Andrew Fogelberg at which Storr's first separate mark is also entered.

- First mark entered as plateworker, in partnership with William Frisbee, 2 May 1792. Address: 5 Cock Lane, Snow Hill.
- Second mark alone, 12 January 1793. Address: 30 Church Street, Soho.
- Third mark, 27 April 1793.
- Fourth 8 August 1794. Moved to 20 Air Street, 8 October 1796, (where Thomas Pitts had worked till 1793).
- Fifth mark, 29 November 1799.
- Sixth, 21 August 1807. Address 53 Dean Street, Soho.
- Seventh, 10 February 1808.
- Eighth ?
- Ninth, 21 October 1813.
- Tenth, 12 September 1817. Moved to Harrison Street, Gray's Inn Road, 4 March 1819, after severing his connection with Rundell, Bridge and Rundell.
- Eleventh mark, 2 September 1883. Address: 17 Harrison Street.
- Twelfth and last mark, 2 September 1833.

Heal records him in partnership with Frisbee and alone at Cock Lane in 1792, and at the other addresses and dates above, except Harrison Street.

Storr married in 1801, Elizabeth Susanna Beyer of the Saxon family of piano and organ builders of Compton Street, by whom he had ten children. He retired in 1838, to live in Hill House in Tooting. He died 18 March 1844 and is buried in the churchyard of St Nicholas, Tooting. His will, proved 3 April 1844, shows an estate of £3,000.

There is a memorial to him at the church of St Mary, Otley, Suffolk put up in 1845 by his son the Rev. Francis Storr, the incumbent.

His descendants include the artists Rex Whistler and Laurence Whistler, Rev. Vernon Storr, Archdeacon of Westminster from 1931 to 1936, Rev. Frank Utterton, Archdeacon of Surrey from 1906 to 1908, the academic Michael Lindsay, 2nd Baron Lindsay of Birker, and the obstetrician Sir Francis Champneys, 1st Baronet and his brothers Basil and Weldon.

== His works ==
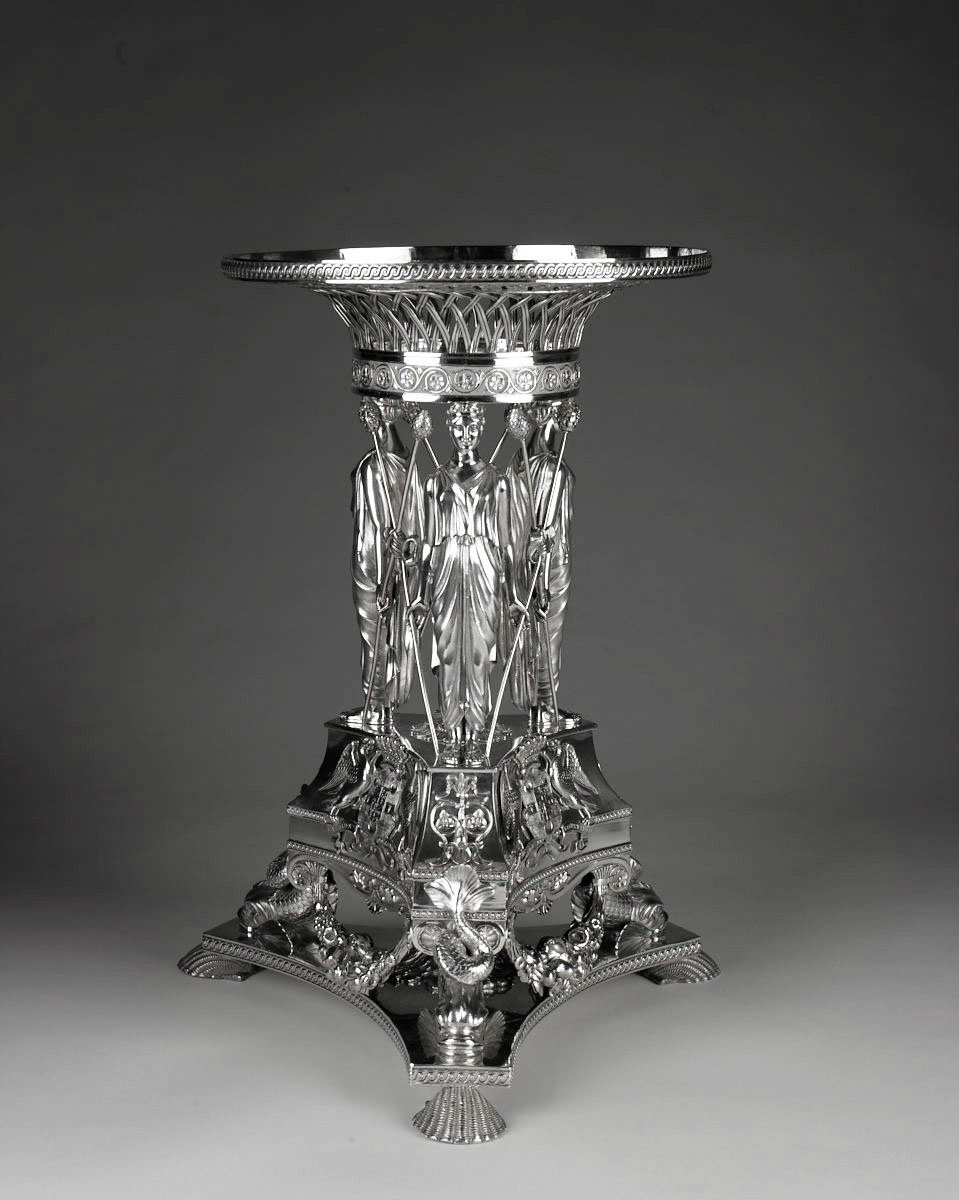
A table centrepiece by Paul Storr, 1810–11, Birmingham Museum of Art

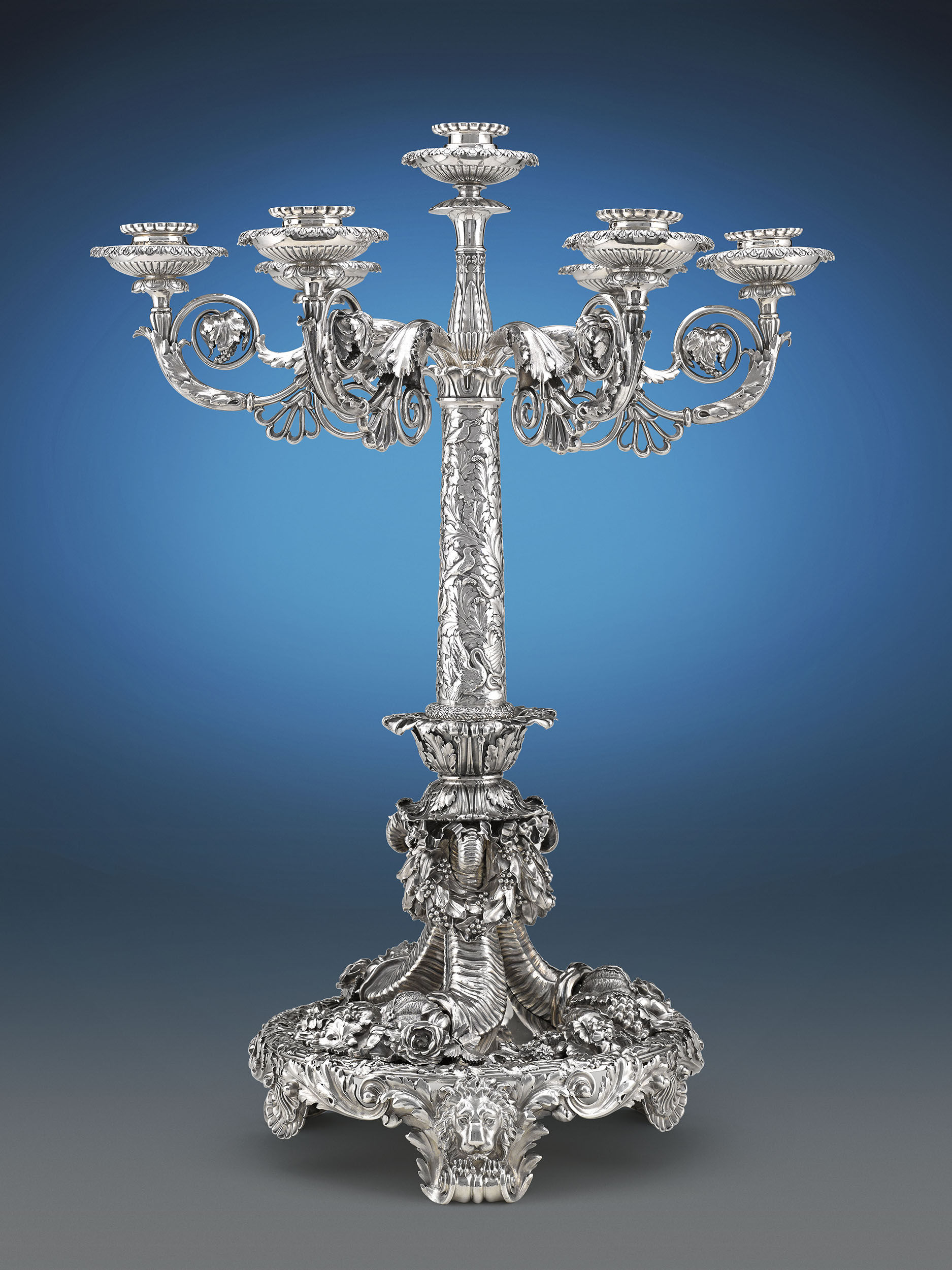
A silver centrepiece. Maker's mark of Paul Storr, London, 1815

An example of his work is the cup made for presentation to the British admiral Lord Nelson to mark his victory at the Battle of the Nile.

Items from Storr's workshops may be seen at Windsor Castle and during the summer opening season at Buckingham Palace. There are significant holdings of items in the National Silver Collection at the Victoria and Albert Museum as well as in the Wellington Collection at Apsley House. Outside London there are important works at Brighton Pavilion, at the Bowes Museum, Barnard Castle and at Woburn Abbey. In the United States there are holdings of Paul Storr at the Huntington Museum of Art, the Museum of Fine Arts, Boston, the Los Angeles County Museum of Art, and the Metropolitan Museum of Art, New York, among others. The Birmingham Museum of Art in Alabama has two significant pieces, one of which is illustrated here. In Canada, there are significant pieces in the Museum of Fine Arts, Montreal, and the Winnipeg Art Gallery, Winnipeg, Manitoba. Australia has holdings at the National Gallery of Victoria in Melbourne. In Portugal there is a fascinating group of silver made by Storr at the Casa-Museu Medeiros e Almeida, Lisbon, whereas in Russia, at the State Hermitage Museum, there is silver supplied to Tsar Nicholas I and members of the aristocracy by Hunt & Roskell, successors to Storr & Mortimer.

Storr's workshop made many pieces modelled on the Warwick Vase; the Royal Collection has two ice pails acquired by King William IV and the National Museum of Scotland has a silver-gilt vase on display

== Exhibitions of his work ==
- Mr. and Mrs. Morrie A. Moss collection of Paul Storr silver, 1771–1843, Brooks Memorial Art Gallery, Memphis, 6–27 March 1966
- Paul Storr in America, Indianapolis Museum of Art, 8 February – 12 March 1972; Dayton Art Institute, 24 March – 30 April 1972
- Master Silver by Paul Storr and His Contemporaries and Followers: Selections from the Elinor Bright Richardson Collection, New Orleans Museum of Art, 8 December 1990 – 24 February 1991
- Art in Industry: The Silver of Paul Storr, Koopman Rare Art, London, 13–31 October 2015

== Bibliography ==
- Clark, Mark A., with an introduction by Judith Banister, Paul Storr in American Collections. Indianapolis, IN: Indianapolis Museum of Art, 1972 OCLC 695930
- Hartop, Christopher, with a foreword by Kathryn Jones, Art in Industry: The Silver of Paul Storr, John Adamson, Cambridge, October 2015 ISBN 978-1-898565-14-7 OCLC 927983072; 168 pp.
- Hartop, Christopher et al., with a foreword by HRH The Prince of Wales, Royal Goldsmiths: The Art of Rundell & Bridge 1797–1843, John Adamson, Cambridge, 2005 ISBN 978-0-9524322-3-4 OCLC 61424651; 168 pp.
- Moss, Morris A., Mr. and Mrs. Morrie A. Moss collection of Paul Storr silver, 1771–1843, Memphis, TN: Brooks Memorial Art Gallery, 1966 OCLC 4348087
- Moss, Morrie A., The Lillian and Morrie Moss Collection of Paul Storr Silver, Miami, FL: Roskin Book Productions, 1972 OCLC 646107342
- New Orleans Museum of Art (John W. Keefe), Master Silver by Paul Storr, His Contemporaries and Followers: Selections from the Collection of Elinor Bright Richardson, New Orleans, LA: New Orleans Museum of Art, 1990 OCLC 23816370
- Penzer, Norman M., with a foreword by Charles Oman, Paul Storr: The Last of the Goldsmiths, London: Batsford, 1954
- Penzer, Norman M., Paul Storr 1771–1844: Silversmith and Goldsmith, London, 1971, reissue of 1954 book by Spring Books/Littlehampton Book Services, New York ISBN 978-0600-37960-7 OCLC 714904; 292 pp.

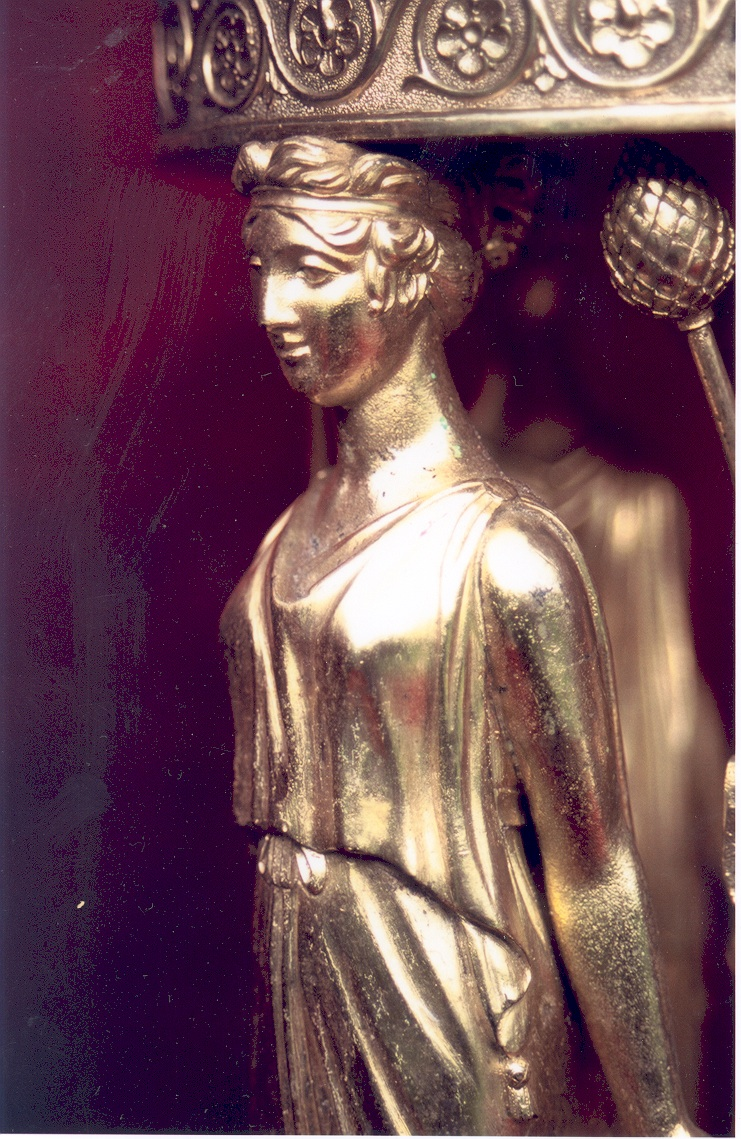
Detail of a silver-gilt caryatid on a dessert-stand, Paul Storr, London, 1812
