= A. M. Champneys =

British novelist and poet (1888–1966)

Adelaide Mary Champneys (8 March 1888 – 15 April 1966) was a British novelist and poet of the mid 20th century whose central characters were often women.

== Biography ==
Little is known about the life of Adelaide Mary Champneys, who published all but one of her books anonymously. Born in Hampstead in 1888, she was one of five children of May Theresa Ella (Drummond) and Basil Champneys.

A. M. Champneys wrote a dozen novels between the 1910s and the 1940s and two volumes of poetry. Her critically well-received 1925 novel Miss Tiverton Goes Out has been called "a charming and poignant idyll" and "a kind of masterpiece of oddness," reminiscent of such divergent writers as John Galsworthy, Henry James, Virginia Woolf, and Rachel Ferguson. It centers on a rather solitary girl named Juliet, her dysfunctional family, and the old woman who lives next door, who becomes a focal point for the family's prejudices, fantasies, and anxieties even though she remains entirely absent throughout the book. Bride Elect (1913) and The Recoiling Force (1915) were also well reviewed.

Her 1929 Memorial to George, By Himself is about a squirrel, written in the animal's voice with Champneys as the 'editor'.

One of her last books, Fool's Melody (1937) was coauthored with her brother Michael Weldon Champneys.

Champneys' last book, Red Sun and Harvest Moon (1947), was the first to be published under her own name and apparently led to an immediate revelation of the authorship of at least one of her earlier works.

She died in Paddington in 1966, aged 78.

== Publications ==
- Verses 1902
- Love's Empire, and Other Poems (1909)
- Bride Elect (1913)
- The Recoiling Force (1914)
- The House Made with Hands (1924)
- Miss Tiverton Goes Out (1925)
- This Day's Madness (1926)
- November Night (1928)
- Memorial to George, By Himself (1929)
- The Longer Day (aka: The Longer Days) (1930)
- I Can Wait (1933)
- Fool's Melody (1937; with Michael Weldon Champneys)
- Red Sun and Harvest Moon (1947)
