= Dalrymple-Champneys baronets =

Extinct baronetcy in the Baronetage of the United Kingdom

Escutcheon of the Dalrymple-Champneys baronets of Littlemeads

The Champneys, later Dalrymple-Champneys Baronetcy, of Littlemeads in the County of Sussex, was a title in the Baronetage of the United Kingdom. It was created on 13 July 1910 for the distinguished physician Francis Champneys. The 2nd Baronet assumed the additional surname of Dalrymple. The title became extinct on his death in 1980.

The 1st Baronet was the son of William Champneys, Dean of Lichfield from 1868 until 1875; and the younger brother of Weldon Champneys and Basil Champneys.

== Champneys, later Dalrymple-Champneys baronets, of Littlemeads (1910) ==
- Sir Francis Henry Champneys, 1st Baronet (1848–1930)
- Sir Weldon Dalrymple-Champneys, 2nd Baronet (1892–1980)

== Notes ==
Baronetage of the United Kingdom
Preceded by Briscoe baronets	Champneys baronets of Littlemeads; 13 July 1910	Succeeded by Harmsworth baronets
