= Clive Champney =

British broadcaster (1929–2019)

Clive Champney (1929 – 10 December 2019) was a former continuity announcer for Border Television. He joined the station from the BBC in 1963 and remained an announcer and newsreader for 27 years.

Whilst working at Border, Champney also wrote and produced a children's drama series called Timbertops for Metro Radio in Gateshead.
