= Somerville College Library =

Library in Oxford, England

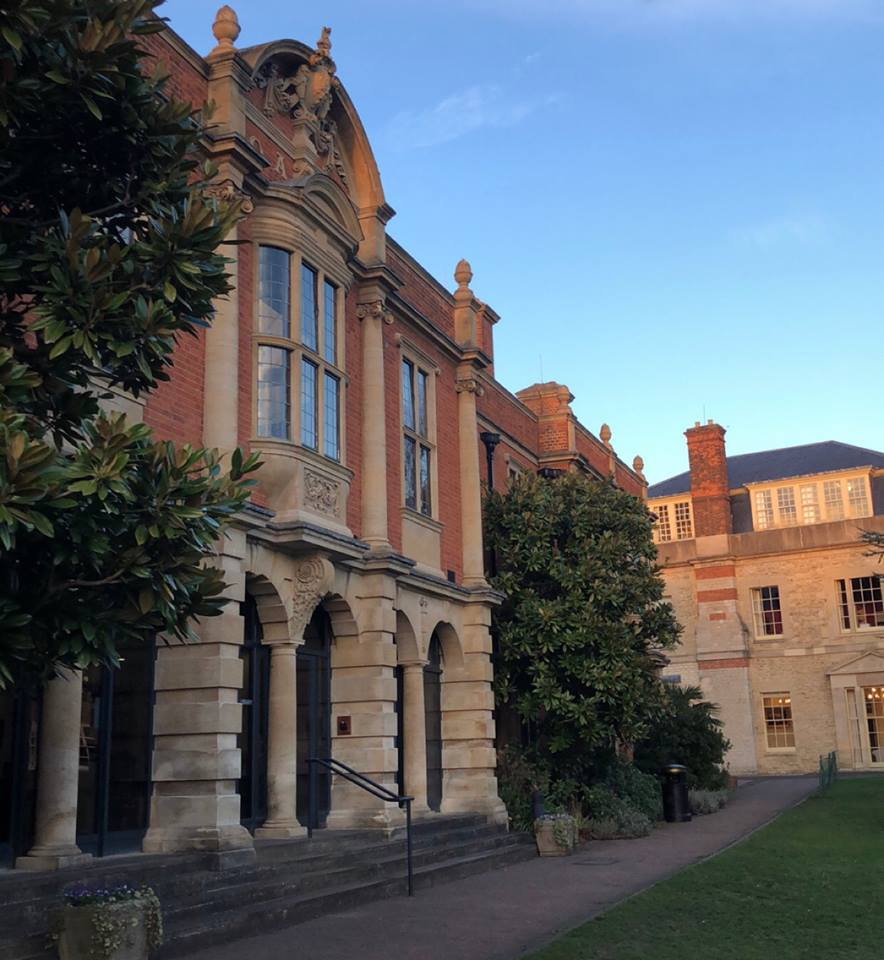
- 51°45′33.8″N 1°15′47.1″W
- Location: Woodstock Road, Oxford, United Kingdom
- Type: Academic library
- Established: 1903

Collection
- Size: 120,000+

Other information
- Website: some.ox.ac.uk/library-it/

Somerville College Library is the college library of Somerville College, one of the 38 colleges of the University of Oxford. The library is one of the largest college libraries at the University of Oxford and has achieved 100% student satisfaction in several annual surveys.

Somerville College Library is situated north of the main quadrangle, facing the Chapel. It is open 24 hours a day, has Wi-Fi, several study rooms and computers, and the main student colour printer and scanner. The library is a Grade II-listed building.

== History ==
The Edwardian building was built in 1903 and designed by Sir Basil Champneys. It was officially opened in 1904 by John Morley. Robert Bridges wrote Demeter specially for this opening, at which it was performed for the first time. Somerville College Library was the first library for women at the University of Oxford, and among the first college libraries built at Oxford with the needs of the undergraduates rather than the fellows in mind.

During the First World War, Somerville college became a hospital for convalescing officers and the library was a popular place for beds to be placed, overlooking the gardens. Siegfried Sassoon and Robert Graves were both to reminisce about their time at Somerville Hospital.

Indira Gandhi had her room in the building, before the ground floor was added to the library in 1974.

== Collection ==
The library has a collection of approximately 2,000 books from the philosopher and women's rights activist John Stuart Mill and his father James Mill, the so-called John Stuart Mill Library, which was donated in 1905. The books contain many notes by Mill himself, which are being catalogued and researched by the University of Alabama and Oxford. Other notable donations or collections are from Amelia Edwards, Robert Bridges, John Ruskin, William Morris, Vernon Lee, Mary Lascelles and alumnae Vera Brittain, Margery Fry, Margaret Kennedy, Vivien Noakes and Muriel St. Clare Byrne. The library also owns letters from Ada Lovelace, notes from Mary Somerville and a letter from Charles Babbage addressed to Somerville. These are stored, however, in the Bodleian Library. The library contains paintings by Mary Somerville, John Constable, Maud Sumner and Patrick George.

The special collections include one of the first editions of Gustave Doré's illustrated Divine Comedy by Dante, published by Hachette Livre, from 1861; a print of the Divine Comedy from 1578 with 15th century commentary; a print of the works of Geoffrey Chaucer from 1570; an English translation of Giambattista della Porta's Magia Naturalis from 1658; a copy of Shakespeare's Second Folio which was part of David Garrick's library; and a copy of the second edition of Isaac Newton's Philosophiæ Naturalis Principia Mathematica from 1713.

To allow for future growth the library was built to contain about 60,000 books, while it possessed only 6,000 at opening. At the time female students had no access to the other libraries at the university. Today, the library holds approximately 120,000 items, 95,000 of which are on open shelves.

== Gallery ==
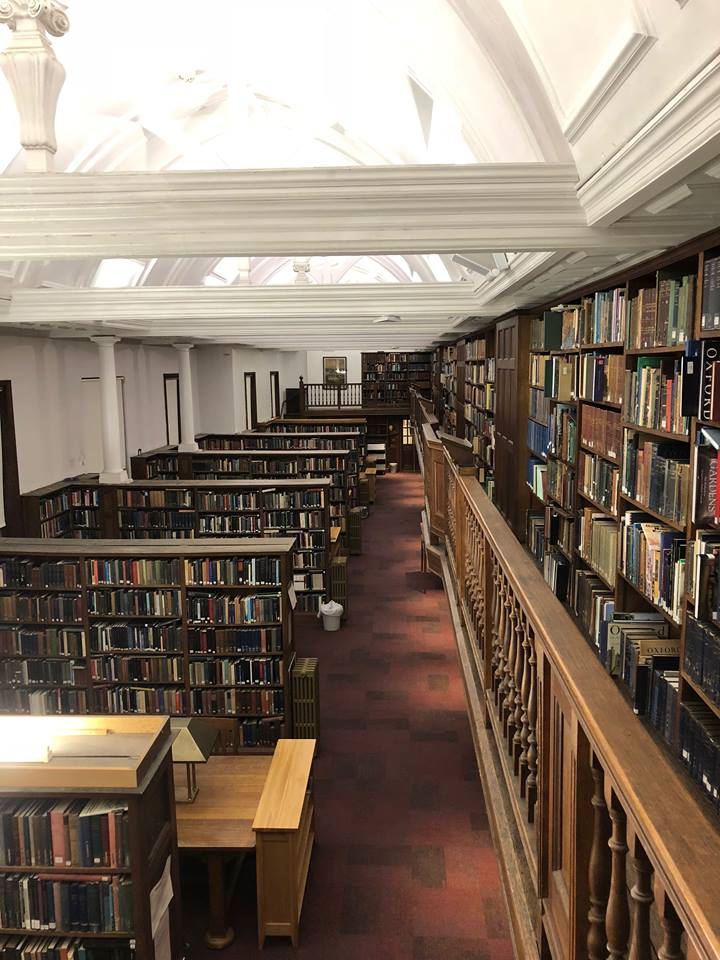
Pfeiffer Room

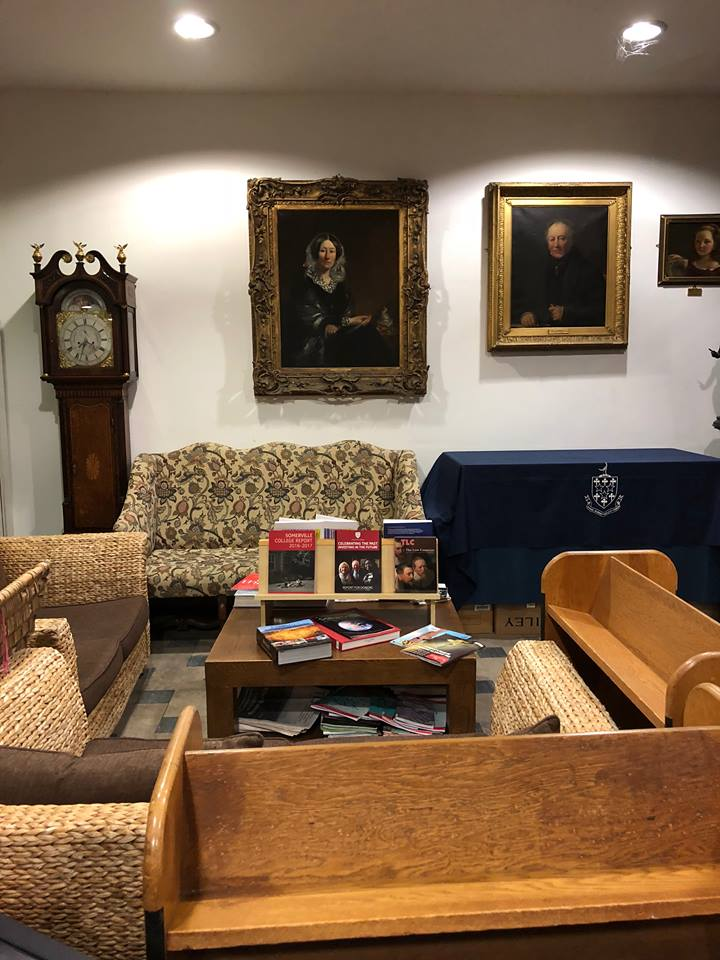
Loggia

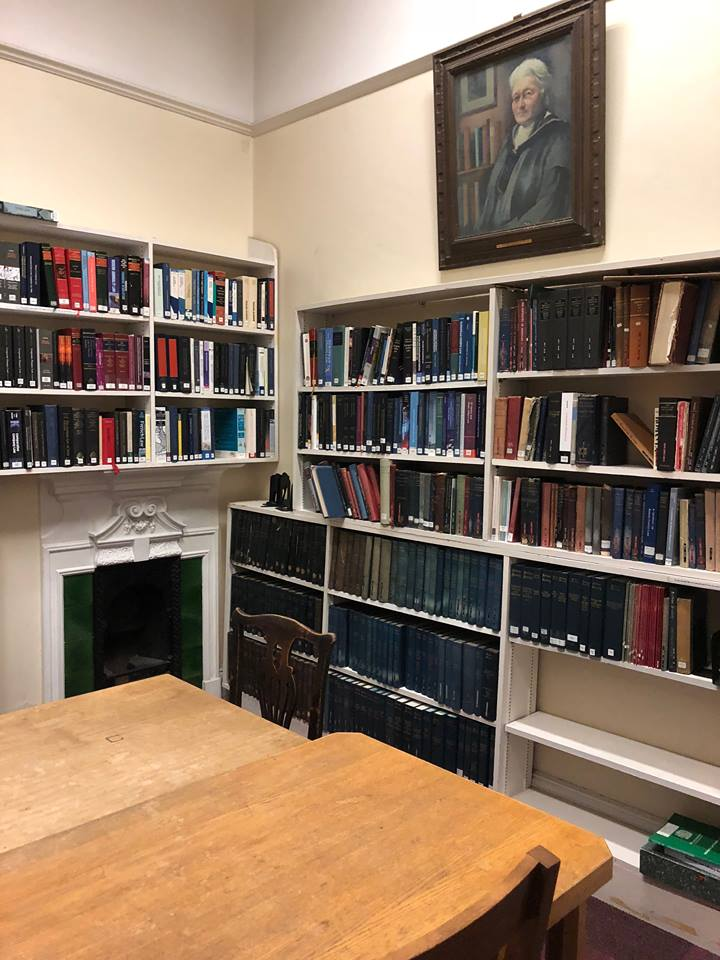
Law Room

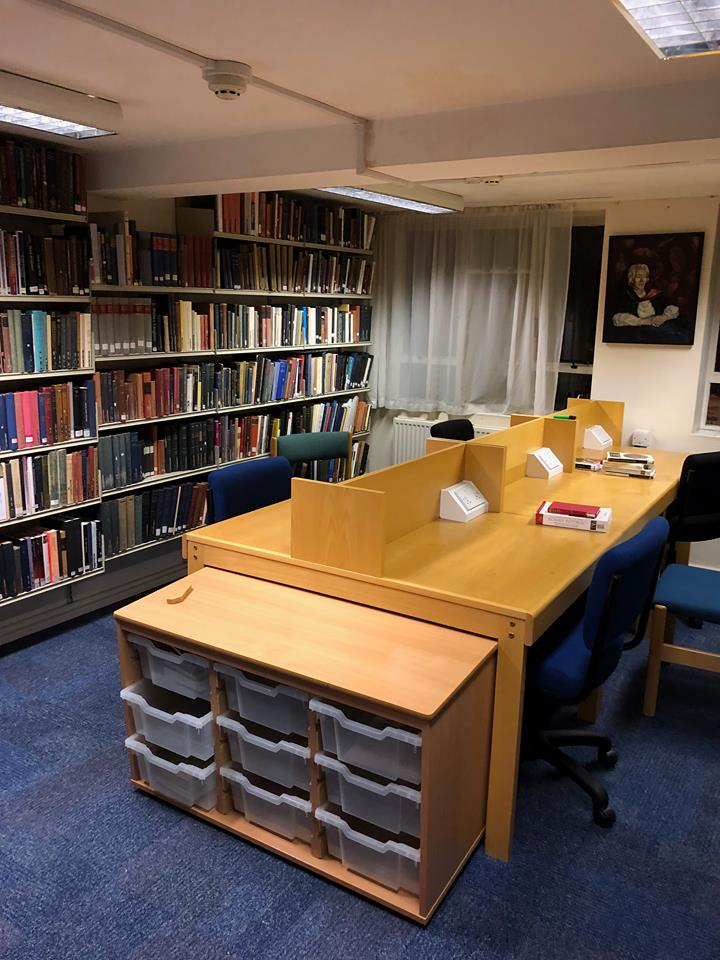
Christina Barratt Classics Room

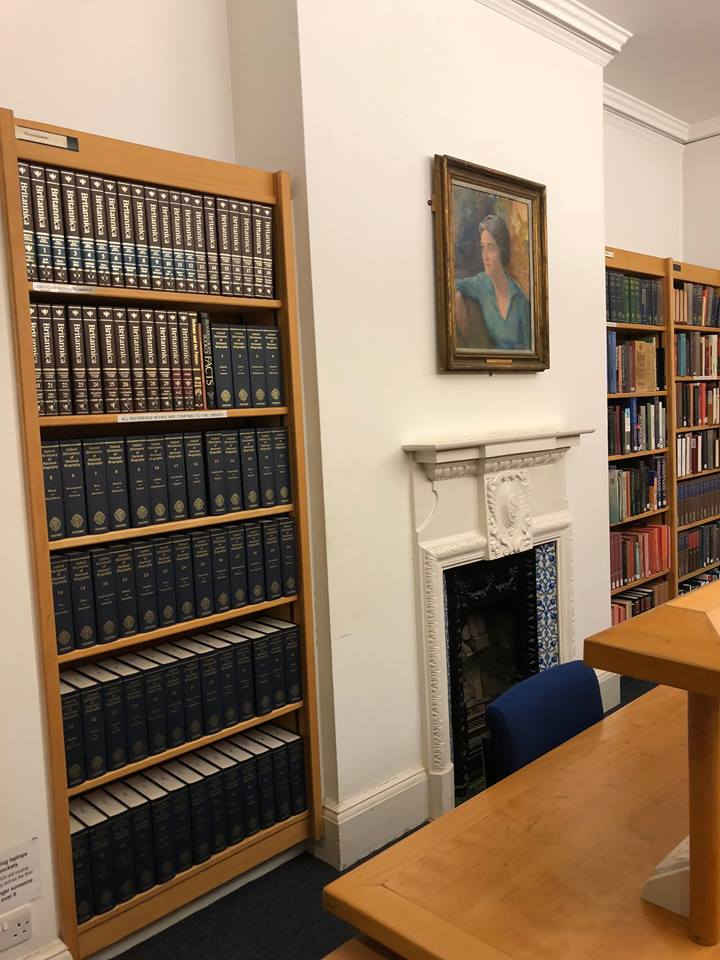
Lower library

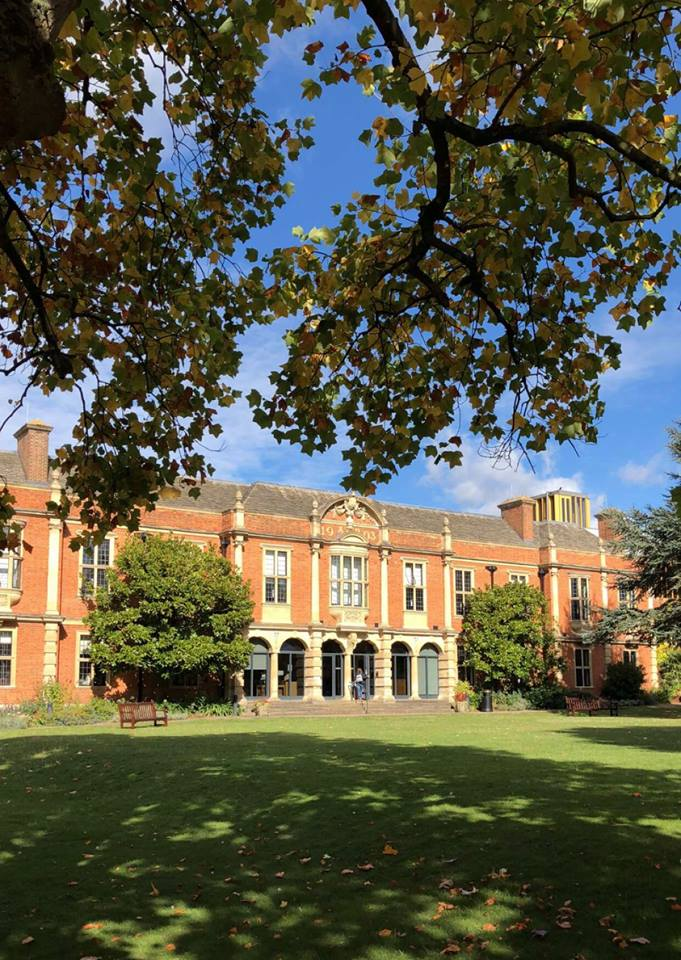
Library from the south east of quad

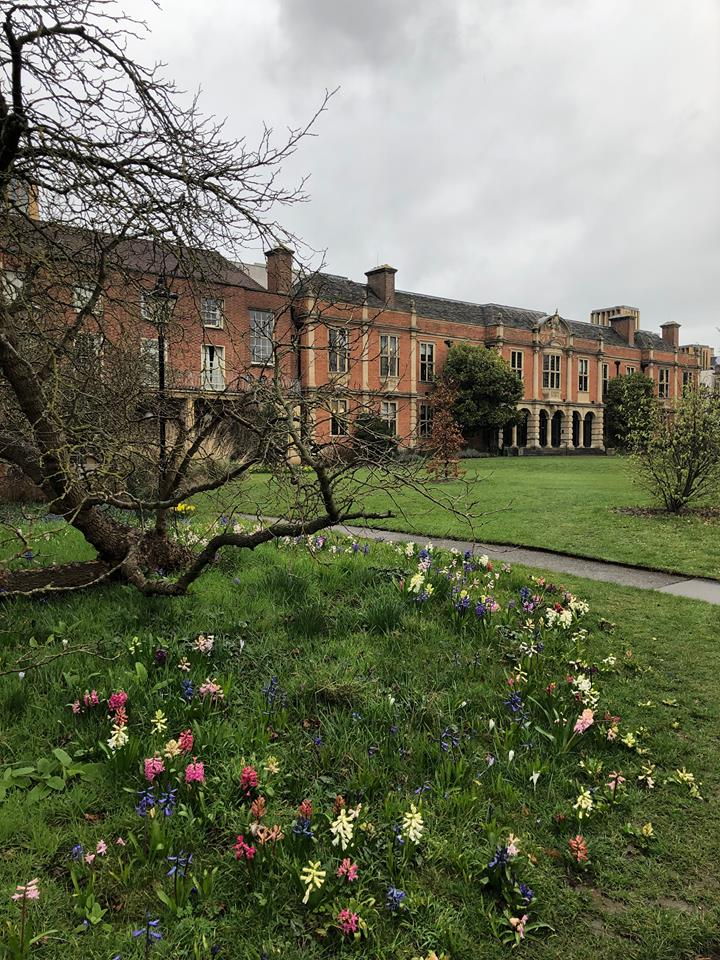
Library from in front of Park
