= William Weldon Champneys =

British Anglican priest and author

Weldon Champneys
- Dean of Lichfield
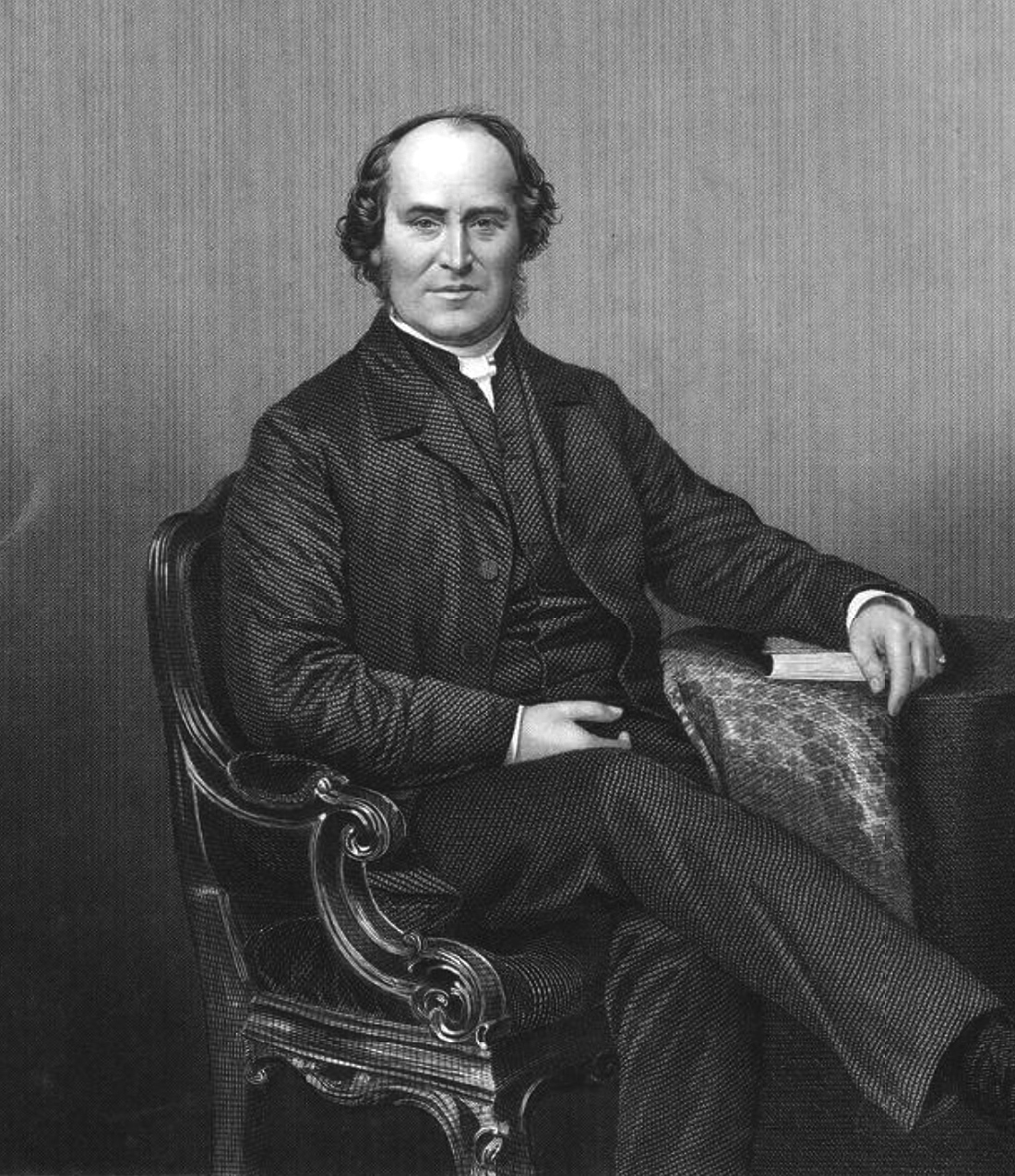
- Rev. Weldon Champneys, mid-19th century
- Church: Church of England
- Diocese: Diocese of Lichfield
- Predecessor: Henry Howard
- Successor: Edward Bickersteth

Orders
- Ordination: 1831

Personal details
- Born: William Weldon Champneys; 6 April 1807 Camden Town, St Pancras, London, England
- Died: 4 February 1875 (aged 67) Lichfield, England
- Denomination: Anglican
- Children: Sir Francis Champneys, 1st Baronet; Basil Champneys; Weldon Champneys
- Occupation: Priest
- Education: Brasenose College, Oxford

William Weldon Champneys (6 April 1807 – 4 February 1875) was an Anglican priest and author in the 19th century. He served as Dean of Lichfield from 1868 until his death.

== Early life and education ==
Champneys was born in Camden Town, St Pancras, London, the eldest son of the Rev. William Betton Champneys, B.C.L. of St John's College, Oxford, and his wife, Martha Stable, daughter of Montague Stable, of Kentish Town. He was educated by the Rev. Richard Povah, rector of St James's, Duke's Place, City of London, and having matriculated from Brasenose College, Oxford, on 3 July 1824, was soon after elected to a scholarship. He took his B.A. degree in 1828, and his M.A. in 1831.

== Career ==
Champneys was ordained to the curacy of Dorchester on the Thames near Oxford, whence he was transferred three months afterwards to the curacy of St Ebbe's Church, Oxford, and in the same year was admitted a fellow of his college. In this parish he established national schools, the first that were founded in the city, and during the severe visitation of the cholera in 1832 he assiduously devoted himself to the sick.

Later he held incumbencies at Whitechapel and St Pancras; and was a Canon of St Paul's Cathedral from 1851. He was in 1837, appointed rector of St Mary's, Whitechapel, a parish containing thirty-three thousand people, where, mainly through his personal exertions in the course of a short time, three new churches were built.

Here also he erected schools for boys and girls, and a special school for infants; but finding that many children could not attend in consequence of being in want of suitable apparel, he set up a school of a lower grade, which was practically the first ragged school opened in the metropolis. In connection with the district he founded a provident society, assisted in the commencement of a shoeblack brigade, with a refuge and an industrial home for the boys, and co-operated with others in the work of building the Whitechapel Foundation Commercial School.

He was the originator of a local association for the promotion, health, and comfort of the industrial classes, and also of the Church of England Young Men's Society, the first association of young men for religious purposes and mutual improvement which was seen in Whitechapel.

The London coal-whippers were indebted to him for the establishment of an office, under an act of parliament in 1843, where alone they could be legally hired, instead of as before being obliged to wait in public-houses. His principles were evangelical and catholic. His sermons attracted working men by plain appeals to their good sense and right feeling. On 3 Nov. 1851, on the recommendation of Lord John Russell, he was appointed to a canonry in St Paul's, and the dean and chapter of that cathedral in 1860 gave him the vicarage of St Pancras, a benefice at one time held by his grandfather.

The rectory of Whitechapel had been held by him during twenty-three years, and on his removal he received many valuable testimonials and universal expressions of regret at his departure. He was named dean of Lichfield on 11 November 1868; attached to the deanery was the rectory of Tatenhill, and his first act was to increase the stipend of the curate of that rectory from £100 to £600 a year, and to expend another 600l. in rebuilding the chancel of the church.

Amongst others, he wrote The Path of a Sunbeam (1845); The Spirit of The World (1862), Parish Work (1865), and Things New and Old (1869).

== Family ==
He married on 20 March 1838, Mary Anne, fourth daughter of the goldsmith and silversmith Paul Storr, of Beckenham, Kent. His seven children included the distinguished physician Francis Champneys, the architect and author Basil Champneys and the rowing clergyman Weldon Champneys.

== Death ==
Champneys died at the deanery in Lichfield in 1875, and was buried in the cathedral yard on 9 February.

== Notes ==
Church of England titles
Preceded by Henry Howard	Dean of Lichfield; 1868–1875	Succeeded by Edward Bickersteth
