= Basil Champneys =

British architect and author (1842–1935)

- Born: 17 September 1842; Whitechapel, London, England
- Died: 5 April 1935 (aged 92); Hampstead, England
- Occupation: Architect
- Buildings: John Rylands Library, Somerville College Library, Mansfield College, Oxford, Newnham College, Cambridge

Basil Champneys (17 September 1842 – 5 April 1935) was an English architect and author whose most notable buildings include Manchester's John Rylands Library, Somerville College Library (Oxford), Newnham College, Cambridge, Lady Margaret Hall, Oxford, Mansfield College, Oxford and Oriel College, Oxford's Rhodes Building.

== Life ==
Champneys was born in Whitechapel, London, on 17 September 1842 into a family with a modest income. His father, William Weldon Champneys, was an Evangelical Vicar of St Mary's Church, Whitechapel (later Dean of Lichfield). His mother, Mary Anne, was fourth daughter of the goldsmith and silversmith Paul Storr (his cousins thus including Rev. Vernon Storr, Archdeacon of Westminster from 1931 to 1936, Rev. Frank Utterton, Archdeacon of Surrey from 1906 to 1908, the artists Rex Whistler and Laurence Whistler, and the academic Michael Lindsay, 2nd Baron Lindsay of Birker). One of eight children, he attended Charterhouse School, showing a talent for mathematics and lacking in drawing skills. In 1860, he entered Trinity College, Cambridge. In 1864, he failed to get the 'first class' degree he had hoped for, achieving a second class in the Classical Tripos, and he took articles to study as an architect with John Prichard, the Surveyor of Llandaff Cathedral. Champneys set up his practice as an architect in 1867 in Queen's Square, London, close to the office of Morris & Co.

In 1876 he married May Theresa Ella, the daughter of Maurice Drummond, descendant of William Drummond, 4th Viscount Strathallan, and they had two sons and two daughters. Champneys was a member of the Century Guild, the Athenaeum Club and the Savile Club, making acquaintances with Walter Pater, Robert Louis Stevenson, Sidney Colvin, and Coventry Patmore. In 1912 the Royal Institute of British Architects awarded Champneys its Royal Gold Medal for architecture. Champneys died at his home, 42 Frognal Lane, Hampstead, on 5 April 1935. He was the brother of Brasenose rowers Weldon Champneys (clergyman) and Sir Francis Champneys (doctor).

== Writings ==
His writings include an introduction to Henry Merritt: Art Criticism and Romance, published in 1879 and Churches about Queen Victoria Street, a portfolio published in 1871, Victorian art and originality for the British Architect published in 1887, and The architecture of Queen Victoria's reign for the Art Journal, published in 1887. A Quiet Corner of England: Studies of Landscape and Architecture in Winchelsea, Rye and Romney Marsh was published in 1875 after being circulated as a portfolio and a work regarding his mother-in-law, Adelaide Drummond, A Retrospect and Memoir, was published in 1915. Champneys' correspondence has been preserved in the General Collection of the Beinecke Rare Book and Manuscript Library.

== Architecture ==
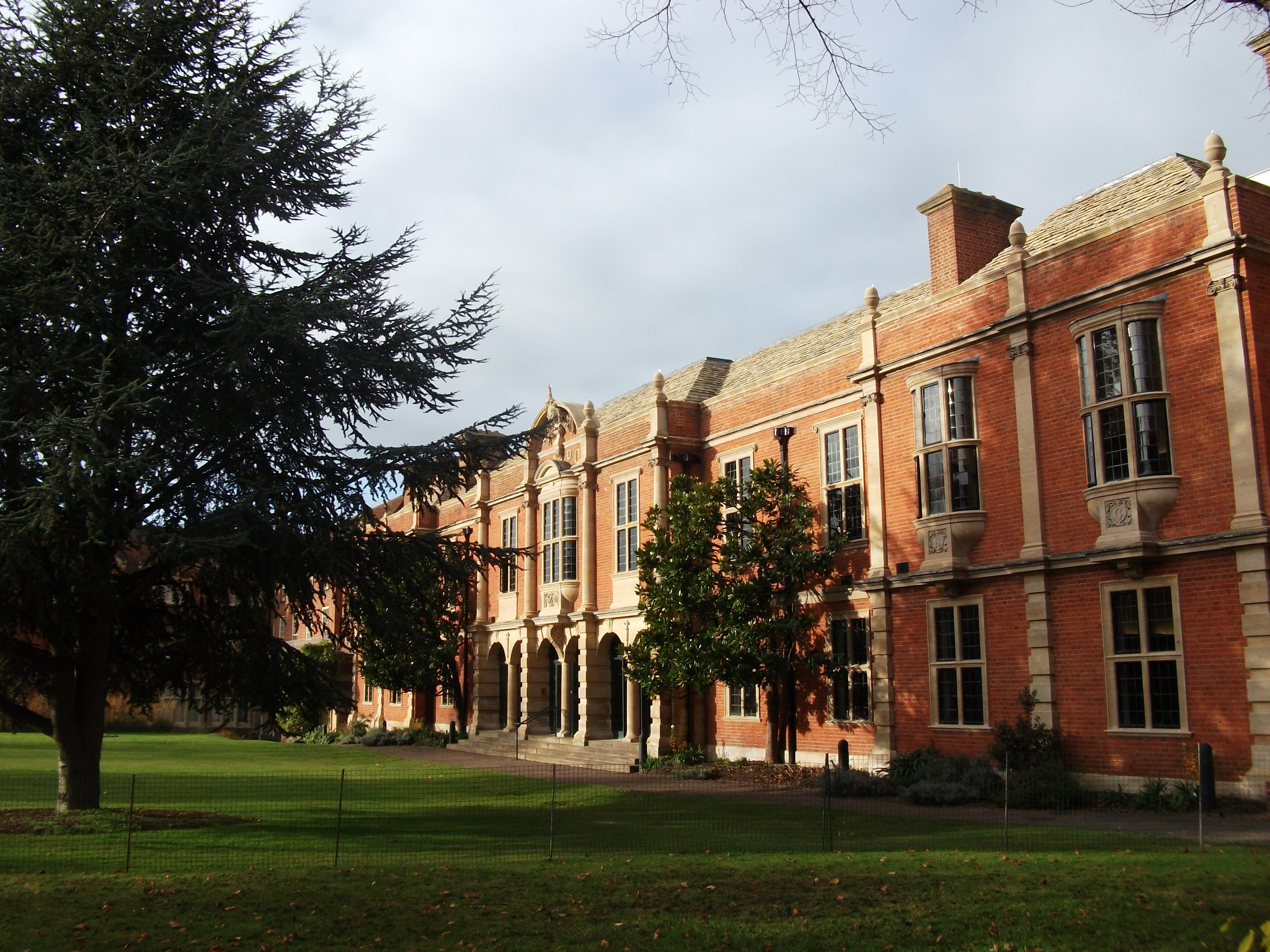
Somerville College Library, Oxford

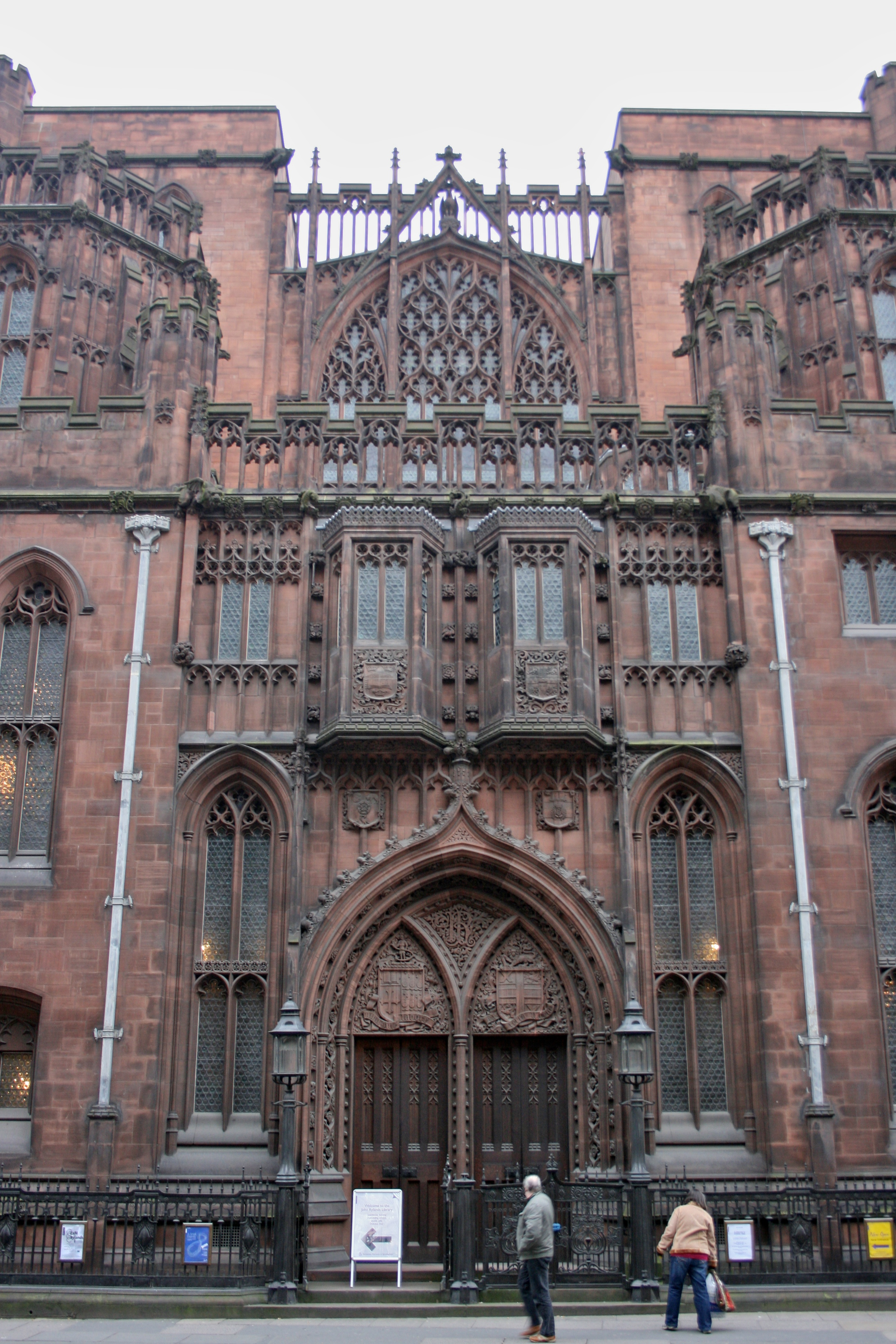
John Rylands Library (1900) in Manchester – Grade-I listed and considered Champneys' magnum opus.

Believing that architecture was 'an art not a science' he joined the Art Workers Guild instead of the Royal Institute of British Architects. Although Champneys was able to work in the Gothic style that John Prichard preferred and taught, he later became one of the pioneers of the Queen Anne style, working on at least 100 buildings throughout England. John Rylands' widow, Enriqueta Rylands, had admired the library Champneys had designed for Mansfield College, Oxford and hired him to develop the design on a more lavish scale – The John Rylands Memorial Library in Deansgate, Manchester took nine years to build before opening on 1 January 1900, it is one of Champneys' finest designs.

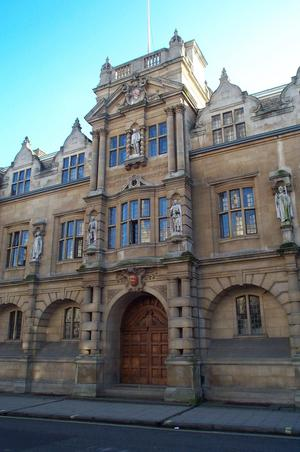
The Rhodes Building, Oriel College, Oxford

Champneys' Oxford buildings include the Church of St Peter-le-Bailey (1872–1874), which serves as the chapel for St Peter's College, New Old Hall in Lady Margaret Hall (1881–1883), the Indian Institute (1883–1896), the Mansfield College library (1886–1889), the Robinson Tower at New College (1896), the Somerville College Library (1903), St Alban Quad at Merton College (1905–1910), a chapel and residence hall at Linacre College (1907–1909), and the Rhodes Building in Oriel College (1908–1911).

His Cambridge works include the Archaeological Museum (1883), now Peterhouse Theatre, the Divinity and Literary School and Newnham College (between 1875 and 1910), for which he is credited for bringing a 'touch of lightness' to the college and is acknowledged for his attention to both construction details, and to cost.

Champneys' buildings elsewhere include the chapel of Mill Hill School, London (1898), buildings for Bedford College in Regent's Park (1910), King Edward VII School (King's Lynn) (1910–1913), the Butler Museum at Harrow School (1886), the museum at Winchester College (1898), and Bedford High School (1878–1892). Champneys also designed the Wilnecote Board School buildings as a slightly earlier work in 1877. Churches by Champneys include his father's parish church, St Luke's, Kentish Town (1867–1870), the sailors' church of St Mary Star of the Sea, Hastings (1878), and St Chad, Slindon, Staffordshire (1894). In 1897 he did the painting of clouds, cherubs and scrolls on the ceiling of St George the Martyr, Southwark in London. In 1898 he added a porch to St Mary, Manchester, where he was surveyor, and between 1902 and 1903, a south annexe. His home, Hall Oak, in Frognal, Hampstead was also one of his works.

== See also ==
- Shelley Memorial, University College, Oxford
