= Johnny Briscoe =

American wrongly convicted of rape

- Occupation: Handyman
- Known for: Rape conviction and exoneration
- Children: 2

Johnny Briscoe is an American man falsely convicted of rape and other crimes and subsequently exonerated by DNA evidence.

== Crime ==
On October 21, 1982, in the early morning, Larry Smith, an acquaintance of Briscoe, broke into a woman's apartment in suburban St. Louis, Missouri, robbed the woman of her jewelry at knifepoint, and then raped her. Smith remained with the woman, in a lit room, for an hour after the rape, while he smoked a cigarette and she smoked two. He told her that his name was Johnny Briscoe. After the rapist left the scene the victim called police. While police were still on the scene, Smith called the victim's apartment repeatedly, again identifying himself as Johnny Briscoe. These calls were traced back to a payphone near Briscoe's apartment. The woman identified Briscoe in both a photo and in a live police lineup in which Briscoe was the only person in an orange jumpsuit.

== Conviction ==
A forensic chemist from the St. Louis County Crime Laboratory testified that semen was present on swabs from the victim’s rape kit as well as on pantyhose, a towel and the victim’s bed sheets. A forensic hair expert testified that a head hair found on the victim’s bed sheet showed characteristics similar to Briscoe’s head hair. Because there is not adequate empirical data on the frequency of various class characteristics in human hair, an analyst’s assertion that hairs are consistent or similar is inherently prejudicial and lacks probative value.

Briscoe's attorney used an alibi defence, stating that Briscoe was at his apartment, watching Game 7 of the 1982 World Series (in which the St. Louis Cardinals defeated the Milwaukee Brewers). In the court room, Briscoe responded to a question and said that the Brewers won the World Series, making the alibi incredible. The jury took less than 2 hours to convict Briscoe of all the charges: rape, sodomy, burglary, robbery, stealing and armed criminal action. He was sentenced to 45 years in prison.

== Imprisonment and exoneration ==
Briscoe spent five months in a cell adjacent to Larry Smith whom he confronted and accused of framing him. Smith denied the allegation. Briscoe's wife divorced him 10 years into the sentence.

Briscoe requested that evidence from the crime scene be tested for DNA but the St. Louis District Attorney refused. In 1997 Briscoe's motion to compel the District Attorney to search for DNA evidence was rejected.

In 2000, Centurion Ministries took the case, and, that year and again in 2001, requested that the St. Louis Crime Laboratory search for DNA evidence. The Lab responded that the evidence collected could not be found and was probably destroyed.

In 2004, however, the cigarettes from the crime scene were found in an inventory, but the district attorney was not informed until July 6, 2006. Testing proved that Larry Smith was the criminal, not Briscoe. Briscoe, then 52, walked out of a Charleston, Mo. prison on July 19, 2006, just days after being told that the evidence had been found and tested, he has served 23 years behind bars.

== Post-release ==
Briscoe's exoneration was widely covered in national news. It is taking some time for him to convince his family of his innocence, and for him to get a full-time job. He is suing St. Louis County and four police officers to compensate him for his time spent in prison.

Smith was convicted of the crime and is incarcerated in the Southeast Correctional Center.

== Personal life ==
Briscoe forced his wife to divorce him after his arrest. Briscoe had a daughter who was 7 and a son who was 2 when he was convicted.

== See also ==
- List of wrongful convictions in the United States
