= John Champneys (religious radical) =

John Champneys was a 16th-century English religious radical. He is known for authoring The Harvest is at hand (1548), a Calvinist anti-clerical tract which targeted Roman Catholic and Evangelical preaching.

Champneys was from Somerset. On 27 April 1549, he was brought before Archbishop Thomas Cranmer at St Paul's Cathedral to repent various heresies, including the idea that once a person is spiritually reborn in Christ, they cannot sin, denying that those reborn in Christ could lose their godly love or break Christ's commandments, and of promoting the belief that people do not possess a spirit enabling them to remain righteous in Christ. Additionally, he was accused of advocating that God's chosen people could enjoy worldly possessions fully. He was subsequently convicted of heresy and did not appear to continue publishing after his conviction. The contemporaneous biographer John Strype described Champneys and Henry Hart, also accused of heretical teachings, as "the first that made separation from the reformed Church of England".

Champneys died in or after 1559.
