= Sir John Briscoe, 1st Baronet =

Sir John James Briscoe, 1st Baronet, JP, DL (6 December 1836 – 1 May 1919) was a British baronet.

Briscoe was the eldest son of John Briscoe and his wife Elizabeth, daughter of Leigh Burrowes. He was appointed as a deputy lieutenant and justice of the peace for the county.

Briscoe was a member of the Liberal Party, and unsuccessfully contested the seat of King's Lynn at the 1886 general election.

Briscoe was appointed High Sheriff of Cambridgeshire and Huntingdonshire for the year 1888.

When Cambridgeshire County Council was created in 1889, Briscoe was elected to the council as an alderman at their first meeting.

He was created a baronet, of Bourn Hall, in the Parish of Bourn, in the County of Cambridge on 12 July 1910.

Briscoe married Ellen Charlton, only daughter of Alfred Charlton on 11 June 1863 and had by her seven children, three daughters and four sons. His wife died in 1910 and Briscoe survived her until 1919. He was succeeded in the baronetcy successively by his first son Alfred and then his second son John.

Baronetage of the United Kingdom
New creation	Baronet (of Bourn); 1910–1919	Succeeded by Alfred Leigh Briscoe
