= Jill Furse =

English actress (1915–1944)

- Born: Barbara Dolignon Furse; 3 April 1915; Salisbury, Wiltshire, England
- Died: 27 November 1944 (aged 29)
- Spouse: Laurence Whistler (m. 1939)
- Children: 2
- Relatives: Henry Newbolt (grandfather)

Barbara Dolignon "Jill" Furse (3 April 1915 – 27 November 1944) was an English actress.

== Early life ==
Barbara Dolignon Furse was born on 3 April 1915 to Celia (née Newbolt) and Sir Ralph Furse at Netherhampton House in Salisbury. Her grandfather was the poet Sir Henry Newbolt.

== Career ==
Furse made her stage debut as Francine in National 6 at Gate Studio Theatre. She would later reprise of the play on radio in 1937.

In 1938, Furse played Carol in Goodness, How Sad at the Vaudeville Theatre. Furse also starred in The Intruder, a play translated from Asmodée by François Mauriac, produced by Norman Marshall at Wyndham's Theatre. In 1939, she starred in the films Goodbye, Mr. Chips and There Ain't No Justice.

Due to frequent bouts of illness, Furse lost out on some roles, such as playing the Shakespearean heroines at The Old Vic produced by John Gielgud.

In 1942, after a break from acting for a couple of years, Furse returned to the stage in Rebecca at the Strand Theatre in the lead role. Furse had been cast in The Last Rose of Summer produced by Gielgud, but dropped out after discovering she was pregnant for the second time.

== Personal life and death ==
In 1937, writer and family friend Edith Olivier introduced Furse to engraver Laurence Whistler. Whistler and Furse married in September 1939 at Salisbury Cathedral. After their honeymoon, the couple settled on the Furse family estate in Halsdon. When Whistler was serving in the army, the couple only reunited for a few days at a time during his leave. Furse gave birth to her second child, Caroline, in November 1944. Twelve days after the birth, Furse died on 27 November 1944 from a blood infection, at the age of 29. In 1950, Whistler married Furse's younger sister, Theresa.

== Legacy ==
After the end of the Second World War, Whistler published a limited run of Furses's poems. In 1964, he released The Initials in the Heart, an account of his marriage to Furse. This was followed in 1967 with To Celebrate Her Living, a collection of 70 poems dedicated to Furse's memory.
