= Weldon Dalrymple-Champneys =

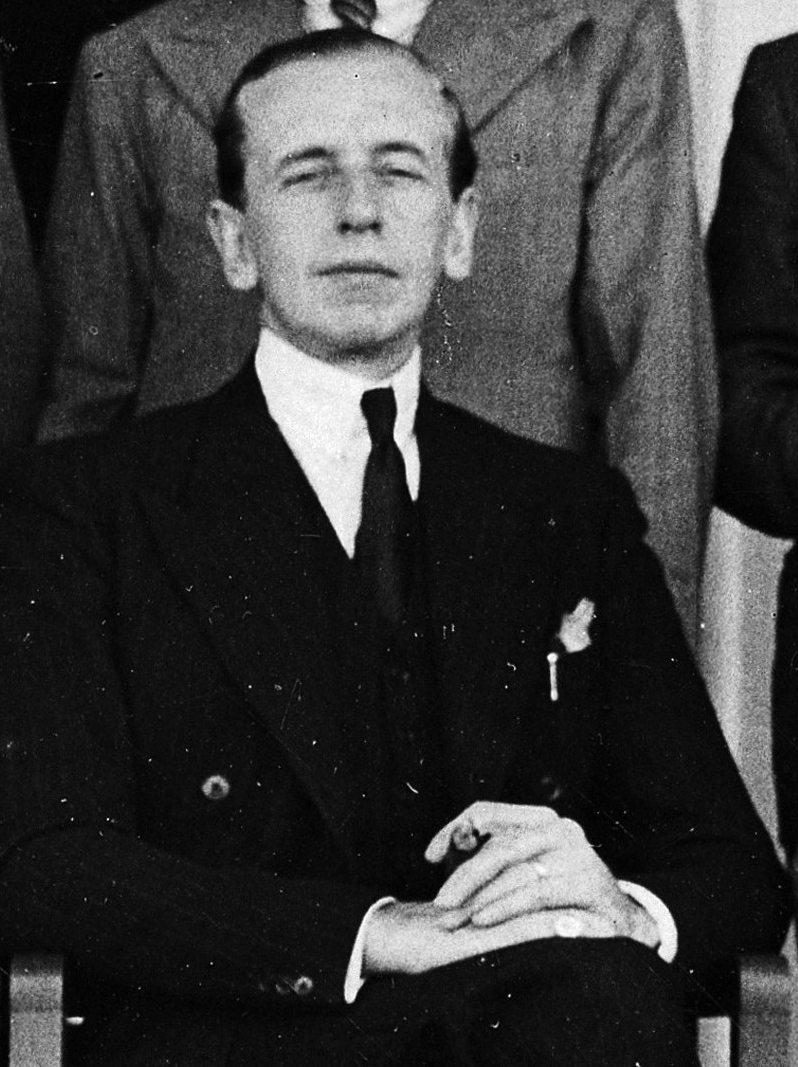
Weldon Dalrymple-Champneys as one of a British medical advisory mission in Lahore, India, 1944 (Wellcome Collection)

Sir Weldon Dalrymple-Champneys, 2nd Baronet CB FRCP (7 May 1892 – 14 December 1980) was a British physician who was a leading figure in the public health service.

== Career ==
Weldon Champneys was the only surviving son of Sir Francis Champneys, 1st Baronet (also a physician) and his wife Virginia, daughter of Sir John Dalrymple, 7th Baronet. He was educated at Gresham's School and studied medicine at Oriel College, Oxford, and St Bartholomew's Hospital, London. His studies were interrupted by the First World War when he served in the Grenadier Guards and reached the rank of captain. He finally obtained his first medical degrees (MB BCh) in 1922 and went on to gain a doctorate (MD) from Oxford in 1929. In 1924 he changed his name by deed poll, adding his mother's surname to his father's and becoming Weldon Dalrymple Champneys. He joined the Ministry of Health and rose to be Deputy Chief Medical Officer 1940–56. He was appointed CB in the 1957 New Year Honours. He was awarded an honorary fellowship of his alma mater, Oriel College, Oxford, in 1967.

His reputation, both as epidemiologist and administrator was very high, and his official reports to the Ministry of Health, especially those dealing with the medical aspects of milk supply, are of the greatest importance.

— Obituary, The Times

== Family ==
In 1924 Weldon Dalrymple-Champneys married Anne Spencer Pratt. He inherited the baronetcy on his father's death in 1930, becoming Sir Weldon Dalrymple-Champneys, 2nd Baronet. Anthony Blunt later claimed that Lady Dalrymple-Champneys was a low-level MI5 agent. She died in 1968 and in 1974 he married Norma Russell (née Lewis) who had been librarian of Somerville College, Oxford, 1952–69; she died in 1997. There were no children of either marriage, so the baronetcy became extinct on Sir Weldon's death.

== Sources ==
- DALRYMPLE-CHAMPNEYS, Captain Sir Weldon, Who Was Who, A & C Black, 1920–2016 (online edition, Oxford University Press, 2014)
- Obituary: Sir Weldon Dalrymple-Champneys: Leading figure in the public health service, The Times, London, 16 December 1980, page 15.

Baronetage of the United Kingdom
Preceded by Francis Champneys	Baronet (of Littlemeads in the County of Sussex); 1930–1980	Extinct
