= Champney =

Champney is a surname. Notable people with the surname include:

- Anthony Champney (born 1569), English Roman Catholic priest and controversialist
- Benjamin Champney (1817–1907), American painter whose name has become synonymous with White Mountain art of the 19th century
- Clive Champney, British former continuity announcer for Border Television
- Elizabeth Williams Champney (1850–1922), American author of numerous articles and novels, most of which focused on foreign locations
- James Wells Champney (1843–1903), American genre and portrait painter

== See also ==
- Champneys (disambiguation)
- Champney's West, Canada
