= Briscoe baronets =

Baronetcy in the Baronetage of the United Kingdom

- Escutcheon of the Briscoe baronets of Bourn Hall
- Creation date: 1910
- Status: extant
- Motto: Præsto et persisto, I perform and persevere

The Briscoe Baronetcy, of Bourn Hall, in the Parish of Bourn, in the County of Cambridge, is a title in the Baronetage of the United Kingdom. It was created on 12 July 1910 for John James Briscoe. He was a County Alderman, a Justice of the Peace and Deputy Lieutenant for Cambridgeshire. His eldest son, the second Baronet, died childless and was succeeded by his younger brother, the third Baronet. As of 2023 the title is held by the latter's great-grandson, the sixth Baronet, who succeeded from birth in 1994, his father having died earlier that year.

== Briscoe baronets, of Bourn Hall (1910) ==
- Sir John James Briscoe, 1st Baronet (1836–1919)
- Sir Alfred Leigh Briscoe, 2nd Baronet (1870–1921)
- Sir John Charlton Briscoe, 3rd Baronet (1874–1960): a Lumleian Lecturer and influential physician
- Sir John Leigh Charlton Briscoe, 4th Baronet (1911–1993)
- Sir (John) James Briscoe, 5th Baronet (1951–1994)
- Sir John Geoffrey James Briscoe, 6th Baronet (born 1994)

The heir presumptive is Edward Home Briscoe (born 1955), uncle of the present holder. His heir apparent is his only son Guy Home Sebastian Briscoe (born 1983).

== See also ==
- Brisco baronets

== Notes ==
Baronetage of the United Kingdom
Preceded by Walton baronets	Briscoe baronets of Bourn Hall; 12 July 1910	Succeeded by Champneys baronets
