= Laurence Whistler =

English poet

Sir Laurence Whistler
- Laurence Whistler photographed by Howard Coster in the 1950s
- Born: Alan Charles Laurence Whistler; 21 January 1912
- Died: 19 December 2000 (aged 88)
- Spouses: Jill Furse (m. 1939; died 1944); Theresa Furse (m. 1950; dissolved 1985); Carol Dawson (m. 1987; div. 1991)
- Children: 4
- Relatives: Rex Whistler (brother)

Sir Alan Charles Laurence Whistler CBE (21 January 1912 – 19 December 2000) was a British glass engraver and poet. He was both the first President of the British Guild of Glass Engravers and the first recipient of the King's Gold Medal for Poetry.

== Early life ==
Whistler was born at Eltham, a son of builder and estate agent Henry Whistler and Helen Frances Mary, daughter of Rev. Charles Slegg Ward, vicar of Wootton St Lawrence in Hampshire, whose wife, Jessy, was granddaughter of the goldsmith and silversmith Paul Storr. He was educated at Stowe School and Balliol College, Oxford.

== Career ==
In 1935, Whistler became the first recipient of the King's Gold Medal for Poetry. Verse works of his included The Emperor Heart; Four Walls; Armed October and other Poems; and In Time of Suspense, in 1940, published by William Heinemann. He also wrote a biography, Sir John Vanbrugh, Architect and Dramatist. He began engraving to supplement his income, and later largely turned away from verse.

Whistler engraved on goblets and bowls blown to his own designs, and (increasingly, as he became more celebrated) on large-scale panels and windows for churches and private houses. He also engraved on three-sided prisms, some of them designed to revolve on a small turntable so that the prism's internal reflections completed the image. The best-known of these was done as a memorial to his elder brother, Rex Whistler.

His early works include a casket for the Queen Mother, and a hinged glass triptych to hold her daily schedule. Other engravings of his can be found, for example, in Salisbury, where his family lived during part of his childhood, including a pair of memorial panels with quotations by T. S. Eliot, and the Rex Prism in the Morning Chapel, both in Salisbury Cathedral; at the Ashmolean Museum; at Balliol College, Oxford where he was an undergraduate, and St Hugh's College, Oxford, where he also designed the Swan Gates leading from the college grounds onto Canterbury Road; at Stowe House in Stowe, Buckinghamshire; at the village church of St Nicholas at Moreton, Dorset, where every window was engraved by him over about 30 years; and in the Corning Museum of Glass (USA).

In 1947, Whistler created one of the wedding gifts for Princess Elizabeth, a glass goblet engraved with the words of a 1613 poem by Thomas Campion, written for the marriage of Elizabeth of Bohemia, daughter of James I.

== Honours ==
Whistler's many honours included an OBE in the 1955 New Years Honours List and a CBE in the 1973 Queen's Birthday Honours List. In the 2000 Queen's Birthday Honours List, not long before his death at the age of 88, he was created a Knight Bachelor.

In 1975, he became the first president of the newly founded British Guild of Glass Engravers.

== Personal life ==
In 1939, Whistler married the actress Jill Furse. Their son, Simon (1940–2005) was a musician and also a notable glass engraver. Jill died in 1944, of blood poisoning, soon after giving birth to a daughter, Caroline; Laurence's brother, Rex Whistler, was killed in action the same year. In 1950, he married Jill's younger sister, Theresa (1927–2007), and they had two children, Daniel and Frances; the marriage was later dissolved. In 1987, he married a third time to Carol Dawson, but was divorced in 1991. For much of his life, he lived at Little Place, Silver Street, Lyme Regis, Dorset.
