= Weldon Champneys =

English clergyman and rower

Weldon Champneys (26 August 1839 – 9 May 1892) was an English clergyman and rower who twice won Silver Goblets at Henley Royal Regatta.

Champneys was born in Whitechapel, the son of the Very Rev William Weldon Champneys (rector of St Mary Whitechapel then Dean of Lichfield) and his wife Mary Ann, fourth daughter of the goldsmith and silversmith Paul Storr. His brother Basil Champneys was an architect and author and his brother Sir Francis Champneys, 1st Baronet, a doctor. Francis Champneys was bow in Woodgate's infamous coxed four in 1868 when the cox jumped overboard. He was educated at Brasenose College, Oxford. He rowed bow in the Oxford crew in the 1861 Boat Race. Also in 1861 he partnered Walter Bradford Woodgate to win Silver Goblets at Henley Royal Regatta. The pair repeated their success in 1862.

Champneys took holy orders and in 1881 was vicar of Haslingden, rural dean for Whalley and proctor in convocation for the Archdeaconry of Blackburn. He was honorary canon of Manchester Cathedral.

Champneys married Frances Sophia Feilden in Kensington on 1879. Champneys died at Haslingden at the age of 52.

== See also ==
- List of Oxford University Boat Race crews
