= Rex Whistler =

British painter and illustrator (1905–1944)

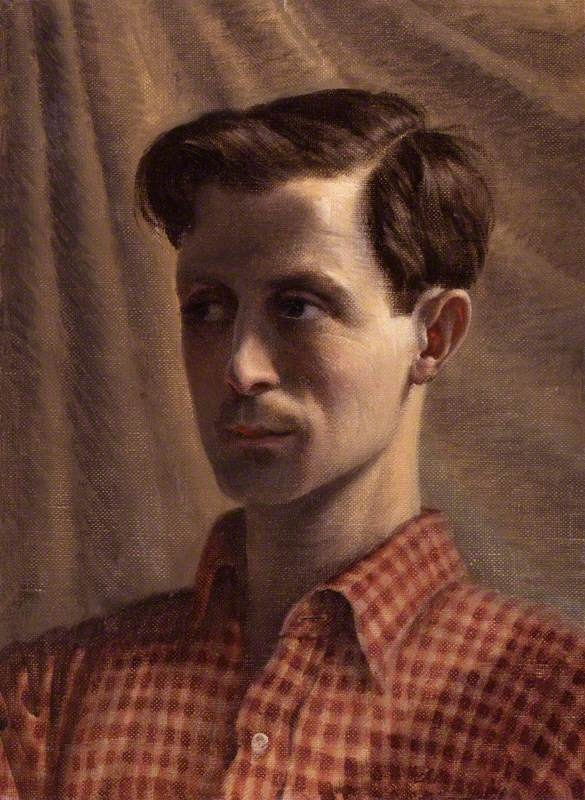
- Self-portrait, 1934
- Born: Reginald John Whistler; 24 June 1905; Eltham, Kent, England
- Died: 18 July 1944 (aged 39); Caen, Normandy, France
- Education: Haileybury College, Slade School of Art (1922)
- Known for: murals; stage design; portrait; landscape; illustration
- Notable work: Tate restaurant mural; the 58 foot 'Sea-scape Fantasy' at Plas Newydd, Isle of Anglesey
- Movement: non-conformist, baroque revival
- Relatives: Laurence Whistler (brother); Simon Whistler (nephew)
- Military career
- Allegiance: United Kingdom
- Branch: British Army
- Rank: Second lieutenant
- Units: Welsh Guards; Guards Armoured Division
- Conflicts: World War II; Operation Goodwood

Reginald John "Rex" Whistler (24 June 1905 – 18 July 1944) was a British artist who painted murals and society portraits, and designed theatrical costumes. He was killed in action in Normandy in World War II. Whistler was the brother of poet and artist Laurence Whistler.

== Biography ==
Reginald John Whistler was born in England on 24 June 1905, in Eltham, Kent (now part of the Royal Borough of Greenwich), the son of architect and estate agent Henry Whistler and Helen Frances Mary, the daughter of Rev. Charles Slegg Ward, vicar of Wootton St Lawrence, and through her mother a descendant of the goldsmith and silversmith Paul Storr.

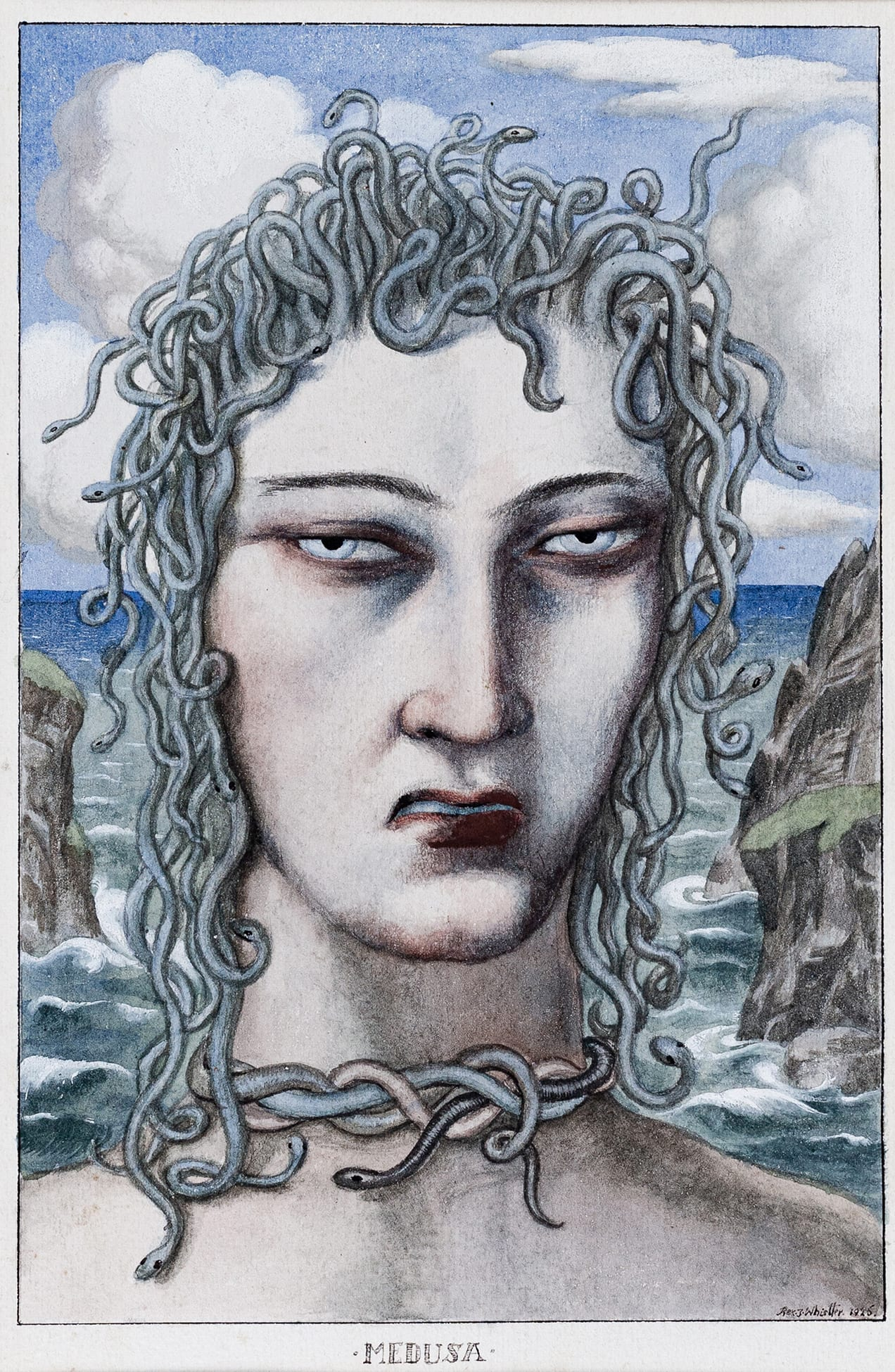
Medusa (1926), ink and watercolour

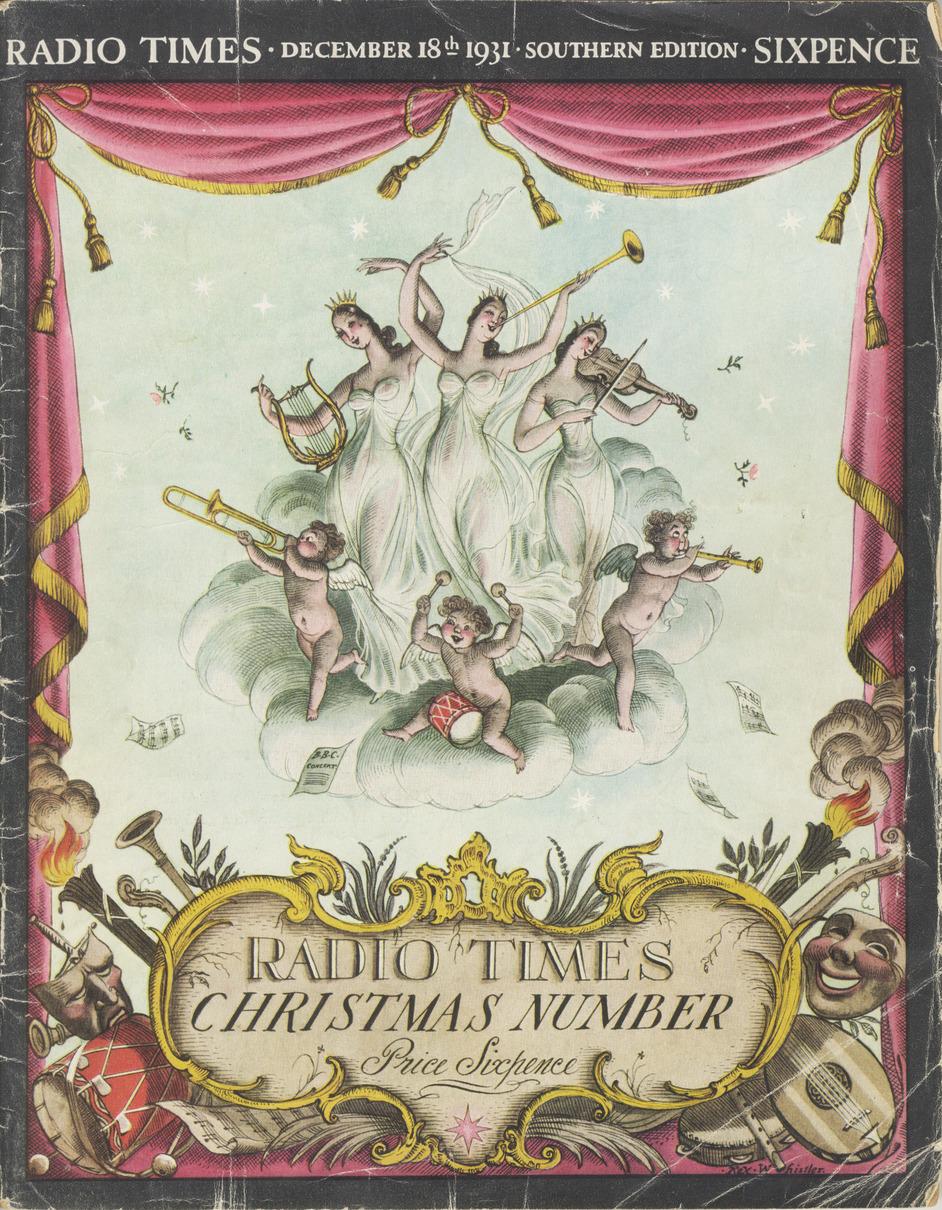
Cover of the Christmas 1931 edition of Radio Times

His best known work during the early part of his career was for the former café at the Tate Gallery, completed in 1927 when he was only 22, but now viewed by some as problematic for stereotyped depictions of black and Chinese figures. He was commissioned to produce posters and illustrations for Shell Petroleum and the Radio Times. He also created designs for Wedgwood china based on drawings he made of the Devon village of Clovelly, and costumes "after Hogarth" for the premiere production of William Walton's ballet The Wise Virgins, produced by the Sadler's Wells Company in 1940.

Whistler's elegance and wit ensured his success as a portrait artist among the fashionable; he painted many members of London society, including Edith Sitwell, Cecil Beaton and other members of the set to which he belonged that became known as the "Bright Young Things". Whistler has been described as having "a particular genius for trompe l'œil – the art of deceiving the eye, creating painted illusions so convincing they blur the line between the depicted and the real". Examples of his murals featuring trompe l'œil include those at Mottisfont Abbey, Hampshire, and Plas Newydd, Anglesey. His murals for Edwina Mountbatten's 30-room luxury flat in Brook House, Park Lane, London, were later installed by the Mountbattens' son-in-law, decorator David Hicks, in his own houses.

== Second World War ==
When war broke out, although he was 35, Whistler was eager to join the army. He was commissioned into the Welsh Guards as a Second lieutenant in June 1940. He served in the Guards Armoured Division.

During the war, he was the burial officer of his regiment, and his soldiers became somewhat suspicious of the 20 crosses he carried on his tank. He decided that just because he was at war, it did not mean he could not paint, and he therefore also carried a bucket hanging off the side of his tank for his paintbrushes.

=== Death ===
Whistler is said to have predicted his own death. Just days before he was killed, he remarked to a friend that he wanted to be buried where he fell, not in a military cemetery. On the night before his death, a fellow officer named Francis Portal came up to him, and they talked for a while. Before they parted, Portal remarked, "So we'll probably see each other tomorrow evening." Wistfully, Whistler replied, "I hope so." He was killed on 18 July 1944, after he left his tank to go to the aid of other men in his unit. His body now lies in Section III, Row F, Grave 22 of Banneville-la-Campagne War Cemetery, situated 10 kilometres (6 miles) east of Caen. Reportedly, The Times received more letters about Whistler's death than for any other war victim.

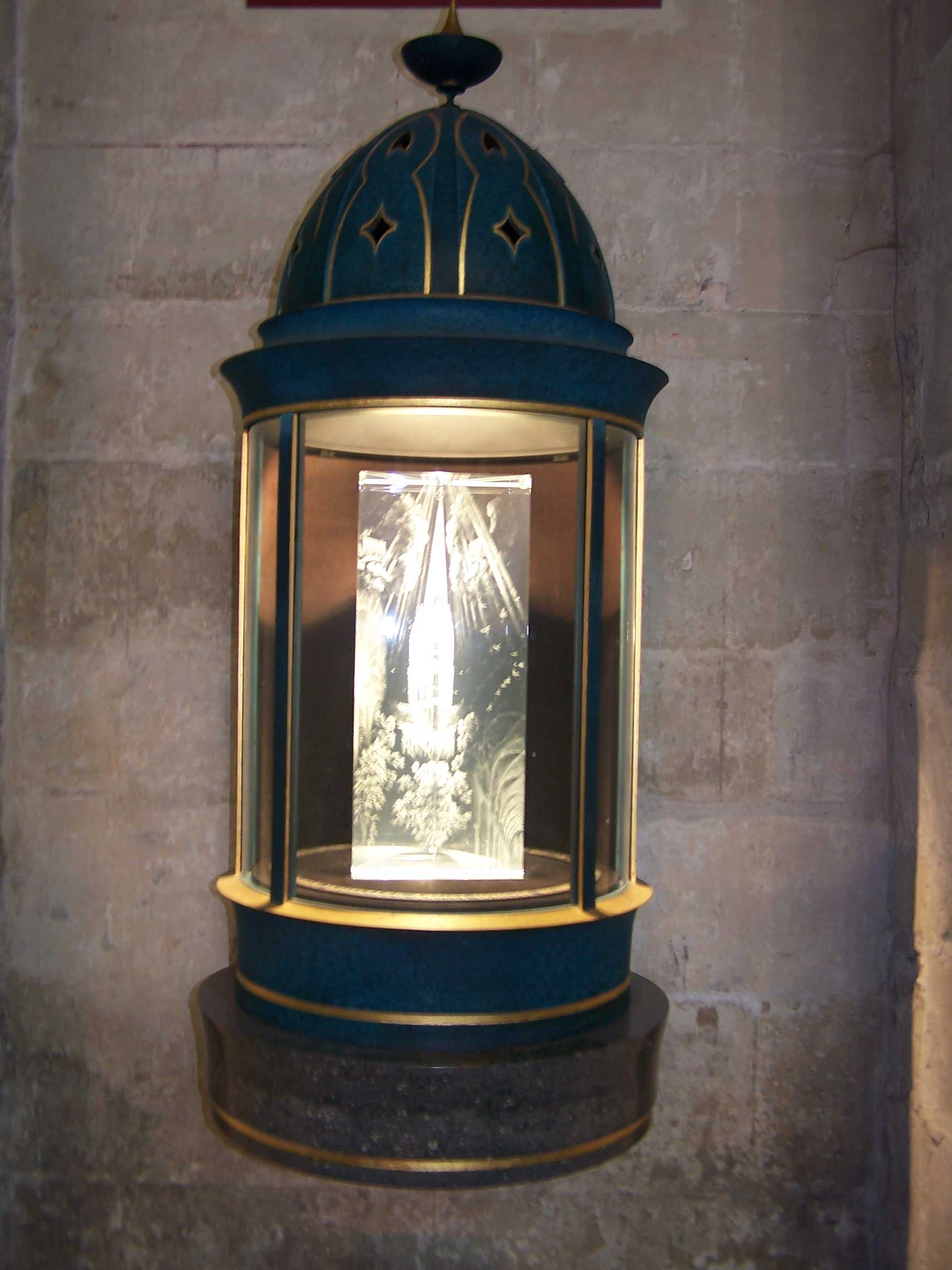
The Rex Prism at Salisbury Cathedral

A memorial glass engraving by his brother, Laurence Whistler (the Rex prism) was placed at the Morning Chapel at Salisbury Cathedral. Laurence also wrote a biography of his brother The Laughter and the Urn (1985).

Whistler's death is mentioned in a letter to Alec Guinness in Sir John Gielgud A Life in Letters, edited by Richard Mangan (Arcade Publishing 2004), p. 75. Gielgud notes that "Whistler's death is a major tragedy" adding that "He wanted to prove that 'artists can be tough' and alas, he has done so—but the world is greatly the poorer for his sacrifice".

== Archive ==
In 2013, the Salisbury and South Wiltshire Museum acquired an archive, compiled by Laurence Whistler after Rex's death, consisting of thousands of drawings, book illustrations, stage and mural designs and other material by Whistler. The museum mounted an exhibition based on this material in the summer of 2013.

== Works ==
- An Anthology of Mine (published posthumously), London: Hamish Hamilton (1981)
- Self-Portrait in Welsh Guards Uniform, oil on canvas (May 1940)
- OHO!, reversible drawing with words by Laurence Whistler. London: John Lane, The Bodley Head (1946)
- "Capriccio" in the dining room at Plas Newydd the historic home of the Marquess of Anglesey in North Wales now part of the National Trust (1938)
- The Expedition in Pursuit of Rare Meats, mural. London: Tate Britain (commissioned 1927). The mural has become controversial due to its depiction of slavery and stereotypical Chinese figures.
- Ave Silvae Dornii, Dorneywood House, Buckinghamshire, now part of the National Trust. This large painting (78 x 81 inches; 198.1 × 205.7 cm) is positioned to give the impression you are looking straight through the house into the garden when you enter through the front door. It was commissioned by the 1st Baron Courtauld-Thomson (1928).
