= Jonathan Kimberley =

Jonathan Kimberley (7 June 1651 – 7 March 1720) was Dean of Lichfield from 1713 until his death.

Born in Bromsgrove, Smallwood was educated at Pembroke College, Oxford. He migrated to Cambridge in 1776. He held livings at Stadhampton, Coventry, Baginton, Leamington Hastings and Tatenhill.

Kimberley was appointed Chaplain to the Speaker of the House of Commons by Speaker William Bromley in 1710, and then Dean of Lichfield in 1713.

He died in Tatenhill in 1720.

Church of England titles
Preceded by William Binckes	Dean of Lichfield; 1713 –1720	Succeeded by William Walmesley
