= Frederic Iremonger =

Anglican priest (1878–1952)

Frederic Athelwold Iremonger (8 July 1878 – 15 September 1952) was an Anglican priest.

Iremonger was born in Longparish, Hampshire, the third son of William Henry (1845–1911) and Mary Sophia Iremonger of Wherwell Priory Hampshire, who were first cousins. He was educated at Clifton and Keble College, Oxford. Ordained in 1906 he began his career with a curacy at All Saints', Poplar after which he was Priest in charge at St Nicholas, Blackwall. Later he was Vicar of St James the Great, Bethnal Green and then Rector of Quarley.

In 1918, he accompanied Dr Cosmo Lang then Archbishop of York as chaplain and secretary on an important mission to the USA. On his return he joined and became chairman in 1919 (president in 1922) of the Life and Liberty Movement begun by Dr William Temple and Dick Sheppard in 1917.

In 1923, he came to London to take up his appointment as editor of the Guardian, a Church of England weekly newsletter. However, his strengths lay in writing rather than in administration of a newspaper and after four years he resigned and returned to a country parish.

In 1933, he was appointed Director of Religion at the BBC, where he had "immense success" bringing about a notable rise in the standard of religious broadcasting and being appointed an Honorary Chaplain to the King in 1936. A year later he was the sole radio-reporter at the coronation of George VI and Elizabeth. He held his post at the BBC until 1939 when having exceeded the BBC's age limit (60) he again retired to a small country parish.

Within a few months, Iremonger was elevated to the Deanery of Lichfield Cathedral. "He did not settle down easily to Cathedral life and its traditions". He died in that post, aged 73, on 15 September 1952. "His strong and attractive character and undemonstrative piety impressed all who knew him and gained him a host of friends".

His biography of William Temple, Archbishop of Canterbury, published in 1948 "earned much praise and deserved much gratitude".

== Publications (selected) ==
- William Temple, Archbishop of Canterbury - his life and letters. Oxford University Press. 1948.

Church of England titles
| Preceded by Henry Edwin Savage | Dean of Lichfield; 1939 –1952 | Succeeded by William Stuart MacPherson |
