= Thomas Wood (bishop of Lichfield and Coventry) =

English churchman

The Right Reverend Thomas Wood
- Bishop of Lichfield and Coventry
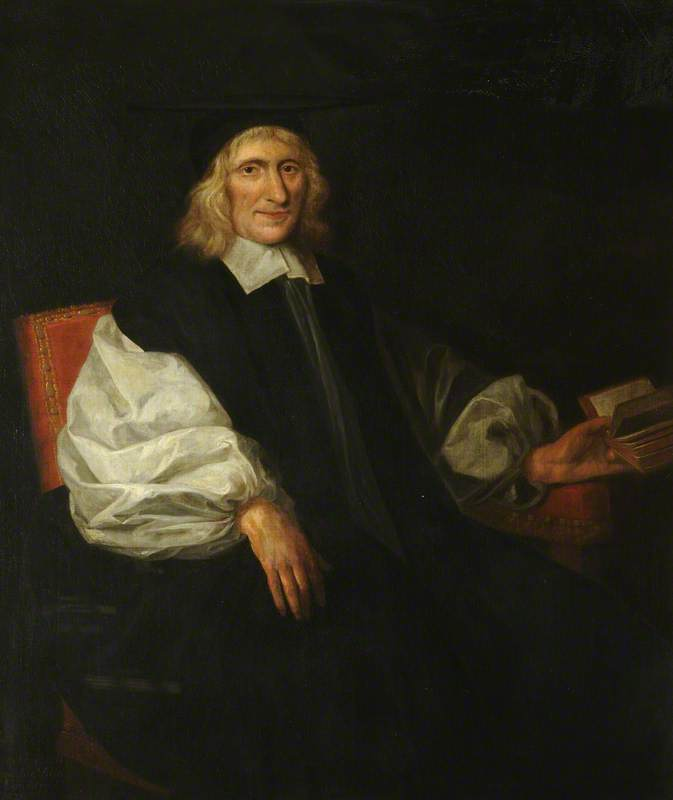
- Bishop Wood, by Sir Peter Lely
- Diocese: Diocese of Lichfield and Coventry
- In office: 1671–1692
- Predecessor: John Hacket
- Successor: William Lloyd
- Other post: Dean of Lichfield (1664–1671)

Orders
- Consecration: 2 July 1671 by Gilbert Sheldon

Personal details
- Born: 1607
- Died: 1692 (aged 84–85)
- Denomination: Anglican
- Spouse: Grace Clavering
- Education: Westminster School
- Alma mater: Christ Church, Oxford

Thomas Wood (1607–1692) was an English churchman, Bishop of Lichfield and Coventry from 1671 to 1692.

== Life ==
Thomas was the third son of Thomas Wood (1565–1649) and Susanna Cranmer (1570–1650). He was baptised on 22 July 1607 in the Church of St. John's in then fashionable Hackney, where his grandfather Henry had bought land and built a country house at Clapton on the edge of Hackney Downs.

Edmond Chester Waters writes in 1877:

He was educated at Westminster School amongst the King's Scholars, and was elected in 1627 to a studentship at Christ Church, Oxford, where he proceeded B.A. on 27 April 1631, and M.A. on 24 April 1634. He had in the meantime taken Holy Orders, and was, by the influence of his family at Court, appointed at the age of 28 a chaplain in ordinary to the King, who presented him in the same year, on 2 July 1635, to the Rectory of Whickham in the county of Durham. He proceeded B.D. on 15 May 1641, and was created D.D. by dispensation on 13 March in the next year.

About the same time he obtained from Charles I a royal mandate to the Bishop of Durham to present him on the next vacancy to a prebendal stall in his cathedral, but before this appointment was completed, his course of preferment was interrupted by the Civil War, and he was ejected from his living by the Parliament. He employed this period of compulsory leisure in travelling abroad, and spent some years in Italy. He made a long stay at Rome, where he was confirmed in that strong dislike of Popery and High Church observance which distinguished him through life. After his return to England he lived in retirement on his patrimony at Hackney until the Restoration, when he was restored to the Rectory of Whickham by the House of Commons. At the same time he was reinstated as one of the chaplains in ordinary at Court, and on 15 June 1660 he made petition to the King to give effect to the mandate of Charles I. by bestowing upon him the Prebend at Durham, which had been vacant since the death of the Bishop of Exeter on 7 December 1659. His suit was supported by the powerful influence of his brother Sir Henry Wood, and he was presented on 7 July 1660 to the 11th stall in Durham Cathedral. He was duly installed on 10 December. following, and held this preferment in commendam until his death. In February 1663-4 he was promoted to the Deanery of Lichfield, when Dr. Paul was made Bishop of Oxford.

The Dean married, about Michaelmas 1666, Grace Clavering, the youngest sister of Sir James Clavering Bart. of Axwell Park, who was his parishioner at Whickham. The disagreements arising from their disparity of 29 years were maliciously dwelt upon by his brother Canons. The Tanner Mss. in the Bodleian contain a mass of correspondence relating to Dr. Wood, and it is difficult to decide whether he was more detested at Lichfield or Durham. His puritanical principles made him hateful to the Bishops of both dioceses, who were High Churchmen, and were zealously engaged in restoring the fabric and ornaments of their cathedrals, whilst his personal meanness and avarice were a bye-word with his brother Prebendaries. And there is no doubt that the Dean was a constant invalid, although he lived to a great age. It is not surprising that the Dean's wife was of one mind with her husband in his puritanical opinions and his partiality to the Nonconformists, for all her family associations were connected with the extreme Protestant party at Newcastle upon Tyne.

He was now living in open warfare with the residing Canons of Lichfield, who served him on 19 February 1667–8 with formal articles of complaint. The success with which the Dean set at defiance all complaints of his conduct, and his brother's position at Court, caused then a general expectation at Durham and Lichfield that he would be promoted to the next vacant bishopric. And that was realised in the following year, for when Sir Henry Wood concluded with Lord Treasurer Clifford the treaty for the marriage of his only surviving child Mary to the King's eldest son by the Duchess of Cleveland, it was part of the bargain that the vacant bishopric of Lichfield should be given to his brother. Accordingly, the Dean was elected Bishop of Lichfield and Coventry on 9 June 1671, and was consecrated at Lambeth on 2 July by the Archbishop of Canterbury. At the same time and place, Dr. Nathaniel Crew (afterwards Lord Crew and Bishop of Durham) was consecrated Bishop of Oxford. He was a prelate of the same type as Bishop Wood, and resembled him in many circumstances of his career. They were both cadets of influential families, and owed their advancement to family interest at Court without any pretension to professional merit. Both eventually succeeded to great estates of inheritance, and died without issue. Each of these Bishops was regarded by the Clergy of his time as a scandal to his order and the Church, but is remembered for munificence and for charitable foundations which are still in existence.

Bishop Wood was a great benefactor to Christ Church, Oxford, for he contributed liberally in his lifetime to the rebuilding of the large quadrangle and by his Will he left in trust for students lands of above 200 l. a year, and 3000 l. in money. His arms are graven on the gateway at Christ Church, and his portrait by Lely hangs in the College Hall. He also built two hospitals for the aged poor, one at Clapton, and the other at Ufford. And his Will contained charitable bequests to the poor of Durham, Chester, Whickham, and Hackney.

== His family ==
In his last years Bishop Wood defended his kinsman Anthony Wood against an attack by Bishop Gilbert Burnet. The Wood family came from Lancashire and the name Wood is common amongst the yeomanry. Anthony Wood relates in his diaries that the family arrived in Oxfordshire in the household of the 6th Earl of Derby. The precise relationship between both branches of the family is not yet established, but it is known that the Bishop's grandfather Henry served in the household of Elizabeth I. At a very early age his father served there too, was Clerk of the Queen's Pastry in 1601 and was promoted Sergeant in the next reign. After the Restoration the Bishop's generation became people of consequence.

The eldest brother of Bishop Wood, Sir Henry Wood 1st Bt. (1597–1671) became a great landowner, who was not tempted by the bargains of the time, because his purchases were confined to voluntary sales by private owners. They include the manor and advowson of Whepsted, the manor and priory of Campsey, and the manors of Ufford, Syleham, Staverton, Eyke, Blyford, Hollesley-cum-Sutton, Dunningsworth, Elmeswell, Woolpit, and Drinkeston, all in Suffolk. He chose as his seat Loudham Park in the parish of Ufford, Suffulk. As Treasurer in the Royal Household he did not desert Queen Henrietta Maria (1609–1669) when fortunes were at their lowest ebb or because his salary had long been unpaid; he even advanced out money of his own resources for payment. His long and faithful services to the Royal Family - and that of his wife Mary Gardiner (1627–1665) and his daughter Mary (1664–1680), were not forgotten. The settlement for his daughter's marriage was beneficial to both parties, and was executed on 23d May 1671. The next day Sir Henry made his Will and the day after that he died. When Mary was 16 she was to be at full liberty to break off altogether the marriage provided for her, but in that case she was to forfeit 20,000 l. to the young Earl of Southampton (1662–1730) out of the savings of her minority. That same year the provision was set aside by the then all-powerful Duchess of Cleveland, the Earl's mother, and the marriage was celebrated, notwithstanding their ages, only 9 and 7. Mary died ten years later of smallpox, when she was scarcely 17, and was - like her mother - buried in Westminster Abbey.

A similar settlement was attempted between another natural child of the King and Charles Wood alias Cranmer (1665–1743), grandson of Lady Chester who was the Bishop's sister and who as trustee protested to no result the manoeuvrings of the Duchess in the House of Lords. In that dispute her co-trustee, the then Dean of Lichfield, stood passive. The new settlement needed the Bishop's commitment, but again he refused to decide; so, it fell apart. The family fortune was indeed Charles's inheritance after the death of his father, Sir Caesar Wood alias Cranmer Kt. (1634–1707), and he passed it on to another Lady Chester, Bertha Webb (1683–1743), the granddaughter of the Bishop's youngest sister Elizabeth.

The bishop's brother and second son John Wood (1599–1651) was a brewer at Hackney. He had issue five children; his only son died in 1668 at the age of 33. Only his eldest daughter Mary, Mrs. Kirke, survived when his wife died in 1675.

The bishop's sister, Mary Wood (1604–1684), eldest daughter first married at St. Margaret's Westminster on 4 July 1633 widower Samuel Cranmer (1575–1640), proprietor of the Swan Brewery, who was Alderman of Cripplegate Ward when he served as one of the Sheriffs of London and Middlesex. He brought to the marriage the manorial estate of Upper Itchington in Warwickshire and the mansion and manor of Astwoodbury in Buckinghamshire, the seat of the family. To his only sister Anne and her husband Lewis Cawdry he left his father's leasehold estate at Alcester, where he was born. His son Caesar was 6 years old, when he died; the management of his estates was entrusted to his uncle Sir Henry. His mother married 6 years later Sir Henry Chester K.B. (1597–1669).

Caesar's education involved travelling abroad, and he made a long stay at Paris, where Sir Henry resided. He was graciously received by the exiled Queen and was high in her favour when he married some years later one of the ladies of her Court, Lelis de la Garde (1642–1726); a position she held until her death. Dame Lelis continued to reside at Somerset House with her only surviving daughter Anne (1668–1723) until the reign of the Stuart's ended, when she purchased the lease of Lady Dover's house in the parish of St. Paul's, Covent Garden, where she died. Caesar brought his wife to England in 1660 in the train of the Royal Family and was appointed one of the Equerries in the household of the Duchess of York; he was promoted to the rank of her Chief Equerry when Maria d’Este, the new Duchess, became Queen. The Revolution of 1688 deprived Sir Caesar of his place at Court, but earlier his prospects – Loudham Park and 4300 l. a year - had been improved by the death of his cousin Mary, the Duchess of Southampton, when he became entitled in reversion to the great estate of Sir Henry Wood, subject to the life-interest of his uncle the Bishop. In compliance with Sir Henry's Will he had assumed the name of Wood. But within the next few months he encountered a more serious reverse of fortune; for in 1689 the Duke of Southampton was advised to claim a life-interest in the estates of his deceased wife and filed a bill in Chancery to enforce his rights. The Lords Commissioners made in 1692 a decree in favour of the Duke. Sir Caesar appealed to the House of Lords and in the same year they pronounced final judgment; declaring that the Duke's interest had determined on his wife's death, and that in the actual state of facts (which had not been provided for by Sir Henry Wood) the right of Sir Caesar under the Will did not accrue until the Duke's death, and in the meantime the rents and profits belonged to Sir Henry's heirs-at-law (then only the sons of Sir Henry's two sisters, Lady Chester and Mrs. Webb, were alive).

Church of England titles
Preceded by William Paul	Dean of Lichfield; 1664–1671	Succeeded by Matthew Smallwood
Preceded by John Hacket	Bishop of Lichfield; 1671–1692	Succeeded by William Lloyd
