= Binckes =

Binckes is a surname. Notable people with the surname include:

- Jacob Binckes (1637–1677), Dutch naval officer
- William Binckes (bapt. 1653–1712), English cleric
