= Nicholas Penny (priest) =

English priest (1674-1745)

Nicholas Penny (18 September 1674 – 18 January 1745) was Dean of Lichfield from 1730 until his death.

Penny was born in St Dunstan-in-the-West, City of London and educated at Queens' College, Cambridge. He held livings at Hardwick, Cambridgeshire, Hickling, Nottinghamshire and Beddington, Surrey. He died in Beddington in 1745.

Church of England titles
Preceded by William Walmesley	Dean of Lichfield; 1730 –1745	Succeeded by John Addenbrooke
