= Margaret MacPherson (writer) =

New Zealand journalist, editor and writer

Margaret Louise MacPherson (née Kendall; 19 June 1895 – 14 September 1974) was a New Zealand journalist, editor and writer.

== Biography ==
Kendall was born in Leeds, England, in 1895. She was educated at University of St Andrews, Scotland.

She married Alfred Sinclair MacPherson, elder brother of Rev. William MacPherson, Dean of Lichfield. The new couple later moved to New Zealand. Together, they had five sons.

After the birth of her children, she became the writer of a column called 'Wahine', in the Maoriland Worker. In the early 1920s she began editing Northlander in Kaitaia. In 1925 she and her husband divorced. Next she took a position writing the women's column in Guardian, also in Kaitaia. Other positions took her to several countries. She also wrote several books.

She died in Kaitaia, New Zealand, in 1974.

== Activism ==
In 2013, MacPherson's grandson, Reynold MacPherson, wrote Lovers and Husbands and What-Not: A Biography of Margaret L. MacPherson, which outlines her activism leading the New Zealand Movement against War and Fascism. The book also discusses the many other causes she took up in her lifetime, including indigenous rights, equal rights for women, and Marxism.

== Selected works ==
- A Symposium Against War (1934)
- Antipodean Journey (1937)
- I Heard the Anzacs Singing (1942)
- New Zealand Beckons (1952)
