= Robert Say =

English academic administrator

Robert Say D.D. (died 24 November 1691) was an English academic administrator at the University of Oxford.

Elected Provost (head) of Oriel College, Oxford on 23 March 1653, he held the post until his death in 1691. While Provost, Say was Vice-Chancellor of Oxford University from 1664 until 1666.

Academic offices
Preceded by John Saunders	Provost of Oriel College, Oxford; 1653–1691	Succeeded by George Royse
Preceded by Walter Blandford	Vice-Chancellor of Oxford University; 1664–1666	Succeeded by John Fell
