= Baginton Castle =

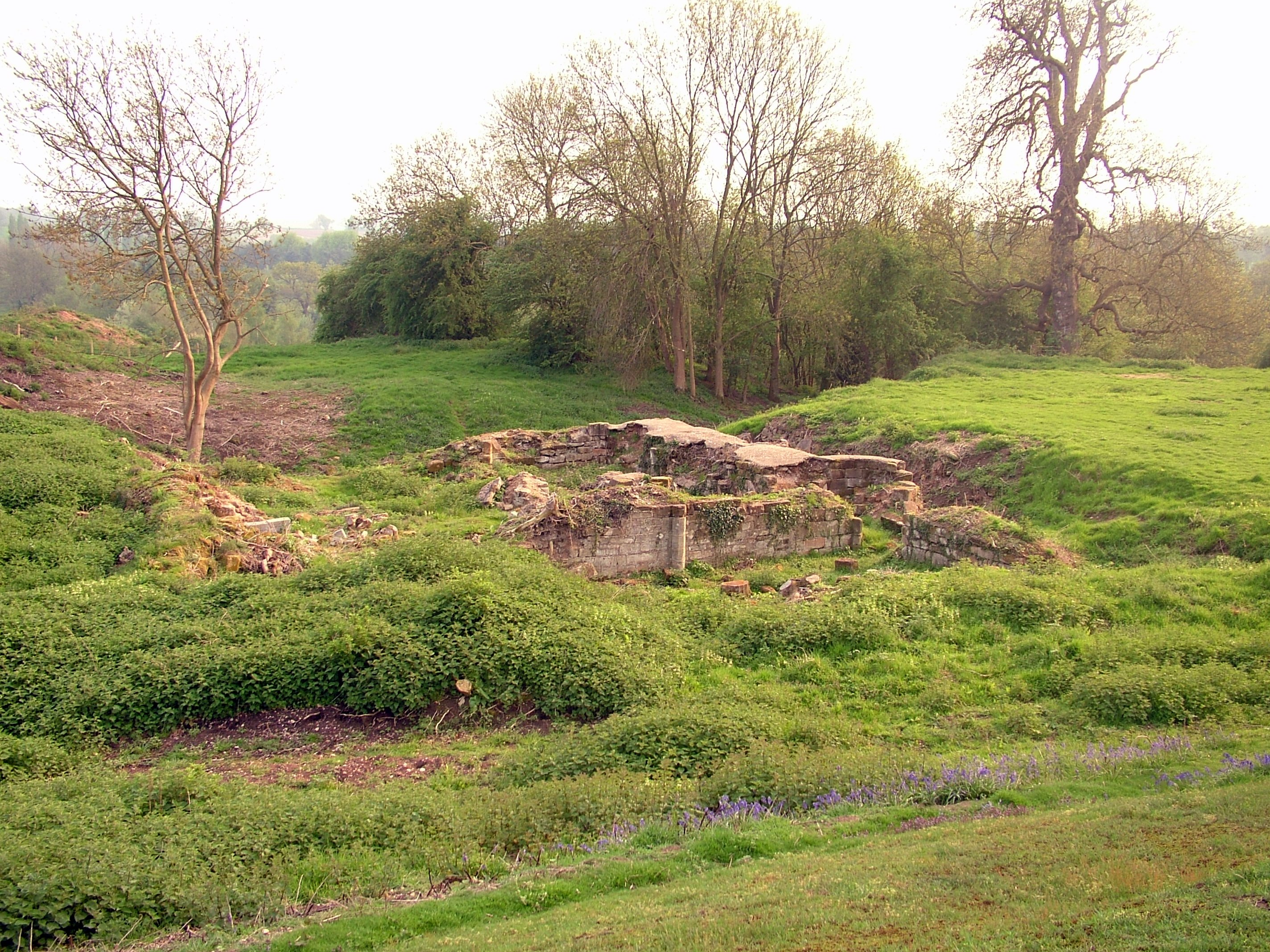
- Baginton Castle in mid-2006, pre-restoration (from the west)

- Location within Warwickshire
- 52.3697°N 1.5001°W
- Location: Baginton, Warwickshire

History
- Built: 12th century

Listed Building – Grade II
- Official name: Ruins of Castle 160 yards west of Church of St John the Baptist
- Designated: 11 April 1967
- Reference no.: 1035269

Scheduled monument
- Official name: Baginton Castle, associated settlement remains, ponds and mill sites
- Designated: 16 October 1936
- Reference no.: 1011193

Baginton Castle, also known as Bagot's Castle, is a ruined castle in Baginton, Warwickshire, England. It was originally built in the 12th century by Geoffrey Savage and it was rebuilt as a stone keep during the late 14th century. The surviving ruin that can be seen is of a late 14th-century house, but it is not well known because of its location in an area of woodland. No earthworks or ruins survive of the 12th-century motte and bailey, although its location has been identified.

== History ==
The original motte and bailey was built at Baginton on the site of a 7th-century house by Geoffrey Savage in the 12th century during the reign of Henry I. A dwelling house was also erected on the site.

By the 14th century, this castle was in disrepair and it was demolished and rebuilt as a stone keep around 1397 by Sir William Bagot. Henry Percy, 1st Earl of Northumberland, was imprisoned at Baginton Castle following his son Harry Hotspur's defeat at the Battle of Shrewsbury on 21 July 1403.

The castle was in disrepair by the 16th century, with some of its stones removed for use in other local buildings. It was described by John Leland in 1540 as 'desolate'. Francis Goodere purchased the castle in 1544 and passed it down to his son Henry after his death. Henry Goodere had an extravagant lifestyle and to raise cash he sold the castle and its surrounding land to Sir William Bromley in 1618.

By 1706, most of the surviving earthworks of the 12th-century motte had been levelled and were replaced by a pleasure garden; during the 18th century, the ruins were being used as a pigsty. Between 1933 and 1948, the 14th-century keep was excavated, but it was eventually overgrown by shrubs again.

It was fully excavated in 2009 to how it is today and it was also opened to the public during the same year. 15th- and 16th-century earthworks of the surrounding village and the 7th-century house destroyed to make way for the castle have also survived. Part of the ditch also survives on the eastern side and the site of the 12th-century motte and bailey has been identified to probably lie within the site of the gazebo.

The remains are designated as a Grade II listed building and Scheduled Monument.

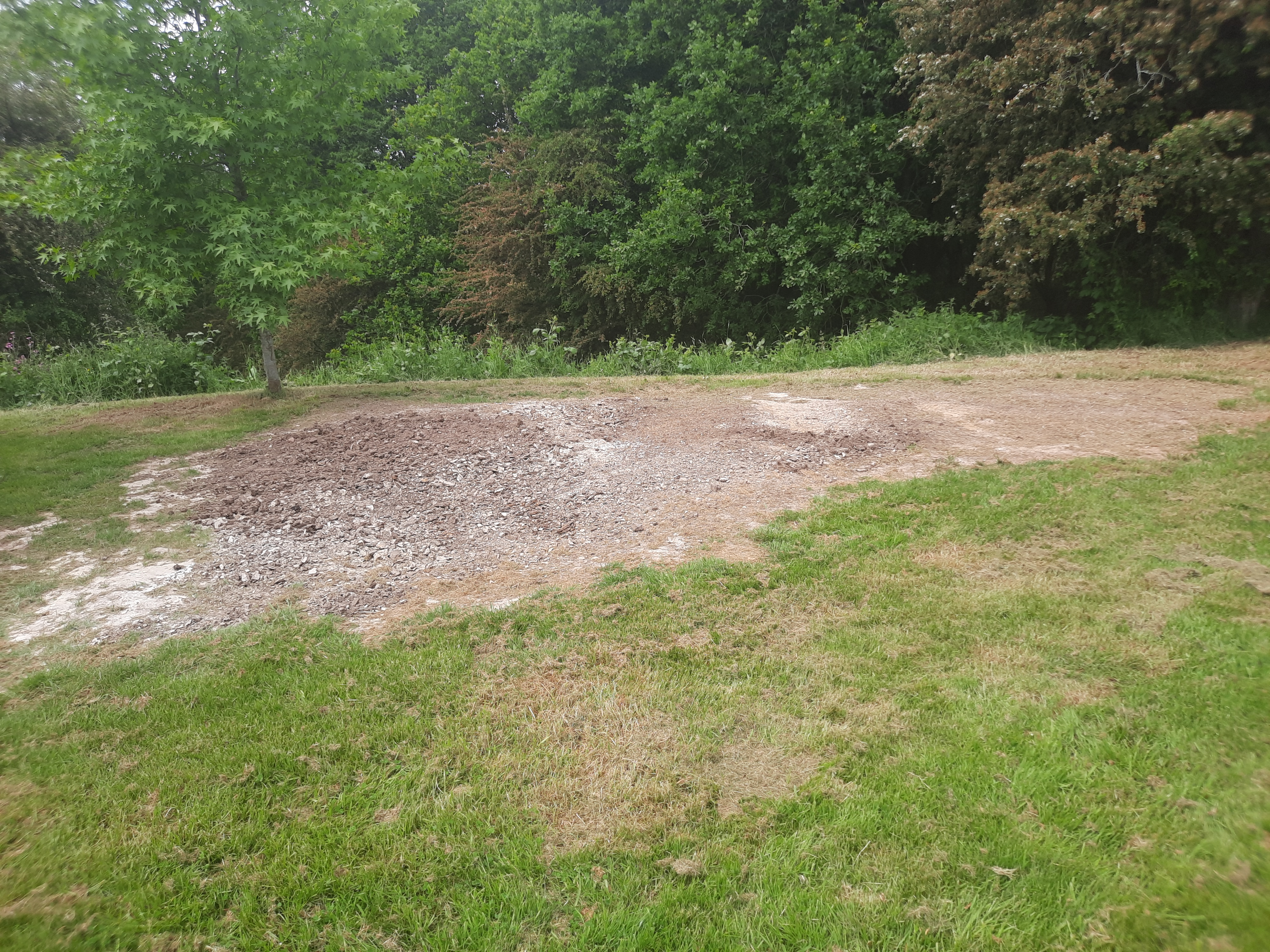
Probable site of a tower from Geoffrey Savage's original motte and bailey; currently adjacent to the 19th-century gazebo ruins, 2023

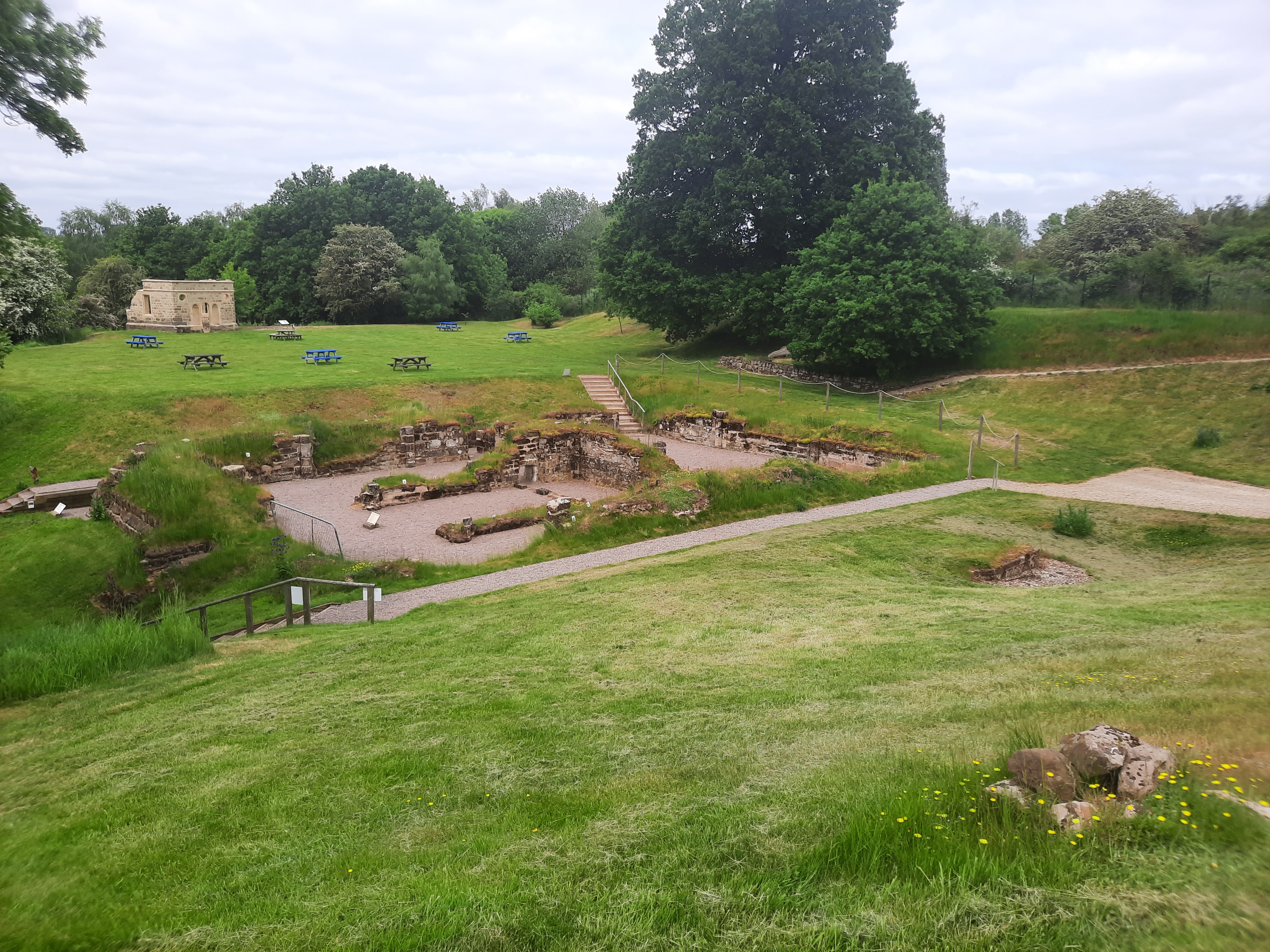
Baginton Castle in May 2023, post-restoration (from the south)

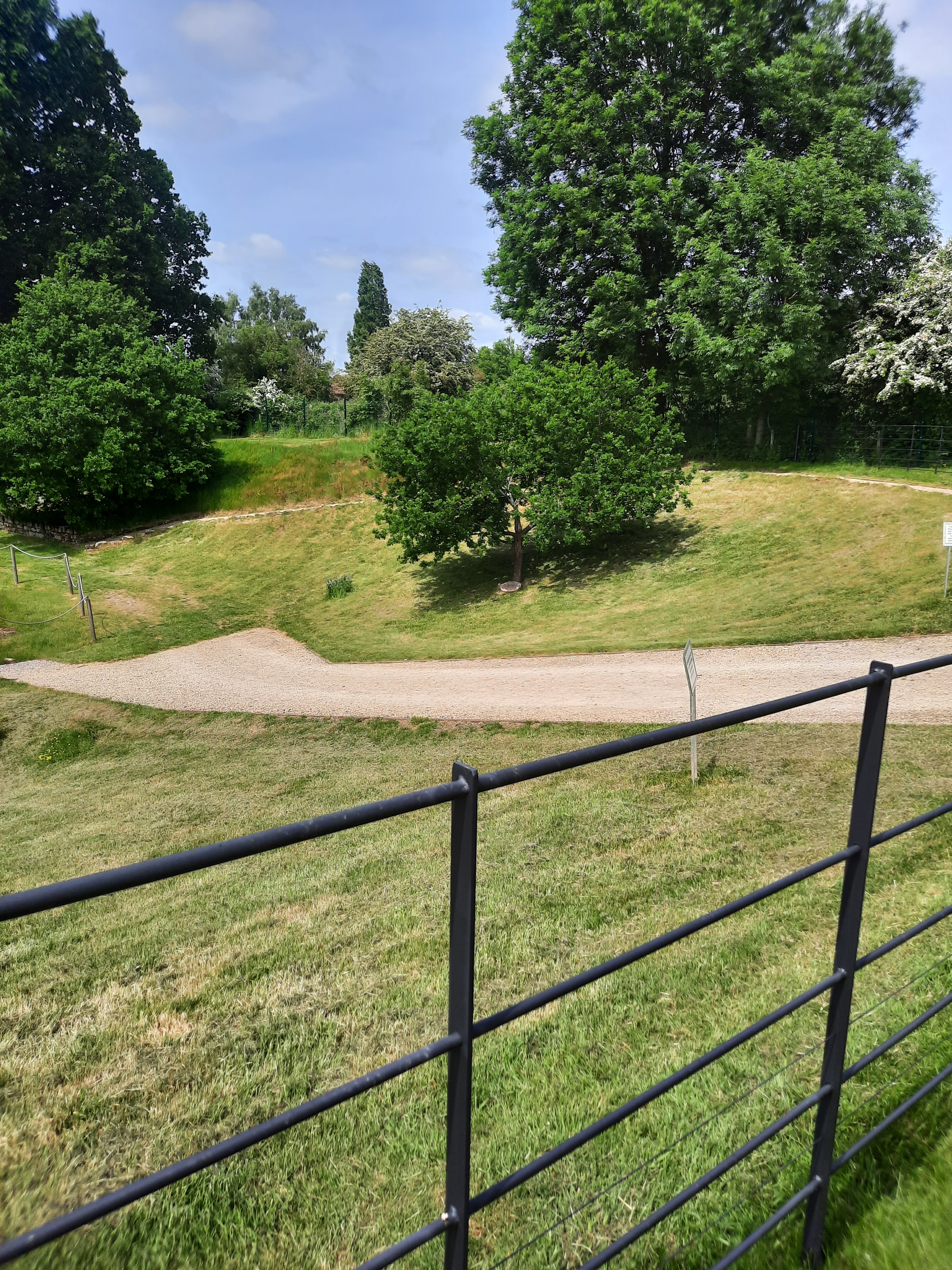
Surviving easterly ditch of the 14th-century castle in 2023
