= Matthew Smallwood =

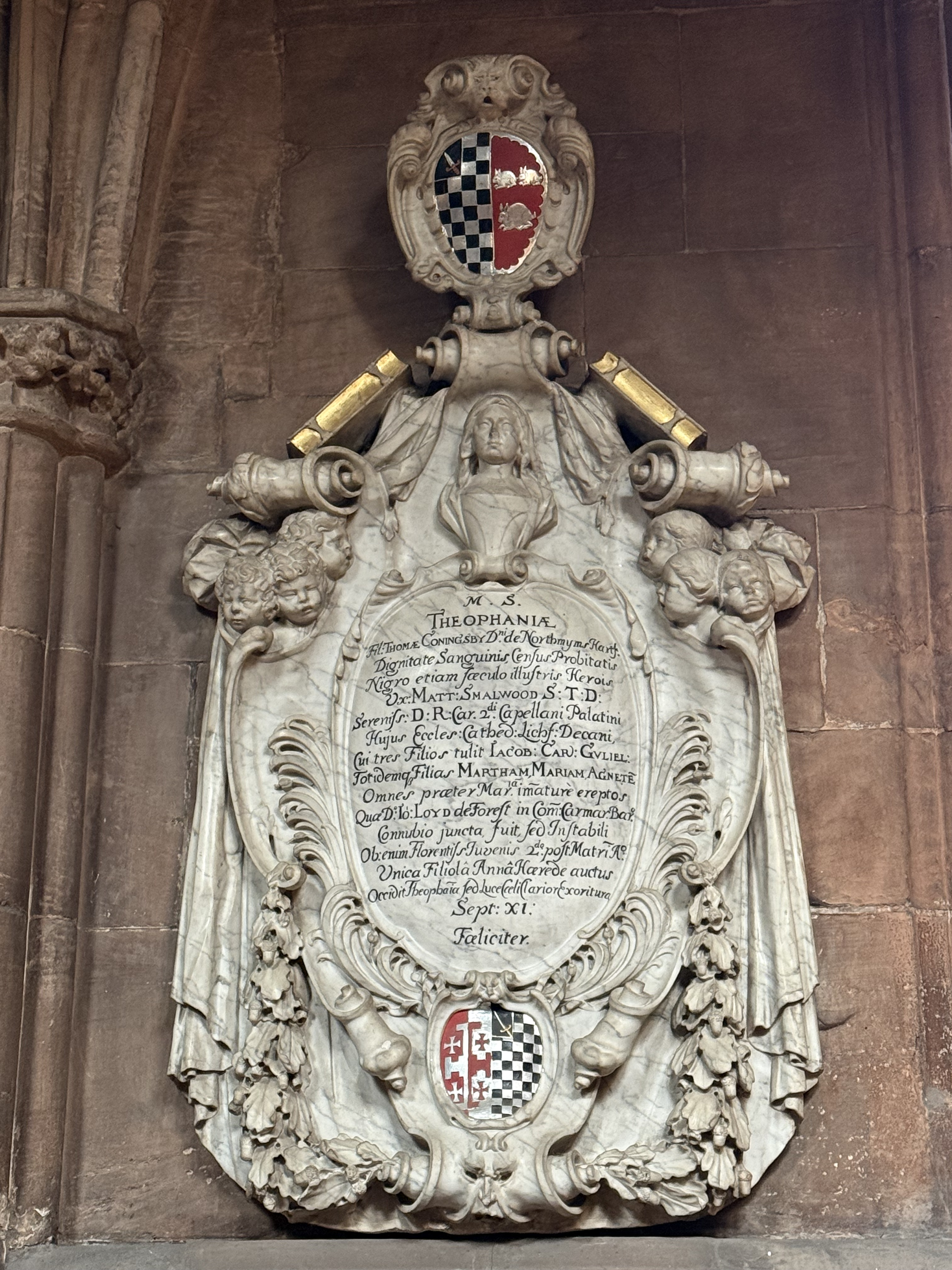
Memorial in Lichfield Cathedral to Theophania Coningsby, wife of Matthew Smallwood, Dean of Lincoln 1671 –1683, daughter of Thomas Coningsby (1591-1654) of North Mymns, Hertfordshire

Matthew Smallwood, (born Middlewick 15 February 1614; died 26 April 1683), was Dean of Lichfield from 1671 until his death.

Smallwood was educated at Brasenose College, Oxford. He was Chaplain to Charles II and Canon of St Paul's. He held livings in the City of London (St Martin Orgar), Halsall and Gawsworth.

He married Theophania Coningsby (b. 4 February 1625), daughter of Thomas Coningsby, Lord of North-Mims, Hertfordshire, and Martha Button, on 28 May 1650 in St Giles-without-Cripplegate, London. They had the following children:

- Jacob (died in infancy)
- Charles (died in infancy)
- William (died in infancy)
- Martha, married Sir John Lloyd, 2nd Baronet of Woking Surrey, Surrey and of the Forest, Carmarthen
- Mary (died in infancy)
- Agnes (died in infancy)

Church of England titles
Preceded by Thomas Wood	Dean of Lichfield; 1671 –1683	Succeeded by Lancelot Addison
