= Dean of Lichfield =

Chief priest of Lichfield Cathedral

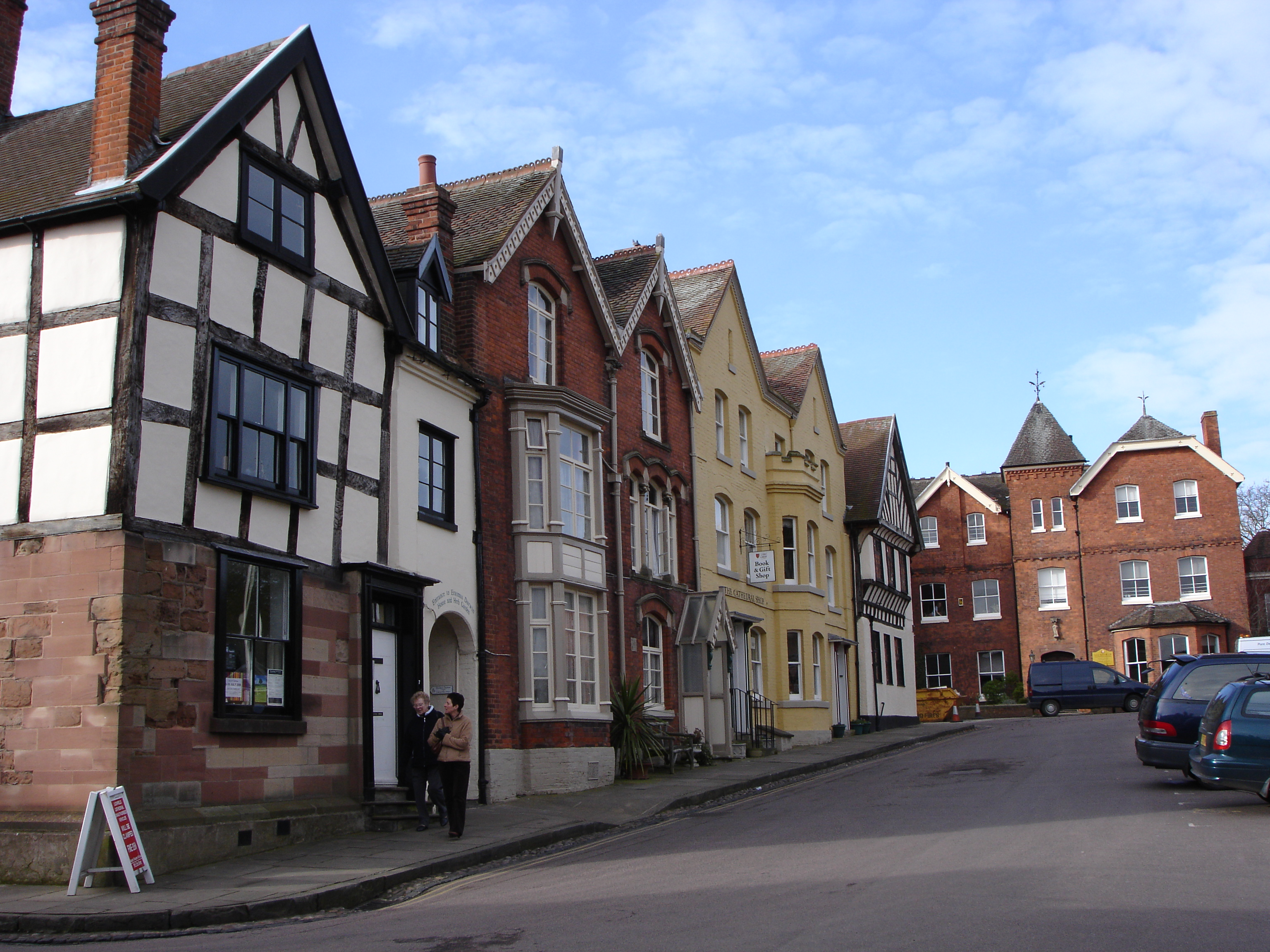
The cathedral close at Lichfield

The Dean of Lichfield is the head (primus inter pares – first among equals) and chair of the chapter of canons, the ruling body of Lichfield Cathedral. The dean and chapter are based at the Cathedral Church of the Blessed Virgin Mary and St Chad in Lichfield. The cathedral is the mother church of the Diocese of Lichfield and seat of the Bishop of Lichfield. The current dean is Jan McFarlane, since 21 September 2024.

== List of deans ==
=== Early mediaeval ===
- 1222–1254 William de Manecestra
- 1254–? Ralph de Sempringham

=== Mediaeval ===
- 1280–1319 John de Derby
- 1319–1324 Stephen Seagrave
  (afterwards Archbishop of Armagh)
- 1324–1328 Roger de Convenis
- 1328–1335 John Garssia
  (afterwards Bishop of Marseille)
- 1335–1346 Richard FitzRalph
- 1346–1347 John of Thoresby
- 1347–1349 Simon de Brisele
  (afterwards Dean of Lincoln)
- 1350–1363 John Bokyngham
- 1364–1369 William de Manton
- 1369–? Laurence de Ibstock
- ?–1370 Anthony Rous
- 1371–1378 Francis de Teobaldeschi
- 1381–1390 William Pakington
- 1390–1426 Thomas de Stretton
- 1426–1432 Robert Wolveden
- 1432–1447 John Verney (probably Archdeacon of Worcester, 1438–1452), formerly Rector of Bredon in Worcestershire, and supervisor and receiver-general to Richard Beauchamp, 13th Earl of Warwick (1382–1439). He was the younger brother of Sir Richard de Verney (d.1489) of Compton Verney in Warwickshire.
- 1457–1492 Thomas Heywood

=== Early modern ===
- 1493–1512 John Yotton
- 1512–1521 Ralph Colyngwood
- 1522–1533 James Denton
- 1533–1536 Richard Sampson
- 1536–1554 Henry Williams
- 1554–1559 John Ramridge (deprived)
- 1560–1576 Laurence Nowell
- 1576–1603 George Boleyn
- July 1603–20 December 1604 (res.) James Montague (became Dean of Worcester)
- 1605–1622 William Tooker
- 1622–1628 Walter Curle
- 1628–1632 Augustine Lindsell
- 1633–1638 John Warner
- 1638–1638 Samuel Fell
- 1638–1659 Griffin Higgs
- 1661–1663 William Paul
- 1664–1671 Thomas Wood
- 1671–1683 Matthew Smallwood
- 1683–1703 Lancelot Addison
- 1703–1712 William Binckes
- 1713–1720 Jonathan Kimberley
- 1720–1730 William Walmesley
- 1730–1745 Nicholas Penny
- 1745–1776 John Addenbrooke
- 1776–1807 Baptist Proby

=== Late modern ===
- 1807–1833 John Woodhouse
- 1833–1868 Henry Howard
- 1868–1875 William Champneys
- 1875–1892 Edward Bickersteth
- 1892–1909 Herbert Luckock
- 1909–1939 Henry Savage
- 1939–1952 Frederic Iremonger
- 1954–1969 William MacPherson
- 1970–1979 George Holderness
- 1980–1993 John Lang
- 1994–1999 Tom Wright
- 1999–2005 Michael Yorke
- 2005–2023 Adrian Dorber (retired 31 March 2023)
- March–September 2012 Pete Wilcox, Acting Dean
- 2024–present Jan McFarlane (Interim, 2023–2024; instituted as substantive Dean on 21 September 2024; also an honorary assistant bishop of the diocese)
