= Robert Skinner (bishop) =

English bishop (1591–1670)

Robert Skinner (10 February 1591 – 14 June 1670) was an English bishop who served consecutively as Bishop of Bristol, Bishop of Oxford, and Bishop of Worcester.

== Life ==
He was born on 10 February 1591, the second son of Edmund Skinner, rector of Pitsford, Northamptonshire, and Bridget, daughter of Humphrey Radcliff of Warwickshire. After attending Brixworth grammar school, he was admitted scholar of Trinity College, Oxford in 1607. He graduated B.A. in 1610, and M.A. in 1614. In 1613, he was elected fellow of his college, and until his death interested himself in its welfare. He proceeded B.D. in 1621, and became preacher of St Gregory's Church, near St Paul's Cathedral. In 1628, he succeeded his father as rector of Pitsford, and shortly after was chosen by Laud to be chaplain-in-ordinary to the king. He was vicar of Launton from 1632.

In 1634, Oxford University granted him a D.D. at the request of William Laud, without the formalities, a move criticized by John Prideaux. He was diplomated or actually created as such on 14 August 1636. In the 1630s, Skinner was known for his sermons before Charles I asserting Arminian doctrines. In 1636, he became bishop of Bristol and rector of Greens Norton, Northamptonshire. He retained the living of Launton, to which were soon added those of Cuddesdon, Oxfordshire, and Beckenham, Kent. In Bristol, he was active in preaching against Calvinism.

In 1641, he was translated to become Bishop of Oxford. He was one of the bishops who subscribed the protest of 17 December 1641, declaring themselves prevented from attendance in Parliament, and was consequently committed by the lords to the Tower, where he remained eighteen weeks. Released on bail, he resided at Launton. In 1643, he was deprived of Greens Norton "for his malignity against the parliament." He was deprived of his see by Parliament on 9 October 1646, as episcopacy was abolished for the duration of the Commonwealth and the Protectorate. He was also sequestered from his livings of Cuddesden in 1646 and Beckenham in 1647. During the Commonwealth, he secured a licence to preach, and continued in his diocese. He also conferred holy orders throughout England. It is stated by Thomas Warton, in his Life of R. Bathurst (p. 35), that Ralph Bathurst secretly examined the candidates, and officiated at Launton as archdeacon.

At the Stuart Restoration, he became one of the king's commissioners of the University of Oxford, and in 1663 was translated to Worcester. He died on 14 June 1670 and is buried in a chapel at the east end of the choir of Worcester Cathedral. At the head of the inscribed stone, which is now in the crypt, is the arms of the family impaled with those of the see. He married Elizabeth, eldest daughter of Bernard Bangor, esquire bedell of Oxford, and left six sons and four daughters.

Skinner's eldest son Matthew became a fellow of Trinity. The latter's grandson was Matthew Skinner, serjeant-at-law; while from the bishop's fourth son was descended John Skinner, the antiquary.

Church of England titles
Preceded by George Coke	Bishop of Bristol; 1637–1641	Succeeded by Thomas Westfield
Preceded by John Bancroft	Bishop of Oxford; 1641–1646 & 1660–1663	Succeeded by William Paul
Preceded by John Earle	Bishop of Worcester; 1663–1670	Succeeded by Walter Blandford
