= William Walmesley =

English Anglican priest (1687–1730)

William Walmesley, (5 April 1687, in Lichfield – 18 September 1730, in Packington) was Dean of Lichfield from 1720 until his death.

Walmesley was educated at Trinity College, Cambridge. He was Chaplain to Edward Villiers, 1st Earl of Jersey; and also held benefices at Mavesyn Ridware and Packington.

Church of England titles
Preceded by Jonathan Kimberley	Dean of Lichfield; 1720 –1730	Succeeded by Nicholas Penny
