= Griffin Higgs =

English churchman

Griffin or Griffith Higgs (1589–1659) was an English churchman, the dean of Lichfield from 1638.

== Life ==
Higgs was born at South Stoke, Oxfordshire, the second son of Griffith Higgs by Sarah, daughter of Robert Paine of Caversham in the same county. After attending Reading school he entered St John's College, Oxford, in 1606, and acquired a reputation both as an orator and disputant. He graduated B.A. on 26 June 1610.

In 1611 Higgs was elected probationer fellow of Merton College, and proceeding M.A. on 27 June 1615 (Wood, Fasti, &c., i. 362), had two small cures successively bestowed on him by the college. He served the office of senior proctor 1622–3 (ib. i. 404) 'with great courage, tho' of little stature.' He commenced B.D. on 1 April 1625 (ib. i. 423), and in 1627 went to the Hague as chaplain to Elizabeth Stuart, Queen of Bohemia, in which capacity he remained for twelve years. His preaching was greatly admired by the queen, who made him several presents, as he mentioned in his will. On 12 Feb. 1629–30 he took his doctor's degree at Leyden, and was incorporated at Oxford on the 27th of that month (ib. i. 452). with the support of Archbishop William Laud, he was appointated precentor of St David's on 21 May 1631 (Le Neve, Fasti, ed. Hardy, i. 316), instituted vicar of Cliffe, Kent, about 1636 (Hasted, Kent, iv. 32), and in 1638 made dean of Lichfield (Le Neve, i. 563), 'the cathedral of which,' says Wood, 'he adorned to his great charge.' He was also chaplain in ordinary to the king.

When the civil war broke out he lost all his preferments, and retired to South Stoke, but afterwards to Oxford, where he remained until its surrender. For this he was adjudged a delinquent and his estate sequestered. He only obtained a pardon by paying a fine of £480 on 21 Sept. 1647.

== Death and legacy ==
Higgs died unmarried at South Stoke on 16 December 1659 and was buried in the chancel of the church. According to his will dated 22 Aug 1659, he allotted funds to the church of South Stoke, some specified to buy land for the poor of that town. He also donated funds to purchase free land of socage for the maintenance of a schoolmaster there, which was to be managed by the warden and fellows of Merton College, who were appointed patrons of the school to be erected at South Stoke. He left funds for the purchase of divinity books for the Bodleian Library, St. Merton's and St. John's College. His library, which had been scattered during the war, the greatest portion being kept at Stafford, he left to Merton College but the corporation of Stafford successfully resisted the attempts of the college to obtain the books. Higgs likewise gave money to found a divinity lecture at Merton College and an annual sum to augment the allowance of the postmasters.

Upon his death, Higgs donated £1,500 to Merton College, stipulating that £10 was earmarked as librarian's annual stipend. He also left his entire personal library to Merton College and more than 650 titles remain there today. While it was not uncommon for an educated man of his position to donate a collection to a library, his endowment of a librarianship is unique. He left detailed instructions about the librarian's qualifications and responsibilities. A code of conduct was suggested for librarians at the college. He also provided guidelines for cataloging the collection, maintaining books and managing acquisitions. Although his wishes were largely ignored, his practical instructions are essential to understanding the concept of librarianship in the 17th century.

== Works ==
He wrote a life of Sir Thomas White, the founder of his college, in Latin verse, which was preserved in manuscript in the college library. Bound up with it is another manuscript by Higgs, entitled 'A True and Faithfull Relation of the Risinge and Fall of Thomas Tucker, Prince of Alba Fortunata, Lord of St. John's, with all the Occurrents which happened throughout his whole Domination,' an account of the mock ceremonie on choosing a lord of misrule at Christmas. Of this narration 250 copies were printed in 1816 by Philip Bliss, under the title 'An account of the Christmas prince: as it was exhibited in the University of Oxford in 1607,' London. Appended are several extracts from the dramas acted on the occasion.

His other writings are:

1. Problemata Theologica, Leyden, 1630.

2. Miscellaneæ Theses Theologicæ, defended by him when he was made D.D., Leyden, 1630.

He left other works in manuscript. He has verses in Ultima Linea Savilii, 1622.

The Griffith Higgs of South Stoke whose epitaph is printed in 'Notes and Queries,' 1st ser. vol. x. p. 266, was Higgs's nephew. He died in 1693, not 1698.
