= William de Manecestra =

Dean of Lichfield

John de Derby was the inaugural Dean of Lichfield, serving from 1222 until 1254.
