= William Paul (bishop) =

English royal chaplain and bishop of Oxford

William Paul (bapt. 14 October 1599 – 24 August 1665) was an English royal chaplain and bishop of Oxford.

== Life ==
He was baptised at St. Leonard's, Eastcheap, on 14 October 1599, a younger son (one of sixteen children) of William Paul, a butcher of Eastcheap, London. He went to Oxford in 1614, and matriculated 15 November 1616 at All Souls' College. He became a fellow of All Souls' in 1618, graduated B.A. 9 June 1618, M.A. 1 June 1621, B.D. 13 March 1629, and D.D. 10 March 1632.

After taking holy orders he was a frequent preacher in Oxford and was rector of a mediety of Patshall, Staffordshire, from 7 February 1626 till 1628. In 1632 or 1633 he became rector of Baldwin-Brightwell, Oxfordshire, and about that time was also made chaplain to Charles I of England, and canon-residentiary of Chichester, holding the prebend of Seaford. After the outbreak of the First English Civil War the House of Lords resolved (5 October 1642) that he should be allowed to attend the king as chaplain in ordinary.

When the war ended he lost his prebend of Chichester as a delinquent, but he was discharged by the committee for sequestrations; under the Commonwealth he lent out money. After the Restoration he again became royal chaplain, and recovered his Seaford prebend and his Oxford livings. He became vicar of Amport, Hampshire, in 1662. He was Dean of Lichfield from 26 January 1661, and took part in the election of John Hacket as bishop.

In 1663 he became bishop of Oxford. Gilbert Sheldon and the king expected that Paul would devote his wealth to rebuilding the bishop's palace at Cuddesden, but nothing was done before he died at Chinnor on 24 August 1665. He was buried at Baldwin-Brightwell, where a monument, with a long inscription, was erected.

== Family ==
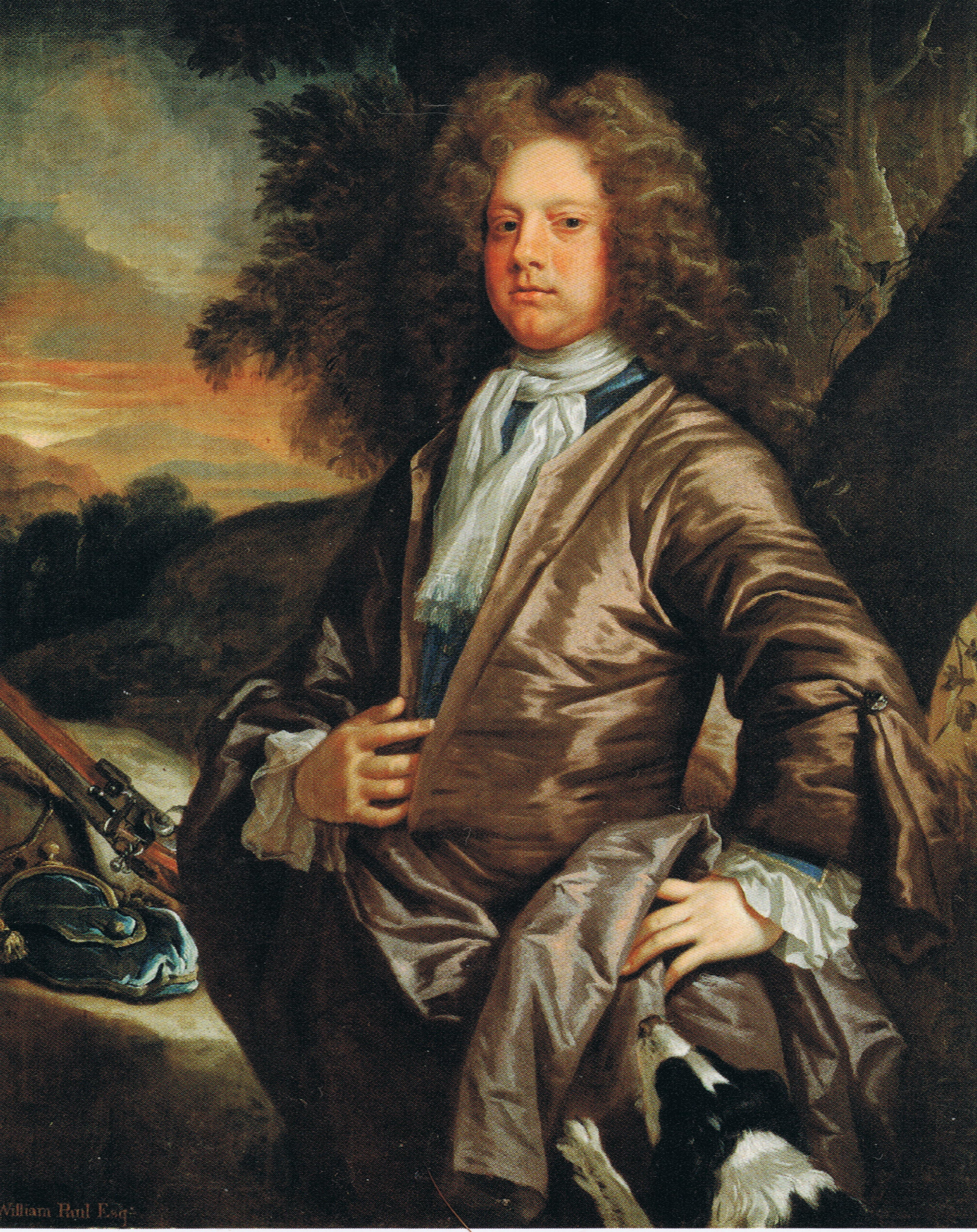
William Paul's only surviving grandson, William Paul, esquire, of Bray (1673–1711), by John Closterman.

Paul married, in 1632, Mary, daughter of Sir Henry Glemham, and sister of Anne Glemham who married Dudley Carleton, 1st Viscount Dorchester. The marriage led to a suit between Paul and Anne, Viscountess of Dorchester, about a marriage settlement for Mary. The difference was referred to the archbishop of Canterbury and the lord keeper, and they found the Viscountess was willing to pay £250.

Paul's first wife died in 1633, and on 22 January 1635 he married, at St. Giles-in-the-fields, Alice, second daughter of Thomas Cutler of Ipswich. She died soon after, 19 November 1635, and was buried in Westminster Abbey on 20 November. After being widowed a second time, Paul almost immediately (in late 1635 or early 1636) married a third wife, Rachel, daughter of Sir Christopher Clitherow, by whom he had a numerous family. Sir William Stapleton, 4th Baronet married the heiress of Paul's only surviving grandson.

== Seneca Valley ==
A gymnasium at Seneca Valley Senior High School in Harmony, PA is named after William Paul after his direct blood relative, John C. Paul, who became a bishop in the Pittsburgh diocese in 1984, blessed the gymnasium as a sign of friendship towards the Seneca Indians to make up for the bad relations between the Pauls' British ancestors during the French in Indian War, where General Paul ordered the colonists to give the Seneca Indians blankets infected with smallpox. There is no mention of this connection between the bishop and general Paul in the DNB.

== Notes ==
Church of England titles
Preceded by Robert Skinner	Bishop of Oxford; 1663–1665	Succeeded by Walter Blandford
