= Lunt Roman Fort =

British archaeological site

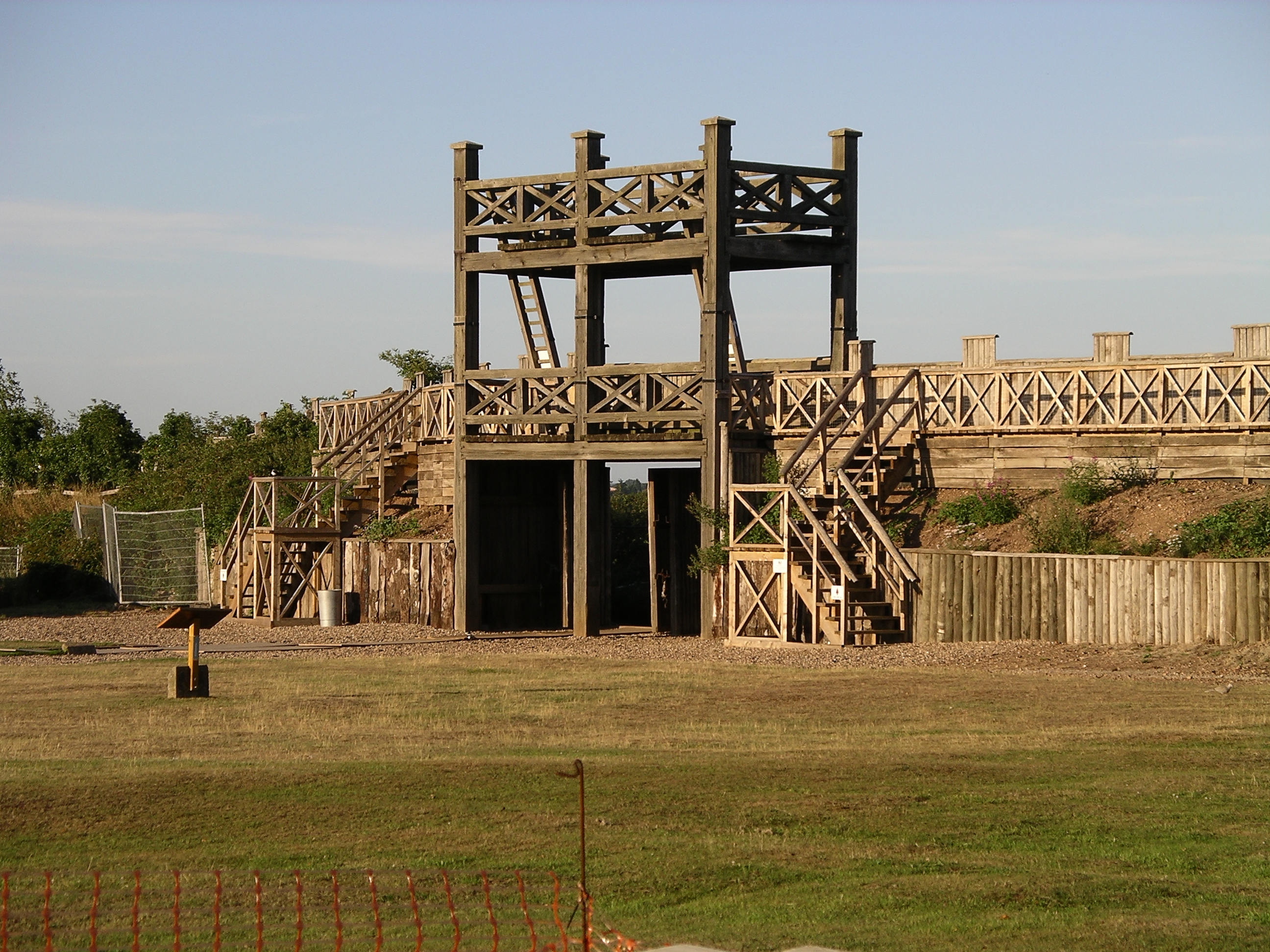
- The reconstructed main gatehouse as seen from inside the fort
- Interactive map of Lunt Roman Fort
- 52.37272°N 1.496571°W
- Type: Roman fort (archaeological site)
- Location: Baginton, Warwickshire, England
- OS grid reference: SP 34415 75158

History
- Built: c. AD 60
- Original use: Supply depot and headquarters for an unknown Roman legion
- Rebuilt: 1970s (partial reconstruction)

Site notes
- Architectural style: Military engineering of ancient Rome
- Current use: Museum
- Governing body: Herbert Art Gallery and Museum
- Website: www.luntromanfort.org

Scheduled monument
- Official name: Roman fort at The Lunt
- Designated: 14 June 1962
- Reference no.: Historic England – National Heritage List for England (1017245)

The Lunt Roman fort is the archaeological site of a Roman fort, of unknown name, in the Roman province of Britannia. It is open to the public and located in the village of Baginton, Warwickshire, 5 km southeast of central Coventry. The fort has now been fully excavated and partially reconstructed; the wooden gateway rebuild was led by archaeologist Margaret Rylatt, using the same tools and techniques that the military engineers of the Roman Army would have used. In 2001, Anglo Saxon artefacts dating to Sub-Roman Britain were discovered on the site.

The site has a large steep wooded bank, known as The Lunt, just beyond the northern boundary of the fort, which descends to the River Sowe. The elevation from the top of the bank provides good views of the landscape to the north for two or three miles (about 4.0 km).

== Etymology ==
The original Roman name for the fort is unknown. The modern name refers to "The Lunt", the local name for the steep wooded escarpment descending to the River Sowe from the plateau on which the fort sits. The name "Lunt" is derived from the Old Norse word lundr, which means a "grove" or "copse".

== History ==
Four periods of occupation of the fort during periods of unrest in Roman Britain have been identified by excavation. The fort was built around AD 60 to act as a supply depot and headquarters for an unknown legion during the final campaign against Boudica.

From AD 64 it was used, in the second phase, by a cohort which reduced the size of the fort, but from which the principia, praetorium, two granaries and six barrack blocks have been excavated. A number of buildings were demolished to construct a gyrus. Many horse fittings, possible stabling, an extensive metalworking area, granary and storage space suggests a cavalry unit was present at this time. This second phase lasted until AD 77/8.

The third period of AD 77/78-79 included construction of a double ditch system, a twin-portalled gateway on the south and occupation outside the defences until the fort was decommissioned.

After AD 260, perhaps during the rebel Gallic Empire, it was recommissioned as a temporary fort with ditches on a similar alignment but slightly larger than that of Period 2. This is based on the discovery of a single coin found in the post hole of a gateway at the site of the fort that dates to the reign of Gallienus (r. 260–268), but the coin could have been a casual loss long after the fort had been abandoned.

=== Gyrus ===
The north, south and west sides followed the usual pattern for a Roman camp of straight ditches and ramparts. However, on the eastern side the defences bulge out around a circular structure with a diameter of 32 m (105 ft), enclosing an area of 1,024 m^{2} (1,225 yd^{2}). The sand and gravel subsoil had been dug out to a depth of 600 to 900 mm (24 to 35 in) and the area surrounded with a timber stockade.

This ring, the only known "gyrus" in the Roman Empire, may have been used for training horses, possibly by means of lungeing (training the horse in a circular training ground on the end of a long rein). The same training methods were used in by the United States Cavalry at the similarly circular 'Bullring' in Jefferson Barracks Military Post in the 19th century.

The gyrus was added to the fort during its second period of occupation and its construction caused significant disruption to the fort. Having the gyrus within the fort affects not just the wall which curves to accommodate the structure deviating from the Roman playing card shape pattern but also the layout of the fort which is significantly different from the standard layout. This makes the fort unique not just in Britain but also in the Roman Empire.

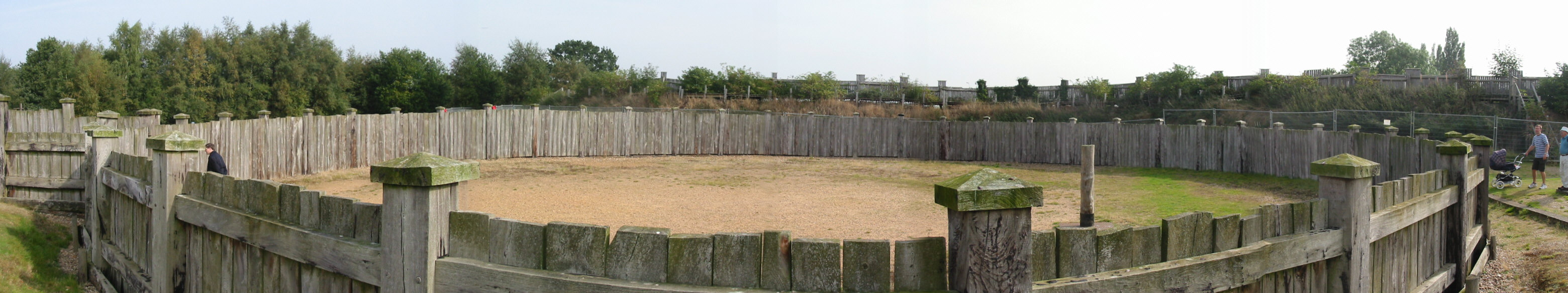
The gyrus is believed to have been used for training horses

== Archaeology and preservation ==
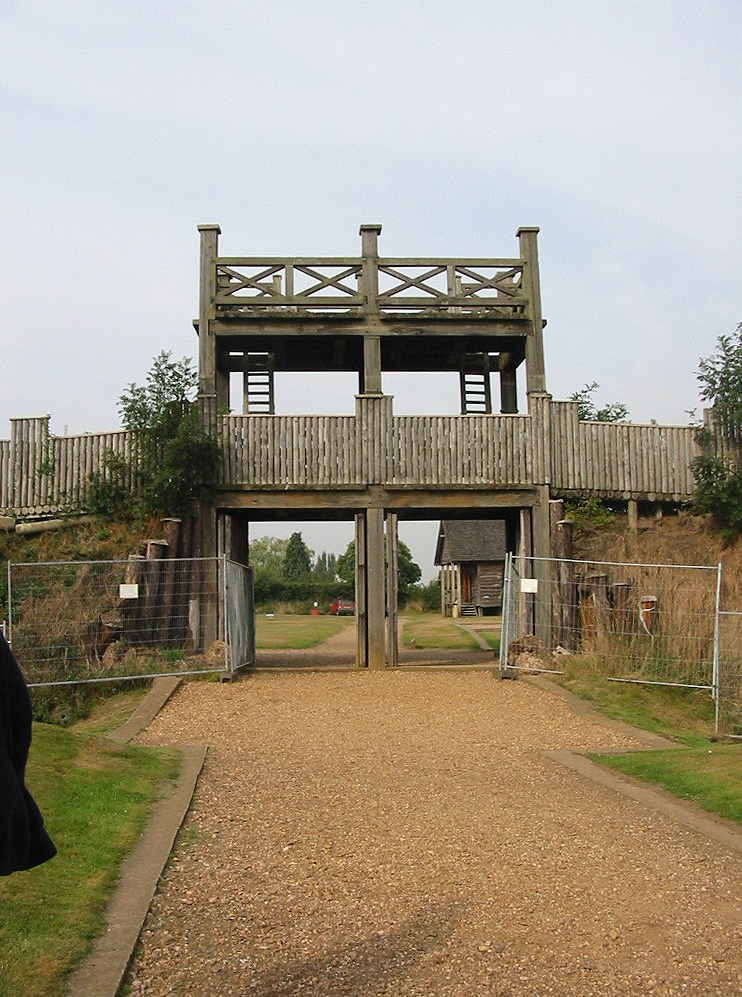
Reconstruction of the main gate to the fort

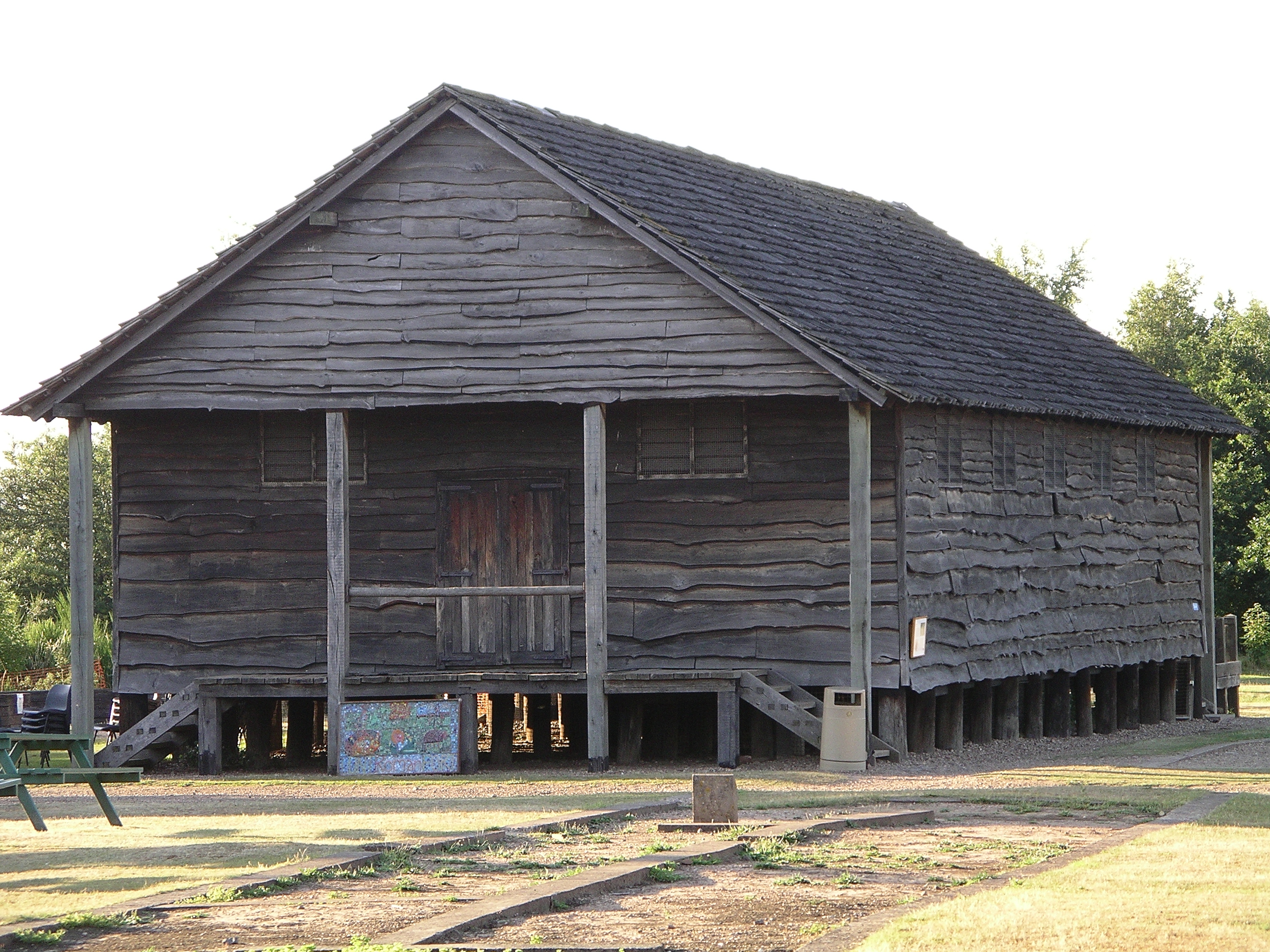
The modern interpretation of the fort's granary

The site was identified when large quantities of Roman pottery were found in the 1930s. In the 1960s, Brian Hobley, keeper of field archaeology at the Coventry Museum, commenced a long-term project to combine excavation with a study of the methods by which Roman camps were built. Archaeological excavations identified three distinct periods of occupation of the Roman military site. During the 1970s some features of the fort were reconstructed upon the original foundations: these are a section of the wall, a gateway modelled on images of Trajan's Column, one of the three granaries and the gyrus.

In 2001 a team of Canadian students unearthed a fragment of Roman Samian pottery and a Nero's head coin dating from 65 AD. Other finds have included a ring etched with a palm leaf. This type of design symbolized victory and was worn by successful gladiators.

Evidence of Saxon settlement was unearthed in 2001 and finds evidencing mediaeval occupation include large post holes and a post-Roman ditch filled with pottery fragments.

The fort is open for public, school visits and organised tours and has hosted many holiday excavation trips.
