= William MacPherson (priest) =

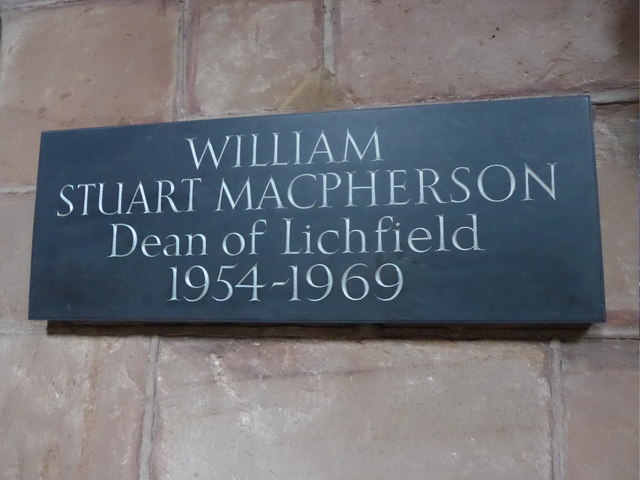
Memorial in Lichfield Cathedral

William Stuart MacPherson (30 September 1901 – 7 July 1978) was an eminent Anglican priest in the second half of the 20th century.

He was born in Leeds, Yorkshire, the fourth of five sons of Henry MacPherson, an electrical engineer, and Lilly Hallewell MacPherson. He also had a younger sister, Eileen. His brother Alfred Sinclair MacPherson married writer Margaret Kendall while his brother Henry Douglas MacPherson was killed in the First World War. He was educated at Sedbergh and Pembroke College, Cambridge. Ordained in 1932 he began his career with a curacy at Richmond, Yorkshire after which he was a Minor Canon at Ripon Cathedral. When World War II came he was a chaplain in the RNVR. Later he was Rector then Archdeacon of Richmond. In 1954, he was appointed Dean of Lichfield, a post he held for 15 years.

He died in Honiton, Devon, aged 76.

Church of England titles
Preceded by Frederic Athelwold Iremonger	Dean of Lichfield; 1954–1969	Succeeded by George Edward Holderness
