= Walter Blandford =

Bishop and academic administrator

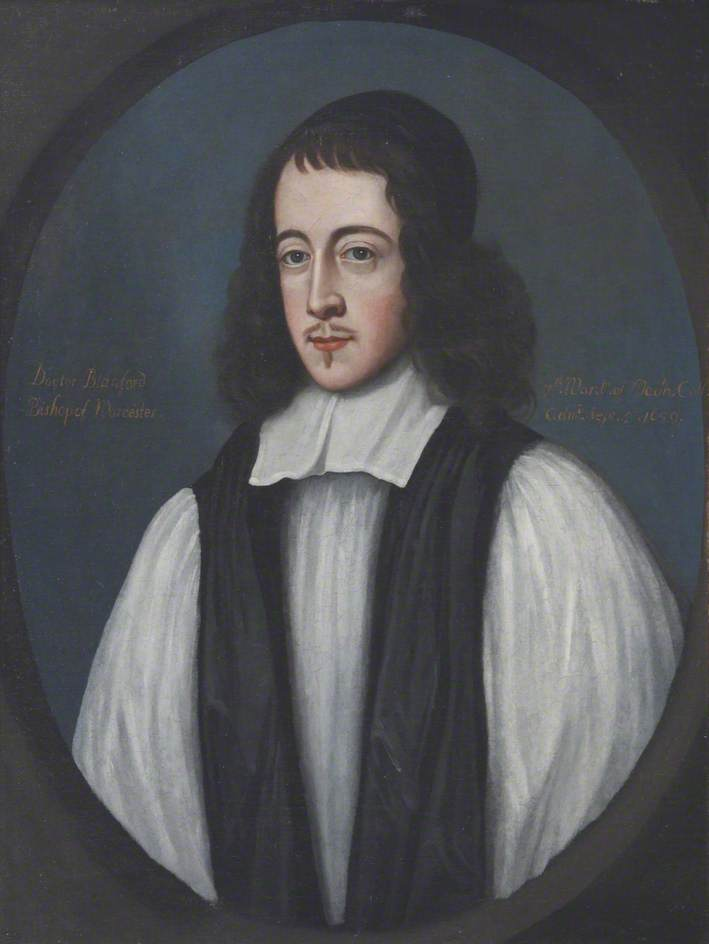
Bishop Walter Blandford

Walter Blandford (1616 in Melbury Abbas, Dorset, England – 1675) was an English academic and bishop.

== Life ==
A Fellow of Wadham College, Oxford at the time of the Parliamentary visitation of 1648, he compromised sufficiently to retain his position, and was appointed chaplain to John Lovelace, 2nd Baron Lovelace. Later, he succeeded John Wilkins as Warden of Wadham College from 1659 to 1665. He was Vice-Chancellor of the University of Oxford in 1662, and succeeded in establishing a degree of calm after the turbulence that had accompanied the Restoration of 1660.

He became Bishop of Oxford in November 1665 (his appointment being the first announcement in the first edition of the Oxford Gazette, later the London Gazette), and Bishop of Worcester in 1671. He was also appointed Clerk of the Closet in 1668 (until 1669) and Dean of the Chapel Royal in 1669, serving until 1675.

He also had a distinguished series of positions as chaplain, first with John Lord Lovelace. He served as chaplain to Sir Edward Hyde, later the Earl of Clarendon and a highly influential statesman. He was also one of the bishops brought into the household of Hyde's daughter, Anne, Duchess of York. Following George Morley in this position, Blandford had no more success than others in heading off the Duchess's ultimate conversion to Catholicism.

Academic offices
Preceded by John Wilkins	Warden of Wadham College, Oxford; 1659–1665	Succeeded by Gilbert Ironside
Preceded by Richard Baylie	Vice-Chancellor of the University of Oxford; 1662–1664	Succeeded by Robert Say
Church of England titles
Preceded by William Paul	Bishop of Oxford; 1665–1671	Succeeded by Nathaniel Crew
Preceded by Robert Skinner	Bishop of Worcester; 1671–1675	Succeeded by James Fleetwood
