= Baginton =

Village in Warwickshire, England

Coordinates: 52.370°N 1.49°W

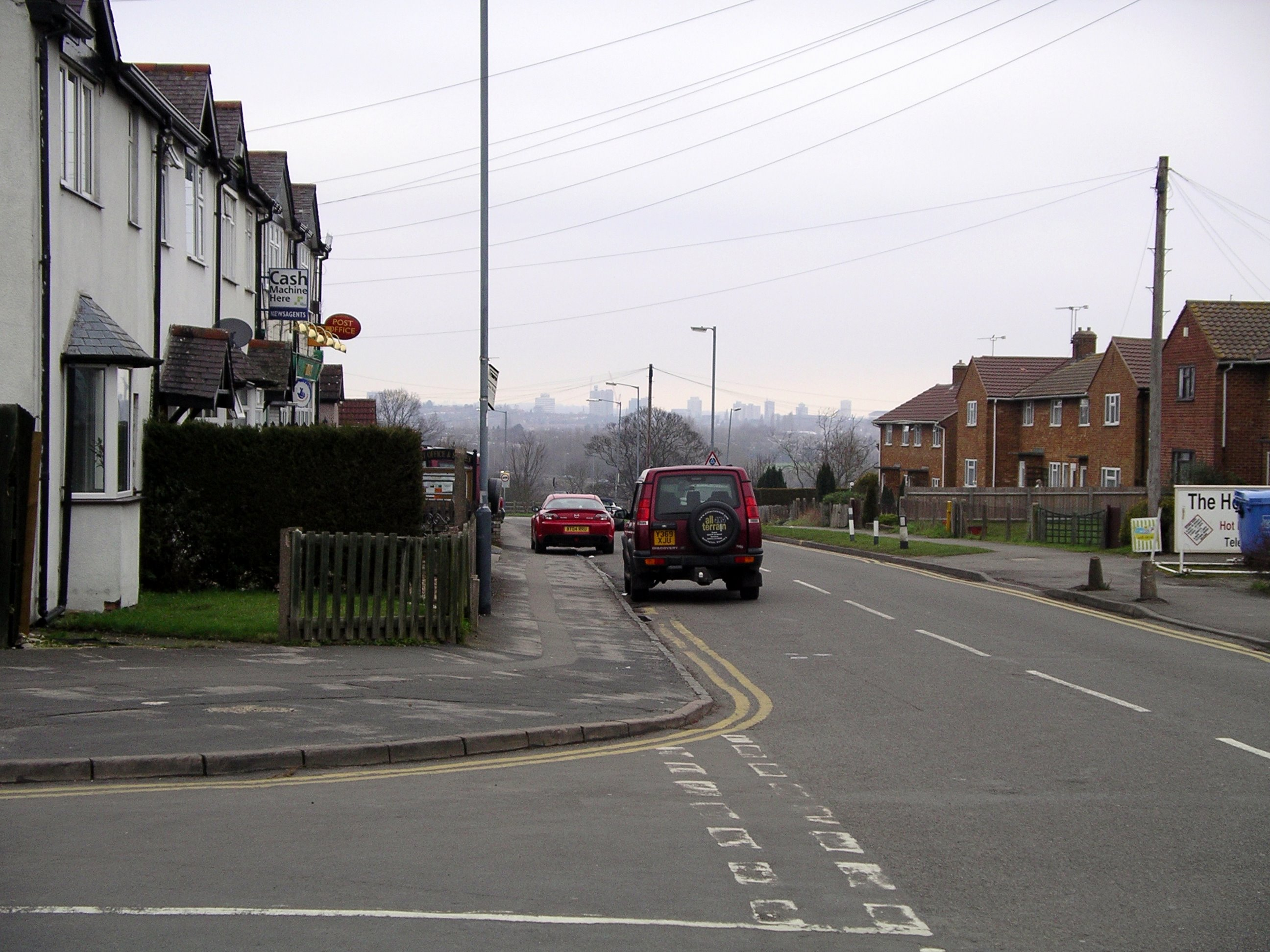
- View along Coventry Road, Baginton, with the Coventry city centre skyline about 4 miles away in the distance.

- Location within Warwickshire
- Population: 741 (2021)
- OS grid reference: SP3474
- Civil parish: Baginton
- District: Warwick
- Shire county: Warwickshire
- Region: West Midlands
- Country: England
- Sovereign state: United Kingdom
- Post town: KENILWORTH
- Postcode district: CV8
- Dialling code: 024
- UK Parliament: Kenilworth and Southam

Baginton is a village and civil parish in the Warwick district of Warwickshire, England, and has a common border with the City of Coventry / West Midlands county. With a population of 741 (2021 census), Baginton village is 4 miles (6.4 km) south of central Coventry, 4.5 miles (7.2 km) northeast of Kenilworth (its post town) and 7 miles (11 km) north of Leamington Spa. The population had reduced slightly to 755 at the 2011 census. The Lucy Price playing field is situated centrally in the village.

== Geography and administration ==
Coventry Airport (built 1936), the Lunt Roman Fort and the ancient "Baginton oak" tree are within the village, whilst the Midland Air Museum is just outside Baginton. The road from Baginton to southern Coventry (the city's Finham district) passes over the River Sowe near an old mill, which now is inhabited by a restaurant and hotel called The Old Mill. Baginton is often misspelt / mispronounced as 'Bagington'. The village is not quite contiguous with Coventry, separated by the three-lane A46 national route and a thin tract of countryside adjacent to the Sowe river.

== History ==
Baginton was populated since at least the Iron Age, and the Domesday Book of 1086 records that in the 11th century, Baginton consisted of 15 households and a mill. Baginton Castle was built around 1397 on the site of a house built during the 6th century, and 15th-16th century earthworks from the former village also survive.

== Archaeology ==
In December 2019, Roman and Anglo-Saxon artifacts, including pottery, jugs, and jewelry, were unearthed from burial grounds by archaeologists led by Nigel Page. The team of researchers believed that two of the graves belonged to a "high-status" rank officer and a Roman girl aged 6–12 years old. Findings from the Roman cremation burial site of a young girl included four brooches, a ring with an image of a cicada and a hair pin.

== Coventry Airport ==
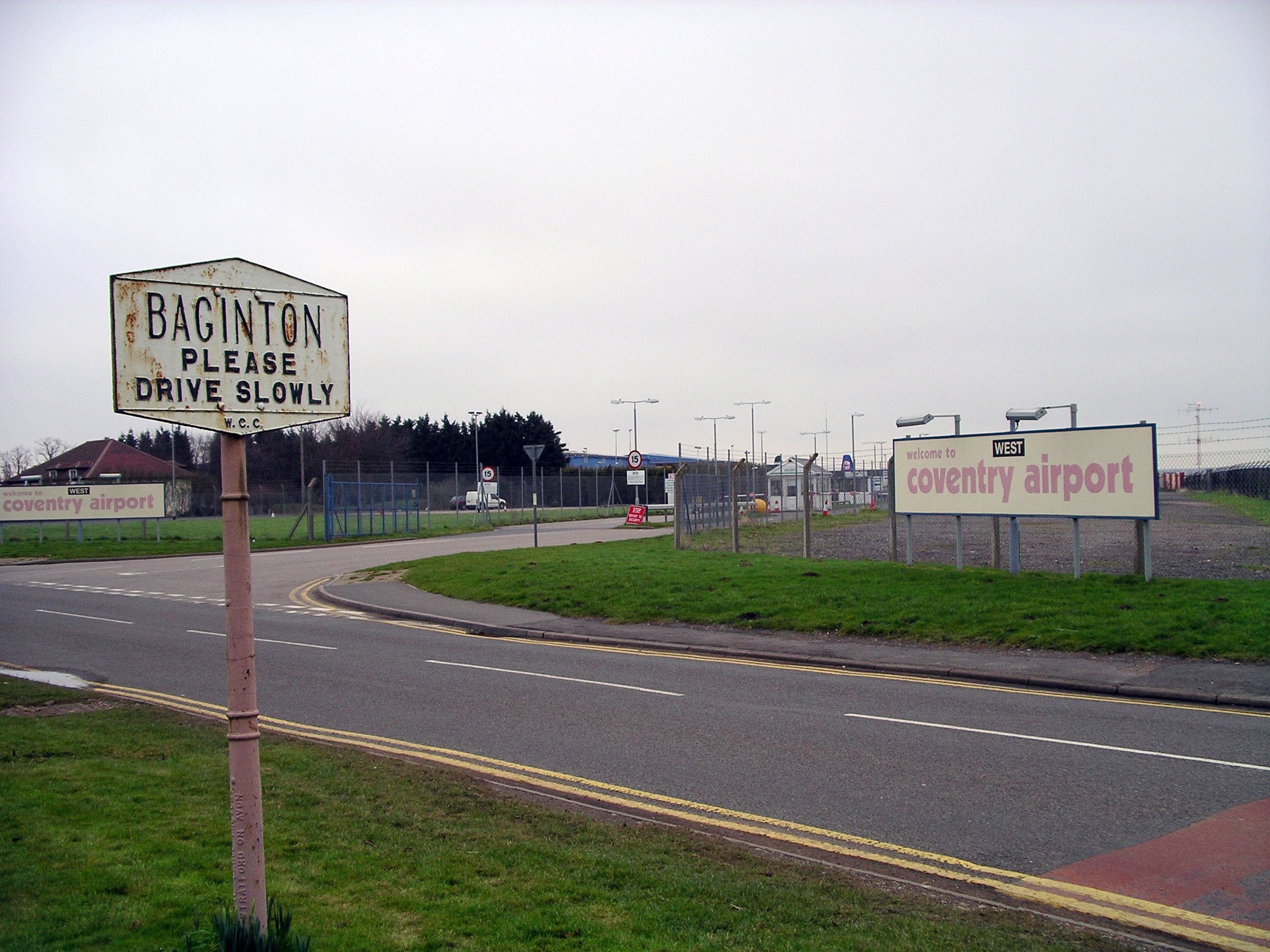
Coventry Airport gates, Baginton

Baginton is the site of the former Coventry Airport, which lay just southeast of the village. First opened in 1936 as Baginton Aerodrome, it had been used for general aviation, flight training and commercial freight and passenger flights. It had a grass surface for aeroplanes to land and take off. With the Second World War it became a fighter airfield. By October 1941, No. 308 Polish Fighter Squadron was located at Baginton. Flight operations ended on 9 May 2026, with final closure on 11 June 2026. The site is anticipated to be redeveloped as a battery gigafactory. The Midland Air Museum on Rowley Road is adjacent to the northern boundary of Coventry Airport.

== Landmarks ==
The remains of the Lunt Roman fort have been found in Baginton on the north side of the village near The Lunt (the wooded slope from the plateau going down to the River Sowe). Parts of the fort were reconstructed in the 1970s, and it has become a popular site for school visits, as well as holding activity days during the summer.

The Church of St John the Baptist is situated in the old part of Baginton. A scenic footpath starts near the church and leads to Stoneleigh. Baginton is the site of an old oak tree which is often called the Baginton oak. It is about 300–350 years old and is thought to be one of the oldest trees in Warwickshire. A nearby public house is called The Oak.

Henry Percy was imprisoned at Baginton Castle following his son Harry Hotspur's defeat at the Battle of Shrewsbury. The ruin that can be seen is of a late fourteenth-century house, but it is not well known due to its location in an area of woodland on private land. If Baginton Castle did exist here before this house, there is no sign of its ruins. Baginton Castle and Fish Ponds constitute a Scheduled Monument. The vestiges of the castle are a Grade II listed building. The site was opened to the public in 2009.

== Gallery ==
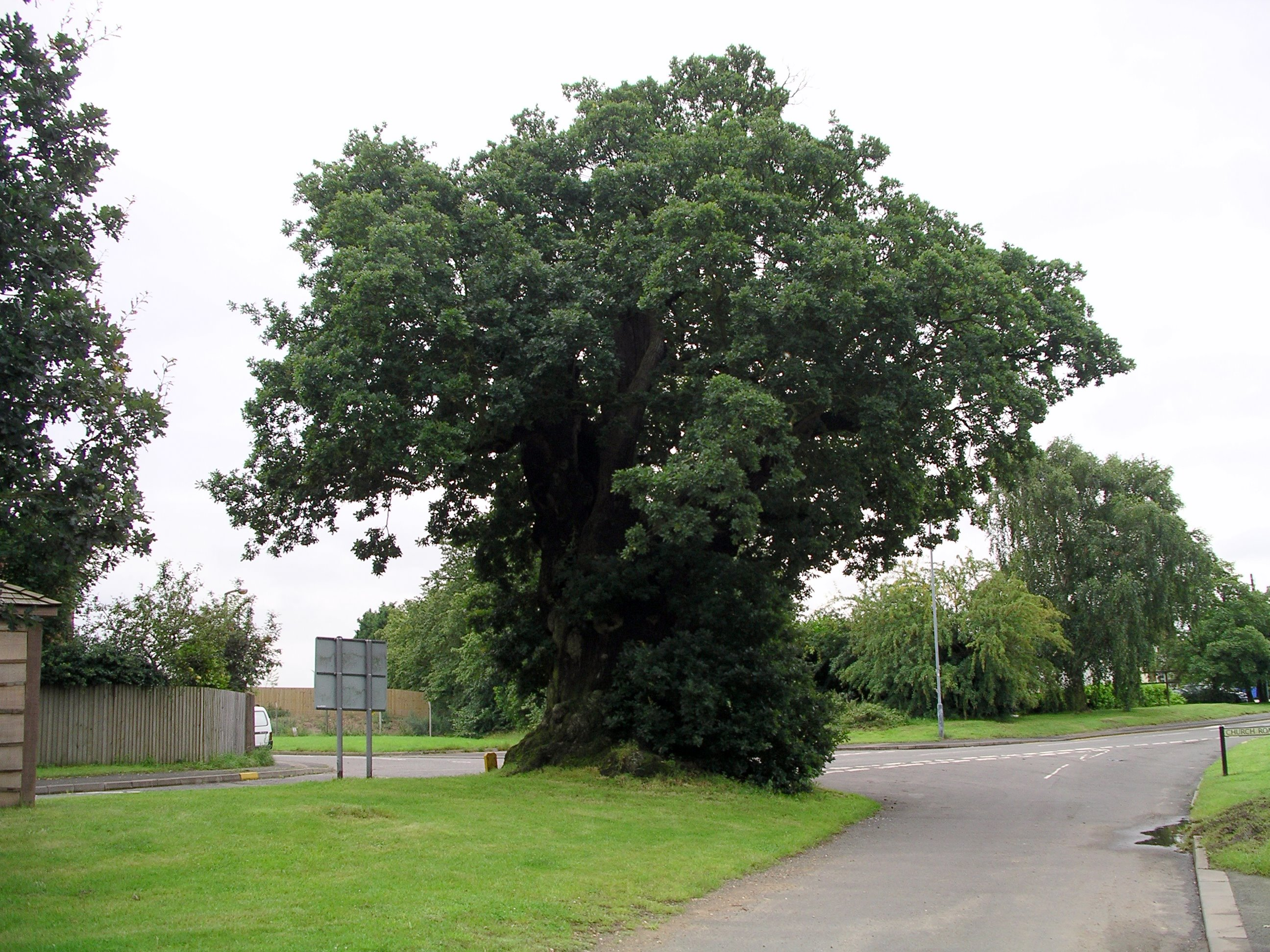
The Baginton oak in summer

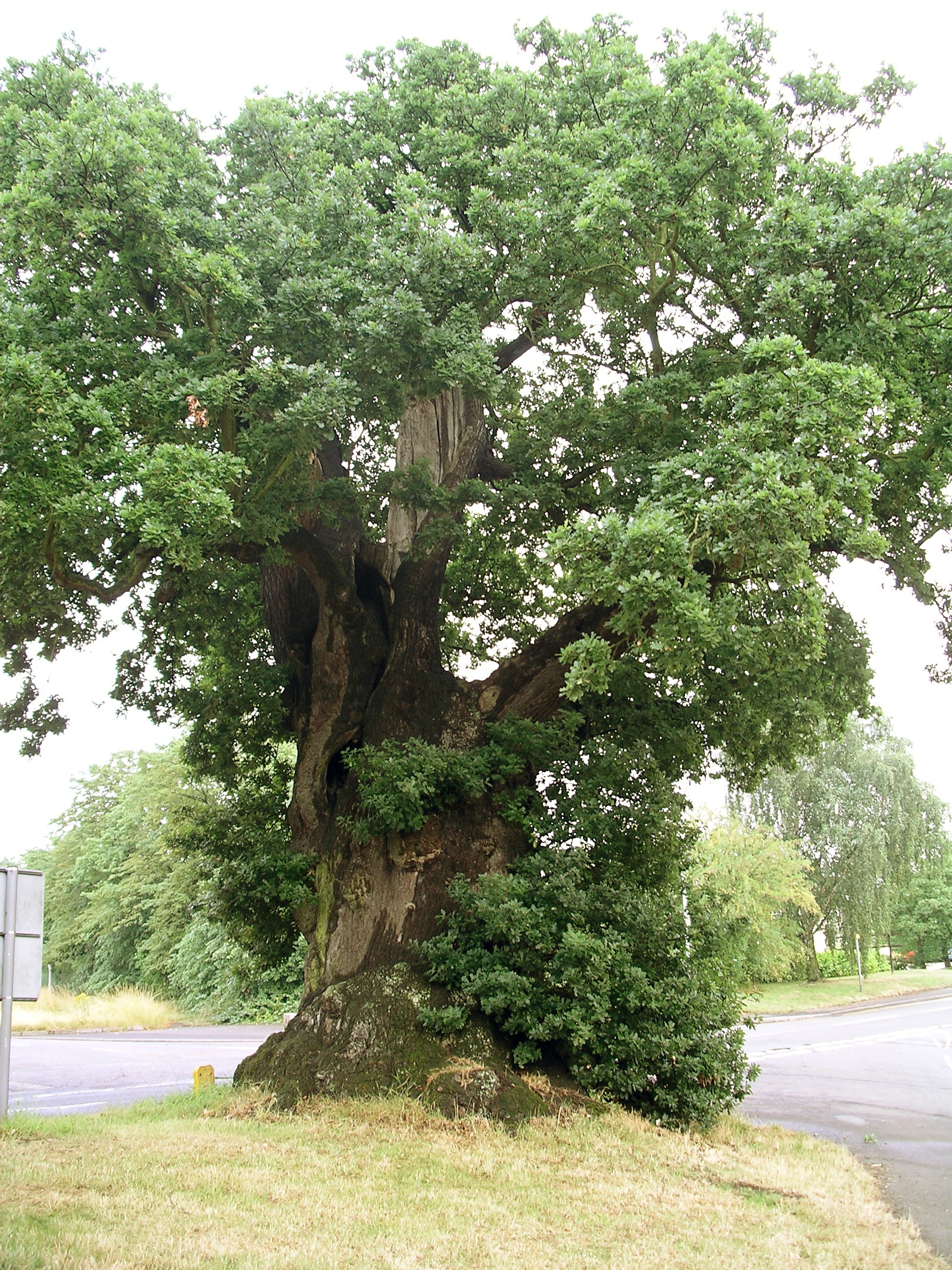
The Baginton oak in summer

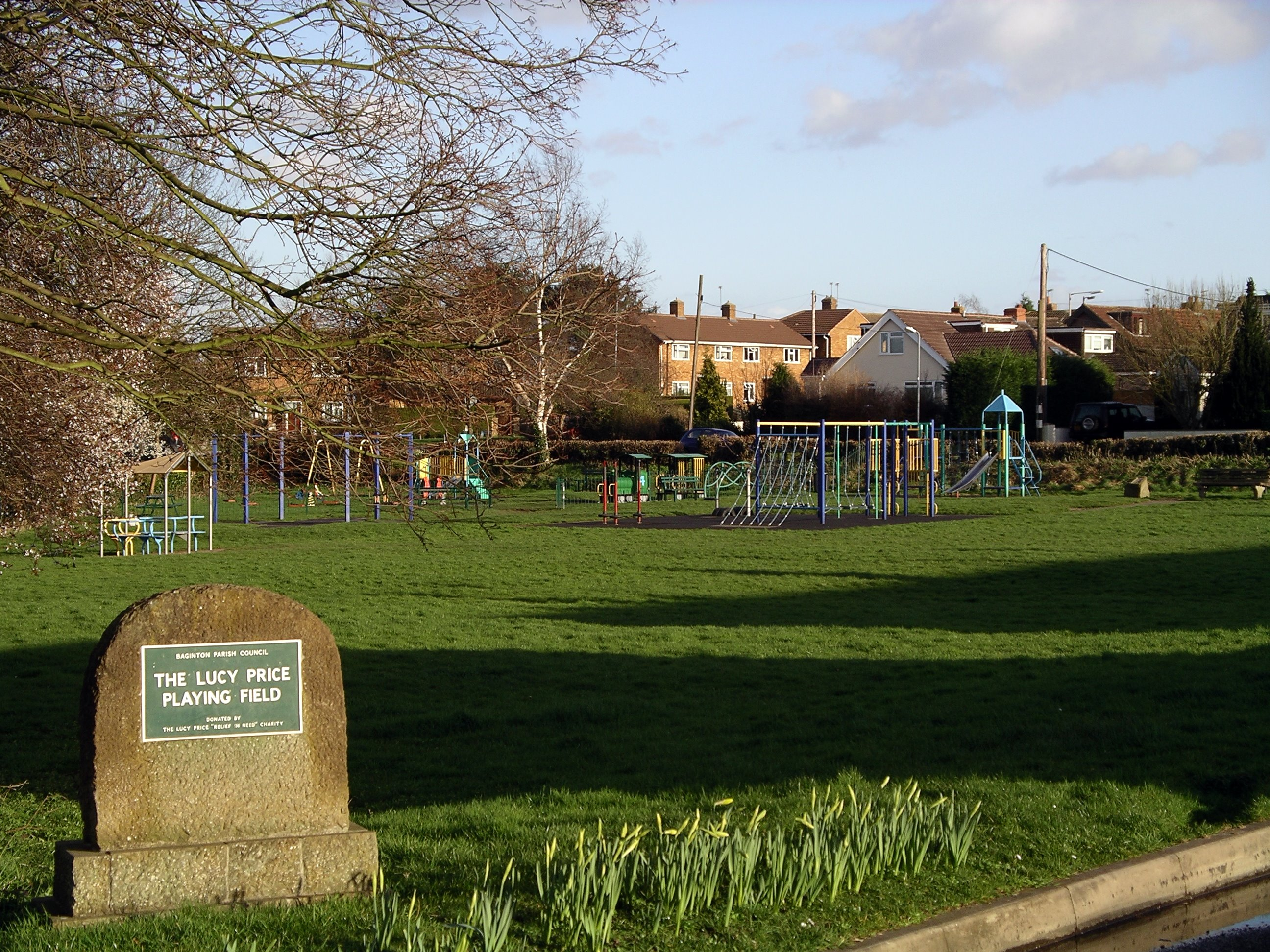
The Lucy Price playing field

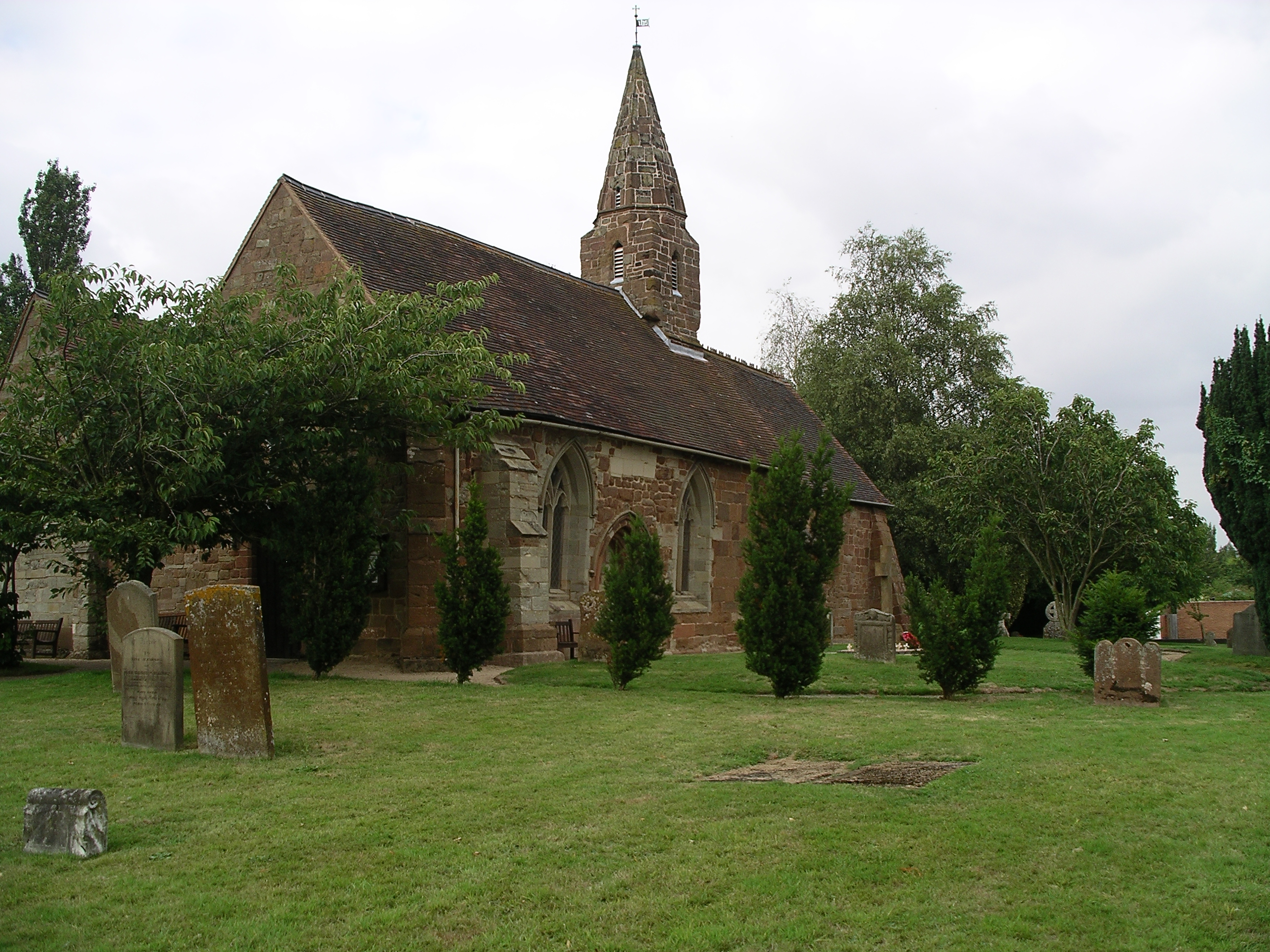
St John the Baptist Church, Baginton

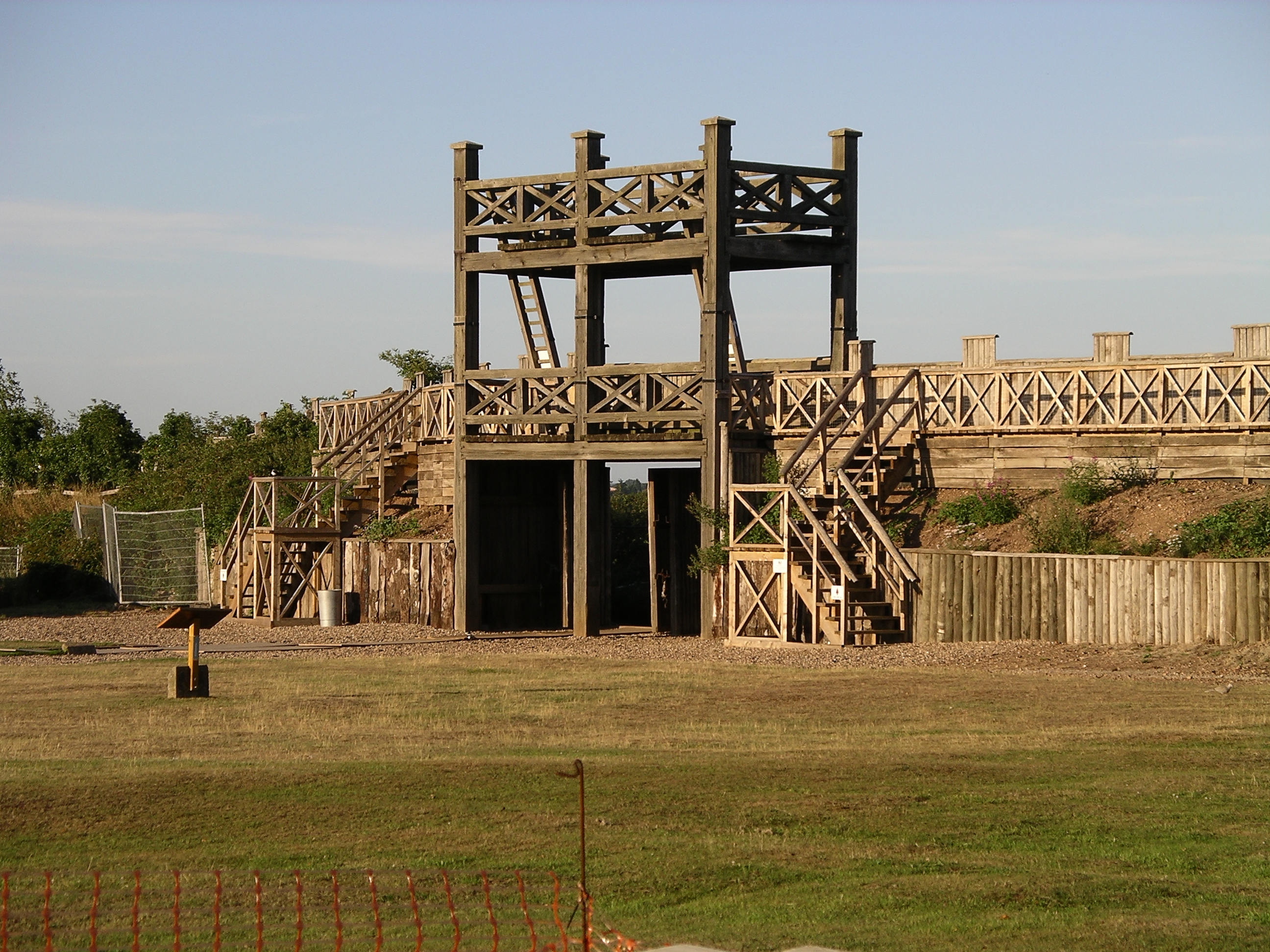
Reconstructed main gate (inner aspect) of Lunt Fort

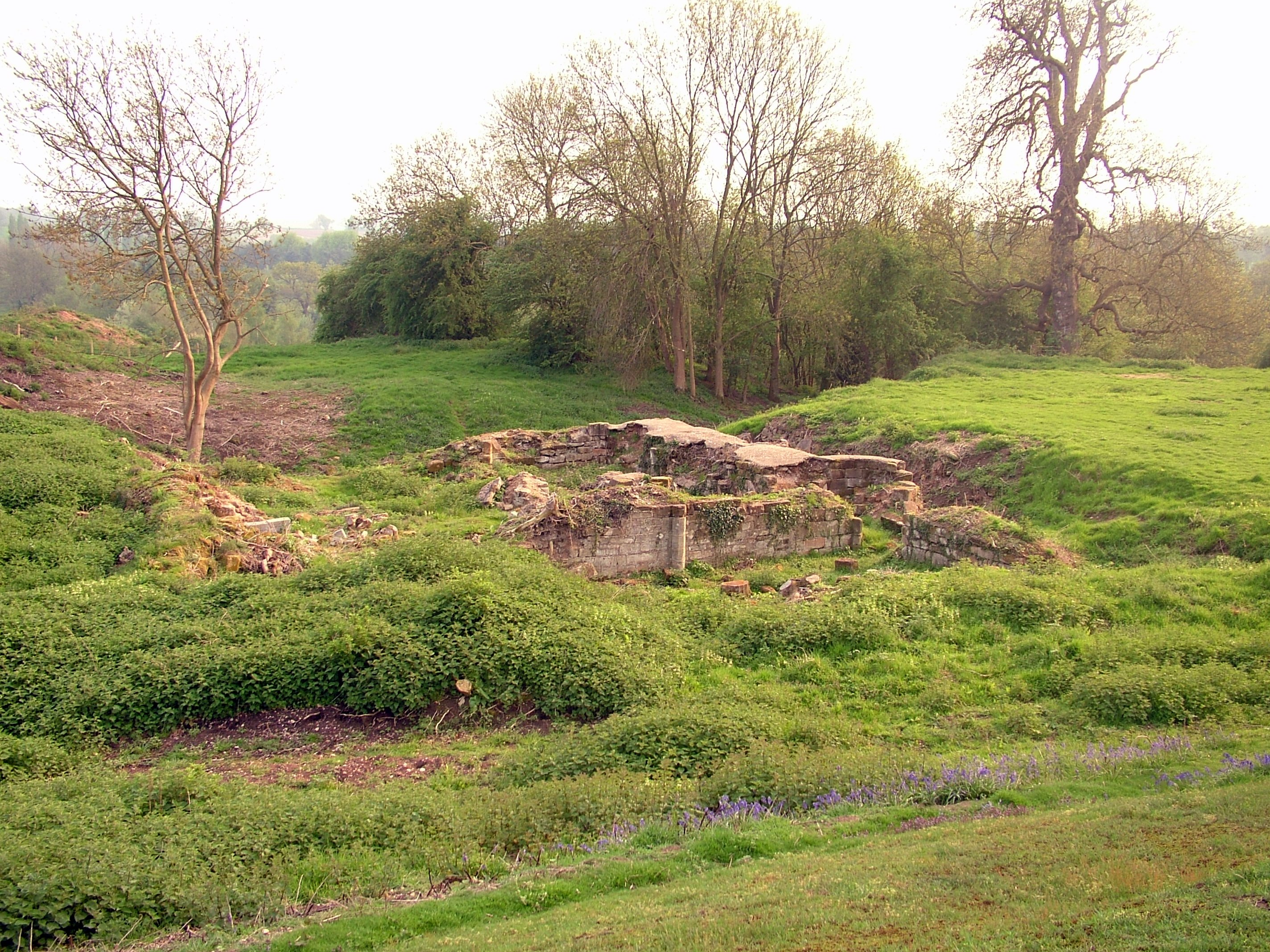
The ruins of a fourteenth-century house, possibly also the site of the former Baginton Castle

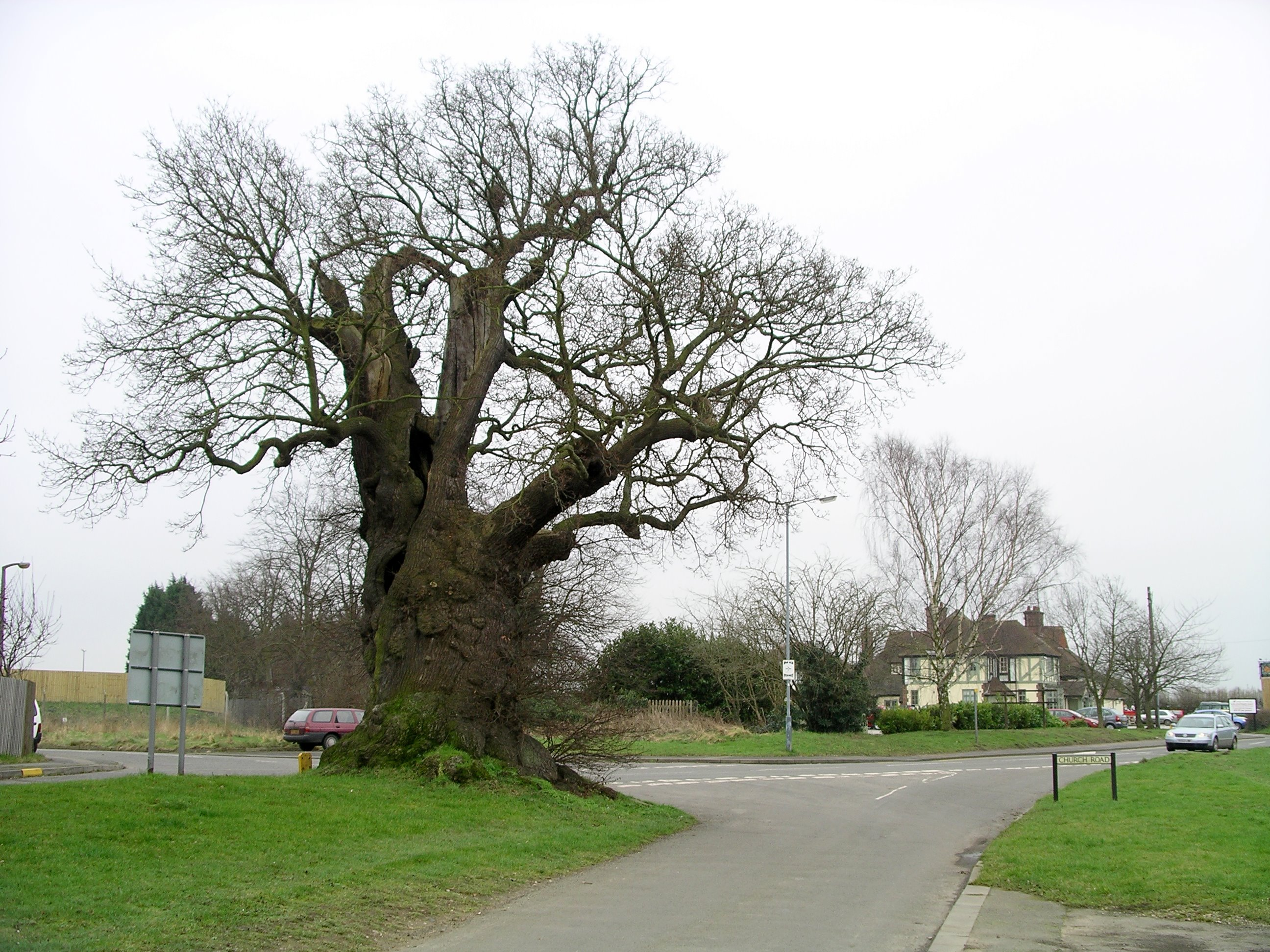
Baginton Oak tree, with The Oak public house in the background

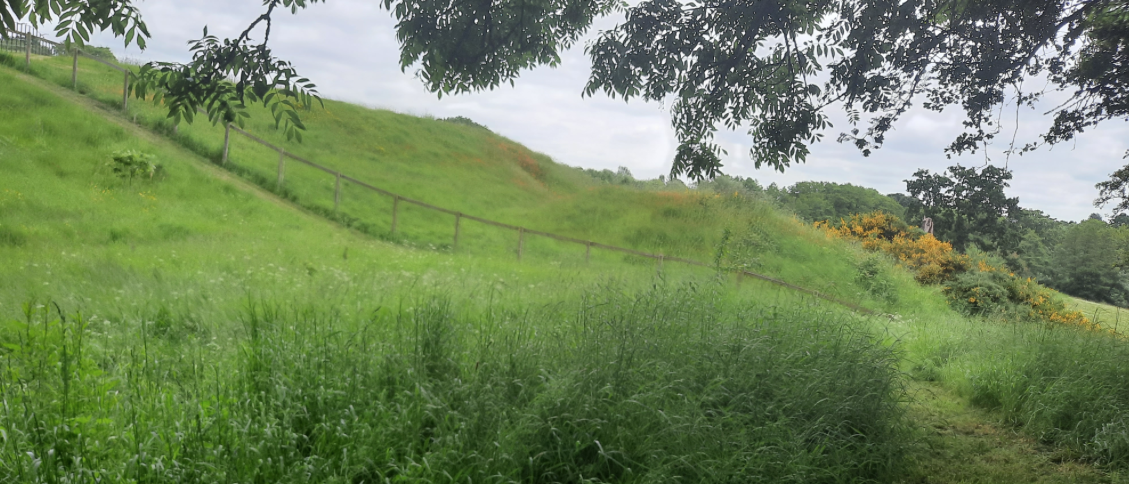
Earthworks of the Medieval village at Baginton, c. 15th-16th century

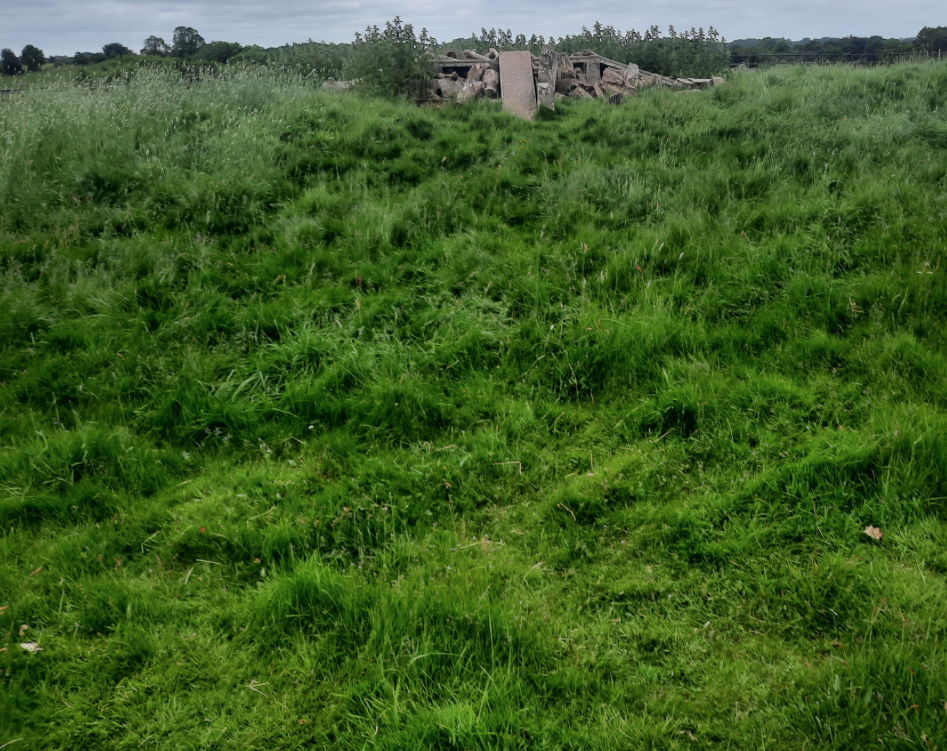
Earthworks of a 6th-century house at Baginton

== Sources ==
- Domesday Book
- Dugdale, Sir W. 1730 The Antiquities of Warwickshire, 2nd Ed. (ed. W. Thomas), London
- Edwards, J.H. 1953 'Baginton Castle Excavations', Trans. Birm. Warwicks. Arch. Soc., 69 (1951), 44–49.
- Smith, W. 1829 A New and Complete History of the County of Warwick, Birmingham
