= John Hacket =

English churchman

The Right Reverend John Hacket
- Bishop of Lichfield and Coventry
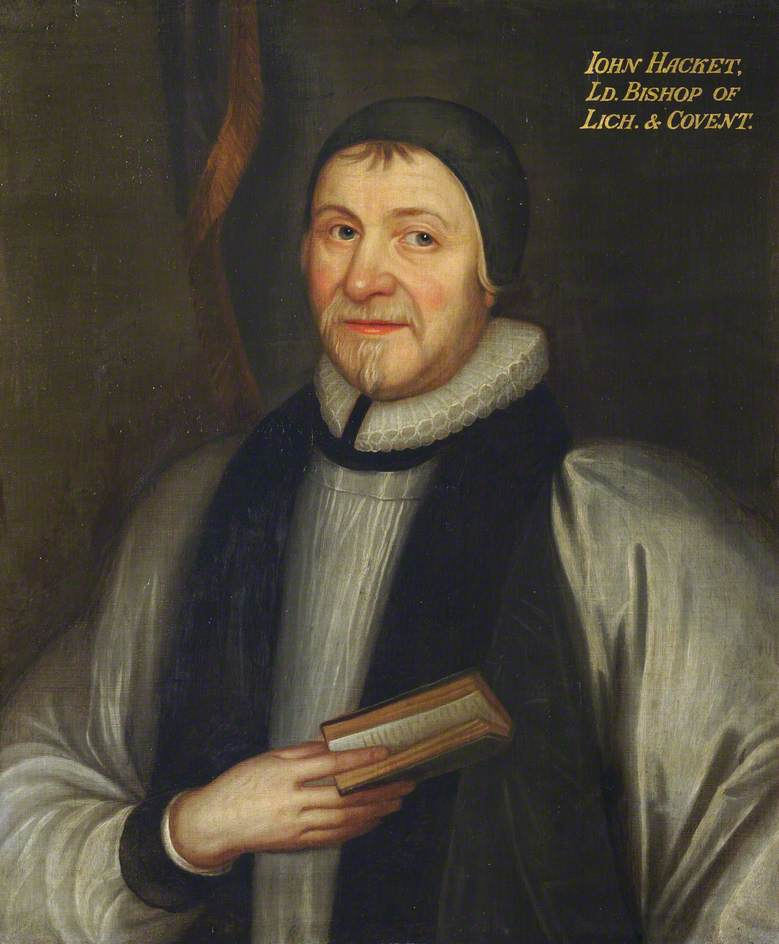
- Diocese: Lichfield and Coventry
- In office: 1661–1670
- Predecessor: Accepted Frewen
- Successor: Thomas Wood

Orders
- Consecration: 22 December 1661 by Gilbert Sheldon

Personal details
- Born: 1 September 1592
- Died: 28 October 1670 (aged 78)
- Denomination: Anglican
- Spouse: (1) Elizabeth Stebbing (2) Frances Bennet
- Education: Westminster School; Trinity College, Cambridge

John Hacket (Born Halket) (1 September 1592 – 28 October 1670) was an English churchman, Bishop of Lichfield and Coventry from 1661 until his death.

== Life ==
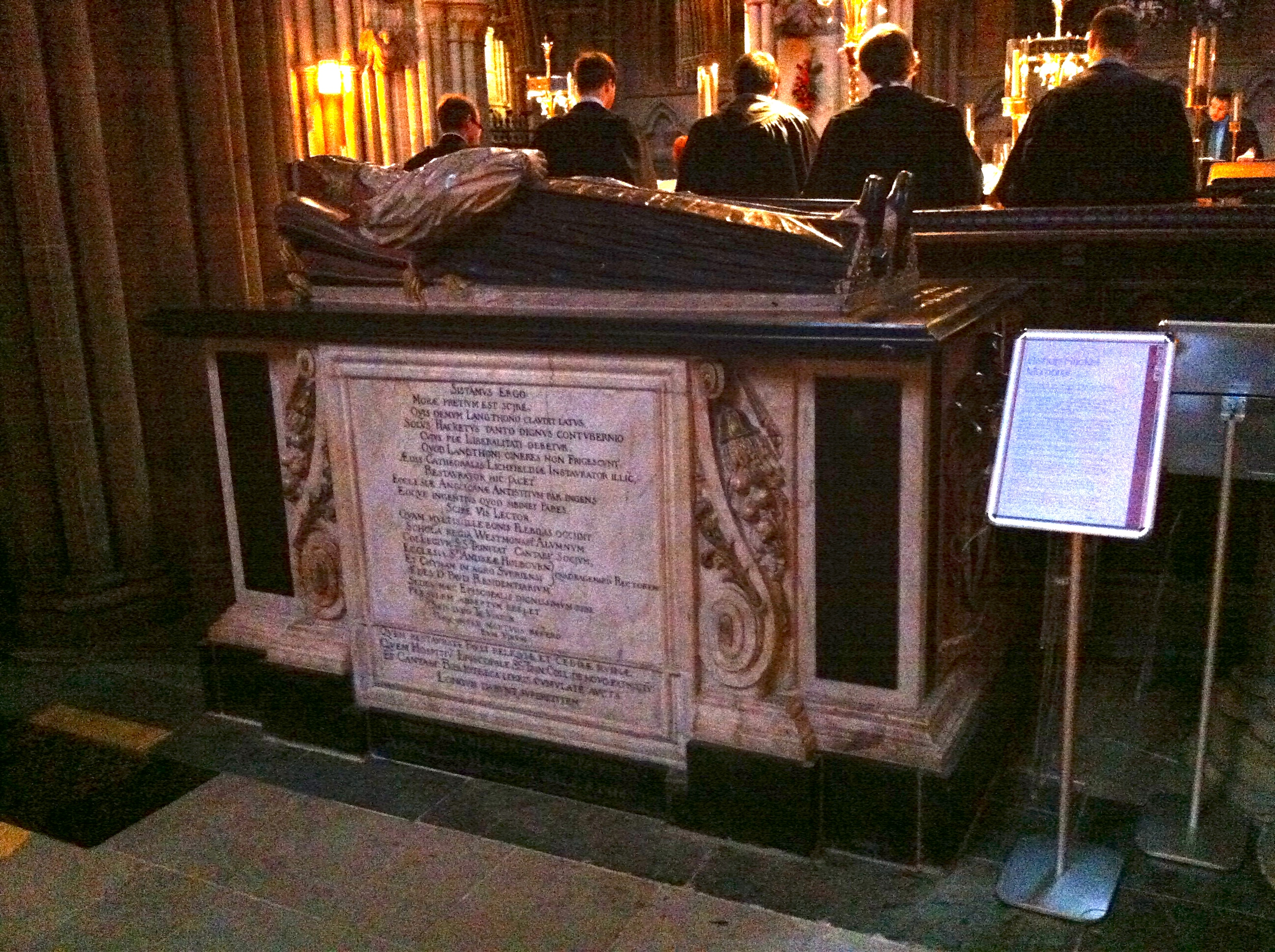
Memorial to John Hacket in Lichfield Cathedral

He was born in London and educated at Westminster and Trinity College, Cambridge. On taking his degree he was elected a fellow of his college, and soon afterwards wrote the comedy, Loiola (London, 1648), which was twice performed before King James I. He was ordained in 1618, and through the influence of John Williams became rector in 1621 of Stoke Hammond, Buckinghamshire, and Kirkby Underwood, Lincolnshire.

In 1623 he was chaplain to James, and in 1624 Williams gave him the livings of St Andrew's, Holborn in London, and Cheam, Surrey. He was Archdeacon of Bedford from 1631 to 1661.

When the so-called Root and Branch Bill was before Parliament in 1641, Hacket was selected to plead in the House of Commons for the continuance of cathedral establishments. In 1645 his living of St Andrew's was sequestered, but he was allowed to retain the other, ceding it for practical reasons in 1662.

On the accession of Charles II, his fortunes improved; he frequently preached before the king, and was elected Bishop of Lichfield and Coventry after the bishopric was rejected by the Presbyterian leader Edmund Calamy the elder. Hacket was elected to the See on 6 December, confirmed on 20 December, and consecrated a bishop on 22 December 1661. His time at the Cathedral coming immediately after the English Civil War meant that Hacket had the unenviable task of overseeing the restoration of Lichfield Cathedral.

He has a near life-size effigy at rest over marble plaques in Lichfield Cathedral.

== Works ==
His best-known book is the biography of his patron, Archbishop Williams, entitled Scrinia reserata: a Memorial offered to the great Deservings of John Williams, D.D. (London, 1693).

Church of England titles
Preceded by Accepted Frewen	Bishop of Lichfield; 1661–1670	Succeeded by Thomas Wood
