= John Addenbrooke (priest) =

English Anglican priest

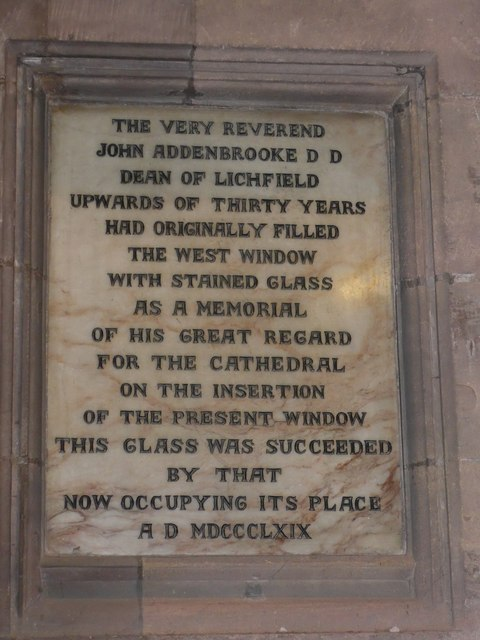
Memorial in Lichfield Cathedral

John Addenbrooke or Addenbrook (bapt. 21 December 1691 – 25 February 1776) was an English Anglican priest who was Dean of Lichfield from 1745 until his death in 1776.

Addenbrooke was the eldest son of Rev. John Addenbrooke (1652–1724) of Upper Sapey, Herefordshire, and his wife, Elizabeth Nash.

He was educated at St Catharine's College, Cambridge; he was Rector of Sudbury, Derbyshire before his time as Dean.

He married Dorothy, daughter and co-heiress of John Wedgwood of Harracles Hall, Staffordshire.
