= William Binckes =

English preacher and sermon writer

William Binckes (bapt. 25 May 1653 – 19 June 1712) was an English preacher and sermon writer, noted for his term as Dean of Lichfield.

== Biography ==
Binckes was born at Cheapside, London, the son of Richard Binckes. He was baptised there at St Mildred, Poultry. He was educated at Westminster School and St. John's College, Cambridge, where he graduated B.A. in 1674, was elected to a fellowship at Peterhouse, and took the degree of M.A. in 1678. He was instituted to the prebend of Nassington, in the church of Lincoln on 2 May 1683, and to that of Basset Parva, in the church of Lichfield, 15 July 1697. In 1699 he took the degree of D.D. On 30 January 1701, being then proctor of the Diocese of Lichfield, he preached before the lower house of convocation a sermon on the martyrdom of Charles I of England, in which he drew a parallel between it and the crucifixion of Jesus Christ, maintaining that having regard to the superior dignity of a king of England in actual possession of his crown as compared with one who was merely an uncrowned king of the Jews, and moreover disclaimed temporal sovereignty, the execution at Whitehall was an act of greater enormity than was committed at Calvary. The sermon having been printed was brought to the notice of the House of Lords, and a suggestion was made that it should be publicly burned. The peers, however, contented themselves with resolving that it contained 'several expressions that give just scandal and offence to all Christian people.' On 19 June 1703 he was installed dean of Lichfield. In 1705 he was appointed prolocutor to convocation. In the early 1700s (1704 has been found written on the plaster inside the house and in 1706, an Act of Queen Anne annexed the rectoryship to the Dean), he built a fine Queen Anne rectory in Tatenhill, Staffordshire which is a Grade II* listed building. In 2008, this house was one of four finalists for Country Life magazine's “England's Finest Parsonage” contest. having won the West of England section. He died on 19 June 1712 and was buried at Leamington, of which place he had been vicar. Dean Binckes built the existing deanery at Lichfield. He published his sermons between 1702 and 1716.
