= Henry Savage (Dean of Lichfield) =

Henry Edwin Savage (11 September 1854 – 19 April 1939) was an Anglican priest in the first half of the 20th century.

He was born in Nuneaton, Warwickshire, the son of Rev. Robert Chapman Savage and Emma Storr. He was educated at Haileybury and Christ's College, Cambridge. After this he was elected a Fellow of Corpus Christi College, Cambridge and ordained in 1878. He began his career with a curacy at St Luke's, New Chesterton and was then Chaplain to the Bishop of Durham. Later he held incumbencies at Pelton, West Hartlepool and South Shields before his elevation in 1909 to the Deanery of Lichfield Cathedral. He died in 1939 in Lichfield. There is a memorial to him within the cathedral.
