= Adult Learning Wales =

Registered charity and adult education provider

Adult Learning Wales (Welsh: Addysg Oedolion Cymru) is a registered charity and adult education provider serving the whole of Wales. It was formed on the merger of Workers' Educational Association WEA Cymru and the YMCA Community College on 1 August 2015, and adopted the present name in November 2016. WEA Cymru was itself a product of a recent merger, when on 10 January 2014 WEA South Wales joined with Coleg Harlech WEA (North).

== Workers' education in Wales ==
The Workers Educational Association (WEA) was founded in London in 1903 by Albert Mansbridge and Frances, his wife. The impetus for the creation of a Welsh branch of the association is traceable to a conference that was held in Cory Hall in Cardiff, South Wales, in October 1906 which Albert Mansbridge initiated. (Note: Lewis 1993 may be consulted for a more detailed version of the following account.) Over 250 representatives of local councils, trade unions, the co-operative movement and the local university college attended the conference. Welsh author Peter Stead (1977) commented: 'The W.E.A. consciously aimed at an alliance between the classes, and it came into Wales at precisely the moment when the need for such an alliance was being felt.' The first sub-branch of the association was formed in nearby Barry in 1906, which was followed in 1907 by the creation of an autonomous South Wales region. Subsequently, between 1910 and 1912 university colleges in Bangor, Aberystwyth and Cardiff established Tutorial Class Committees under the direct influence of the WEA. Stead (1977) observed:

'The Cardiff Committee in particular worked closely with and relied heavily on the W.E.A. At last the University had found an acceptable formula for instituting adult education, and it was this partnership of the university colleges and the W.E.A. which established the tutorial class as the basis of the new movement.'

Lewis (2007) traced the origin of the initiative to Oxford and working-class education, an influential report of a conference that was held in the University of Oxford on the university and workers' education. However, the formula didn't solve the underlying problem that the W.E.A. was facing, the challenge that was posed to 'its explicit desire to collaborate with the existing agancies of educational provision and their middle-class leaderships' by the Independent Working Class Education movement. Moreover, as Stead (1977) observed: 'the growing strength of trade unionism and the growing confidence of trade union leaders ... created the need for an alternative kind of education.' Also, in 1909 the Labour College movement emerged, the impetus for which occurred in Oxford. A group of militant students in Ruskin College who were dissatisfied with its education policy formed the Plebs' League, which had its own journal The Plebs Magazine, which became 'the cutting edge in South Wales both for a new independent adult-education movement and for the general cause of Marxism.' The leading lights of the strike included Noah Ablett and Ted Gill. Ablett proclaimed his views in the first issue of the magazine in February 1909 with his article The relation of Ruskin College to the Labour Movement. He argued:

'With the successful growth of independence in the political arena the hosts of reaction, in their innumerable guises, are making desperate attempts to prevent the same success in other departments. Nowhere is this more evident than in the controversial sphere of education. The number of attempts to impose education from "above" are legion. Prominent among them stands the University Extension movement with its powerful ally the Workers' Educational Association.'

Ablett concluded: 'Education, particularly the kind needed by the workers, is not that impartial universal thing so much gushed about by educationalists.'

Stead (1977) observed: 'by 1914 [the W.E.A.] could claim to be a broadly-based movement.' However, the strong opposition from the South Wales branch of the Plebs League and the new Central Labour College in Oxford 'succeeded in making it impossible for any other movement to win mass support. Most critically, they had made it certain that the S.W.M.F. [the South Wales Miners' Federation] would not throw its resources on to the side of the W.E.A.' Consequently, as an anyonymous contributor to Welsh Outlook, Observer (1916), observed: 'Worthy though its objects are ... the W.E.A. has not caught on in South Wales' and 'it has had only a very slight influence on the intellectual life of South Wales miners.' Lewis (2007) was blunt. He observed: the clash 'could not have come at a worse time for the WEA in south Wales for by [1911] branch activity within the region had all but ceased.'

In October 1915, John Thomas, the tutor/supervisor of the district was forced to resign. No class activity occurred in 1916. However, in 1917 John Davidson was appointed as a full-time replacement tutor/supervisor, who convened a conference on educational reconstruction which was attended by three hundred delegates. But in July 1919 he left his role to take up an appointment in London. Then, in the November, John Davies was appointed as the secretary of the district. Davies (1959) observed: '... under his guidance the work of the W.E.A. in Wales expanded rapidly, the number of students attending classes and courses rising from about 250 in 1919-20 to over 8,000 in 1937.

From 1925, a new North Wales district of the WEA was set up, with R. Silyn Roberts as its first District Secretary. By 1927 classes in existence had trebled, providing for 1250 adults. After Silyn's early death in 1930, his widow, Mary Silyn Roberts, succeeded him as Secretary, also a lecturer, and the association continued to grow, with over 3,562 learners in 1945.

Coleg Harlech in Harlech, Gwynedd, Mid Wales was founded in 1927 by Thomas Jones, Cabinet Secretary to both David Lloyd George and Stanley Baldwin, to continue the work of WEA in a residential environment.

On 1 August 2001, the North Wales district of the Workers' Educational Association and Coleg Harlech in Mid Wales merged to form Coleg Harlech WEA (North). The merged Association continued the common longstanding tradition of liberal arts adult education to enable adults to develop their capacity to learn and fulfil their potential, but also continued to enlarge this by developing vocational education and training, including providing opportunities for socially and educationally disadvantaged adults both in residence at Harlech and in communities and workplaces across North and Mid Wales.

In its heyday, the WEA in Wales published The Highway in English, and Lleufer in Welsh, the latter under the editorship of David Thomas.

=== The YMCA Community College ===
The YMCA Community College was an independent body linked to the wider YMCA movement. It provided adult education, mostly to male learners, often vulnerable people, including ex-offenders and youth workers, across the whole of Wales.

== Adult education in Wales ==
Adult Learning Wales/Addysg Oedolion Cymru has a presence across Wales. It provides adult education throughout Wales, sometimes in its own buildings but often in rented accommodation, as required.

The Association is a registered charity with the Charity Commission (registration number 1071234) and a company limited by guarantee (company number 3109524), which is governed by a Council of trustees. It is a membership based organisation at £10 per annum. Students, former students, staff and other people wishing to support the Association are particularly encouraged to apply. There is a branch network throughout Wales. The main source of funding is the Welsh Government as a designated institution under the Further and Higher Education Act 1992. Since renaming as Adult Learning Wales – Addysg Oedolion Cymru, the organisation additionally retains the branding of previous institutions.

== External link ==
- Official Website
