= Adult education in the United Kingdom =

Adult schools in the United Kingdom were first formed in 1798 to teach working people to read—and, if they wished, to write. Arithmetic was considered an unsuitable subject on their day of rest. In their heyday, Adult Schools had over one hundred thousand members around the country: the groups affiliated to County Unions and, in 1899, the National Adult School Union was founded.

== Early history ==
Samuel Fox is credited with helping William Singleton to start the first "Adult School" in Nottingham, England in 1798. Initially, the classes were for young women from local lace and hosiery factories. William Singleton, a Methodist, started the school, but it was Fox and the staff from his grocer shop that maintained it. Fox's staff was expected to teach at this school and Fox provided breakfast at 9 a.m. on a Sunday after they had completed two hours of teaching. The school grew to include men, but it was said that Fox was specifically interested in improving adult education. Lessons are believed to have started with a Bible reading, but the book was then used as a textbook to enable scholars to practise reading and writing. Fox conducted lessons for three mornings a week for students of more advanced arithmetic and he would fund some to go to become teachers themselves.

== 20th century ==
Adult education grew in the United Kingdom in the 20th century as an outreach of the university education that Balliol College, Oxford provided, the legacy of Benjamin Jowett. Soon after Sandie Lindsay, 1st Baron Lindsay of Birker, the Scottish academic and peer, arrived at the College in 1906, he was "drawn into this movement of Adult Education" and "remained deeply committed to it all his life." Adult education was then "an exciting field" because of Albert Mansbridge having brought together two elements of it to make "a new force from the combination". One of the elements was "the movement of the universities to extend their teaching and offer it to the many large centres of population which had then no university, and to the great majority of the citizens of the country who had no hope of getting a university education." The other element was 'a grass-roots movement consisting of the working-class organisations which provided education for its members.'

== Organisation ==
Individual schools were affiliated to the National Adult School Union. At an event in October 1948 in Nottingham to celebrate the Union's 150th anniversary, it was stated that delegates from between 700 and 800 schools across England, Wales and Scotland were invited.

In 1965 the National Adult School Organisation (NASO), an advocacy group for adult education in the United Kingdom, was chartered. NASO was a voluntary organisation with about 80 groups across England. It closed in 2010.

== See also ==
- Adult education
- Adult high school
- Adult Learning Wales, Registered charity and adult education provider
- Open University, Public research university in the UK
- Workers' Educational Association, UK provider of adult education and charity
