= Daniel Lleufer Thomas =

Welsh barrister and social reformer (1863–1940)

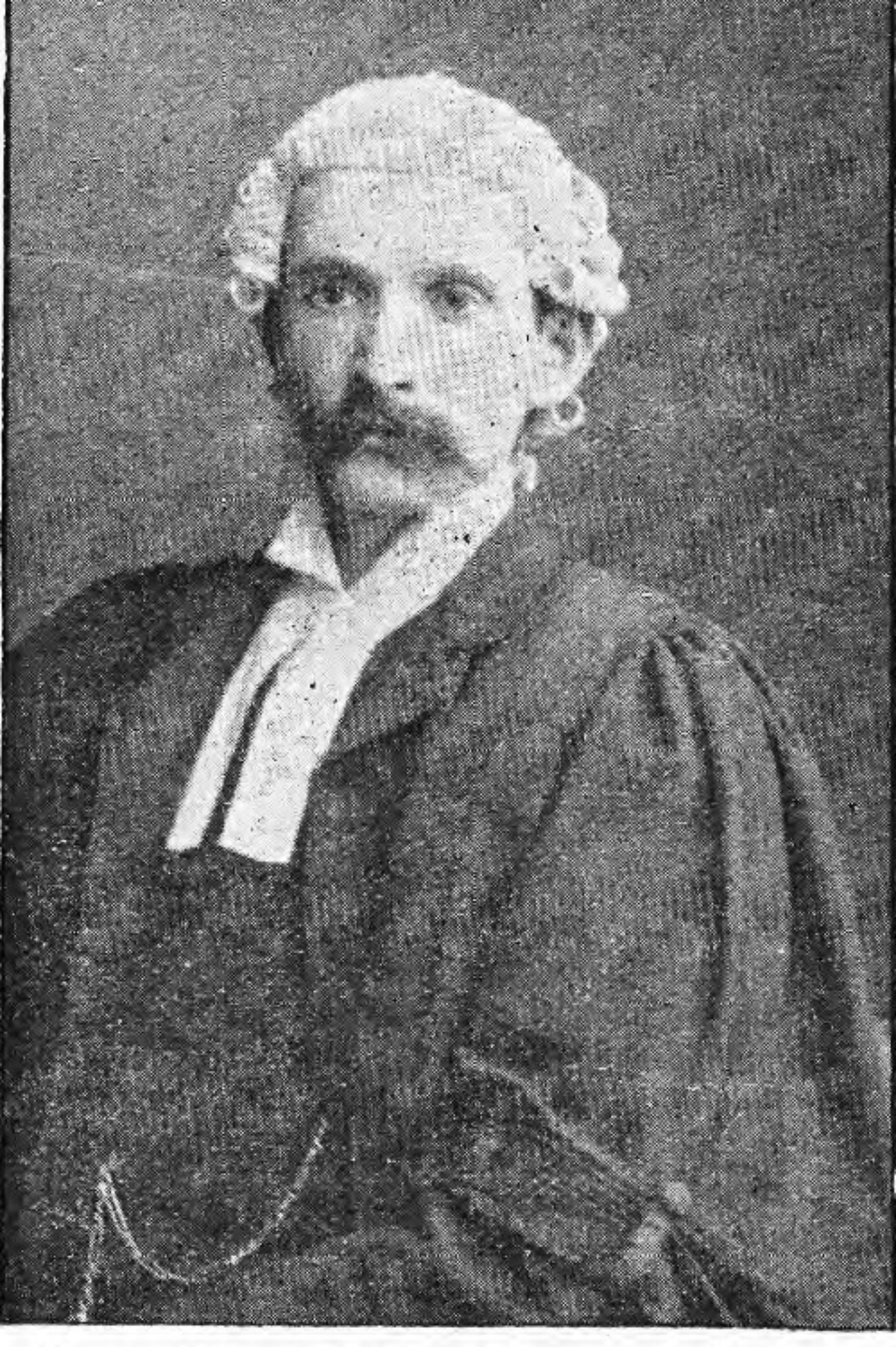
Daniel Lleufer Thomas, 1896 photograph

Sir Daniel Lleufer Thomas (29 August 1863 – 8 August 1940) was a Welsh barrister, social reformer and writer. He was born on 29 August 1863 to William and Esther Thomas in Cwm-du, near Talley, Carmarthenshire, in West Wales. After attending Llandovery College, he studied at Oxford University, from which he graduated in 1887. While in university, he read for the Bar and was one of the seven founders of the Dafydd ap Gwilym Society. In 1892, Thomas married Mary Gethin from Aberdare, a great-grand-daughter of Thomas Evans (Tomos Glyn Cothi).

== Early life ==
Thomas was born on 29 August 1863, the third child of William and Esther Thomas, in Cwm-du, near Talley, Carmarthenshire, West Wales. He received occasional education from Jonah Evans, who opened a local preparatory school in Llansawel (the Sawel Academy) in 1861 (Note: Evans had previously attended Carmarthen College from 1859-61. (Owen 2001).), while working on his father's farm. Later, in 1880, and while 17 years old, Thomas enrolled in Llandovery College, where the headmaster, Alfred George Edwards (who was later to become the first Archbishop of Wales), persuaded his parents to apply for a place for him at Oxford University. Thomas enrolled in the university in 1883 and graduated in 1887 with a First Class Honours degree in Jurisprudence. (Note: In contrast Williams 1959 documented that the degree was a Third Class one.) While there he won the prestigious Tancred Scholarship, which he held from 1886 to 1892 and which enabled him to read for the Bar, to which he was called in 1889. Also while there Thomas was one of the seven founders of the Dafydd ap Gwilym Society, at which he read a paper in one of its early meetings. Around the time, Thomas adopted the name LLeufer, which is Welsh for light. (Note: Lleufer was later adopted as the name of the journal of the Welsh branch of the Workers' Educational Association. David Thomas (1944), the editor of Lleufer, stated in his editorial of its first issue that its title was fitting because Sir Daniel Lleufer Thomas, as he had become, was one of the first founders of the branch and its president. (Thomas 1944, p. 1).) Later Thomas was associated with T.E. Ellis, informally known as Tom Ellis, in establishing the London-based Cymru Fydd.

== Later life ==
After Oxford, in 1889 Thomas joined the South Wales Circuit of the Bar of England and Wales. However, he didn't excel at as a barrister. Instead he later became prominent in public life, to which he made many contributions. Initially in 1890 he made a foray into politics by agreeing to be nominated as the Liberal candidate for the vacancy in East Carmarthenshire following the death of David Pugh, the previous incumbent. However, he withdrew before the selection conference. In 1891 Thomas began contributing to the Dictionary of National Biography. (Note: Randall 1940 documented that his initials are attached to about 150 articles in the Dictionary. In contrast, Williams 1959 documented that he contributed 27 biographies.) Then in 1892 he was appointed the Assistant Commissioner to the Royal Commission on Labour, while in the following year he became the Secretary of the Welsh Land Commission, a post which he held until 1896. Thomas wrote a digest of the Report of the Commission about which obituarist Randall (1940) referred to the appendix, which he commended as containing 'such a mass of miscellaneous historical information that many historical scholars keep it as a ready work of reference.' (Note: The Digest was accompanied by a volume of thirteen appendices. (Thomas 1896, p. 21). The Appendix to which Randall referred is Appendix C, which 'contains a review of the periodical literature of Wales in so far as it throws light upon Welsh agriculture and land tenure' and 'deals with (1) The Welsh Magazines (1770-1870); (2) Early Welsh Newspapers, and gives an exhaustive list (with particulars) of Periodicals and Newspapers published in Wales, in Welsh or English, in 1895, and of Periodicals issued in connection with Wales.' (Thomas 1896, p. 22).)

In 1909 Thomas was appointed as the Stipendiary magistrate for Pontypridd and the Rhondda, which office he held until 1933. Thomas later became the chairman of, respectively, the South Wales Garden Cities and Town Planning Association and the Welsh Housing and Development Association, in which capacities he edited issues of The Welsh Housing Year Book. (Note: Davies 1999 documented, based on a lecture that he had given to the Honourable Society of Cymmrodorion at the British Academy in 1998, that the Welsh Housing Association (sic) was founded in 1908 and the South Wales Garden Cities and Town Planning Association was founded in 1914, and that in 1919 both bodies joined the South Wales Reconstruction Association to found the Welsh Housing and Development Association.) The first edition of the Year Book, which was edited by Edgar Chappell, was published in 1916. In it, and in his former capacity, Thomas stated: 'A rural type of social life has to be evolved which will withstand the attractions of the towns' (Note: Quoted by White 2024, p. 6). (Note: White 2024, p. 6 commented: 'Thomas recognized the negative health and social implications of overpopulated towns, seeing the solution as a gradual migration of town populations out towards to the rural areas beyond the city.') In his latter capacity he edited the 1919 edition, to which he contributed the extremely influential chapter The regional treatment of housing and development problems in South Wales, the 1922 edition (Note: The edition was very favourably reviewed by Roberts 1922.) and the 1927 edition. During the period of his editorships, in 1917 Thomas was the Chairman of the Welsh Section of the Commission on Industrial Unrest.

Thomas was knighted in February 1931. His portrait was painted by Margaret Lindsay Williams in 1938 and is currently held in the National Museum Wales. In 1939 Thomas was awarded the medal of the Honourable Society of Cymmrodorion in recognition of his distinguished services to Wales. He is buried in Oystermouth Cemetery, Mumbles, Swansea, alongside his wife Mary.

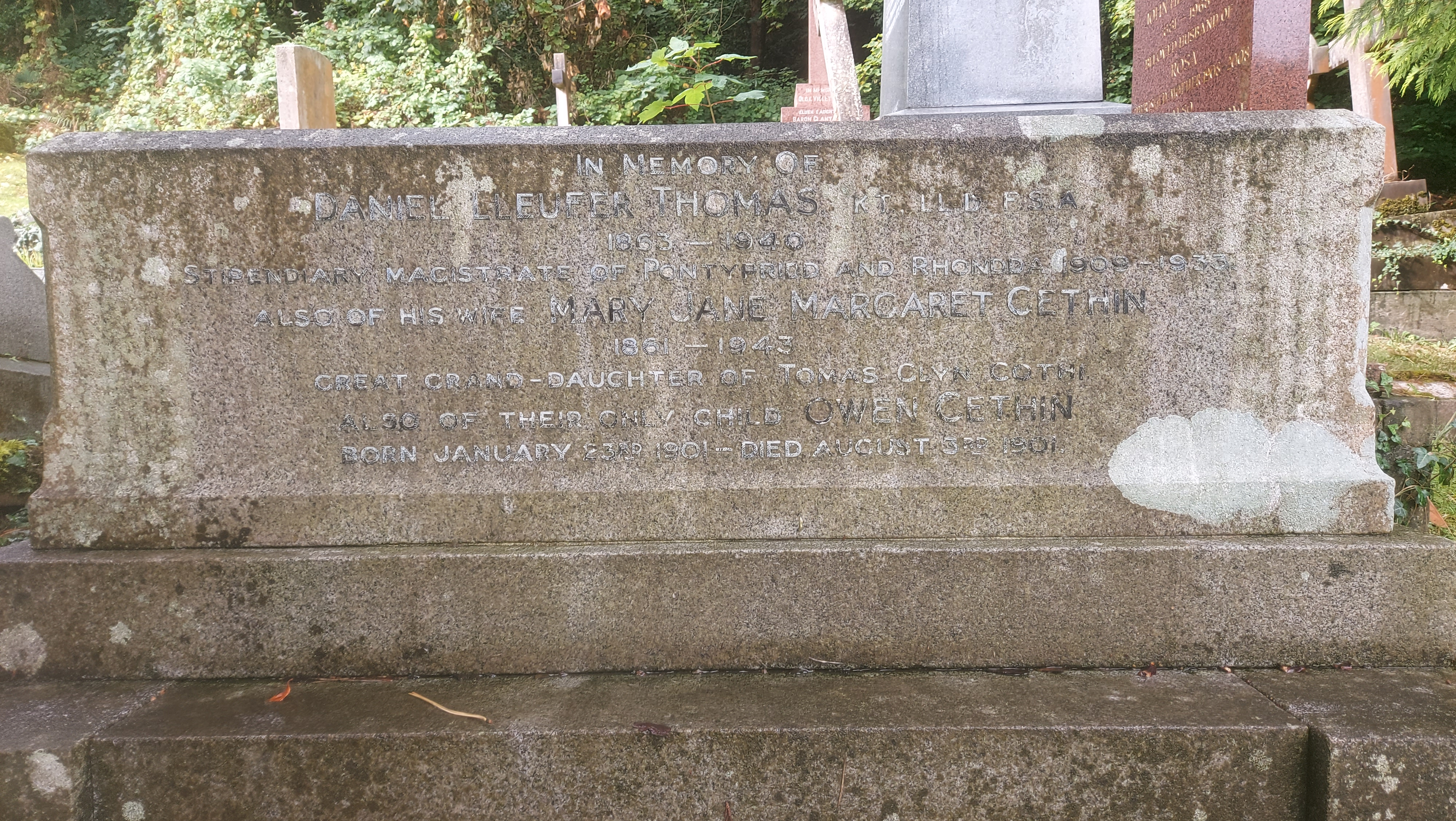
Grave of Daniel Lleufer Thomas (1863-1940).

== Publications ==
- Thomas, D. Llleufer (1892). "The agricultural labourer in Wales". Young Wales. 4: 183-186, 197-202.
- —— (1901). "Lewis Morris in Cardiganshire". Y Cymmrodor. XV: 1-87.
- (With Herbert Morgan) —— (1912). Housing conditions in Wales. London: Welsh Housing Association.
- —— (1916). "University tutorial class for working people". The Transactions of the Honourable Society of Cwmmrodorion: 69-135.
- —— (1941). Richard, A.J. (ed.). "Iscennen and Golden Grove". The Transactions of the Honourable Society of Cymmrodorion. 115–129.
- —— (1941). "Welshmen and the first folio of Shakespear's plays (1643)". Transactions of the Honourable Society of Cymmrodorion: 101-114.
