= Workers' Educational Association - South Australia =

Educational Association in South Australia

The Workers' Educational Association of South Australia Inc.
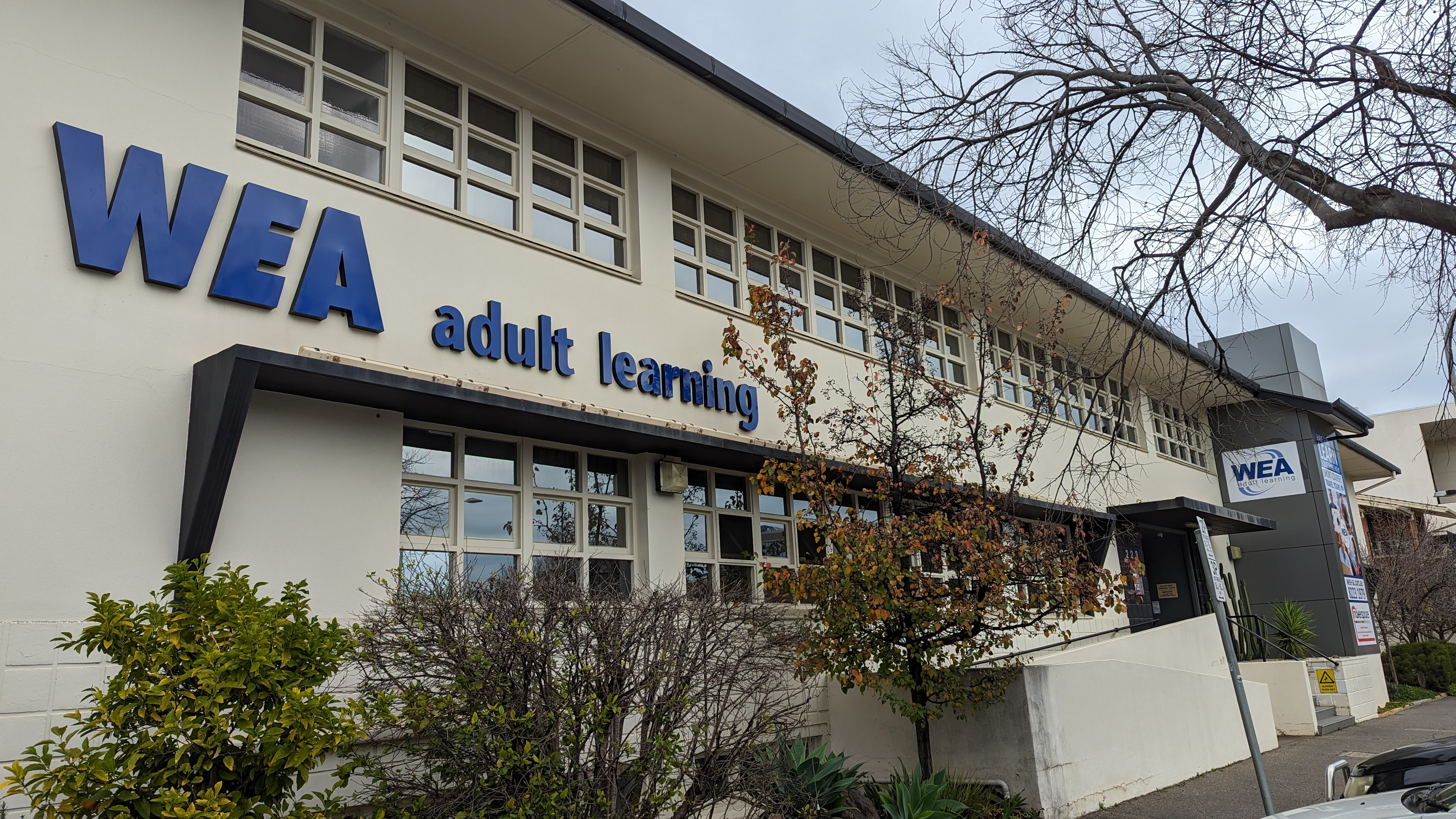
- The WEA building in Angas Street

Location
- 223 Angas Street; Adelaide, South Australia, 5000; 34.9298°S 138.6094°E

Information
- Type: independent, not-for-profit, non-government association
- Established: 1913
- Category: adult community education
- Chair: Simon Velvin
- Enrollment: 17,000
- Tuition: moderately priced
- Website: www.wea-sa.com.au

The Workers' Educational Association - South Australia (WEA-SA) is a non-government adult education organisation based in Adelaide, South Australia that is independent and not-for-profit. It was founded in 1913 in association with the Trade Union movement and the University of Adelaide. It is one of Australia's longest running providers of community-based adult learning. WEA-SA offers year-long courses, short courses, lectures, cultural programs, travel and interest clubs designed to promote adult lifelong learning.

== History ==
In 1913, Francis Manbridge and Albert Mansbridge, the founders of WEA in the United Kingdom, visited Adelaide as part of their tour of Australia to promote their vision of establishing the WEA in Australia. This tour followed the 1910 visit of William Temple, the president of the WEA in the United Kingdom. Their mission was to make further education possible for working people.

The first annual meeting of the WEA was held on Wednesday 15 April 1914 with delegates from seventeen trade unions and the University of Adelaide with delegates from the School of Mines and the Public Library to be appointed. The meeting was chaired by Hon Thomas Ryan MP who was elected WEA's first President. In 1917, the WEA organised a library, and on 17 April the first Tutorial class on Economics taught by Herbert Heaton was offered with enrollment of 130 students. The other course offered in the first year was English Literature 1. Both subjects were designed as three year courses with similar subject matter as the university courses but with no examinations. By 1918 the first annual report re-stated the aim of the WEA: 'To bring about an alliance between Labour and Learning'. The report presented to the Federal Conference of the directors of University tutorial classes and secretaries of State branches stated that the WEA consisted of 56 organisations, including 35 Trade Unions, the University of Adelaide, the Public library, the School of Mines and the S A Baptist Union. The report claimed that thousands of students had been enrolled.

The close association with the University of Adelaide continued until 1958 when, due to increasing pressure on space, the WEA moved to premises at South Terrace. The bookshop however remained on the university grounds, and the WEA and the University continued to offer courses in a joint program. The bookshop started in a corner of the WEA office to sell books to students enrolled in WEA courses. By 1939 its success and significance meant that George McRitchie was appointed to Bookroom Manager and the bookshop was located in the Mitchell Building on the University grounds. Profits from the bookshop enabled the WEA-SA to continue when government grants were decreased or withdrawn and during the Great Depression and the Second World War. In 1970, after ten years of controversial negotiations between the University, the Student Union and the WEA, the Bookshop was sold to the University for £85,000 and became a book service run by the University.

In the 1950s, the WEA-SA had begun to run shorter recreational or lifestyle courses such as Art and Music as well as Flower Arrangement, Deportment and Interior Decoration. Courses were also held on languages, English composition, music and psychology. Growing interest in nature and the environment meant courses about trees, plants and gardening were popular. In 1950 five prisoners from Yatala Prison were given permission to attend WEA courses at the request of the Howard League for Penal Reform of SA. New premises at 79-80 South Terrace were opened on 11 June 1958 by the Premier, Sir Thomas Playford. In 1958 63 classes with a total enrollment of 3,239 were organised by the WEA in co-operation with the University of Adelaide. However the new Department of Adult Education of the University retained the student fees. Independent classes in Interior Decoration, Flower Arrangement, Handwriting, Photography and Lino-Block Printing were administered and run solely by the WEA.

In 1962, Graham's Castle at Goolwa was purchased as a residential college. Courses offered there included history, botany, ornithology and painting. Graham's Castle was sold in 1972.

The partnership of nearly 60 years of offering a joint program with the University of Adelaide ended in 1972. The issue which finally ended the partnership was the WEA wanting to provide courses such as Palmistry. The University objected to such courses being run on the University campus. The WEA continued to meet the demand for these courses at other locations. The WEA responded to changing societal needs with shorter courses in a broader range of subjects as the demand increased for skills in daily living rather than university style programs. As education standard levels improved, along with the higher standard of living, courses in alternative medicine, interpersonal relationships and travel planning became more popular.

Support from Trade Union movement continued in the form of donations. In 1964, Trade Union Postal Courses offering subjects such as How to Study; Arithmetic and Statistics and World Affairs. Bob Hawke, future Prime Minister, ran a course on Trade Union Advocacy. The Trade Union Postal Courses were offered for the last time in 1991.

A warehouse and chocolate factory in Angas Street owned by H H Tandy of Life-Saver was purchased in 1983 using a series of grants and sales of properties. The building was to be renovated into teaching spaces, offices and student areas. A child care centre was planned for the caretaker's cottage next door which was included in the sale. The renovations were carried out by volunteers, staff and job seekers. The new home was opened by John Bannon, Premier of South Australia, on 20 July 1984.

The first WEA-SA educational tour was to China in 1978. After the success of this trip, the WEA ran study tours on flora and fauna of three to four days to the Flinders Ranges, the River Murray, Kangaroo Island and other South Australian sites of interest. WEA Travel was licensed as a travel agency in 1984. It still offers escorted study tours overseas and in Australia. Tour leaders are usually subject specialists, educators or travel professionals.

== History Project 110th Anniversary ==
In 2023, the WEA-SA began a project to document its history. A group of volunteers was formed to sort, catalogue, research and digitise the photographs and documents stored in boxes, shelves and cabinets in the offices and basement of the building in Angas Street. The project was launched by the Governor of South Australia, Her Excellency the Honourable Frances Adamson AC at the WEA-SA Open Day on Sunday 15 October.

The overall objective of the project is to make this information publicly accessible and contribute to the history of South Australia. Documents dating back to 1913 include course guides, bulletins, annual reports, newspaper articles, art works, craft artifacts and photographs. Volunteers of the History Project team use an Optical Character Recognition (OCR) process to convert scanned documents into searchable text files. Research by the team has resulted in participation in the 2024 Festival of the History Trust of South Australia and publication of two chapters in their 20th anniversary book Nooks & Crannies.

== Governance ==
The WEA-SA is incorporated as an independent non-government association. It is funded by student course fees and community grants. The constitution sets out membership rights, general meeting protocols and board responsibilities. The board consists of elected members and one staff member.

Tutors are engaged on a contract sessional basis and are typically subject experts, industry professionals or experienced educators. There are 13 full-time and part-time administration staff and a group of 6-8 volunteers.

== Activities ==
WEA-SA runs over 1,000 short and year long courses each year. The categories are;

- Languages
- Computing and information technology
- Business, investment and training
- Food and beverages
- Creative arts
- Walks, tours, history and culture
- Health and fitness
- Home and lifestyle

WEA Travel (travel license TTA 183) conducts escorted, small group domestic and international package tours. The tours are conducted by experienced guides, historians or subject experts. Itineraries in 2025 included Australian locations such as Hobart, Ceduna and the Murray River and international destinations such as India, Ireland, Greece, Malta, Morocco, Scotland, Sicily, Turkey, Uzbekistan and Vietnam.

The WEA-SA course guides are published five times a year (January, April, June, September and November). They can be accessed by an on-line search, Digital Flipbook, email subscription or printed copy from the WEA-SA Angas Street premises. Course guides are also delivered to Adelaide letterboxes and as inserts in The Sunday Mail and local newspapers.
