= Hsiao Li Lindsay, Baroness Lindsay of Birker =

British peeress (1916–2010)

The Right Honourable The Lady Lindsay of Birker
- Born: Li Yueying; 17 July 1916; Taiyuan, Shanxi, China
- Died: 25 April 2010 (aged 93); Washington, D.C., United States
- Spouse: Michael Lindsay, 2nd Baron Lindsay of Birker
- Parent: Colonel Li Wenqi

Hsiao Li Lindsay, Baroness Lindsay of Birker (Chinese: 李效黎; pinyin: Lǐ Xiàolí; Wade–Giles: Li Hsiao-li; 17 July 1916 – 25 April 2010) was a British peeress who supported Chinese Communist resistance to the Japanese occupation of China during the Second World War.

== Early life and wartime activity ==
Hsiao Li was born Li Yueying (Chinese: 李月英) in Taiyuan, Shanxi. Her father, Colonel Li Wenqi, was a rich nonconformist Chinese landowner who refused to bind her feet. She took part in student demonstrations at Taiyuan Normal University and was blacklisted by the authorities. She then fled to Beijing, where she changed her name. In Beijing, she entered Yenching University, where she met Michael Lindsay, who was a professor there. Lindsay was using his protected status as a foreign citizen to smuggle radio and medical supplies to the communists, who were resisting the Japanese occupation. He needed a native speaker of Chinese to help him and Hsiao Li agreed to assist him. The couple married on 25 June 1941.

After the Japanese attack on Pearl Harbor, Lindsay found himself a citizen of an enemy state and thus liable for arrest. The Japanese authorities soon came to arrest the couple, but they managed to escape. For the next four years, the pair worked behind enemy lines, with Hsiao Li teaching English to the troops. Two children were born to them during their 500-mile journey on foot to the communist headquarters in Yenan: Erica, born in a hut in the mountains in 1942, and James, born in a hospital cave in Yenan in 1945.

== Baroness Lindsay of Birker ==
After the war, in 1945, Hsiao Li's father-in-law, Sandie Lindsay, was elevated to the peerage as Baron Lindsay of Birker. Hsiao Li and her husband moved to Britain, where they lived with his parents, Sandie and Erica Lindsay, and then to Australia, where he worked at the Australian National University. Another daughter, Mary, was born in 1951. The next year, her husband succeeded his father as 2nd Baron Lindsay of Birker, and Hsiao Li becoming the Baroness Lindsay of Birker. Lord Lindsay's career brought them to Chevy Chase, Maryland, a suburb of Washington, D.C., in 1959, where they remained after his retirement in 1975. The same year, Lady Lindsay became a United States citizen.

The pair visited China in 1949 and 1954; in 1954, they functioned as official interpreters for an unsuccessful Labour Party delegation to China. In 1958, they were refused visas because of Lord Lindsay's criticism of the communist leadership. Their next visit to the country was not until 1973, after which they were very critical of the Cultural Revolution. After her daughter Erica's death in 1993 and Lord Lindsay's death in 1994, Lady Lindsay returned to China, where she had been offered an apartment in Beijing by the Chinese government in gratitude for her work during the war. She lived there until 2003, when she returned to Washington, D.C. to live with her granddaughter, Susan Lawrence. Lady Lindsay's memoirs, written shortly after the war, were translated into English in 2007. She was frequently admitted to hospital in the final three years of her life. She died on 25 April 2010 in Washington, at age 93.

== Bibliography ==
- Lindsay, Hsiao Li: Bold Plum: With the Guerrillas in China's War Against Japan (2007); ISBN 1430302925
