= Li Yueying =

Li Yueying is the name of:

- Hazel Ying Lee (1912–1944), Chinese-American pilot
- Hsiao Li Lindsay, Baroness Lindsay of Birker (1916–2010), born Li Yueying, British peeress
