= National Coding Week =

National Coding Week was founded by former headteacher Richard Rolfe and tech entrepreneur Jordan Love, who was appointed EU Code Week Ambassador for the UK. It took place during the week commencing September 21, 2014 with the aim of helping adults to improve their digital literacy in order to fill the growing skills gap.

The week is run by volunteers in hubs, libraries, schools, businesses and NGOs with the intention of supporting adults to learn digital skills including coding. Richard Rolfe and Jordan Love were inspired to create the week when they trained a group of unemployed people in coding skills which eventually led to many of them getting jobs. The EU predicts a significant number of digital jobs being unfilled by 2020 due to a skills shortage. Richard and Jordan saw an opportunity to try to inspire adults to gain the skills necessary to fill the gap.

== History ==
In 2015 National Coding Week ran from 21 September and spread beyond the UK. The week gained coverage and support in the EU and in the US. A number of prominent business leaders offered support to National Coding Week including Brian Doll VP of GitHub, Prince Andrew, Congressman Kevin McCarthy and Tim Lovejoy.

Boris Johnson the Mayor of London stated that “Coding is a language that is increasingly important for both young people and adults to understand, but it can be an intimidating prospect. National Coding Week will help to make whole generations of Brits more comfortable with coding, allowing them to embrace the business opportunities of the future.”. One of the aims of the week was to also encourage women to get involved in coding Martha Lane Fox's drive to bridge the gender gap in tech gave prominence to the week. Over 100 events and 1000 people took part in 2015. Events occurred all over Wales in libraries and hubs and was supported by WEA YMCA Community College Cymru and the Welsh Government

Speaking at the launch event in Cardiff Central Library Hub's new digital floor, the Deputy Minister for Culture, Sport and Tourism, Ken Skates, said “Learning new skills such as coding can open new doors to people. We are increasingly moving into an online world and it is important that people do not miss out on opportunities to develop these skills, which have the potential to create employment opportunities. I’m delighted to launch the National Coding Week in Wales and am pleased this is taking place in a library, which is the ideal place to get support to learn new skills. It’s particularly good to launch it in the new digital floor of Cardiff Central Library, which received a grant from the Welsh Government towards its modernisation.”

In Scotland Polly Purvis head of ScotlandIS outlined Scottish plans for future tech growth and how National Coding Week fitted in. Free coding lessons for adults were also offered all over Scotland.

In England, Schools, Hubs, Businesses and libraries supported the week.

In November 2015 Richard and Jordan won the CIPD Award for Diversity and Inclusion Strategy for their efforts in inspiring adults from all backgrounds to gain digital skills.

National Coding Week 2021 will run from 13 September to 27 September.
