= John Mansbridge =

John Mansbridge may refer to:

- John Mansbridge (artist) (1901–1981), British artist
- John B. Mansbridge (1917–2016), American art director
