= Day school =

Type of school

A day school can be for children or adults. Day schools for children form part of their education. Day schools for adults can be part of adult education, one-off events or of various kinds.

== Day schools for children ==
A day school, sometimes called an 'all-day school' or 'full-day schools', for children provides education for them while they are living at home. The provision of education for children in day schools contrasts with that provided by boarding schools, in which the children live during term times, between which they return home.

Day schools for children have storied histories in Europe and North America. For example:

- Church (1870) discussed the advantages and disadvantages of day-schools in England
- Beale (1873) discussed girls' day schools in England
- Wilkinson (1905) discussed day-schools in the United States
- Avrich (2006) discussed the (1910-1960) Modern Sunday School movement in the United States that was undertaken under the auspices of the anarchist movement
- Raptis (2016) discussed the education of Tsimshian children in the day schools which were run by Methodists between the 1930s and the 1970s in Canada
- Chiapparini et al (2019) discussed the provision of all-day schools and social work in Switzerland
- Fischer and Klieme (2013) discussed the quality and effectiveness of German all-day schools.

== Day schools for adults ==
A day school for adults can be held as part of adult education or as a one-off event and can be held by a society or a university. Kelly (1919) and Tieman and Black (2017) discussed day schools that are parts of adult education. In contrast,

NeCamp (2014) discussed day schools that are one-off events. Examples of one-off events include those which examine an historical event or phenomenon, or which commemorate or honour one or more notable people, or which commemorate an historical event. (Note: Anglican priest Walter Matthews (Matthews 1937) examined the concept of an historical event.)

An example of a day school which commemorated two notable people was held on 26 April 1997 in Merthyr Tydfil, Wales to commemorate historians Gwyn A. Williams and D.J.V. Jones, who had recently died. An example of a day school which honoured a notable person was held on 6 May 2006 in Ystradgynlais, also in Wales, to honour the life and work of Menna Gallie, the Welsh author.

== See also ==
- Adult education
- Adult education in the United Kingdom
- Country day schools
- Jewish day school
- Private school
