= Lleufer =

Welsh-language literary magazine

Lleufer was a quarterly Welsh-language literary magazine published by the Welsh branch of the Workers’ Educational Association, Cymdeithas Addysg y Gweithwyr yng Nghymru. It contained general and academic articles, book reviews, poetry and fiction, advertisements and society notes.

David Thomas, the editor of the first issue, stated in his editorial of its first issue that its title was fitting because Sir Daniel Lleufer Thomas, as he had become, was one of the first founders of the branch and its president. It was published between 1944 and 1979.

The issues of the magazine up to Volume 26, Issue 4, 1977 have been digitized by the National Library of Wales.

== Reference ==
- Thomas, David (1944). "Nodiadau'r Golygydd". Lleufer. 1: 1.
