= Richard John Lloyd =

British linguist and phoneticist (1846–1906)

Richard John Lloyd (1846–1906) was a British linguist and phoneticist. He researched the acoustics of vowel sounds and articulation, which he deemed “minute phonetics”. His field of work did not become popular until the late 20th century, around 100 years after his original work.

== Life ==
He was born in Liverpool on 14 October 1846, into the well-established family business of Richard Lloyd & Brothers. At first entering the family business, he only attended university later in life, graduating from the University of London in 1875 with a BA.

In 1890 the university awarded him an honorary doctorate (DLitt). In 1897 he was elected a Fellow of the Royal Society of Edinburgh. His proposers were John Gray McKendrick, Alexander Buchan, James Thomson Bottomley and Magnus Maclean. He took a particular interest in Esperanto, and became vice-president of the International Phonetic Association.

Lloyd worked as a customs official and port gauger after he left the university. Lloyd was reported missing on 29 August 1906 while attending an Esperanto Congress in Geneva, and his body was found in the Rhône at Seyssel in France, close to the Swiss border. It was surmised he had fallen in while walking along the river's bank.

His daughter Eirene Theodora married Thomas Jones.

== Publications ==
- Northern English: Phonetics, Grammar, Texts
