= Thomas Ryan (1870–1943) =

Australian politician

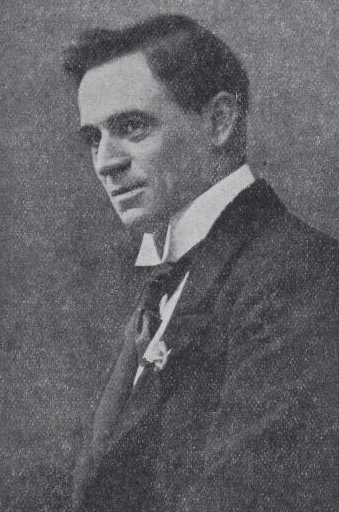

Thomas Ryan (9 January 1870 – 22 November 1943) was a railway worker, estate agent, trade unionist and politician. He served as the Labor member for Torrens (1909–1912) and Sturt (1915–1917) in the South Australian House of Assembly. He was an advocate for the democratisation of education and in 1914 was elected inaugural Chairman of the Workers Educational Association of South Australia. He left the Labor Party in the 1917 Labor split, and served as a National Party member for several months before resigning his South Australian seat upon his election to the Victorian Legislative Assembly at the 1917 Victorian election, serving as the Nationalist Party member for Essendon from 1917 to 1924.

Ryan was born in Ireland arrived in Australia about 1890. He was orphaned at about the age of nine while living in South Africa; little is known of his early life.

Ryan died at the Hotel Australia in Sydney at the age of 73 and was survived by two sons.
