= John Mansbridge (artist) =

English painter

- Born: 1901; United Kingdom
- Died: 1981 (aged 79–80)
- Education: Slade School of Fine Art
- Known for: Painting, poster art, war art
- Patrons: Air Ministry (United Kingdom)

John Mansbridge (1901–1981) was a British artist. He was an official war artist during World War II and Head of Fine Art at Goldsmiths College in London.

== Biography ==
Mansbridge was the son of Albert Mansbridge, the founder of the Workers Educational Association and was educated at Manchester Grammar School. He attended the Slade School of Fine Art in London, where he was taught by Henry Tonks. From 1927 to 1935, he designed posters for the Underground Electric Railways Company of London and then the London Passenger Transport Board. In 1929, Mansbridge began teaching at Goldsmiths' College School of Art and became the senior lecturer in painting there after World War II. As well as holding that post, and being Head of Fine Art, until his retirement in 1966 he also lectured on the history of art and architecture for the extramural department of University of London.

At the beginning of World War II, Mansbridge applied to the War Artists' Advisory Committee, WAAC, for a full-time commission but was refused. He was however employed directly by the Air Ministry as a war artist. In this role he visited various Royal Air Force bases in Britain to paint portraits of pilots and air crew. In due course WAAC purchased several of these portraits and some were included in the Britain at War exhibition held at the Museum of Modern Art in New York during the conflict. Later in the war, Mansbridge was involved in developing camouflage patterns and worked in India and Burma.

Mansbridge was a founder member of the Blackheath Art Society in 1947, with Graham Sutherland as the first President, along with college principals Leonard Daniels, Clive Gardiner and Heber Matthews. In 1969 Mansbridge issued his Graphic History of Architecture (New York: Viking Press, 1967) which was well received. He also produced posters for London Transport and mural panels for the Blue Funnel Line shipping company.

Mansbridge's paintings are held by the British Council, the National Portrait Gallery (London), King's College London and Goldsmiths, University of London. The London Transport Museum holds some of his posters. He painted portraits of: Edgar Algernon Robert Gascoyne-Cecil (1864–1958), 1st Viscount Cecil of Chelwood; Charles Edward Curzon (1878–1954), Bishop of Exeter (1936–1948); The Right Reverend Charles Gore (1853–1932); Ian Gulland, Albert Mansbridge (1876–1952); and Sir John Collings Squire (1932–1933).
