= Michael Lindsay, 2nd Baron Lindsay of Birker =

British baron (1909–1994)

Michael Francis Morris Lindsay, 2nd Baron Lindsay of Birker (24 February 1909 – 13 February 1994), was a British peer and academic.

== Education and life in China ==
Lindsay was the son of Sandie and Erica Lindsay, née Storr. On his mother's side, he was descended from the goldsmith and silversmith Paul Storr; his cousins thus included Rev. Vernon Storr, Archdeacon of Westminster from 1931 to 1936, Rev. Frank Utterton, Archdeacon of Surrey from 1906 to 1908, the obstetrician Sir Francis Champneys, 1st Baronet and his brothers, Basil Champneys and Weldon Champneys, and the artists Rex Whistler and Laurence Whistler.

He was educated at Gresham's School, Holt, and Balliol College Oxford. After Oxford, he became a lecturer at Yenching University in Beiping, China and American University in Washington, D.C.

Using his protected status as a foreign citizen, Lindsay began smuggling radio and medical supplies to the communists, who were resisting the Japanese occupation of China. He needed a native speaker of Chinese, so he recruited his student, Hsiao Li, whom he married on 25 June 1941. They had one son, James, born on 29 January 1945, and two daughters, Erica (1942–1993) and Mary Muriel (born 1951).

Following the attack on Pearl Harbor, Lindsay became a citizen of an enemy state and thus liable for arrest, but the pair managed to escape. For the next four years, they acted behind enemy lines. Lindsay first worked in the communists' Radio Department and then at the New China News Agency. Two children were born to them during their 500-mile journey on foot to the communist headquarters in Yenan: Erica, born in a hut in the mountains in 1942, and James, born in a hospital cave in Yenan in 1945.

== Baron Lindsay of Birker ==
After the war, in 1945, Lindsay's father was created Baron Lindsay of Birker, and he moved to Britain with his wife, where they lived with his parents. They moved to Australia when Lindsay started lecturing at the Australian National University. In 1952, he succeeded to his father's barony. Soon after the war, he became critical of the PRC's increasing authoritarianism, including in a Morrison Lecture. Dissatisfied with his treatment at ANU, seven years later, Lord and Lady Lindsay moved to Washington, D.C., where he taught at the Far Eastern Program at American University until his retirement in 1975. They remained there after he retired. They visited China in 1949 and 1954; in 1954, they functioned as official interpreters for an unsuccessful Labour Party delegation to China. Later, however, they were refused visas because of Lord Lindsay's criticism of the communist leadership. Lord and Lady Lindsay were only able to enter the country after the death of Mao Zedong. Lord Lindsay died in 1994, a year after his daughter Erica. He was succeeded by his son James Lindsay, 3rd Baron Lindsay of Birker.

== Notes ==
Peerage of the United Kingdom
Preceded by Alexander Lindsay	Baron Lindsay of Birker; 1952-1994	Succeeded by James Lindsay
