= The Right Honourable =

Honorific prefix

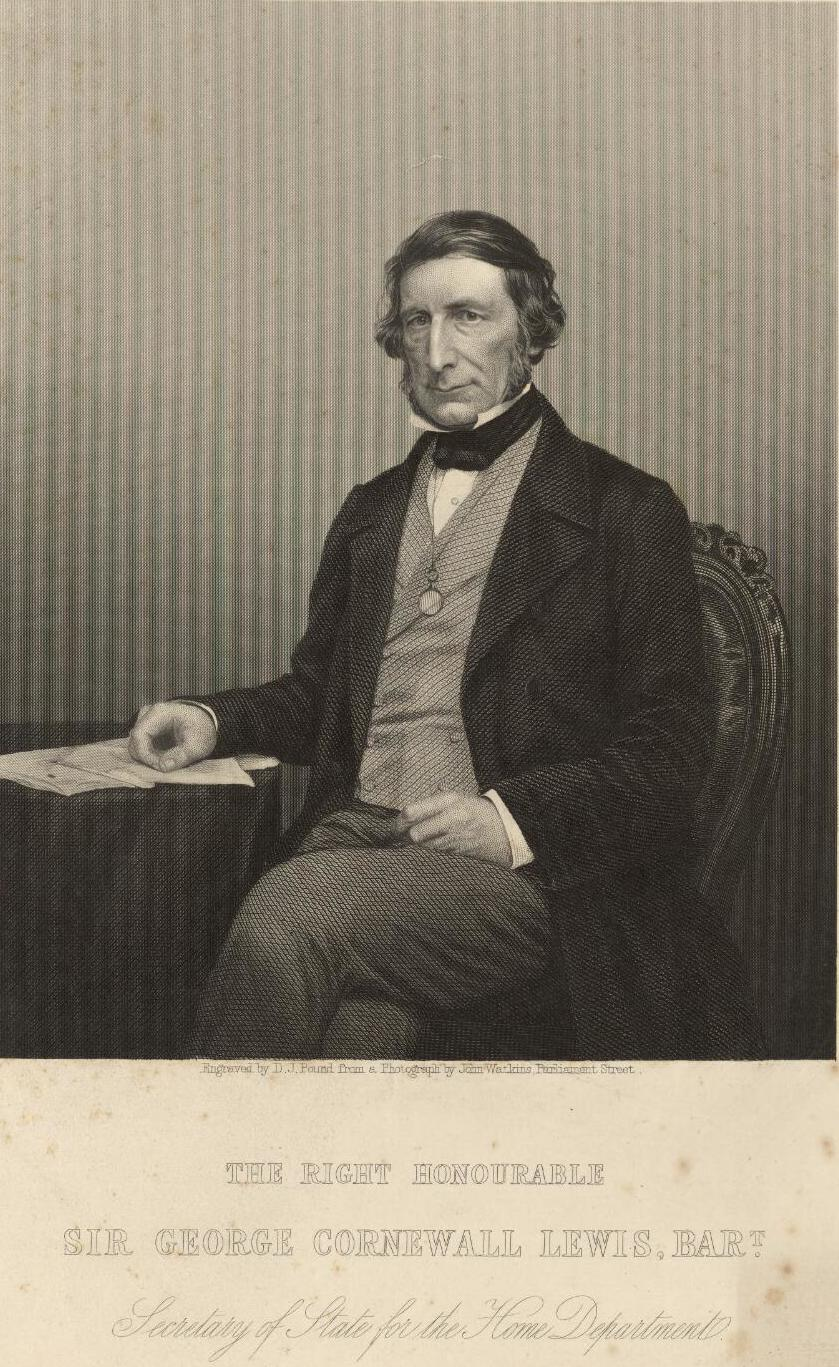
This engraving of George Cornewall Lewis includes The Right Honourable in its caption, reflecting the position he held as a privy counsellor at the time of its creation.

The Right Honourable (abbreviation: The Rt Hon. or variations) is an honorific style traditionally applied to certain persons and collective bodies in the United Kingdom, the former British Empire, and the Commonwealth of Nations. The term is predominantly used today as a style associated with the holding of certain senior public offices in the United Kingdom, Canada, New Zealand, and, to a lesser extent, Australia and Nepal.

Right in this context is an adverb meaning 'very' or 'fully'. Grammatically, The Right Honourable is an adjectival phrase which gives information about a person. As such, it is not considered correct to apply it in direct address, nor to use it on its own as a title in place of a name; but rather it is used in the third person along with a name or noun to be modified. (Note: This is generally the case for all similar adjectival styles (e.g. The Reverend, The Right Excellent). In contrast, styles in the form of a noun (e.g. Majesty, Holiness) can be used with the corresponding possessive pronoun in direct address or in place of a name.)

Right may be abbreviated to Rt, and Honourable to Hon., or both. The is sometimes omitted in written abbreviated form, but is always pronounced.

== Countries with common or current usage ==
=== United Kingdom ===
==== Entitlement ====
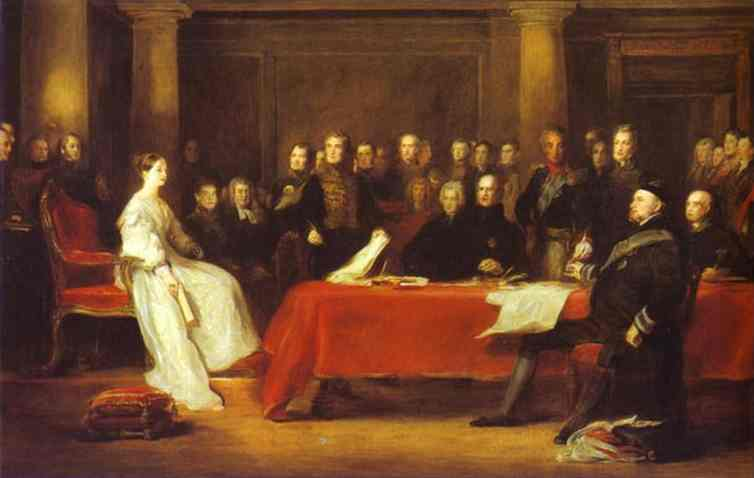
Queen Victoria holding a meeting of her Privy Council. All privy counsellors are styled Right Honourable (unless they are personally entitled to a higher style).

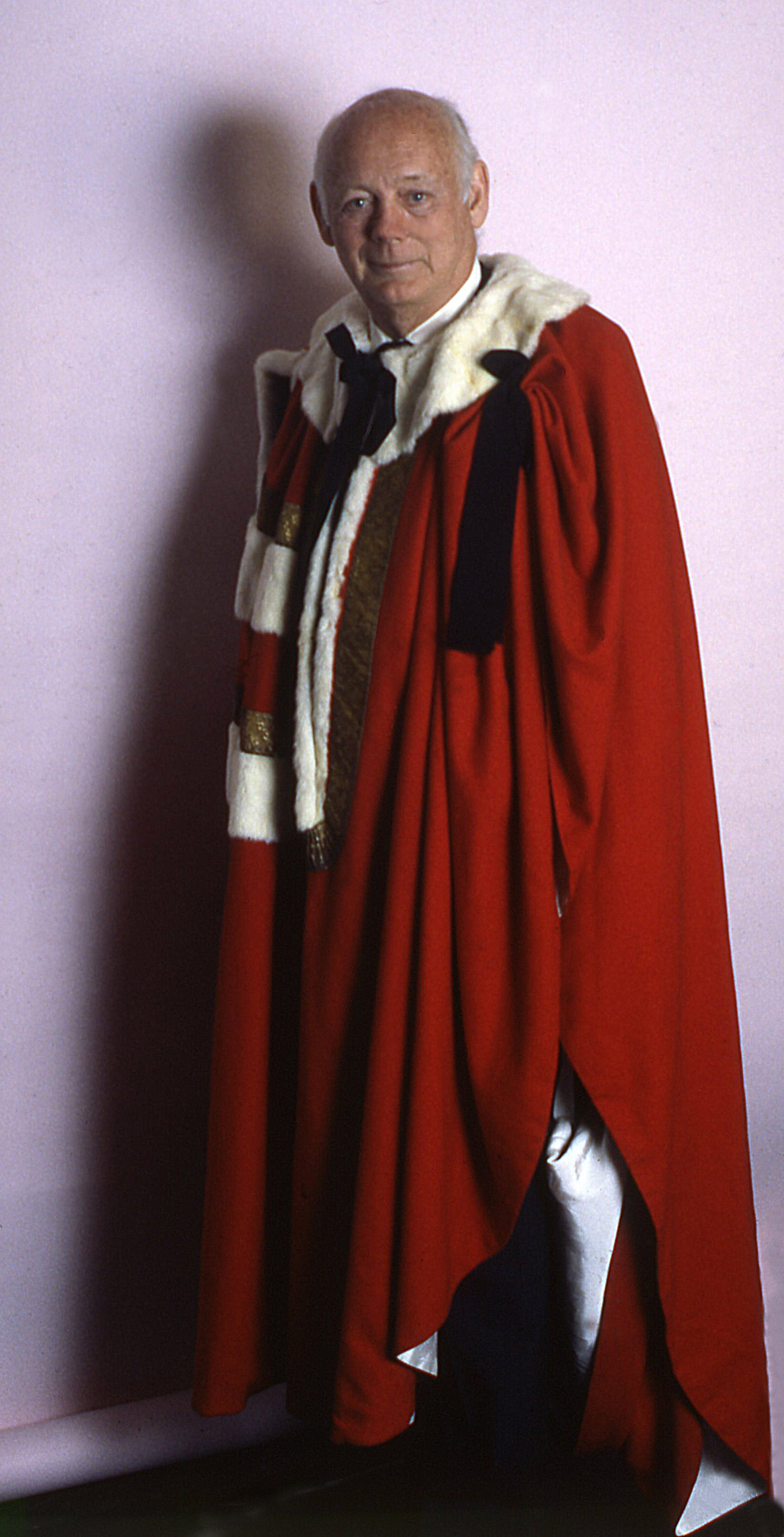
The parliamentary robes of a baron, worn by Lord Montagu of Beaulieu. Peers of the rank of baron, viscount or earl are entitled to the style Right Honourable.

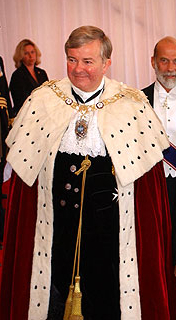
Gavyn Arthur, the 675th Lord Mayor of London, was entitled to be styled "The Right Honourable Lord Mayor of London" during his year in office.

According to the British government, the following persons are entitled to be styled Right Honourable:

Members of the Privy Council
The Privy Council is notionally the body of formal advisers to the sovereign. Members of the Cabinet (including the Prime Minister), senior politicians, and some few other officials are appointed as members for life, and are personally entitled to be styled Right Honourable thereafter.
Peers below the rank of marquess
Earls and countesses, viscounts and viscountesses and barons and baronesses who hold a substantive title (whether hereditary or for life) are personally entitled to the style Right Honourable. A peer's wife or widow also has a legal right to the style of her husband.
The lord mayors and lord provosts of certain cities (ex officio)
The lord mayors of London, Cardiff, Belfast, Bristol and York and the lord provosts of Edinburgh and Glasgow are styled Right Honourable while in office. However, the title is attached to the office, not to the name of the person.

==== Privy counsellors ====
Privy counsellors are appointed by the sovereign on the advice of the prime minister, and remain members for life unless they resign or are expelled. In practice, membership of the privy council is granted to:

- all members of the Cabinet (itself technically a committee of the Privy Council), and certain other senior ministers in the government;
- senior members of the Shadow Cabinet, the leaders of the major political parties in parliament, and the Speaker of the House of Commons;
- the first ministers of Scotland, Wales and Northern Ireland, and the leader of the largest opposition party in the Scottish Parliament;
- the two archbishops of the Church of England, who sit in the House of Lords ex officio;
- senior judges, who fulfil the judicial functions of the Privy Council;
- senior representatives of the Commonwealth nations; and
- senior members of the royal family.

A large proportion of the former and current prominent politicians of the United Kingdom are thus entitled to be styled Right Honourable.

No new appointments have been made to the Privy Council of Northern Ireland since 1971, but surviving appointed members remain entitled to the style. Non-British Commonwealth-citizen judges appointed to the Judicial Committee of the Privy Council are also entitled to the style, although the appellation may be ignored in the judge's home country.

It is the current practice of the House of Lords and the College of Arms to apply the style Right Honourable to privy counsellors only.

==== Peers ====
All holders of a substantive peerage below the rank of marquess are entitled to be styled Right Honourable, (Note: Black's Titles and Forms of Address claims that the capitalised The before substantive peers' titles is an abbreviated form of their style. For example, "The Earl of Beaconsfield" would be short for "The Right Honourable Earl of Beaconsfield". However, this argument does not account for the second The in commonly-found formulations of the kind "The Right Honourable The Earl of Beaconsfield" or "The Most Honourable The Marquess of Salisbury"; and the argument is not corroborated by other guides which recommend the latter forms.) as are their wives and widows. However, a peer's heir who uses a courtesy title is not accorded the corresponding style. Peers above the rank of earl are entitled to different styles: dukes and duchesses are styled The Most Noble or His or Her Grace, and marquesses and marchionesses are styled as The Most Honourable.

In order to differentiate peers who are also members of the Privy Council—and therefore entitled to a style in both capacities—from peers who are not, the post-nominal letters PC can be used to identify the privy counsellors. (Note: This practice is recommended by Debrett's Peerage and Baronetage and Correct Form, and Hickey's Honor and Respect; and is applied consistently throughout Burke's Peerage & Baronetage. However, it is considered incorrect by Black's Titles and Forms of Address, which holds that membership of the Privy Council results in no post-nominal letters because it is an office and not an honour.) This applies to peers of all rank, as a holder of a dukedom or marquessate who becomes a Privy Counsellor retains their higher style and so could not be identified without the letters. In practice, in contexts where there might be confusion, official publications use the style Right Honourable exclusively to identify privy counsellors.

==== Lord mayors, lord provosts and other officers ====
The lord mayors of London, Cardiff, Belfast and York; and the lord provosts of Edinburgh and Glasgow are all entitled to be styled Right Honourable while in office. The lord mayors of Belfast and Cardiff are so entitled by an explicit grant from the sovereign, and the others through ancient custom. The style is used with the name of the office, not the personal name of the office-holder, e.g. "The Right Honourable Lord Mayor of London" or "The Right Honourable the Lord Provost of the City of Edinburgh".

Other lord mayors may be styled Right Worshipful, and other lord provosts do not use a style. By the 1920s, a number of city mayors, including the Lord Mayor of Leeds, were unofficially using the style Right Honourable, and the matter was consequently raised in parliament. The Lord Mayor of Bristol at present still uses the style Right Honourable, without official permission. In guidance issued in June 2003, the Crown Office recommended that the lord provosts of Aberdeen and Dundee be styled Right Honourable in the same manner as those of Edinburgh and Glasgow.

The Chairman of the London County Council (LCC) was granted the style in 1935 as part of the celebrations of the silver jubilee of King George V. The chairman of the Greater London Council (GLC), the body that replaced the LCC in 1965, was similarly granted the style until the GLC was abolished in 1986.

Right Honourable is also used as a style by the Lord Lyon King of Arms in office, preceding his title rather than his personal name, as with other applications ex officio.

==== In the House of Commons ====
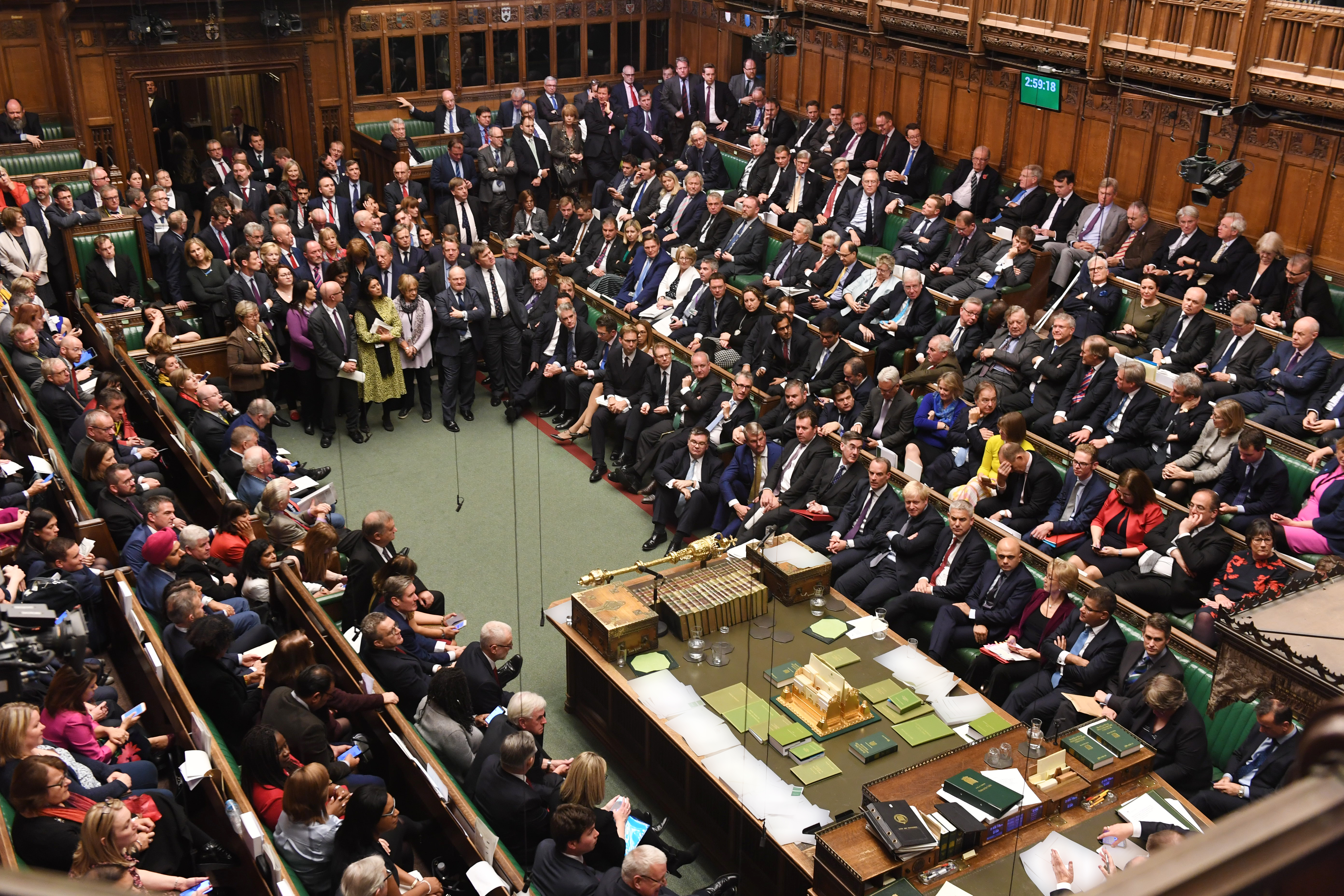
In the House of Commons, members use honourable and right honourable when referring to one another.

In the chamber of the House of Commons, members are not permitted to address each other directly, nor to name other members, but must instead address the speaker and refer to other members indirectly. This practice is intended to enforce a polite tone to maintain order and good honour. Only the occupant of the Chair addresses Members by name. Members generally refer to one another as "my honourable friend" if in the same party, and "the honourable gentleman/lady/member" otherwise. If needed, constituencies ("the honourable member for ...") or ministerial offices (e.g. "my right honourable friend the Prime Minister") can be used for clarity. (Note: In Hansard, references to other MPs are expanded to include a constituency or ministerial office (and name in parentheses) as an aid to readers, whether or not this is what was actually said. Honourable is presently always abbreviated to hon.)

Referring to one another as honourable is merely a courtesy used within the House, and is not a style used outside the chamber. However, when a member is in fact entitled to be styled Right Honourable (in practice always through membership of the Privy Council), they are referred to as such in the chamber. Further embellishments are traditionally applied to clergy (reverend), military officers (gallant) and barristers (learned), a practice recommended to be abolished following a 2010 report of the Modernisation Committee, but in practice continued. In summary:

- "Honourable" is used for members who are not privy counsellors.
- "Right honourable" is used for members who are privy counsellors.
- "(Right) honourable and reverend" may be used for clergy.
- "(Right) honourable and gallant" may be used for military officers.
- "(Right) honourable and learned" may be used for barristers.

==== Collective entities ====
Right Honourable is added as a prefix to the name of various collective entities, including:

- "The Right Honourable the Lords Spiritual and Temporal in Parliament Assembled", i.e. the House of Lords
- "The Right Honourable the Lords of the Privy Council", i.e. the Privy Council
- "The Right Honourable the Lords Commissioners of the Admiralty", i.e. the former Board of Admiralty

=== Canada ===
In Canada, occupants of only the three most senior public offices are styled as Right Honourable (Le/La très honorable in French). Formerly, this was by virtue of their appointment to the Privy Council of the United Kingdom. However, Canadian appointments to the British Privy Council were ended by the government of Lester Pearson. Currently, individuals who hold, or have held, one of the following offices are awarded the style of Right Honourable for life:

- Governor General of Canada
- Prime Minister of Canada
- Chief Justice of Canada

The Right Honourable is not to be confused with His or Her Excellency, used by governors general during their term of office, or the Honourable, used only while in office (except in Nova Scotia, Alberta, Saskatchewan, and Ontario, where honorary members of the Executive Council enjoy the title permanently) by provincial premiers and cabinet ministers, and for life by senators and members of the King's Privy Council for Canada (chiefly cabinet ministers, as well as other figures such as party leaders or provincial premiers who may be appointed from time to time).

The title may also be granted for life by the governor general to eminent Canadians who have not held any of the offices that would otherwise entitle them to the style. This has been done on two occasions: to eight prominent political figures to mark the 125th anniversary of Canadian Confederation in 1992, (Note: Martial Asselin, Ellen Fairclough, Alvin Hamilton, Paul Martin Sr., Don Mazankowski, Jean-Luc Pépin, Jack Pickersgill, and Robert Stanfield.) and to longtime Member of Parliament Herb Gray upon his retirement in 2002.

Living Canadians holding the style The Right Honourable
Person	Birthplace	Office	Born	Granted
Mark Carney	Fort Smith, Northwest Territories	Prime Minister	16 March 1965	14 March 2025
Justin Trudeau	Ottawa, Ontario	Former prime minister	25 December 1971	4 November 2015
Stephen Harper	Toronto, Ontario	Former prime minister	30 April 1959	6 February 2006
Paul Martin	Windsor, Ontario	Former prime minister	28 August 1938	12 December 2003
Jean Chrétien	Shawinigan, Quebec	Former prime minister	11 January 1934	4 November 1993
Kim Campbell	Port Alberni, British Columbia	Former prime minister	10 March 1947	25 June 1993
Joe Clark	High River, Alberta	Former prime minister	5 June 1939	4 June 1979
Louise Arbour	Montreal, Quebec	Governor general	10 February 1947	8 June 2026
Mary Simon	Fort Severight, Quebec	Former governor general	21 August 1947	26 July 2021
Julie Payette	Montreal, Quebec	Former governor general	20 October 1963	2 October 2017
David Johnston	Sudbury, Ontario	Former governor general	28 June 1941	1 October 2010
Michaëlle Jean	Port-au-Prince, Haiti	Former governor general	6 September 1957	27 September 2005
Adrienne Clarkson	Hong Kong	Former governor general	10 February 1939	7 October 1999
Edward Schreyer	Beausejour, Manitoba	Former governor general	21 December 1935	22 January 1979
Richard Wagner	Montreal, Quebec	Chief justice	2 April 1957	18 December 2017
Beverley McLachlin	Pincher Creek, Alberta	Former chief justice	7 September 1943	7 January 2000

Over the years, a number of prominent Canadians became members of the Privy Council of the United Kingdom and thus were entitled to use the style Right Honourable, either because of their services in Britain (e.g. serving as envoys to London) or as members of the Imperial War Cabinet, or due to their prominence in the Canadian Cabinet. These included all but three of Canada's early prime ministers (Alexander Mackenzie, John Abbott, and Mackenzie Bowell), who governed before the title was used domestically.

=== New Zealand ===
Previously in New Zealand the prime minister and some other senior cabinet ministers were customarily appointed to the Privy Council of the United Kingdom and thus styled Right Honourable.

Helen Clark did not recommend the appointment of any new privy counsellors during her tenure as prime minister, from 1999 to 2008. In 2009 it was announced that her successor, John Key, had decided not to make any further recommendations to the Crown for appointments to the Privy Council.

In August 2010, the queen of New Zealand announced that, with immediate effect, individuals who hold, and those persons who after the date of the signing of these rules are appointed to, the following offices are awarded the style Right Honourable for life:

- the Governor-General of New Zealand
- the Prime Minister of New Zealand
- the Chief Justice of New Zealand
- the Speaker of the New Zealand House of Representatives

This change was made because the practice of appointing New Zealanders to the Privy Council of the United Kingdom had ceased. However, the change had little immediate effect, as all but two of the holders or living former holders of the offices granted the style had already been appointed to the Privy Council.

The living New Zealanders holding the style Right Honourable as a result of membership of the Privy Council are:

- Sir Geoffrey Winston Russell Palmer (1985) – prime minister
- Helen Elizabeth Clark (1990) – prime minister
- Sir Donald Charles McKinnon (1992) – deputy prime minister
- Sir Edmund Walter Thomas (1996) – supreme court justice
- Dame Jennifer Mary Shipley (1998) – prime minister
- Winston Raymond Peters (1998) – deputy prime minister
- Sir Douglas Arthur Montrose Graham (1998) – cabinet minister
- Sir Peter Blanchard (1998) – supreme court justice
- Sir Andrew Patrick Charles Tipping (1998) – supreme court justice
- Wyatt Beetham Creech (1998) – deputy prime minister
- Dame Sian Seerpoohi Elias (1999) – chief justice
- Simon David Upton (1999) – cabinet minister

The living New Zealanders holding the style The Right Honourable for life as a result of the 2010 changes are:

Name	Reason	Date Granted
Sir Anand Satyanand	Former governor-general	2 August 2010
Sir John Key	Former prime minister	2 August 2010
Sir Lockwood Smith	Former Speaker of the House of Representatives	2 August 2010
Sir Jerry Mateparae	Former governor-general	31 August 2011
Sir David Carter	Former Speaker of the House of Representatives	31 January 2013
Dame Patsy Reddy	Former governor-general	28 September 2016
Sir Bill English	Former prime minister	12 December 2016
Dame Jacinda Ardern	Former prime minister	26 October 2017
Sir Trevor Mallard	Former Speaker of the House of Representatives	7 November 2017
Dame Helen Winkelmann	Chief Justice	14 March 2019
Dame Cindy Kiro	Governor-general	21 October 2021
Chris Hipkins	Former prime minister	25 January 2023
Christopher Luxon	Prime Minister	27 November 2023
Gerry Brownlee	Speaker of the House of Representatives	5 December 2023

=== Africa ===
During the periods of its existence, the Prime Minister of Kenya post was styled Right Honourable. In post-independence Kenya two people have been styled with the "right honorable" title. The country's founding president Jomo Kenyatta who was the first prime minister of Kenya and Raila Amolo Odinga, who served as the country's second prime minister between 2008 and 2013. The prime ministers of Namibia and Uganda are both currently styled with the same honorific. The speaker and deputy speaker of the Parliament of Uganda are also entitled to the style. In Nigeria, the speakers and former speakers of the National Assembly and the Houses of assembly of Nigerian states are entitled to the honour.

=== Caribbean ===
The prime ministers of Barbados, Grenada, Saint Lucia, Saint Vincent and the Grenadines and Trinidad and Tobago are styled as Right Honourable. The West Indies Federation prime minister was also styled as such during that office's short existence.

==== Antigua and Barbuda ====
In Antigua and Barbuda, governors-general, former governors-general, prime ministers upon the commencement of their fourth term in office, and former prime ministers who have served at least four terms are styled The Right Honourable for life. The governor-general may also on the advice of the prime minister authorize former prime ministers and other distinguished persons to hold the title for life.

=== Malaysia ===
In Malaysia, only the prime minister, his or her deputy, four judges of the Federal Court (Note: The four judges are the chief justice, the president of the Court of Appeal, and the chief judges of the High Court in Malaya and the High Court in Sabah and Sarawak) and MPs who are titled Tun are styled as Right Honourable (Malay: Yang Amat Berhormat, Yang Amat Arif for judges) at the federal level. For the state level, all the Menteris Besar, chief ministers and premier along with their deputies are also styled Right Honourable.

=== Nepal ===
In Nepal, the president, vice president, speaker of the House of Representatives, prime minister and chief justice are formally styled Right Honourable (Nepali: सम्माननीय, romanized: Sammānanīya). Ministers, members of parliament (Lower and Upper Houses and provincial parliaments) and chief ministers of provinces are styled "Honourable" only. It is usually joked during informal discussions about the use of the word "Honourable" to differentiate senior and less senior government dignitories. It can also be spelled in English as The Rt. Hon’ble.

=== South Korea ===
In South Korea, the President, Prime Minister, Speaker of the National Assembly and Chief Justice can use the Right Honourable style.

=== Spain ===
In the Spanish autonomous community of Catalonia, the president of the Generalitat de Catalunya and the president of the Parliament of Catalonia are formally referred as the Right Honourable.

== Countries with rare or historic usage ==
=== Australia ===
In Australia, the lord mayors of Adelaide, Brisbane, Hobart, Melbourne, Perth and Sydney are entitled to be styled Right Honourable while in office.

Historically, a number of Australians were entitled to the style as members of the Privy Council of the United Kingdom. Appointment to the Australian equivalent of the Privy Council, the Federal Executive Council, does not entitle a person to the style. Typical appointees to the Imperial Privy Council included senior politicians and judges at state and federal level. Malcolm Fraser in 1976 was the most recent prime minister to accept appointment to the Privy Council and thus to be styled Right Honourable. Of his 21 predecessors, only four were not members of the Privy Council – Alfred Deakin (declined appointment), Chris Watson (never offered), Arthur Fadden (accepted after leaving office), and Gough Whitlam (declined appointment). The last governor-general to be entitled to the style was Sir Ninian Stephen, who left office in 1988. The last active politician to be entitled to the style was Ian Sinclair, who retired in 1998. The few Australian recipients of British peerages were also entitled to the style.

Present-day Australian governments no longer recommend Australians for elevation to the peerage or appointment to the Privy Council. However, some present-day Australian citizens either hold hereditary peerages (e.g. Malcolm Murray, 12th Earl of Dunmore) or obtained the style another way (e.g. Ian Sinclair).

Living Australians holding the style The Right Honourable	Reason	Formerly
Ian Sinclair, AC	Member of the Privy Council of the United Kingdom	Former Speaker of the Australian House of Representatives
Malcolm Murray, 12th Earl of Dunmore	Earl of Dunmore	Former Member of the House of Lords
Robert Fiennes-Clinton, 19th Earl of Lincoln	Earl of Lincoln	
Simon Abney-Hastings, 15th Earl of Loudoun	Earl of Loudoun	
George Dawson-Damer, 7th Earl of Portarlington	Earl of Portarlington	
Keith Rous, 6th Earl of Stradbroke	Earl of Stradbroke	
Francis Grosvenor, 8th Earl of Wilton	Earl of Wilton	
Nicholas St John, 9th Viscount Bolingbroke, 10th Viscount St John	Viscount Bolingbroke	
Charles Cavendish, 7th Baron Chesham	Baron Chesham	
James Lindsay, 3rd Baron Lindsay of Birker	Baron Lindsay of Birker	
David Campbell, 7th Baron Stratheden and Campbell	Baron Stratheden	
David Baden-Powell, 5th Baron Baden-Powell	Baron Baden-Powell	

=== Ireland ===
Members of the Privy Council of Ireland were entitled to be styled Right Honourable, even after the Privy Council ceased to have any functions or to meet on the creation of the Irish Free State in December 1922. Nevertheless, the Lord Mayor of Dublin, like some of his counterparts in Great Britain, retained the use of the honorific style as a result of its having been conferred separately by legislation; in 2001 it was removed, as a consequence of local government law reform.

=== Sri Lanka ===
In Sri Lanka (formerly known as Ceylon) the British practice was followed with Ceylonese members of the Privy Council of the United Kingdom were styled Right Honourable and were referred to as Mahamanya in Sinhala. Ceylonese appointees to the privy council included D. S. Senanayake and Sir John Kotelawala.

== See also ==
- The Honourable
- The Much Honoured
- The Most Honourable
- Style (manner of address)
