= Coleg Harlech =

College in Harlech, Gwynedd, Mid Wales

Coordinates: 52.8559°N 4.1130°W

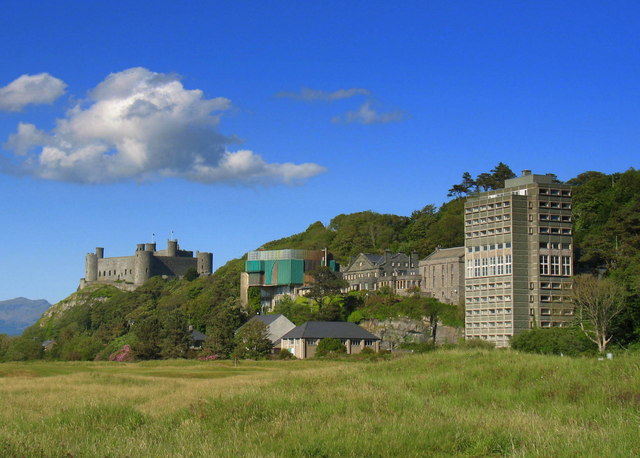
Coleg Harlech with the attached Theatr Ardudwy

Coleg Harlech was a residential adult education college for mature students in Harlech, Gwynedd, Mid Wales, later a part of Adult Learning Wales - Addysg Oedolion Cymru.

== History ==
Coleg Harlech was Wales' only long-term, mature-student residential education college. It was established in 1927 by Thomas Jones (Deputy Secretary to the Cabinet under four prime ministers including David Lloyd George and Stanley Baldwin) to continue the work of Workers' Educational Association in a residential environment. Ben Bowen Thomas was the first warden, with other early staff including Lily Pincus. Plas Wernfawr was acquired at a knock-down price from a seller sympathetic to the project to be the base for the college.

Starting with just six students, mostly from the South Wales Coalfield area, numbers increased to 30 in the 1930s, 70 in the 1960s, serving the whole of Wales. Then, with Ieuan Jeffries-Jones as warden, Coleg Harlech began offering a two-year diploma course validated by the University of Wales, which became a preparation for university education for those who had missed out on earlier education. Coleg Harlech became well known as a second chance college, often for people who, for economic or social reasons, never had a first chance.

By the 1980s and 1990s, higher education institutions generally were growing, and expanding access opportunities wider than before. This began to threaten Coleg Harlech’s niche, and ultimately Coleg Harlech, once funded as a unique institution in Wales, came under the funding regime with other further education colleges, and became less distinctive.

Coleg Harlech always had a close association with the WEA and merged with WEA (North Wales) in 2001 to become Coleg Harlech Workers' Educational Association North Wales (CHWEAN); CHWEAN subsequently evolved via two further mergers into Adult Learning Wales, which operated the site until its sale in 2019.

The college's residential students were once supported financially by bursaries from the Welsh Government, previously the Welsh Office, but as access to higher and further education widened and the college's provision became less distinctive, these came to an end, in effect bringing about the termination of residential courses.

=== Closure and after ===
In February 2017 it was announced that Coleg Harlech would be closing as an adult education site at the end of the academic year. It was sold to local businessman Leslie Banks Irvine in April 2019, but then put on sale again in September that year as four properties with a total asking price of around £630,000.

In 2021 a petition to the Welsh Government stating "The Welsh Government should re-purchase and refurbish Coleg Harlech" gained 6,666 signatures.

In around February 2022, the Welsh Government approved some funding for emergency works to protect the buildings.

=== Name ===
The institution has always been named, simply, Coleg Harlech: there is no English version of the name even though it translates as Harlech College.

== Buildings ==
=== Plas Wernfawr ===
The campus is centred on Plas Wernfawr, a house originally built in 1907–08 for George Davison, and designed in the Arts and Crafts style by the radical architect George Henry Walton. The building is in simple classical style, built of dressed blocks of local grey stone. The east front demonstrates strong horizontal lines, formed by two rows of sash windows, a projecting dentilated string course at eaves height forming the base of a pediment which contains a central oculus. Walton also laid out the garden. After it became Coleg Harlech, a library wing was added, designed by local architect Griffith Morris in an Art Deco style. Plas Wernfawr, together with the terraces revetment walls of the garden on the seaward side is a Grade II* listed building. The forecourt and garden structures on the inland side are listed Grade II.

=== Art collection ===
Plas Wernfawr once held a collection of artworks which had been donated or purchased by the college over the years. However, a financial crisis at the college in 2013 forced the sale of these artefacts and many rare books from the college library.

=== Theatre ===
The Great Hall, part of Walton's original design, was destroyed by fire in 1968. It was replaced by a brutalist theatre building, designed by Gerald Latter for Colwyn Foulkes & Partners. The theatre building was opened as Theatr Ardudwy in 1973 but subsequently changed its name to Theatr Harlech. It was operated by a separate body from the college until the Coleg closed its doors to learners in 2017. It is considered by The Twentieth Century Society to be a building at risk, along with the college's 12-storey residential tower, also designed by Latter in 1968.

It was reported in 2021 that the theatre "could be set to reopen", after previous reports of police investigations into earlier plans.

In 2025 the South Wales Building Preservation Trust was awarded £8000 for a survey to assess what was needed to bring it up to modern standards and back into community use.

=== Other buildings ===
The campus also includes a gymnasium built c.1970 to designs by Colwyn Foulkes and an Amenity Centre, designed in 1985 by the Percy Thomas Partnership. Other buildings including a concrete tower block once used for accommodation and Wern Fach, once the Warden's residence.
