= Richard Rolfe =

Former headteacher of Le Rocquier School, Jersey

Richard Rolfe is the former headteacher of Le Rocquier School, Jersey. He was appointed in 2003* and has been credited with turning around the school after the school was singled out for criticism in a report about problem children by UK education expert Kathie Bull*.

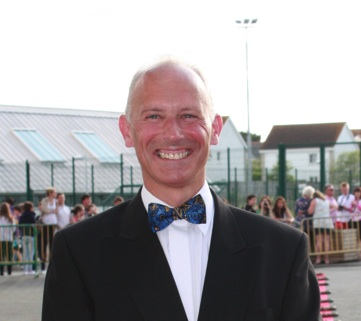
Richard Rolfe at Le Rocquier School Prom

He succeeded Geoff Smith who was headteacher for 2 terms*. During his tenure Richard Rolfe paid off the budget deficit, increased student numbers from a low of 695 to a high of 915 and project managed a complete rebuild of the school*. The project cost £27 million and was designed to deliver a school able to accommodate 900 children which earned him praise from the Jersey business community. He was also praised in The States’ Parliament for the high quality of his leadership ( see Hansard section 5.1).

The school won a number of awards during his time at the school including twice winning Investors in People at the highest level seen in the Channel Islands 2007 and 2011. In addition the school won The Jersey Enterprise award for training and developing staff.

In 2010 Richard contracted bladder cancer for which he was treated.

In 2011 he won the Jersey Director of the Year Award for the public sector and went on to win the overall Institute of Directors Award in the UK. The award was presented to him by former politician Michael Portillo. During the same year he was runner up at for "Teacher of the Year Awards".

In October 2011 he decided to leave Le Rocquier to concentrate on his recovery from cancer.

Since leaving Le Rocquier Richard Rolfe has authored a number of books including Personal Branding, The Negotiation Expert and The Trouble with Teenagers and spoken at a number of public events and trained a number of public and private sector organisations including the Police.

In 2014 Richard teamed up with one of his former students to establish National Coding Week with the aim of getting adults involved in learning digital skills. Richard trained politicians to give them an understanding of coding and how important it is to the economy. As part of this coding initiative they helped train unemployed people in digital skills. Many of the participants gained employment via this initiative. The initiative was later extended to those with autism. In 2015 Richard established a business brand called White Collar Coding. This training was aimed at improving the digital skills and digital literacy of business leaders

From 2014 to 2021 Richard has continued to run National Coding Week as a volunteer-led organisation.

== Bibliography ==
- Richard Rolfe Personal Branding for Virgins 26 May 2011
- Richard Rolfe The Negotiation Expert 8 October 2011 ISBN 978-1475159257
- Richard Rolfe The Trouble with Teenagers 1 March 2012 ISBN 1475159250
