= James Lindsay, 3rd Baron Lindsay of Birker =

Australian diplomat

James Francis Lindsay, 3rd Baron Lindsay of Birker (born 29 January 1945), is an Australian former diplomat.

== Background and education ==
Lindsay is the only son of Michael Lindsay, 2nd Baron Lindsay of Birker, and his wife, Hsiao Li. He was born in a hospital cave in Yenan while his parents, supporters of Chinese communist resistance fighters, were fleeing the Japanese. He was the grandson of the Scottish academic and educationalist Sandie Lindsay, 1st Baron Lindsay of Birker. He was educated at the University of Keele and the University of Liverpool, and worked as a lecturer in physics at Tunghai University, Taichung, Taiwan, between 1967 and 1968, and as an exploration geophysicist in Darwin, Australia, between 1969 and 1970.

== Diplomatic career ==
In 1972, Lindsay entered the Australian Foreign Service and was posted in Chile between 1973 and 1976, in Laos between 1980 and 1981, in Bangladesh between 1982 and 1984 and in Venezuela between 1987 and 1990. In 1993 he was appointed Deputy High Commissioner to Pakistan, a post he held until 1996, and was then Deputy High Commissioner to Kenya between 1996 and 2000. He was also Deputy Permanent Representative for Australia to the United Nations Environment Programme from 1996 to 2000. Lindsay succeeded his father in the barony in 1994 and took his seat in the House of Lords in July the following year. However, he lost his seat in parliament after the passing of the House of Lords Act 1999.

== Personal life ==
Lord Lindsay of Birker married firstly Mary Rose, daughter of W. G. Thomas, in 1969. They had no children and were divorced in 1985. He married secondly Pamela Collett, daughter of Lon Hutchison, in 2000. This marriage is also childless.

He published in 2007 his mother's autobiography : Bold Plum

The book was accompanied by a video interview and documentary narrated by James Lindsay

Peerage of the United Kingdom
Preceded by Michael Lindsay	Baron Lindsay of Birker; 1994–present Member of the House of Lords (1994–1999)	Incumbent; Heir presumptive: Alexander Lindsay
