= Thomas Jones (civil servant) =

Welsh civil servant (1870–1955)

- Bust by Siegfried Charoux

Deputy Secretary to the Cabinet
- In office 1916–1935
- Prime Minister: David Lloyd George; Bonar Law; Stanley Baldwin; Ramsay MacDonald

President of the University College of Wales Aberystwyth
- In office 1944–1954
- Preceded by: Edmund Davies
- Succeeded by: Sir David Hughes Parry

Personal details
- Born: 27 September 1870
- Died: 15 October 1955 (aged 85) London

Thomas Jones, CH (27 September 1870 – 15 October 1955) was a British civil servant and educationalist, once described as "one of the six most important men in Europe", and also as "the King of Wales" and "keeper of a thousand secrets". Jones served as Deputy Secretary to the Cabinet for nearly twenty years, under four different Prime Ministers.

== Early life ==
Thomas Jones was born on 27 September 1870, at 100 High Street, Rhymney, Monmouthshire. He was the first of nine children to David Benjamin Jones and Mary Ann Jones. His family was Welsh speaking but by the time he was school age, the family usually spoke English except for Sunday School and the chapel. Welsh was banned at school and Jones later wrote that "outside the chapel, I never had a lesson in Welsh". His fluency in Welsh in later life was hindered by this but his command of English was excellent. He was educated at the Upper Rhymney School and Lewis School in Pengam. Jones had failed to win a scholarship at Lewis but his father could afford the school fee.

Jones's grandfather insisted on his leaving school at 14 to work as a clerk in the local ironworks. Jones complied but his interest in reading and his facility in public speaking brought him fame as a preacher. In 1890 he won the Calvinist Methodist scripture gold medal and proceeded to the University College of Wales at Aberystwyth to study for the ministry. New interests intervened, however; and Jones eventually graduated with first-class honours in economics from the University of Glasgow in 1901.

In 1902 he married a student from his time at Aberystwyth, Eirene Theodora Lloyd (1875–1935), daughter of Dr Richard John Lloyd, Reader in Phonetics at Liverpool University. There were three children from the marriage: Eirene White (1909–99), who became a Labour Minister under Harold Wilson (1966–70), Tristan (1913–90), who became managing director of The Observer, and Elphin, who died in a motoring accident in 1928.

Jones pursued at first an academic career after graduation from Glasgow. He was Russell Student at the London School of Economics; Barrington Lecturer in Ireland (1904–05); Assistant to the Professor of Political Economy and Lecturer in Economics at Glasgow; and Professor of Economics, Queen's University Belfast, 1909–10.

In 1914 Jones started the monthly journal Welsh Outlook to promote "national social progress" in Wales. He was the journal's de facto editor for its first three years.

== Civil service ==
He became familiarly known as "T.J." He was Deputy Secretary to the Cabinet under four Prime Ministers: David Lloyd George, Bonar Law, Stanley Baldwin and Ramsay MacDonald. His 3-volume Whitehall Diary (1969, 1971) threw much light on politics "behind the scenes", including the Irish Treaty, the 1926 General Strike, the Cliveden Set, and so on.

When Baldwin became Prime Minister in 1923, he decided to retain Jones as Deputy Secretary, telling him on the day he was appointed Premier: "I shall want you to hold my hand, Tom". Baldwin appreciated Jones' value and they would remain friends for more than twenty years. During their first serious meeting, Baldwin expressed concern about the effects on Britain's commerce from the economic troubles in Europe. Jones immediately focused the conversation on to the social consequences. Baldwin told Jones in 1929:

I am a Tory P.M., surrounded with a Tory Cabinet, moving in Tory circles. You don't let me forget or ignore the whole range of ideas that normally I should never be brought up against if you were not in and out of this room. You supply the radium...you have such an extraordinary width of friendships in all classes, and so many interests that through you I do gather impressions of what is being thought by a number of significant people whose minds I should not know, at any rate so well, but for your help. I think every Tory P.M. ought to have someone like you about the place.

A friend of many rich and influential people including the Astors, Jones excelled at extracting money from rich people for worthwhile causes, notably adult education: he founded Coleg Harlech in Gwynedd in 1927, was secretary, trustee and chairman of the Pilgrim Trust from 1930, and was instrumental in the founding of Newbattle Abbey College in Midlothian in 1937.

His contacts were useful in other situations too: for example, it was he who introduced Gareth Jones, subject of the 2019 film Mr Jones, to Lloyd George.

== Later life ==
He was Chairman of Gregynog Press throughout its existence, and also helped set up CEMA, the Committee for the Encouragement of Music and the Arts (forerunner of the Arts Council) as well as the Army Bureau of Current Affairs (designed to 'supply mental stimulant' to British troops during the Second World War). From 1917 to 1933 he was the Chairman of the Romney Street Group, a think tank formed to generate policies for the post-war reconstruction of Britain.

Jones wrote the Dictionary of National Biography entries for three Prime Ministers: Lloyd George, Bonar Law and Baldwin.

Towards the end of his life Jones became President of the University of Wales, Aberystwyth, and was awarded the Gold Medal of the Honourable Society of Cymmrodorion, as well as finally agreeing to become a Member of the Order of the Companions of Honour.

He died in London on 15 October 1955.

Jones's daughter, Eirene White, became a Labour politician and minister.

== Assessment ==
His biographer, Dr E. L. Ellis, claimed that Jones was invaluable to Lloyd George in dealing with the trade unions and the Irish Question, along with dissuading Baldwin from taking revenge in the aftermath of the General Strike. He "was on the side of light...A passionate belief in moderation and compromise" was central to Jones. Ellis also claims that Jones's philanthropy was matchless amongst his contemporaries: "he was the incarnation of public-spiritedness". Ellis called Jones, with Lloyd George and Aneurin Bevan, "the three greatest Welshmen in public life" in the twentieth century. The military historian Correlli Barnett in his history of Britain's international relations in the interwar period, called Jones "a man of simplicity and naivete remarkable in politics even for that age".

== Works ==
- A Theme with Variations (1933)
- Rhymney Memories (1938)
- Cerrig Milltir (1942)
- Leeks and Daffodils (1942)
- The Native Never Returns (1946)
- Welsh Broth (1950)
- Lloyd George (1951)
- The Gregynog Press (1954)
- A Diary with Letters 1931–1950 (1954)
- Whitehall Diaries, Vol I and II (1969)
- Whitehall Diaries, Vol III (1971)

== Offices held ==
Academic offices
Preceded by Edmund Davies, Baron Edmund-Davies	President of the University College of Wales Aberystwyth; 1944–1954	Succeeded by Sir David Hughes Parry
