= Sandie Lindsay, 1st Baron Lindsay of Birker =

British philosopher (1879–1952)

The Right Honourable Lord Lindsay of Birker CBE

Principal of Keele University
- In office 1949–1952
- Succeeded by: Sir John Lennard-Jones

Vice-Chancellor of Oxford University
- In office 1935–1938
- Preceded by: Francis John Lys
- Succeeded by: Sir John Lennard-Jones

Personal details
- Born: Alexander Dunlop Lindsay; 14 May 1879 Glasgow, Scotland
- Died: 18 March 1952 (aged 72)
- Party: Popular Front
- Education: University of Glasgow; University College, Oxford

Alexander Dunlop Lindsay, 1st Baron Lindsay of Birker (14 May 1879 – 18 March 1952), known as Sandie Lindsay, was a Scottish academic and peer.

Lindsay worked at a number of universities, beginning as a fellow in moral philosophy at the University of Edinburgh and as an assistant lecturer at Victoria University of Manchester. He then moved to Balliol College, Oxford where he had been elected a fellow in 1906. He served in the British Army during the First World War. He was Professor of Moral Philosophy at the University of Glasgow from 1922 to 1924, before returning to Balliol College. He also served as the Vice-chancellor of the University of Oxford from 1935 to 1938. Having retired from Oxford in 1949, he became the first principal of the 'University College of North Staffordshire', which became Keele University.

Lindsay had unsuccessfully stood for election to the House of Commons in the 1938 Oxford by-election, as an independent candidate opposed to the Munich Agreement. He was, however, made a baron on 13 November 1945, and thereby sat as a peer in the House of Lords.

== Early life ==
Lindsay was born in Glasgow on 14 May 1879, the son of Anna and Thomas Martin Lindsay. He was educated from 1887 at the Glasgow Academy, then at the University of Glasgow, where he gained a Master of Arts degree in 1899, and finally at University College, Oxford, where he took a Double First in 1902.

== Career ==
In 1903 Lindsay won the 'Shaw Fellowship' in moral philosophy at the University of Edinburgh, as had his father, who was the first recipient of the award. In the October of the following year he obntained a post as an assistant lecturer in philosophy at the Victoria University of Manchester. However, by the following March he had applied for a tutorial fellowship in Balliol College, Oxford, which was finally offered to him in the following September. Consequently in 1906 Lindsay returned to Balliol College as a fellow and tutor in philosophy. In 1910 he was appointed as 'Jowett Lecturer in Philosophy', which included the chief responsibility for the teaching of philosophy in the college. From the latter part of the First World War, 1917, and afterwards to 1919, he acted as 'Deputy Controller of Labour' in France, during which he became a Lieutenant-colonel; he received a CBE (Military) and he was mentioned in dispatches.

From 1922 to 1924, Lindsay was Professor of Moral Philosophy at the University of Glasgow. From 1924 to 1925, he was president of the Aristotelian Society. In 1924 he became master of Balliol College and became vice-chancellor of the University of Oxford from 1935 to 1938. He worked with Lord Nuffield who in 1937 donated £900,000 to fund the creation of a postgraduate college, Nuffield College, Oxford.

At Oxford, Lindsay was a leading figure in the Adult Education Movement.

In 1938, Lindsay stood for Parliament in the Oxford by-election as an 'Independent Progressive' on the single issue of opposition to the Munich Agreement, with support from the Labour and Liberal parties as well as from many Conservatives including the future Prime Ministers Winston Churchill, Harold Macmillan, and Edward Heath, and the President of the Oxford Union, Alan Wood, but lost to the official Conservative candidate, Quintin Hogg.

In 1949, upon his retirement from Balliol, Lindsay became the Founding Principal of the 'University College of North Staffordshire', which opened at Keele Hall in 1950. This unique institution - the first UK university of the 20th Century - tested many of Lindsay's educational principles and reflected the post-war idealism of its day. Known by many as the "Keele Experiment", many of the features of the new universities of the 1960s were tested at Keele. The University College became the University of Keele in 1962.

== Personal life ==
Lindsay married Erica Violet Storr (1877 – 28 May 1962), daughter of Francis Storr, in 1907 and they had one daughter and two sons. He was elevated to the peerage on 13 November 1945 as Baron Lindsay of Birker, of Low Ground in the County of Cumberland. He was introduced to the House of Lords on 5 December 1945. He was succeeded in the barony by his eldest son Michael Francis Morris Lindsay.

== Selected bibliography ==
- Socratic Discourses with an Introduction by A. D. Lindsay (1910)
- Berkeley's A New Theory of Vision and Other Select Philosophical Writings with an Introduction by A. D. Lindsay (1910)
- The Philosophy of Bergson (1911)
- Five Dialogues of Plato, bearing on Poetic Inspiration with an Introduction by A. D. Lindsay (1913)
- Mill's Utilitarianism, Liberty & Representative Government with an Introduction by A. D. Lindsay (1914)
- The Republic of Plato translated by A. D. Lindsay (1923)
- Karl Marx's Capital an introductory essay (1925)
- The Nature of Religious Truth: Sermons Preached in Balliol College Chapel (1927)
- Kant, Ernest Benn Limited / Oxford University Press, 1934. 1970 edition, Folcroft Press. ASIN: B0006C6R8G
- The Two Moralities (1940)

== Notes ==
Academic offices
Preceded by Arthur Lionel Smith	Master of Balliol College, Oxford; 1924–1949	Succeeded by David Lindsay Keir
Preceded by Francis John Lys	Vice-Chancellor of Oxford University; 1935–1938	Succeeded by George Stuart Gordon
Preceded by New Creation	Principal, University College of North Staffordshire (now Keele University); 1949–1952	Succeeded by Sir John Lennard-Jones
Peerage of the United Kingdom
New creation	Baron Lindsay of Birker; 1945–1952	Succeeded by Michael Lindsay
