= Baron Lindsay of Birker =

Barony in the Peerage of the United Kingdom

Baron Lindsay of Birker, of Low Ground in the County of Cumberland, is a title in the Peerage of the United Kingdom. It was created on 13 November 1945 for the Scottish academic and educationalist, Sandie Lindsay. His eldest son, the second Baron, was Professor of Far Eastern Studies at the American University in Washington, D.C. The second Baron's wife, Hsiao Li, was the first Chinese-born peeress. As of 2010 the title is held by the second Baron's only son, the third Baron, who succeeded in 1994. He is an Australian citizen and diplomat. Lord Lindsay has notably served as Deputy Australian High Commissioner to Pakistan and Kenya.

== Barons Lindsay of Birker (1945) ==
- Alexander Dunlop "Sandie" Lindsay, 1st Baron Lindsay of Birker (1879–1952)
- Michael Francis Morris Lindsay, 2nd Baron Lindsay of Birker (1909–1994)
- James Francis Lindsay, 3rd Baron Lindsay of Birker (b. 1945)

The heir presumptive is the present holder's first cousin once removed Simon Alexander Lindsay (b. 1963). He is the grandson of Major Thomas Martin Lindsay, brother of the second Baron.
