= Frances Mansbridge =

Frances Jane Mansbridge (née Pringle; 19 September 1875 – 24 July 1958) was a British educationist who co-founded the Workers' Educational Association (WEA) with her husband, Albert Mansbridge (1876–1952).

== Biography ==
Frances Jane Pringle was born in Cape Town to John, a clerk born in Ireland, and Frances Soper Pringle, from Southampton. The family returned to Hampshire, England, when she was small. She became engaged to Albert Mansbridge when they were both Sunday school teachers. In July 1900, in St Mark's Church in the Parish of Battersea in Wandsworth, London, she and Albert were married by Canon Charles Gore.

Together with friends, Albert and Frances formed the Christian Economics Society. On 16 May 1903, Frances and Albert founded an association to promote the Higher Education of Working Men, which became the Workers' Educational Association (WEA) in 1905, using two shillings and sixpence from the housekeeping money.

In 1907, the WEA convened a women's group which developed into the Women's Advisory Committee; the members including Frances Mansbridge, Maude Royden and Margaret MacDonald.

In 1945, the couple went into semi-retirement at Paignton, Devon. Frances died in 1958 in Ealing, London, aged 82.

== Travel ==
In September 1910 the Mansbridge family visited Mediterranean Ports on a seven-week voyage on a small tramp steamer with Albert as Purser, Frances as Stewardess and their son as honorary Assistant Purser.

Albert and Frances arrived in Australia on 8 July 1913 on a seventeen-week mission aimed at forming branches of the association in New South Wales, Queensland, Victoria, South Australia, Western Australia and Tasmania, followed by New Zealand during a two-day visit.

Leading up to and during World War I Frances administered the WEA Comradeship Fund which helped people who were experiencing hard times.

In December 1925 on a lecture tour with Albert to Canada and the US, Frances was persuaded to lecture, mainly to women's groups, and in 1929 Frances delivered speeches when they were in Newfoundland.

== Family ==
Their son, as John Mansbridge, became an artist and painted portraits of Charles Gore, his father and many others. He designed posters for the Underground Group and London Transport and he was an official World War II War Artist and worked to develop camouflage. In 1947 he was a founder member of the Blackheath Art Society. In the 1970s John was the Architecture tutor at the Barnet Branch of the WEA. He wrote The Graphic History of Architecture and illustrated The Story of the First Christmas Morning written by Minnie Lake. He became Head of Fine Art at Goldsmiths College and died in 1981.

== Commendations ==
Albert recognised that without Tot, his pet name for Frances, he could never have achieved his successes. Linda Reeves, a great niece of Albert, remembers them as Aunt Tot and Uncle Bert when she was taken to visit them at High Wycombe. She stated "His wife Frances must have been as dynamic as he. She helped him set up the WEA and also lectured abroad."
