= Welsh Outlook =

Monthly magazine published

The Welsh Outlook was a monthly magazine published from 1914 to 1933 in Wales, articulating a political viewpoint of progressive liberalism and cultural nationalism. Its first editor was Thomas Jones and the publication was funded by David Davies, 1st Baron Davies.

The magazine was intended by Jones to provide a platform to discuss critically the changes in Welsh society of the time, while aiming for social progress. Its contributors and editorial team were drawn largely from Cardiff and South Wales. Although influential among the governing elite in Wales, it achieved sales of only 2,000, dropping markedly in the 1930s.

The title (without an initial 'The') was revived by David Hewitt in 1965 when he launched a new magazine that aimed to "serve as a catalyst for public discussion throughout the country." The magazine ceased publication after three monthly issues

The original magazine is important to the development of Welsh nationalism since it reflected a move away from religious and linguistic identity and attempted to define a role for the Welsh language and Welsh nationalism in the context of internationalism and modern society, even if from a conservative stance. The magazine has been digitised by the National Library of Wales as part the Welsh Journals Online project.
