= David Thomas (educationalist) =

Welsh educationalist and political organizer (1880–1967)

David Thomas (16 July 1880 – 27 June 1967) was a Welsh educationalist, Welsh language writer and Labour Party pioneer in Wales. Born in Llanfechain, Montgomeryshire, he taught mainly in Wales, initially as a non-certificated teacher, but he obtained a teacher's certificate in 1905. Thomas was active in the Labour Party and labour movement in North Wales. His first book, Y Werin a'i Theyrnas (The People and Their Kingdom, 1910), was influential on trade unionists and Welsh Labour members.

== Family and teaching ==
Thomas was the son of David Thomas, a mason and farmer, and his wife Elizabeth (née Jones) of Llanfechain. He attended school there and in Llanfyllin and Oswestry, before starting work in a Llanfyllin draper's shop. As a conscientious objector, Thomas spent the First World War working on a farm at Bersham, near Wrexham. On 19 July 1919, he married Elizabeth Ann Williams (died 1955) of New Broughton, Wrexham, with whom he had a son (Arial M. Thomas) and a daughter. He died at his daughter's house at 2 Pen-y-bryn, Burry Port, outside Llanelli on 27 June 1967.

Thomas spent the years 1895–1899 as a pupil-teacher at the British School in Llanfyllin and then took up uncertified teaching at Pen-sarn, near Amlwch, Anglesey, at Bridgend, Glamorganshire, and at Walton-on-Thames, Surrey. He obtained a teacher's certificate in 1905 after attending classes in London, and taught further at Cradley, Herefordshire, in Nantlle Valley, Caernarfonshire (1905–1920), and at Bangor Central School (1922–1945).

== Political work ==
For two post-war years (1920–1922) David Thomas acted as secretary of North Wales Labour Council. His political energies went into establishing trade unionism and Independent Labour Party branches in North Wales. He had already helped to found Caernarfonshire Labour Council in 1912 and the North Wales Labour Council in 1914.

Thomas began contributing to political debate in Yr Herald Cymraeg in 1908. His book Y Werin a'i Theyrnas influenced many. His dissertation A study of a rural and maritime community in the nineteenth century, with special reference to the relation between agriculture and shipping won him an MA from the University of Liverpool in 1928). He received an honorary MA degree from the University of Wales in 1960.

Another concern of his was adult education. He was a tutor for the Workers' Educational Association (WEA) in Caernarfonshire from 1928 to 1959, and instigated the founding of Lleufer as a WEA periodical, which he edited it until 1965.

Thomas was an effective public speaker and a prolific writer in Welsh of articles on political, literary and historical subjects. His autobiography, Diolch am gael byw. Rhai o f'atgofion (Thanks for Living), Liverpool, 1968), was published posthumously. His papers are held by the National Library of Wales.
