= Albert Mansbridge =

British educator (1876–1952)

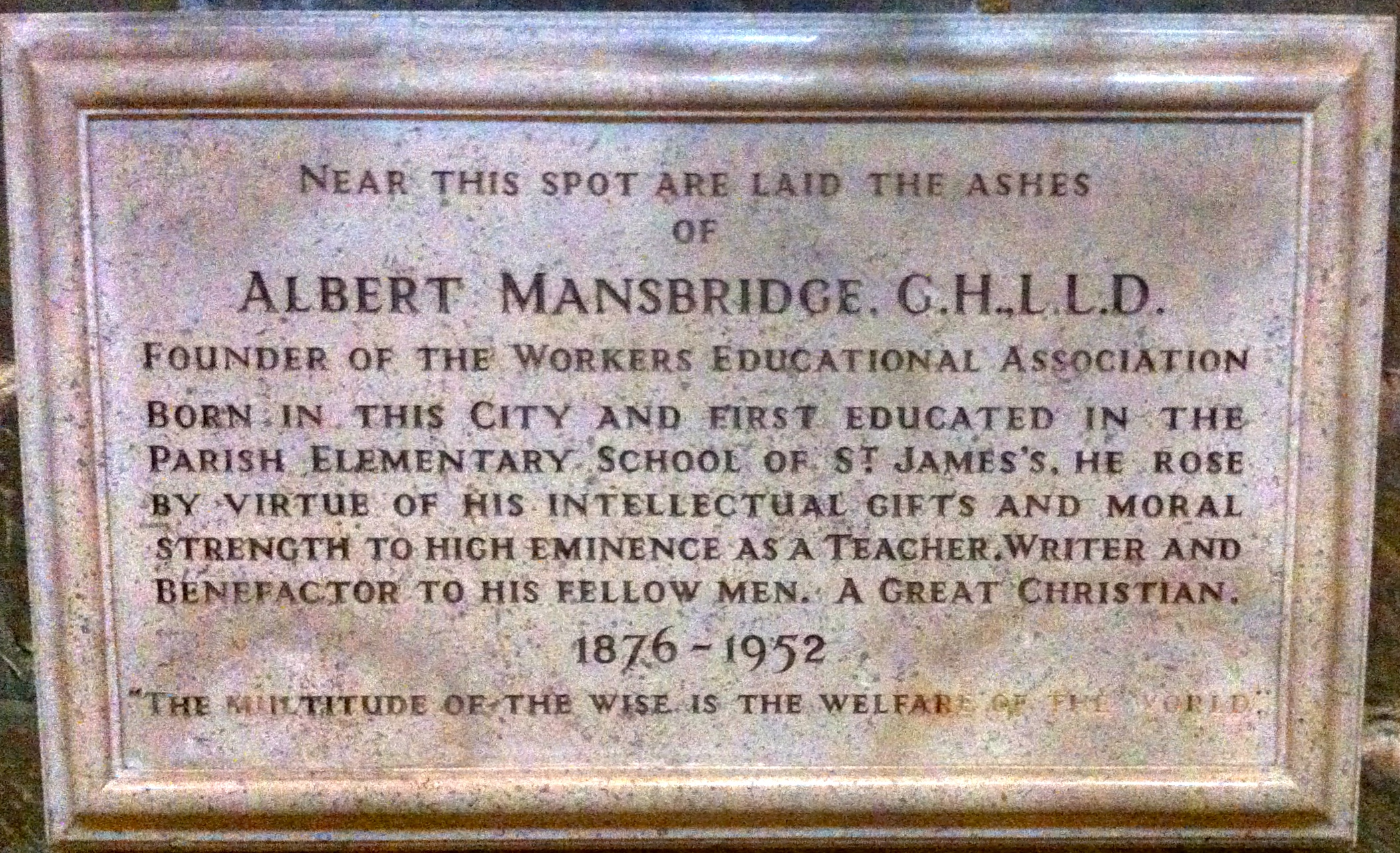
Memorial to Albert Mansbridge in Gloucester Cathedral

Albert Mansbridge, CH (10 January 1876, Gloucester, Gloucestershire, England – 22 August 1952, Torquay, Devon) was an English educator who was one of the pioneers of adult education in Britain. He is best known for his part in co-founding the Workers' Educational Association (WEA) in England in 1903, serving as its first secretary until 1915.

== Biography ==
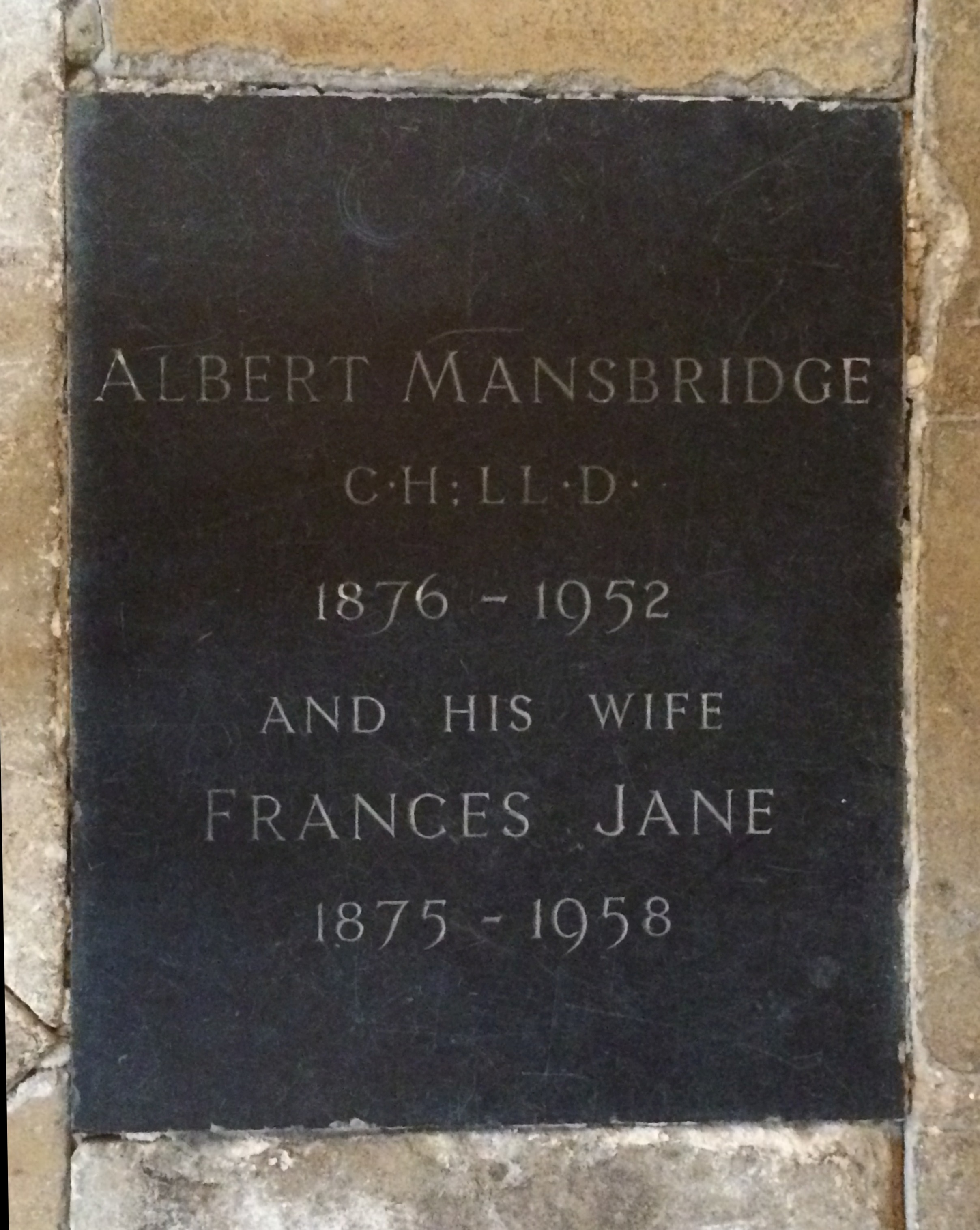
Gloucester Cathedral, grave of Albert Mansbridge

Mansbridge was born the son of a carpenter, Thomas Mansbridge (whose Rank or Profession when Albert was married at the age of 25 was recorded as 'Gentleman'), and due to his family's tight finances had to leave school at 14. As a result was largely self-educated. However he still managed to attend university extension courses at King's College London. He eventually taught evening classes himself in economics, industrial history, and typing, all while taking up clerical work. He married Frances Jane Pringle in the Parish of Battersea, Wandsworth, London, in July 1900 and they had a son, Thomas John, the following July.

Albert had growing concerns over the fact that the extension courses, started in 1873, were aimed at the upper and middle classes. To help the situation he and his wife Frances founded the WEA at a meeting in their home on 16 May 1903, using two shillings and sixpence from the housekeeping money. Originally called An Association to Promote the Higher Education of Working Men, the name change took place in 1905, after pressure from the Women's Co-operative Guild. The association and its aims was quick to be recognized by universities, and Mansbridge left clerical work in 1905 to become its fulltime general secretary.

The first Scottish branch of the WEA was in Springburn, Glasgow, although this only lasted until 1909 at that time, the Edinburgh and Leith Branch coming into existence on 25 October 1912 after a meeting held at the Free Gardeners' Hall, 12–14 Picardy Place, Edinburgh. The meeting was chaired by Lodge and addressed by Albert Mansbridge and Bernard Bosanquet. The meeting was attended by 200 people, including James Munro, who became Secretary of the newly formed branch.

Albert founded international branches of the WEA in Australia in 1913, and later Canada and New Zealand. Mansbridge suffered from spinal meningitis, but after recovering he would go on to form several other adult-education groups. These included the World Association for Adult Education in 1918, the Seafarers' Educational Service in 1919 (The Marine Society College of the Sea), and the British Institute of Adult Education in 1921. In 1922, he delivered the Lowell Lectures in Boston, and for the Pacific School of Religion with the University of California the Earle Lectures in 1926. He also founded the National Central Library, a tutorial system and a scholarly library for working people who were not connected to an academic institution.

He was a member of numerous government committees of education, including the Consultative Committee of the Board of Education from 1906 to 1912, and from 1924 to 1939. From 1915 to 1918, Mansbridge was on the Prime Minister's Committee on the Teaching of Modern Languages. He was a member of the Royal Commission on the Universities of Oxford and Cambridge from 1919 to 1922. He was also on the Statutory Commission on Oxford in 1923. He was a member of numerous church committees, including the Selborne Committee on Church and State from 1914 to 1916.

Albert wrote the preface to Economic Justice; a Text-Book of Political Economy from the Christian Point of View by Gerard Collier, published in 1924. A blue plaque commemorates Mansbridge at 198 Windsor Road in Ilford, Essex.

== Selected publications ==
- 1914: University Tutorial Classes published by Longmans Green in 1914.
- 1920: Adventure in Working Class Education London: Longmans Green
- 1923: The Older Universities of England, London: Longmans Green
- 1929:The Making of an Educationist
- 1932: Margaret Mcmillan: Prophet and Pioneer. London: Dent
- 1934: Brick upon Brick: 50 years [of the] Co-operative Permanent Building Society. (Later renamed Nationwide Building Society) Contains black and white images of personnel, buildings, has a chronology, and includes a substantial appendix section and index. Total of 236 pages.
- 1935: Edward Stuart Talbot & Charles Gore. London: J.M. Dent & Sons Limited
- 1940: The Trodden Road

== See also ==
- John Mansbridge (artist), son
