= Workers' Educational Association =

UK provider of adult education and charity

Workers' Educational Associations (WEA) are not-for-profit bodies that deliver further education to adults in the UK, Australia, New Zealand, and Canada.

== WEA UK ==
WEA UK, founded in 1903, is the UK's largest voluntary sector provider of adult education and one of Britain's biggest charities. The WEA is a democratic and voluntary adult education movement. It delivers learning throughout England and Scotland. There was a related but independent WEA Cymru covering Wales, though it is now known as Adult Learning Wales since a merger in 2015 with YMCA Wales Community College.

The WEA's provision is usually local to its students. In 2015–16 there were over 8,000 courses delivered in over 1,800 community venues and 75% of WEA students travelled less than 2 miles to their class.

The WEA has throughout its history supported the development of similar educational initiatives and associations internationally. It is affiliated to the International Federation of Workers' Education Associations (IFWEA), which has consultative status to UNESCO.

The WEA is divided into nine regions in England, a Scottish Association and over 500 local branches. It creates and delivers about 9,000 courses each year in response to local need across England and Scotland, often in partnership with community groups and local charities. These courses provide learning opportunities for around 65,000 people per year, taught by over 2,000 professional tutors (most of whom work for the WEA part-time).

The WEA is supported by the Government through funding from the Skills Funding Agency in England, and in Scotland by the Scottish Executive and Local Authorities. It also receives fees from learners on many of its courses and is often successful in funding bids from government, lottery and other sources for educational projects in local communities around the country.

=== History ===
Albert Mansbridge (10 January 1876 – 22 August 1952) and his wife Frances (née Frances Jane Pringle, 1876–1958) established An Association to promote the Higher Education of Working Men in 1903 (renamed 'Workers Educational Association' in 1905), funded by two shillings and sixpence from the housekeeping money. William Temple became the first president in 1908.

The first Scottish branch of the WEA was in Springburn, Glasgow, although this only lasted until 1909 at that time, the Edinburgh and Leith Branch coming into existence on 25 October 1912 after a meeting held at the Free Gardeners' Hall, 12-14 Picardy Place, Edinburgh. The meeting was chaired by Professor Lodge and addressed by Albert Mansbridge and Dr. Bernard Bosanquet. The meeting was attended by 200 people, including James Munro who became Secretary of the newly formed branch.

WEA branches for North and South Wales were established early in the 20th century. An instrumental figure was David Thomas, who taught classes for the WEA in Caernarfonshire from 1928 to 1959, and instigated the founding of Lleufer (Light) as a Welsh-language WEA periodical, which he edited it until 1965. Coleg Harlech was founded in 1925 as a residential college for workers' education, and in 2001 merged with the WEA (North Wales). Further mergers in 2014 unified North and South, then in 2015 WEA Cymru merged with YMCA Community College to form Adult Learning Wales - Addysg Oedolion Cymru.

WEA NI was first set up in Belfast in 1910. It would come to operate across Northern Ireland and in the Border Counties in the Republic. It eventually had around 6,500 learners in any given year. It ceased to function in June 2014, when it ran into a cash flow problem and its bank refused to extend credit. It provided adult education in community and workplace settings. Its title was somewhat misleading as it provided education for all types of people and in particular tried to reach out to those who missed out on learning first time round. It worked mainly with those over 18. Its courses were organized mainly in venues such as community halls, arts centres and training rooms in workplaces.

=== Leadership ===
==== Presidents ====
1908: William Temple
1924: Fred Bramley
1926: Arthur Pugh
1928: R. H. Tawney
1944: Harold Clay
1958: Asa Briggs
1968: Ellen McCullough
1971: Billy Hughes
1981: Bernard Jennings
1990s: Bill Conboy
2008: Colin Barnes
2016: Lynne Smith
2020: Pat Kynaston

==== General Secretaries ====
1905: Albert Mansbridge
1916: J. M. MacTavish
1928: John William Muir
1931: Alec Firth
1934: Ernest Green
1951: Harry Nutt
1970: Reginal James Jefferies
1982: Robert Lochrie
2003: Richard Bolsin
2012: Ruth Spellman
2020-2026(current): Simon Parkinson

== Australia and New Zealand ==
Cigarette card featuring coat of arms of Workers' Education Association of Australasia, Sydney 1929

In 1913, the University of Melbourne invited Mansbridge to visit Australia to help set up branches there. The Mansbrige family arrived on 8 July on a 17-week mission aimed at forming branches of the association in New South Wales, Queensland, Victoria, South Australia, Western Australia and Tasmania and WEAs were initially set up in all states.

During this trip the Mansbridges then made a brief visit to New Zealand where WEA branches were established in 1915. Seven branches are still operating. Branches in Waitakere, Kāpiti Coast, Wellington, Canterbury, Te Anau, Gore and Southland provides flexible learning to over 12,000 students each year. The Canterbury branch initially held its classes in a dingy rented room down a back alley; now it is homed in the central city villa it purchased in 1957, where it teaches over 130 courses a year. From the 1920s, it took adult education to nearly every nook and cranny of the Canterbury and Westland provinces through a travelling library book scheme.

Early work was patterned on the WEAs in the UK. As in the UK, the WEAs in Australia became general adult education agencies.

Reorganization in 1994 saw the WEA in New South Wales split into WEA Sydney, WEA Hunter in Newcastle (now Atwea College) and WEA Illawarra in Wollongong. WEA Sydney has many clubs and societies associated with their operation. A typical example is the WEA Film Study Group based in New South Wales.

As of 2026, WEA South Australia, founded in 1913, claims to be 'Australia's largest non-government adult community education organisation'.

After being in recess for many years, WEA Victoria was briefly revived in 2015.

Similar Australian organisations include Melbourne's Centre for Adult Education, and historically, the many mechanics' institutes across the country.

== Canada ==
There are also some branches in Canada which have presently and currently opened in March 2014 although however its services has been established since 1917 (98 years old) and is part of the WEA International; it operates mainly in Toronto, Ottawa, and Halifax as well as St Johns. it is currently operated under the Canadian government licences and jurisdictions of division branch companies ltd.' (LLC).

== See also ==
- Adult education
- Community college
- Continuing education
- Lifelong learning
- Vocational education
