= Michael Brotherton (priest) =

English Anglican priest (1935–2025)

John Michael Brotherton (7 December 1935 – 12 February 2025) was an English Anglican priest.

Brotherton was born on 7 December 1935 and educated at St John's College, Cambridge, and Ripon College Cuddesdon. He was ordained in 1962 and was a curate at St Nicholas' Chiswick, after which he was chaplain of Trinity College, Moka. He was rector of St Michael's Diego Martin from 1969 to 1975 and then vicar of St Mary and St John's Oxford. From 1981 to 1991 he was vicar of St Mary's, Portsea, in Portsmouth. From 1991 until his retirement in 2002 he was the Archdeacon of Chichester. Brotherton died on 12 February 2025 at the age of 89.

Church of England titles
Preceded by Keith Hobbs	Archdeacon of Chichester; 1991–2002	Succeeded by Douglas McKittrick
