= Francis Mount =

Anglican priest

Francis John Mount (14 October 1831 – 9 May 1903) was an Anglican priest.

Mount was educated at Eton and Oriel College, Oxford and ordained in 1855. He began his career with a curacy at St Mark's Horsham after which he was an Examining Chaplain to the Bishop of Chichester and Vicar of Firle then Cuckfield. In 1887 he became Archdeacon of Chichester and in 1899 Vicar of Burpham, holding both posts until his death. He was offered the deanery of Chichester Cathedral in late December 1901, but declined due to illness.

Mount's father William, brother William and nephew William were all Members of Parliament.

Church of England titles
Preceded by John Russell Walker	Archdeacon of Chichester; 1887–1903	Succeeded by Edward Leighton Elwes
