= Henry Ball =

Henry Ball may refer to:

- Henry Lidgbird Ball (1756–1818), Royal Navy officer
- Henry John Ball (c. 1820–1874), Hong Kong Judge and government official
- Henry Ball (priest) (died 1603), Archdeacon of Chichester, 1596–1603

== See also ==
- Harry Ball (disambiguation)
