= Charles Alcock =

Charles Alcock may refer to:

- Charles Alcock (priest) (1754–1803), English priest
- Charles R. Alcock (born 1951), New Zealand astronomer
- Charles W. Alcock (1842–1907), sports administrator, creator of the FA Cup and organiser of the first cricket Test in England
