= St Paul's Church, Whitley Bay =

Church in Tyne and Wear, England

Coordinates: 55°2′30.05″N 1°26′52.11″W

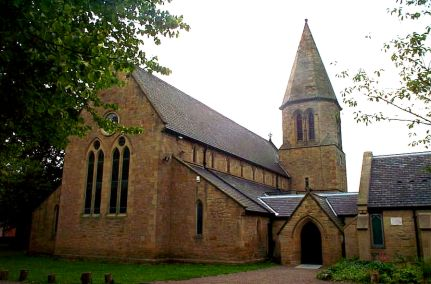
- St Paul's Church in Whitley Bay Town Centre
- St Paul's Church, Whitley Bay
- Denomination: Church of England
- Churchmanship: Anglo-Catholic

History
- Dedication: Saint Paul

Architecture
- Heritage designation: Grade II
- Architect: Anthony Salvin

Administration
- Province: Province of York
- Diocese: Diocese of Newcastle
- Deanery: Tynemouth

Clergy
- Bishop: The Rt Revd Christine Hardman
- Vicar: Fr John Vilaseca

St Paul's Church is the parish church of Whitley Bay, North Tyneside, United Kingdom.The church was founded in 1864. The church's official title is St Paul's Church, Cullercoats but it is located near the centre of the town rather than the suburb of Cullercoats.

== History ==
The building was designed by Anthony Salvin for the Duke of Northumberland. It is designated by English Heritage as a Grade II listed building.

=== Present day ===
The church produces a regular newsletter and parish magazine. It also holds an annual summer fair and the St Nicholas Fair and Festival during the first weekend in Advent.

Ann Laing and Sandra Graham are the churchwardens.

The parish was in the Traditional Catholic tradition, and passed resolutions to reject the ordination of women and so received alternative episcopal oversight from the Bishop of Beverley. It has now rescinded those resolutions and receives episcopal oversight from the Bishop of Newcastle.

== Parochial church council ==
The parochial church council (PCC) oversees the administration, finances and fabric of the church. The 22 member council, which meets monthly, comprises two clergy, one lay reader, two churchwardens, one treasurer, one diocesan synod representative (who attends meetings with others from the Diocese of Newcastle and Tynemouth Deanery), three deanery synod representatives (who attend meetings with others from the Tynemouth Deanery) and 12 lay members. All members except the clergy and lay reader are elected. The standing committee, consisting of five PCC members, deals with any emergency issues arising between meetings and sets agenda for PCC meetings.

== Notable clergy ==
- Norman Banks, later Bishop of Richborough, was the vicar from 1990 until 2000.
- Paul Bayes, later Bishop of Liverpool, served his curacy at St Paul's from 1979 until 1982.

=== List of Vicars ===
Name	Years of Service
Canon R. F. Wheeler	1861 - 1885
The Reverend E. Smith	1885 - 1916
The Reverend F. L. Cattell	1916 - 1924
The Reverend F. J. Burt	1924 - 1928
The Reverend F. M. Dowland	1928 - 1933
The Reverend J. E. Jenkins	1933 - 1941
The Reverend F. R. Hedley	1941 - 1955
The Reverend R. H. C. Henwood	1955 - 1963
The Reverend J. H. Chicken	1963 - 1972
The Reverend R. O. Stroud	1972 - 1977
The Reverend Peter V. Rendell	1977 - 1989
The Reverend Norman Aidan Banks	1990 - 2002
The Reverend Gavin Gilchrist	2002 - 2018
The Reverend John Vilaseca	2019 -

== Music ==
The church has a 15-strong choir. A former organist, John Percival Forster, was killed in the Battle of the Somme on 1 July 1916, aged 28. He was organist at St Paul's for six years from 1912 to 1916. A plaque commemorating his life remains to the right of the altar.

== See also ==
- List of new churches by Anthony Salvin
