= William Filby =

William Filby may refer to:

- William Filby (Roman Catholic priest) (c. 1557–1582), Roman Catholic priest and martyr in medieval England
- William Filby (Anglican priest) (1933–2009), Anglican priest
