= Cause of Death (video game) =

2010 video game

Cause of Death: Can you Catch the Killer?
- Cause of Death game logo
- Developers: Centerscore (mobile); EA Mobile
- Series: Sister game of Surviving High School
- Platforms: iOS, macOS
- Release: WW: December 16, 2010 (first volume) - July 18, 2014 (last episode)
- Genres: Interactive fiction, visual novel
- Mode: Single-player

Cause of Death: Can You Catch the Killer? was a video game developed and published by EA Mobile for iOS and macOS devices on December 16, 2010, that was removed from the App Store in September 2014. While being almost identical in gameplay, the game is intended for a more mature audience than its companion game, Surviving High School, as the game revolves around crime and serial killers and their pursuit by law enforcement. The suggested age on the App Store was 12+. Cause of Death is a visual novel that is divided into a series of volumes, each of which is made up of eight chapters (excluding the first, fourteenth and sixteenth volumes). The base game (which was free from the App Store came with the entire first Volume—future content needed to have been downloaded either by "Episodes on Demand" or "Now Airing". The first 6-episode volume was released in December 2010, and the series released its final episode in July 2014, and the game was unlisted from the App Store in September 2014.

== Development ==
The game was conceived in 2004 as the first story game for phones; the concept was developed before a writer had joined the team. They found a student at Stanford, who began writing the game at nights after class. This would become Surviving High School, launched in 2005. The development team followed this up with Cause of Death, and later High School Story, Hollywood U, and Choices: Stories You Play, under the names Centerscore, Vivendi Games, EA, and Pixelberry Studios.

It usually took over a week to write each Cause of Death chapter, and because of this grueling release schedule the writing staff often had to work late (sometimes through the night), due to not wanting to disappoint their fans, who can "get restless when an episode is late, even by a matter of hours". When the staff discover that "a fan is excited about [their] stories or appreciative of [their] work" via Tumblr reviews or a Facebook comment, it "makes a big impact in the office", as it is a validation of their hard work.

When some of the writers work on the gruesome murders that take place throughout the series, they like to become fully immersed in their research, for example filling "[their] cubicle walls were covered in tarot cards and books about voodoo" when writing a psychic-themed episode." The game was a crime-based spin-off of Surviving High School. As many of the CoD writers also work on Surviving High School and switch between the two projects, there is a major contrast between the lighthearted and dark tones, particularly in the earlier years of SHS, which provides a nice change of pace and variety. Though originally Cause of Death and Surviving High School were constructed in two very different ways, over time SHS was altered to reflect CoD, becoming a more plot and character driven story rather and being directed at a more adult target audience. The Surviving High School visual novel engine was repurposed toward the gritty crime drama in Cause of Death. The art style also changed to become more realistic, expressive and gritty, and the minigame-style gameplay was replaced by an interactive movie structure. There has been at least one crossover between the two games, and some characters gave from one game have family members who are only present in the other game.

Some of the choices made by the writing staff have led to backlash by the audience. In particular, the Blaise-Jeremy pairing was seen as controversial to some, arguing that it is unrealistic and unwarranted, so the writers explained the rationale behind it: "There's something significant in looking at how opposites attract. You see it in real life all the time. Nice girls date jerks. Straight-laced guys go after free-spirited girls. Sometimes we're secretly looking for that person who will push us beyond what we're comfortable with...The BlaiseBird thing is all so refreshingly simple. I think Blaise was fed up with drama and just went for something she wanted, for better or for worse. Everyone else's love life on CoD is so pained and complex, so it's nice to have a romance that is so unromantic".

Writers for the series include Winchester, Georgia, Doc, Lily, Rasputin among others. They are hired due to certain talents while they stay away from other areas. For example, in the wedding episodes between Natara and Oscar, Winchester's role consisted on planning the "wedding-themed violence" in the action scenes, while Lily did some of the more "grace[ful]" writing. The kiss between Natara and Mal at the end of the episode was a tough moment to write that went through many drafts, as it was an integral "exciting" turning-point of the series. While "originally, it was a smaller, more subdued moment, just very warm, and honest, and intimate", teammate Rasputin argued "No. People have been waiting for this for ten volumes. This moment needs to be much, much bigger", so he added "more description, way more emotion [and] a gentle rain".

The game has both a frequently-updated Facebook account and a Twitter account in order to provide information about upcoming episode and other information related to Cause of Death or Surviving High School. Surviving High School (EA), Cause of Death (EA), High School Story (Pixelberry) set a rare track record of three games by the same development team entering the top 25 grossing chart.

After over 3 1/2 years and 170+ pieces of content (much of which now is available as a bundle pack), the series ended in July 2014, and its finale announced the app will be removed from the App Store sometime. Just two months after game's finale was released, the game was completely removed from the app store.

== Gameplay ==
Written in second-person (where the player plays from the perspective of characters), Cause of Death is very passive and laid-back gameplay-wise; it is purely a Visual Novel with major elements of Interactive Fiction and classic Choose Your Own Adventure books. The game is focused on storytelling, with a character's dialogue (or narrative dialogue) appearing above background images which shift to fit the location. Tapping the screen moves the text forward, and eventually, the player must make decisions to say or do something—these are shown with multiple options on the screen, and the player must select one.

Most but not all decisions will grant the player Detective Points if the correct choice is made. During action scenes or important conversations, failing a certain number of decisions will result in the player failing or dying; when this happens, the game will show a non-canon death/failure sequence (some of which are actually quite detailed) before the player gets a Game Over, requiring a revert to the last checkpoint or a replay of the chapter. If the player got 80-100 out of 100 Det. Points, they will get a bonus scene (Volume 1 needed 500-600 Det. Points for all 6 chapters together and had only 1 bonus scene at the end if this was met). These bonus scenes "are usually just short scenes which show something about the story you wouldn't have seen otherwise. It isn't vital that you see them all, but it does give you a sense of achievement when you manage it".

The game is "packed with mystery and suspense", and is "aimed at adults, due to the graphic nature of the plot and occasional sexual references". It is "a bit like the “Choose Your Own Adventure” books, but on the iPhone".

== Episodic Content System ==
What distinguished EA's visual novels (this and Surviving High School) from others is the fact that their games released new content periodically. There are 2 ways to do this; Now Airing and Episodes on Demand. Up until July 2011, episodes were released weekly on Friday; this became weekly on Mondays from then until September 2013; episodes began releasing bi-weekly (first on Mondays later on Wednesdays) from then on.

When an episode was released on On Demand, the previous episode would become available on Now Airing for free (though only one Now Airing episode can be on an iDevice at once). So On Demand players would experience the story faster and could freely play their episodes at any time, but paid more. Now Airing players wouldn't pay at all, but they would experience their story much slower and only be able to play an episode a time.

== Story ==
Cause of Death has a plot inspired by crime scene investigation television shows and is based upon solving murder mysteries. Other prominent themes include friendship, love, trust, morality and criminology. The story takes place mostly in San Francisco, although some there are a handful of situations (most notably part of Volume 11, nearly all of Volume 15 and most of Volume 16)) take place in other areas. Most protagonists are members of the SFPD (including FBI Agent Natara Williams), whilst the antagonists are serial killers; a plurality of whom have unique MO's, victimologies, motivations and backstories (predominately of tragedy or abuse). Organized, financial and political crimes have all been featured at some point, and crimes that are correlative to the protagonists themselves also play a role in the game's storyline. In the earlier seasons (particularly the first), the game's storyline had a stronger focus on criminals and crimes rather than characters. However, as the game progressed, the SFPD members and their character development have become a much more prominent focus.

=== Volumes ===
Volume 1 was available for free in the base game. The remaining volumes are available to purchase as a set at various prices.

The length date's listed here are in relation to their release on Episodes on Demand. Note that sometime after all 8 episodes are released On Demand, they become released as part of a volume set; the release dates here list from the first episode's release to the last episode's release. These dates do not take into account Now Airing or the Volume Pack.

Except where otherwise noted, all volumes have 8 chapters not counting interludes or short stories released within.

Volume No.	Volume Title	Summary	Length
1.	The Maskmaker	Natara Williams, FBI Agent, and Mal Fallon, SFPD Detective, pair up to hunt down & defeat The Maskmaker, a horrifying serial killer plastering plaster on his female victim's faces.	December 2010 (6 chapters, released at once)
2.	The Connoisseur	As a bloodthirsty family seeks revenge, and as a close relative of a team member is held hostage, the unanswered questions the first volume's conclusion left are looked into.	December 2010 – February 2011
3.	The Hunters	Killers all over the city, most notably madmen treating humans like big game who cross paths with a protagonist's loved one, are searched for.	February 2011 – April 2011
4.	Zero	Largely based on the Zodiac Killer, a killer dormant for 4 decades sprawls back to murder as the cartel family seeks revenge.	April 2011 – June 2011
5.	Hand of Justice	After a gruesome killer looking for revenge is defeated (first four chapters), a bloodthirsty vigilante, with a surprising secret identity, becomes the next manhunt's target (last four chapters).	June 2011 – August 2011
6.	Mad Stranger	Perhaps the most elaborate killer yet engages the city in a chess-like game of murder.	September 2011 – October 2011
7.	The Ladykiller	The team is determined to apprehend a man drowning women in bathtubs.	November 2011 – January 2012
8.	The Kraken	Warfare, with grave costs to the SFPD, is waged onto the city by a murderous cult.	February 2012 – April 2012
9.	Livewire	As the events of the previous volume take tolls on the team, they search for an electrocution-based murderer.	April 2012 – June 2012
10.	Nightmare	As one of the team member's wedding day accelerates towards them, a spawn of drugs inducing murderous activity is released onto the city.	July 2012 – September 2012
11.	The Salazars	When one of their main agents goes missing, the team must literally look far and wide to find and save him.	September 2012 – November 2012
12.	The Boogeyman	The hunt for the killer of abusive parents strains a relationship.	December 2012 – February 2013
13.	Spinerette	As an overall conspiracy regarding a great evil and a shocking murder is unraveled, bodies pile up as venomous spiders are unleashed.	March 2013 – April 2013
14.	The Firstborn	The most devastating and destructive of all killers faced is confronted by both the old and a new team.	May 2013 – August 2013 (9 chapters)
15.	The Cleaners	Now an international agency, the team investigates a series of murders in London.	September 2013 – February 2014
16.	Ronin	After going to great lengths to resolve an extremely-skilled killer that incites fear en masse to Tokyo, the team returns to San Francisco to take care of one last thing.	March 2014 – July 2014 (7 chapters)

=== Other Content ===
Aside from Volumes, the game also offers the following content:

- Side Stories: In between each volume is a side story, which usually revolves around a side, recurring or secondary character to the game.
- Premium Content: Generally released in between or during a volume. Premium Content almost always have absolutely no decision-making, allowing the player to read at their own pace. Occasionally consists of multiple stories and is sometimes released as an On Demand exclusive.
- Interludes: Volumes from the ninth onwards (excluding Volume 12) have an interlude released between 2 of their chapters (usually the 4th and 5th).

=== Characters ===
Cause of Death, across its many volumes, features a vast and wide range of main, recurring and minor characters. The main protagonists of the series are Mal Fallon and Natara Williams, an SFPD detective and an FBI Special Agent respectively. The main antagonists of the game are the serial killers and members of organized crime who put the safety of the protagonists and/or the city at risk. Witnesses, victims and neutral characters are also found.

Protagonists include Mal Fallon and Natara Williams (throughout the series); no other protagonist is present throughout the entire series. Other protagonists include detectives Blaise Corso (Vol 8 onwards), Ken Greene (Vol 1 to 8) and Jeremy Redbird (Vol 9 onwards); forensic analyst Kai Kalaba and data analysis Amy Chen; and commanding officers Maria Yeong and Charles Anders.

Some of the series' more notable antagonists include The Maskmaker (Vol 1), The Connoisseur (Volumes 2 thru 14), The Kraken (Vol 8), The Firstborn (Volume 14 onwards) and The Onryo (Volumes 16).

== Critical reception ==
Cause of Death has received almost universal acclaim, albeit in most cases while only the first episode was reviewed so it may not be representative of the series as a whole.

Brad Gallaway of GameCritics.com said "Cause of Death: Volume 1—The Maskmaker isn't the sort of thing that I'd want to play all the time or for long stretches", and described it as a "little morsel of romance-flavored cotton candy". Dave Walsh of Five Star Apps said "If you're a big CSI or crime-genre fan I would say you definitely need to download this game when you have the chance", and rated it 5 stars out of 5. Chris Hall of 148Apps gave the series a rating of 4.5 out of 5 stars, saying "While it probably won't be of much interest to those who aren't interested in reading, Cause of Death is definitely the best interactive novel that I've come across in the App Store. It's fairly smart, flows nicely, and most importantly, is fun. App Unwrapper gave the game 5/5 stars, writing "The story is creepy and satisfying, with enough twists to keep you guessing till the end. If you're a fan of horror or suspense stories, you won't want to miss this one." Andrew Webster of Gamezebo said "Cause of Death: Can You Catch the Killer? is as heart pounding as any thriller on TV, even if it is essentially a text based adventure. The actual interactivity is quite limited, but the game is so well written and finely tuned that it doesn't matter. It also features a great episodic structure that hopefully means we'll still be playing Cause of Death for some time to come", and gave the game 4 out of 5 stars. Gamers Sphere gave the game 8.5 out of 10, writing "The game's believable characters and well-written dialogue kept me extremely interested in the story, and the plot itself is clever and enjoyable. I felt like some of the quick-time events were unnecessary, but they are definitely not a deal breaker." iFanzine wrote that the game was "An intelligently written and gripping thriller powered by well implemented interactive elements, impressive production values and the gloss of a big-budget TV show. In short, a must-read game".

Giving the first four seasons 4/5 stars, BrightHub said the game is "for people with a passion for gritty storylines and fast paced action." It added "The free weekly downloads are great...if you enjoy the game, but don't want to pay anything for it" and "if you don't mind paying, the previous volumes are archived in the game so you can catch up if you want to." Praising the writing, the site said "The storylines are incredible. With each new volume, you can never quite predict what is going to happen next. There is some clever writing in this game, and in spite of the serious nature of the crimes, there is also a lot of humor throughout." It also praised the quality of character development by writing "The characters in Cause of Death have been created very carefully. Each has their own backstory, which is slowly revealed during game play, but it isn't invasive enough to interfere with the murder mystery aspect. Most of the time it is quite subtle". Negative aspects included no alert when new episodes are released, in-game ads, and occasional download problems. It concluded that "[the game is] very easy to play", "there is excellent replay value", and "It is probably best to avoid it if you are easily scared".
