= Cause of death (disambiguation) =

Cause of death is a term typically used on official reports.

Cause of death may also refer to:

== Video games ==
- Cause of Death (video game), 2010 video game

== Film ==
- Cause of Death, a 2000 film by Shimon Dotan
- Cause of Death: Unknown, a 2023 Iranian drama film by Ali Zarnegar

== Health and medicine ==
- List of causes of death by rate, listed by percentages compared
- List of preventable causes of death, listed by types of cause

== Music ==
- ”Cause of Death”, a song by Motionless in White from their 2022 album Scoring the End of the World.
- Cause of Death (album), a 1990 album by Obituary
- "The Cause of Death", a song by Immortal Technique from Revolutionary Vol. 2

== Literature ==
- Cause of Death (novel), a 1996 crime fiction novel by Patricia Cornwell

== See also ==
- Death#Causes of human death
