= Roger Combes =

British priest

The Venerable Roger Combes
- Archdeacon of Horsham
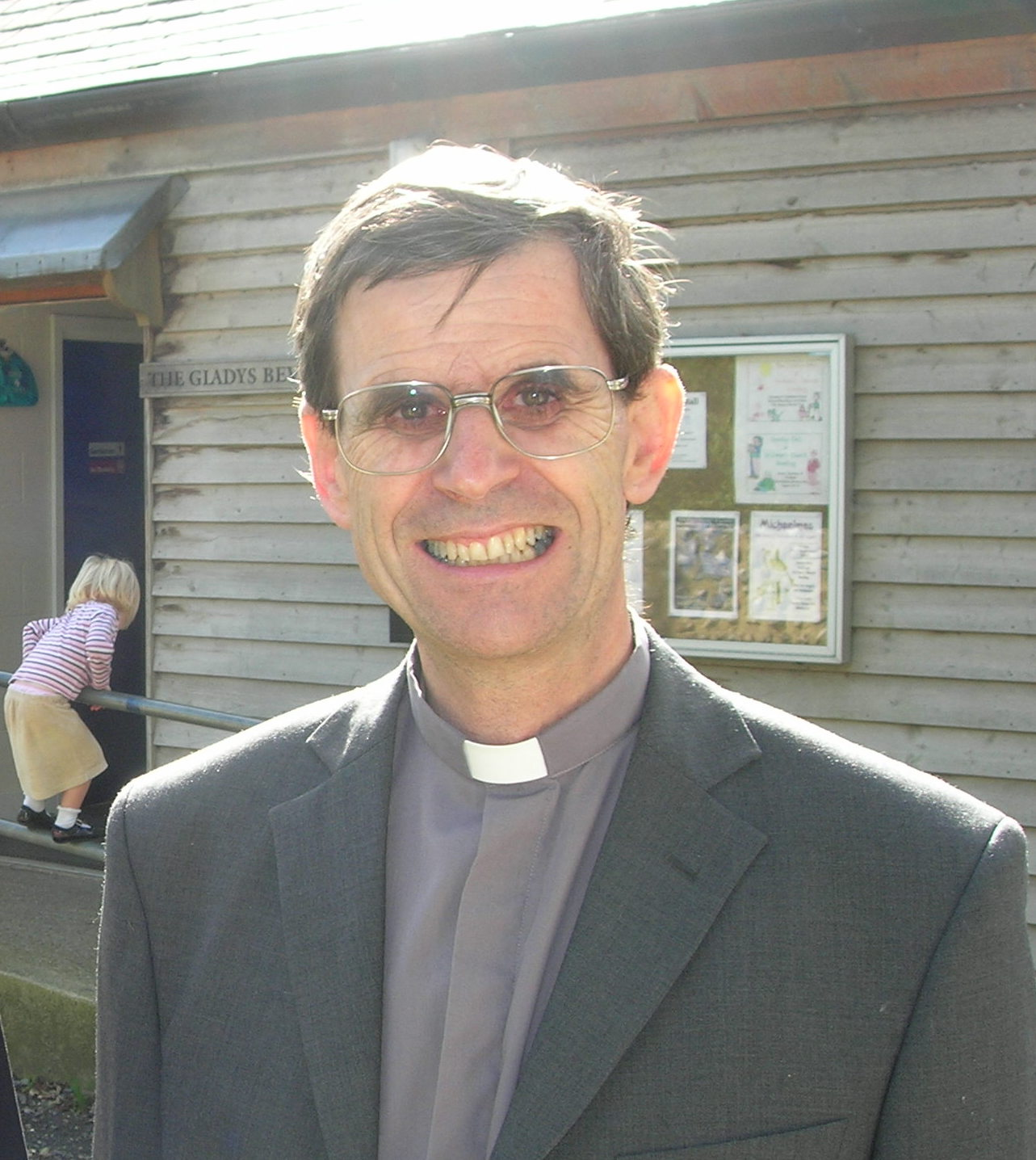
- Combes visiting Sele Priory Church at Upper Beeding in 2006.
- Church: Church of England
- Diocese: Diocese of Chichester
- In office: 2003 until 2014
- Predecessor: William Filby
- Successor: Fiona Windsor

Orders
- Ordination: 1974 (deacon); 1975 (priest)

Personal details
- Born: Roger Matthew Combes; 12 June 1947 (age 79)
- Denomination: Anglicanism
- Spouse: Christine Keiller
- Education: King's College London; Ridley Hall, Cambridge

Roger Matthew Combes (born 12 June 1947) is a retired Archdeacon of Horsham.

== Birth and education ==
Combes was educated at King's College London, and Ridley Hall, Cambridge.

== Church career ==
Combes was ordained in 1974 and was a curate at St Paul's, Onslow Square, Holy Trinity Brompton, and Holy Sepulchre with All Saints, Cambridge. He became Rector of Silverhill, East Sussex, in 1983 and was the Archdeacon of Horsham from 2003 until his retirement in 2014.

Combes was associated with the running of the Iwerne camps, evangelical Christian holiday camps aimed at children from British public schools. He was one of the eight people to be circulated the Ruston Report in 1982, detailing the abuse of children at Winchester College and elsewhere by chairman of the Iwerne Trust John Smyth. Combes later stated to a 2020s Church of England Independent Review that realising the nature of the report, he chose not to read it as he felt that victims would be embarrassed if he knew the details, so he did not know just how serious the allegations were until the details became public in 2017.

== Personal life ==
In 1983 he married Christine Mary Keiller.

== Notes ==
Church of England titles
Preceded by William Charles Leonard Filby	Archdeacon of Horsham; 2003–2014	Succeeded by Fiona Windsor
