= Hollingbery =

Hollingbery is a surname. Notable people with the surname include:

- Babe Hollingbery (1893–1974), American football coach
- George Hollingbery (born 1963), British politician
- Thomas Hollingbery, 18th-century English Anglican priest
- Vilma Hollingbery (born 1932), British actress

There is a town on the south of England near Brighton by the name of Hollingbury which may be the source of Hollingbery surname.
