= Harry Ball =

Harry Ball may refer to:

- Harry Ball (figure skater) in Canadian Figure Skating Championships
- Harry Ball, character in After the Ball

== See also ==
- Henry Ball (disambiguation)
- Harold Ball (1920–1942), Australian rules footballer
