= John Russell Walker =

The Ven John Russell Walker , MA was an eminent Anglican priest in the last third of the 19th century.

He was born in Bury on 18 June 1837 and educated at University College, Oxford. He was ordained in 1863 and was Curate of Middleton and then Walmersley. The following year he married Augusta Margaret Hornby of Poole Hall, Nantwich. He was appointed a Canon of Manchester Cathedral in 1870 and then of Chichester in 1874. In 1879 he became Archdeacon of Chichester, dying in post on 31 October 1887 after a short illness.

== Notes ==
Church of England titles
Preceded by James Garbett	Archdeacon of Chichester; 1887–1903	Succeeded by Francis John Mount
