= Archdeacon of Horsham =

Ecclesiastical title in the Church of England

The Archdeacon of Horsham is a senior ecclesiastical officer in the Church of England Diocese of Chichester. The diocese almost exactly covers the counties of East and West Sussex and the City of Brighton and Hove, stretching for nearly a hundred miles (160 km) along the south coast of England.

== History ==
The diocese originally had two archdeaconries created in the 12th century, namely that of Chichester and that of Lewes; a third archdeaconry was created in 1912 at Hastings. The archdeaconries were then reorganised under Eric Kemp (Bishop of Chichester) on 28 June 1975 with the Archdeaconry of Lewes being merged with that of Hastings and a new archdeaconry at Horsham being created.

On 12 May 2014, it was announced that the diocese was to take forward proposals to create a fourth archdeaconry (initially referred to as Brighton.) Since Lewes itself would be within the new archdeaconry, Lewes & Hastings archdeaconry would become simply Hastings archdeaconry. On 8 August 2014, the Church Times reported that the archdeaconry of Brighton & Lewes had been created and Hastings archdeaconry renamed.

Today the Bishop of Chichester is assisted by the suffragan bishops of Horsham and Lewes. There is one archdeacon for Chichester, one for Horsham, one for Brighton & Lewes and one for the Hastings archdeaconry. The Bishop of Horsham oversees the archdeaconries of Chichester and Horsham, while the Bishop of Lewes oversees the archdeaconries of Brighton & Lewes and Hastings.

== List of archdeacons ==
- 1975–1983 (res.): Frederick Kerr-Dineen
- 1983–2002 (ret.): William Filby (afterwards archdeacon emeritus)
- 2003–30 June 2014 (ret.): Roger Combes
- 21 September 2014 – June 2020 (ret.): Fiona Windsor
- March 2020 – 2021: Julia Peaty & Derek Welsman, Acting Archdeacons
- 1 March 2021 – Angela Martin, Acting Archdeacon
- 4 July 2021 – present: Angela Martin
