= William Walesby =

William Walesby (died 1458) was a Canon of Windsor from 1441 to 1450 and Archdeacon of Chichester from 1444 to 1444.

== Career ==
He was appointed:

- Prebendary of Church of St Mary de Castro, Leicester 1431
- Dean of Church of St Mary de Castro, Leicester 1431 - 1450
- Rector of North Crawley, Buckinghamshire 1439 - 1449
- Rector of Holy Trinity, Upper Chelsea until 1450
- Prebendary of Hurst in Chichester 1421
- Chaplain to the King
- Archdeacon of Chichester 1440
- Prebendary of Lincoln 1441
- Prebendary of Fordington and Writhlington in Salisbury 1444 - 1458
- Rector of Hayes, Middlesex 1450 - 1458
- Prebendary of St Stephen's Westminster
- Dean of St Stephen's Westminster 1445

He was appointed to the ninth stall in St George's Chapel, Windsor Castle in 1441 and held the canonry until 1450.
