= Charles Clarke (priest) =

The Ven Charles Philip Stewart Clarke, MA was an eminent Anglican priest and author in the middle third of the 20th century.

He was born in 1871 and educated at Clifton College and Christ Church, Oxford. Ordained in 1895, he was Head of the Christ Church (Oxford) Mission in Poplar until 1908. He held incumbencies at Fenton, High Wycombe, Donhead St Andrew, North Stoneham and Trotton after which he was Archdeacon of Chichester from 1934 until 1946; and a Canon Residentiary at the cathedral from 1936. He retired from both posts in 1946 and died a year later on 18 December 1947.

Clarke was married in 1909 to Madeleine Brooke, daughter of John and Lady Wilhelmina Brooke of Haughton Hall, and had a son and two daughters.

== Works ==
- Everyman's Book of Saints. [With plates] (1914)
- Church History from Nero to Constantine (1920)
- St. Ignatius and St. Polycarp (1930)
- Saints and Heroes of the Christian Church. [With portraits] (1931)
- The Oxford Movement and after (1932)
- Bishop Hobart and the Oxford Movement (1933)
- The Case of the Church of England against Rome (1937)
- The Via Media. Being a vindication of the faith and order of the Church of England, etc. (1937)
- Bishop Chandler. A Memoir. [With a portrait] (1940)

=== Posthumous ===
- Short History of the Christian Church, etc. (New edition) (1948, 3rd edition 1957)
- Roman Claims: A Discussion by an English Churchman (1948)

== Notes ==
Church of England titles
Preceded by Benedict George Hoskyns	Archdeacon of Chichester; 1934 – 1946	Succeeded by Lancelot Mason
