= Archdeacon of Chichester =

Senior clergy position

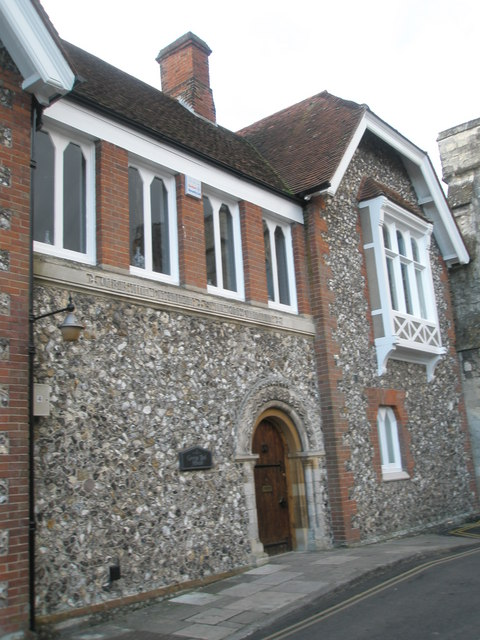
Bell House, former archdeacons' residence in Chichester

The post of Archdeacon of Chichester was created in the 12th century, although the Diocese of Sussex was founded by St Wilfrid, the exiled Bishop of York, in AD 681. The original location of the see was in Selsey. The see was moved to Chichester, in about 1075, by decree of the Synod of London.

The current archdeacon is Tom Carpenter, since September 2025.

== History ==
After the Norman Conquest a uniform system of territorial archdeaconries was created to try to ensure that no settlement was more than a day's ride from the bishop's seat. In 1070 the Council of Windsor decreed that bishops should appoint archdeacons to their churches. The archdeacon acted as the bishop's deputy and representative and had the job of supervising parish churches in the diocese.

Saint Richard, Bishop of Chichester in the 13th century, produced a body of statutes which included the duties of his archdeacons: "They were to administer justice for their proper fees, not demanding more for the expedition or delay of business. They were to visit the churches regularly to see the services were duly celebrated, the vessels and vestments in proper order, the canon of mass correctly followed and distinctly read."

The modern role of an archdeacon in the Church of England has not changed significantly since St Richard's time; their main function is to be involved with legal and practical matters concerning visitations, clergy care, discipline matters, faculties and quinquennial inspections.

The Diocese of Chichester almost exactly covers the two counties of East Sussex and West Sussex and the City of Brighton and Hove, stretching for nearly a hundred miles (160 km) along the south coast of England. The diocese has four archdeaconries, namely the Archdeaconry of Horsham, the Archdeaconry of Hastings, the Archdeaconry of Brighton and Lewes as well as the Archdeaconry of Chichester.

From its creation, in the 12th century until 2002, the Archdeacon of Chichester was actually based in Chichester. In 2002 during Archdeacon McKittrick's tenure, the base was moved to Church House, Hove, East Sussex. It returned to Chichester, following the appointment of Luke Irvine-Capel, in May 2019.

== List of archdeacons ==
=== High Medieval ===
Sole archdeacons:

- bef. 1118–aft. 1118: Ricoard (Note: These archdeacons are not referred to as Archdeacon of Chichester, but rather appear to be the sole archdeacon in the diocese.)
- bef. 1122–aft. 1123: Henry
- 11th century: Roger
- ?–aft. 1147: Robert

Senior archdeacons:

- bef. 1157–aft. 1172: Henry (Note: These archdeacons are not referred to as Archdeacon of Chichester, but are each the senior of two concurrent archdeacons of the diocese.)
- bef. 1172–1178 (res.): Seffrid II
- bef. 1180–aft. 1180: Matthew of Chichester
- c. 1181–aft. 1192: Peter
- aft. 1192–bef. 1197: Richard

Archdeacons of Chichester:

- bef. 1198–aft. 1213: Silvester
- bef. 1220–aft. 1229: William Durand
- bef. 1232–aft. 1234: William
- bef. 1235–aft. 1239: Walter
- bef. 1242–aft. 1246: John Climping
- bef. 1247–aft. 1256: John de Reigate
- 1259–aft. 1275: Geoffrey de Gates
- bef. 1287–bef. 1289: Robert of Wiston
- bef. 1300–aft. 1307: Gervase of Séez

=== Late Medieval ===
- bef. 1311–bef. 1340 (d.): Robert Leyset/de Leycester
- bef. 1346–1350 (d.): John Langley
- May 1350–aft. 1350: Adam de Houton
- bef. 1354–24 December 1356 (exch.): Simon de Bredon
- 24 December 1356 – 7 March 1357 (exch.): Walter de Alderbury
- 7 March 1357–?: John de Sculthorpe
- 1358–1359: John Pipe
- 1366: Robert de Walton
- ?–bef. 1370 (d.): Henry Folvyle
- 3 July 1370 – 15 April 1382 (exch.): William Wardene/Wardieu
- 15 April 1382 – 3 May 1395 (exch.): Simon Russell
- 5 June 1388–?: Lambert Threkingham (ineffective royal grant)
- 3 May 1395–bef. 1413 (d.): John Thomas
- 1398: William Read
- 18 December 1404–?: Thomas Harlyng (mistaken collation)
- 13 November 1413–bef. 1440: John Lindfield/Lyndefeld
- ?–1439 (exch.): John Faukes
- 5 December 1440–bef. 1444 (res.): William Walesby
- 7 February 1444–bef. 1460 (d.): William Normanton
- 1454: Simon de Gredon/Gredon
- bef. 1459–bef. 1464: John Sprever
- bef. 1464–bef. 1478 (res.): John Doget
- bef. 1478–bef. 1481 (res.): Peter Huse/Husy
- 1 September 1481 – 1482 (res.): Henry Boleyn
- bef. 1484–bef. 1494 (d.): John Coke/Cooke
- bef. 1495–bef. 1509 (d.): Gerard Borrett/Burrell
- 18 April 1509–bef. 1512 (res.): Robert Chapel
- 4 April 1512–bef. 1532: William Norbury
- 2 February 1532–bef. 1554: John Worthiall

=== Early modern ===
- 16 April 1555–bef. 1559 (deprived): Alban Langdale
- 7 October 1559–?: Richard Tremayne (ineffective royal grant)
- 20 May 1560–bef. 1571 (d.): Thomas Spencer
- July 1571–bef. 1575 (res.): John Coldwell
- 15 May 1575–bef. 1580 (res.): Thomas Gillingham
- April 1580–bef. 1586 (res.): John Langworth
- 15 November 1586–March 1596 (d.): William Stone
- 12 April 1596 – 30 March 1603 (d.): Henry Ball
- 7 September 1603–bef. 1607 (d.): Thomas Pattenson
- 17 February 1608–bef. 1635 (d.): Roger Andrewes
- 24 November 1635–bef. 1640 (d.): Laurence Pay
- 18 February 1640 – 1641 (res.): James Marsh
- bef. 1642–25 April 1660 (d.): Henry Hammond
- 2 July 1660 – 6 December 1672 (d.): Jasper Mayne
- 23 December 1672–bef. 1679 (d.): Oliver Whitby
- 24 September 1679–bef. 1707 (d.): Josiah Pleydell
- 12 February 1708 – 17 August 1736 (d.): James Barker
- 7 September 1736 – 14 July 1770 (d.): Thomas Ball
- 10 June 1771 – 1 August 1792 (d.): Thomas Hollingbery
- 3 October 1792 – 1797 (res.): John Buckner
- 15 May 1802 – 10 September 1803 (d.): Charles Alcock
- 12 October 1803 – 4 January 1808 (d.): Thomas Taylor
- 5 March 1808–bef. 1840 (res.): Charles Webber
- 30 December 1840 – 21 March 1851 (res.): Henry Edward Manning (became Archbishop of Westminster in the Roman Catholic Church)
- 28 April 1851 – 26 March 1879 (d.): James Garbett

=== Late modern ===
- 1879–31 October 1887 (d.): John Russell Walker
- 1887–9 May 1903 (d.): Francis Mount
- 1903–1914 (res.): Edward Elwes
- 1914–19 February 1920 (d.): Herbert Jones (also Bishop of Lewes)
- 1920–1934 (ret.): Benedict Hoskyns
- 1934–1946 (ret.): Charles Clarke
- 1946–1973 (ret.): Lancelot Mason
- 1973–1975 (res.): Frederick Kerr-Dineen
- 1975–1981 (res.): Richard Eyre
- 1981–1991 (ret.): Keith Hobbs
- 1991–2002 (ret.): Michael Brotherton
- 2002 – 1 July 2018 (ret.): Douglas McKittrick
- 1 May 2018 – 9 May 2019 Mark Standen & David Twinley (Initially shadowed previous Archdeacon, then jointly acting) (Note: Standen and Twinley's appointment is from 1 May 2018 to 31 January 2019.)
- 9 May 2019 – 27 February 2025 Luke Irvine-Capel (became Bishop of Richborough)
- 28 September 2025 – present: Tom Carpenter

== See also ==
- Chichester Cathedral
- Diocese of Chichester
- Deans of Chichester
- Selsey Abbey

== Sources ==
- Baggs, A.P.; et al. (1980). Baker, T. F. T.; Elrington, C.R. (eds.). "Friern Barnet: Churches". A History of the County of Middlesex: Volume 6: Friern Barnet, Finchley, Hornsey with Highgate. Institute of Historical Research.
- Bartlett, Robert (2000). J. M. Roberts (ed.). England Under the Norman and Angevin Kings 1075 -1225. London: OUP. ISBN 978-0-19-925101-8.
- Chichester Diocese. "Chichester Diocese Website". Diocese of Chichester.
- General Synod (1997). Synodical Government in the Church of England. London: Church House Publishing. ISBN 0-7151-3806-5.
- Greenway, Diana E. (1996), Fasti Ecclesiae Anglicanae 1066–1300, vol. 5, pp. 20–23
- Hennessy, George (1900). Chichester Diocese Clergy Lists: Clergy Succession from the earliest time to the year 1900. London: St Peters Press.
- Hobbs, Mary, ed. (1994). Chichester Cathedral: An Historic Survey. Chichester: Phillimore. ISBN 0-85033-924-3.
- Horn, Joyce M. (1964), Fasti Ecclesiae Anglicanae 1300–1541, vol. 7, pp. 11–13
- Horn, Joyce M. (1971), Fasti Ecclesiae Anglicanae 1541–1857, vol. 2, pp. 15–17
- Stephens, W. R. W. (1881). The South Saxon Diocese, SELSEY - CHICHESTER. London: SPCK.
- The Argus. "The Argus, Brighton and Hove". The Argus.
