= XTC (Elgar) =

Song by Edward Elgar

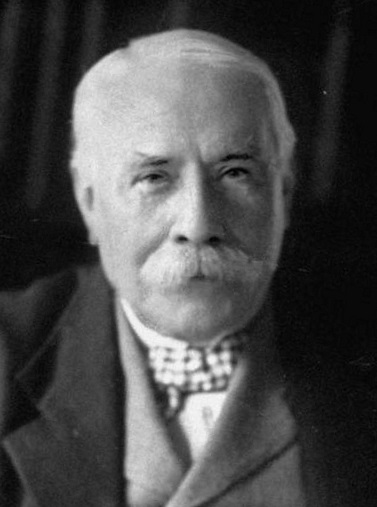
Edward Elgar in 1931

"XTC" ("Ecstasy") is a song with words and music written by the English composer Edward Elgar in 1930. It was his last song and written for the soprano Joan Elwes.

Elgar's sketches for the accompanying music were written separately from the words. At the end of the sketches he wrote "Fine del songs November 11th 1930". The song was pieced together by the pianist-musicologist David Owen Norris from sketches he found at the composer's birthplace.

The first performance was on the 150th anniversary of the composer's birth, 2 June 2007, at the Royal Academy of Music in London, sung by soprano Amanda Pitt, accompanied by David Owen Norris.

== Lyrics ==
XTC

I gave my heart unto my love
As we passed across the dark, mysterious forest rast
The daylight faded and above
Ah! the sunset flam-ed down to gild the past.
Oh, my love! Oh, my life, dost thou remember?
My belov-ed? that dark December?
My heart with rapture o'erflow'd
My very inmost soul was waken'd,
We leaned against each other in the moon-light
Darkness came upon us, oh, lovely night.
We were lost then but ah! awaking!
Our hearts and souls were all aflame
As the forest deep unfolded us again.

== Recordings ==
- Songs & Piano Music by Edward Elgar has "XTC" performed by Amanda Pitt (soprano), with David Owen Norris playing Elgar's original 1844 Broadwood piano.
