= Frederick Kerr-Dineen =

Frederick George Kerr-Dineen was an Anglican priest in the 20th century.

He was born on 26 August 1915 and educated at St John's College, Durham. He was ordained in 1941 and was a curate at St Paul's Portman Square and St John's Weymouth. In 1952 he married Hermione Iris MacDonald. He held incumbencies at St Michael's Blackheath Park and Holy Trinity, Eastbourne before being appointed Archdeacon of Chichester in 1973. Two years later he became the first Archdeacon of Horsham, retiring from the position in 1983 and as Rector of Stopham and Hardham in 1987. He died on 6 July 1988.

== Notes ==
Church of England titles
Preceded by Lancelot Mason	Archdeacon of Chichester; 1973 – 1975	Succeeded by Richard Montague Stephens Eyre
Preceded by Inaugural appointment	Archdeacon of Horsham; 1975 – 1983	Succeeded by William Charles Leonard Filby
