= The Cybersmile Foundation =

Anti-cyberbullying organization

- Founded: 2010
- Type: International Nonprofit Organization
- Purpose: Cyberbullying, mental health, emotional support, education, research, equality, inclusion, diversity
- Location: London, England, U.K.; Palo Alto, California, U.S., New York, U.S.
- Region served: Worldwide
- Website: www.cybersmile.org

The Cybersmile Foundation is an international nonprofit organization committed to tackling all forms of cyberbullying and digital abuse. They promote kindness, diversity, and inclusion through professional support services, education programs, awareness campaigns and corporate partnerships.

Launched in 2010, The Cybersmile Foundation is a registered U.K. charity and a registered 501(c)3 nonprofit organization in the United States. Its main headquarters are in London, Palo Alto and New York.

== Activities ==
=== Support ===
The Cybersmile Foundation operates a Global Support Service which provides internet users with support for cyberbullying and online abuse related problems around the world. Cybersmile support advisors are trained volunteers and most have been targeted by cyberbullying themselves.

=== Education ===
The Cybersmile Foundation provides online educational resources covering topics including cyberbullying, doxing, netiquette, mental health, gaming, online security and digital citizenship.

The organization provides educational content for schools. Cybersmile Ambassadors also participate in workshops and give talks to children about the dangers of cyberbullying.

In November 2017, Cybersmile Parenting and Youth Development Advisor Dr. Deborah Gilboa organized a TedxYouth conference in Pittsburgh to discuss new ideas and the impact of the internet on young people. A number of speakers participated in the event including author and educational speaker Cindy Pierce, discussing themes around building social courage.

=== Advisory ===
In December 2012, Britain's Crown Prosecution Service issued guidelines on how cases of cyberbullying will be assessed under existing laws. The Cybersmile Foundation was consulted as part of the development of the guidelines.

In September 2017, Cybersmile announced the launch of its Advisory Panel with a number of industry experts in fields such as gaming, education, research, internet law and technology.

In October 2017, Cybersmile was invited to participate in Disney-ABC's #ChooseKindness initiative for National Bullying Prevention Awareness Month. Cybersmile representative Laura Lewandowski discussed teen mental health and the organization's work with news anchor Cheryl Jennings as part of ABC7's "Beyond the Headlines" roundtable special.

=== Gaming ===
The Cybersmile Foundation provides online support to gamers and streamers affected by abuse and harassment online. The organization also regularly participates in Esports events and live streamed gaming marathons during the year.

In September 2015, Cybersmile launched a Gaming Support Center featuring video game specific help and support resources as well as a dedicated blog and news feeds from industry professionals.

In November 2015 at the Intel Masters Extreme event in San Jose, Mark Cuban delivered a number of "f-bombs" during an interview where he was fined a total of $30,000. This was donated to Cybersmile and an additional $38,000 was raised during a League of Legends match.

In May 2017, Cybersmile participated in a live Q and A at the London Comic Con with ESL, discussing support services available to gamers. "The Cybersmile Olympics" was streamed live and included a fundraiser where viewers could donate.

In August 2017, Cybersmile in partnership with Riot Games launched the League of Legends High School Club initiative in Australia and New Zealand. The project aimed to cultivate good sportsmanship with young students and helped them to learn new skills while encouraging positive school culture.

In July 2018, Michael Hicks, a developer from St Louis launched a game on Xbox, PS4 and Steam called The Path of Motus, partnering with The Cybersmile Foundation and donating 10 percent of the game's proceeds.

In April 2019, Mixer, Microsoft's game streaming platform and Cybersmile launched a partnership to address cyberbullying, announcing their joint Unawareness Movement campaign.

=== Cybersmile Assistant ===
In October 2018, The Cybersmile Foundation in partnership with Rimmel announced the development of a new virtual AI assistant that will help people affected by online abuse and provide resources to users in English speaking countries around the world.

Cybersmile Assistant will recommend helplines, organizations and articles, providing localized information to best serve each individual user wherever they are in the world.

In March 2019, Cybersmile Assistant was launched and received support from renowned experts and organizations including Dr. Charles Sophy, Medical Director for the County of Los Angeles Department of Children and Family Services, the Born This Way Foundation and Carol Todd, mother of suicide victim Amanda Todd and founder of the Amanda Todd Legacy Society.

== Research ==
To coincide with Stop Cyberbullying Day 2015, Cybersmile released original research carried out in partnership with Sugarscape, examining current teen attitudes towards online bullying and social media.

The report revealed that 55% had been cyberbullied while 35% admitted to having suffered up to five separate incidents of online abuse.

In June 2017, Cybersmile released original research carried out across the United States and in the United Kingdom with 50,000 respondents. The survey focused on bystander experiences and internet behaviors. Topics included racism, homophobia, harassment, religion and social media abuse.

== Professional memberships ==
Cybersmile is a founding member of the Twitter Trust & Safety Council set up to help maintain free expression. It is also a member of the All-Party Parliamentary Group on Bullying in the UK and a member of the UK Council for Child Internet Safety.

== Campaigns ==
=== Body Positivity ===
The Cybersmile Foundation launched an online campaign with communications agency Adam&EveDDB to address online bullying and harassment on social media while promoting body positivity.

Instagram influencer Chessie King participated in the campaign where a series of images and a video were released on her channel, altered live as she received comments of abuse to show social media users how their words were distorting her. The video was compiled showing King's transformation into an unrecognizable version of herself. The campaign received international news coverage and won a number of awards including a Gold Lion at the 2018 Cannes Lions International Festival of Creativity.

=== #TweetForACause ===
Twitter chose Cybersmile as its launch partner for its inaugural #TweetForACause initiative, driving awareness of the organization's mission to address cyberbullying and online abuse.

Cybersmile along with creator network Niche, coordinated a global call-to-action with a number of Internet personalities including Josh Peck, King Bach, Sara Hopkins, Us The Duo, Matt Cutshall and Trey Kennedy. Participants were invited to use the #TweetForACause hashtag to share their messages on Twitter in support of Cybersmile.

=== Hope's Story ===
The Cybersmile Foundation partnered with Pixelberry Studios on role-playing game High School Story. The game, in which players can create and run their own high school featured Hope's Story, a collaborative storyline developed by Cybersmile and the writing team at Pixelberry Studios around the theme of cyberbullying to educate the young players of the game. Branded in-game products could be purchased to support Cybersmile's work.

During the campaign, Cybersmile teamed up with music band One Direction and announced a giveaway which included unique items and tickets to a concert at the Rose Bowl in Pasadena on the Where We Are Tour.

In total, 4 million young players were educated by the campaign around the dangers of cyberbullying. Pixelberry Studios pledged to raise $100,000 for Cybersmile in 2014 but ended up raising over $300,000.

=== Give Blood and Fight Cyberbullying ===
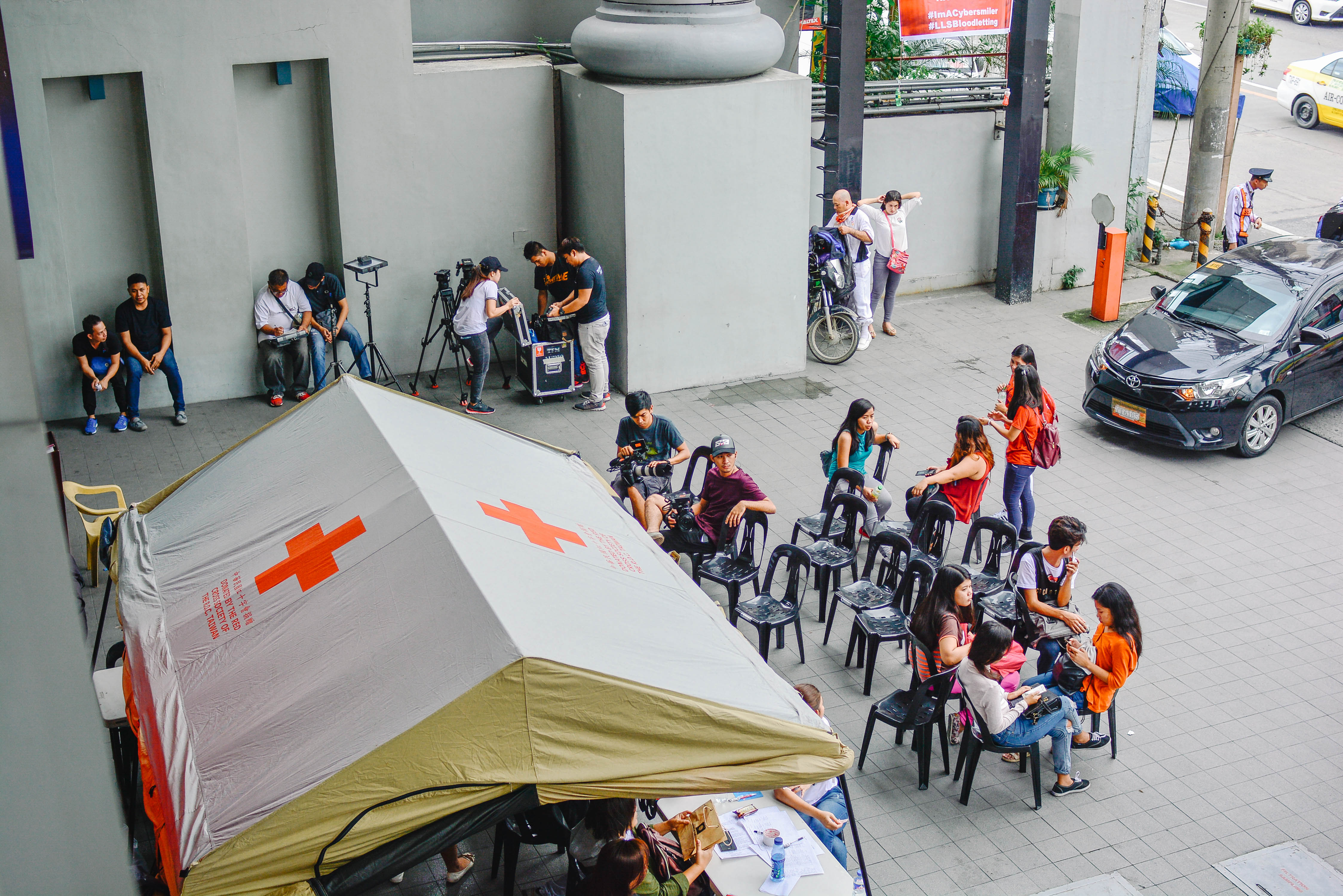
People waiting to register as donors for the blood drive in Manila with the Philippine Red Cross, November 2017.

Cybersmile and the Philippine Red Cross teamed up on a national incentive across The Philippines to donate blood in order to save lives and raise awareness of cyberbullying and internet trolling. Internet users were invited to use the #ImACybersmiler hashtag to share their positive memes.

=== The Filtered Life ===
Teaming up with NBA star Stephen Curry and Brita, Cybersmile launched an initiative and a "Filter Your Feed" tool to help users screen out the negativity online.

The campaign was launched with a PSA which featured Stephen Curry and guest speakers addressing online abuse and harassment online. Brita pledged to donate $1 for every negative comment deleted or positive post created using the #FilterYourFeed hashtag. Stephen Curry also appeared on The Late Late Show with James Corden and highlighted the campaign on Carpool Karaoke.

The campaign garnered 200 million impressions from social media and traditional outlets.

=== #IWillNotBeDeleted ===
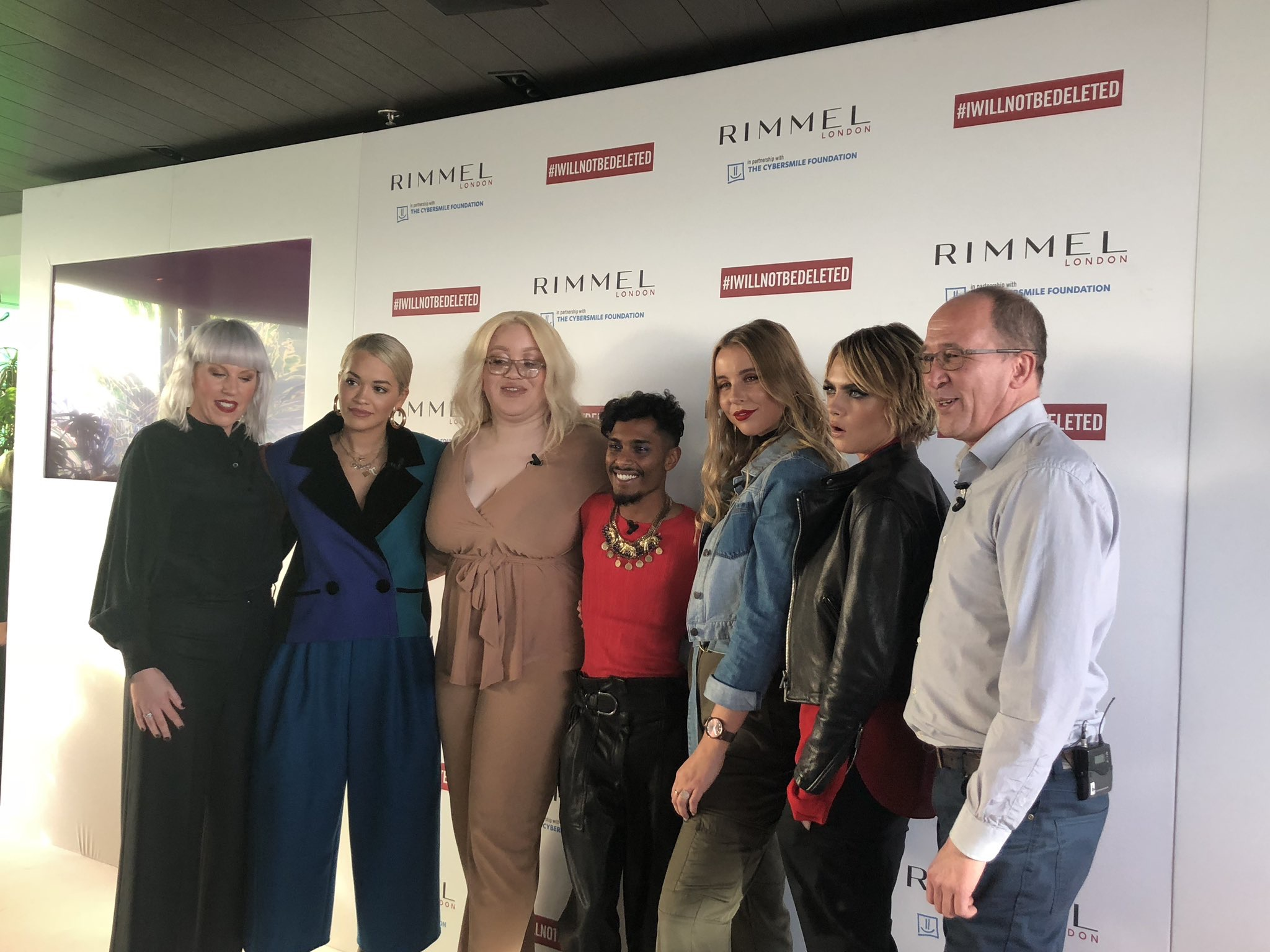
Cybersmile and Rimmel photocall during the #IWILLNOTBEDELETED campaign press conference (from right to left: Cybersmile Co-Founder Daniel Raisbeck, Cara Delevingne, Chessie King, Anthony Pius, Joanne Dion, Rita Ora)

Cybersmile and Rimmel launched a global campaign to tackle beauty cyberbullying with a PSA featuring prominent bloggers, campaigners and celebrities including Rita Ora and Cara Delevingne.

In an interview with Glamour, Rita Ora stated that "We both have experienced cyberbullying in certain degrees and I think that it's vital to spread the message that it's a real thing. Anxiety, cyberbullying, people doing things to themselves because of bullying - it's uncalled for."

=== The UnAwareness Movement ===
Mixer, Microsoft's game streaming platform and Cybersmile launched the UnAwareness Movement to raise awareness of toxicity and the impact of cyberbullying on Internet users while encouraging positive online behaviors. This involved a month-long campaign where gamers on Xbox, the Mixer app and Mixer could support the movement and purchase Embers, a virtual currency that unlocked anti-cyberbullying themed skills on Mixer streamer channels.

=== Stop Cyberbullying Day ===
Each year on the 3rd Friday of June, Cybersmile coordinates Stop Cyberbullying Day, a global day of awareness to encourage positive digital citizenship. Stop Cyberbullying Day engages with internet users, brands, influencers, health organizations and governments to promote a kinder, brighter internet.

In 2018, The Cybersmile Foundation received the support of more than 700 influencers for the Stop Cyberbullying Day Thunderclap campaign, which reached over 100 million internet users. Celebrities including Zoella, Celine Dion and William Shatner were among the supporters of the day.

In 2019, Stop Cyberbullying Day was backed by leaders, celebrities and organizations including Pope Francis, Cara Delevingne, Rita Ora, Little Mix, UNICEF, WE Charity, Hockey Canada, Rimmel London, The Department For Education and Twitter.

== Partnerships ==
Cybersmile have announced various partnerships with brands around the world including Microsoft, Brita, Riot Games, Twitter, ESL, Rainbow, Intel, WWE, Rimmel, Claire's and Pixelberry Studios.

In May 2014, The Cybersmile Foundation became a media partner of Sugarscape, an online teen magazine.

In August 2014, Twitter announced a long-term partnership with Cybersmile to promote digital citizenship and educate users about being safe online. As part of the partnership, a new verified Twitter help channel @AskCybersmile was created to provide support to users on the platform, which is also listed in Twitter's Trusted Resource area.

In January 2015, Intel launched the ‘Diversity in Technology' initiative, announcing a number of charitable partners including The Cybersmile Foundation. The company pledged $300 million over several years to increase inclusivity in the gaming industry and provide support for female gamers.

In October 2015, The Body Shop Foundation announced its support for Cybersmile to help fund and create over 80 downloadable digital programs, educating people about cyberbullying and online safety worldwide.

In October 2016, Cybersmile were chosen by Riot Games for their "Impact Challenge" which would help the organization provide education for gamers around the topics of teamwork, resilience and mental wellbeing.

In March 2017, WWE and Cybersmile announced a partnership to encourage diversity and inclusion online to help people affected by negativity and support their wellbeing. A number of WWE Superstars including Cesaro, Dolph Ziggler and WWE's Chief Brand Officer, Stephanie McMahon took part in a PSA that coincided with the announcement.

In April 2017, The Cybersmile Foundation announced a partnership with Brita to support a more diverse, inclusive and caring community. Brita donated $80,000 to the organization to support its work.

In October 2018, The Cybersmile Foundation and Coty announced a new initiative with cosmetics brand Rimmel to tackle beauty cyberbullying and develop a new AI tool. A campaign entitled #IWILLNOTBEDELETED was launched to coincide with the announcement which featured a number of prominent bloggers and celebrities.

In March 2019, Cybersmile and Microsoft announced an anti-cyberbullying partnership to help raise funds for the organization's new AI smart assistant with game streaming platform Mixer. This was part of an initiative called "The UnAwarenss Movement" that would bring together communities to support positivity in gaming.

== Awards and nominations ==
The Cybersmile Foundation has received a number of awards and nominations for its charitable work and campaigns.

- The Argus Achievement Awards 2012 – Charity of the Year
- Chime Communications PLC Graduate Scheme 2012 – Winner
- TalkTalk Digital Heroes Awards 2013 – Winner
- Charity Times UK Charity Awards 2013 – Best New Charity – Highly Commended
- Games For Good Award 2017 – Nominated by the Shorty Awards
- The Immortal Awards - Finalist 2018 - Body Positivity Campaign
- Clio Awards Bronze - Best Social Media Campaign 2018 - Body Positivity Campaign
- Cannes Bronze Lion – Social Trends 2018 - Body Positivity campaign
- Cannes Silver Lion – Social Purpose 2018 - Body Positivity campaign
- Cannes Gold Lion – Social Influencer/Talent 2018 - Body Positivity campaign
- Campaign Big Awards - Best Charity Campaign 2018 - Body Positivity Campaign
- British Arrows – Most Innovative Use of Video 2019 - Body Positivity campaign
- British Arrows – Best Social Video 2019 - Body Positivity campaign
- British Arrows – Charity & Public Service 2019 - Body Positivity campaign
- The One Club Award - Gold 2019 - Winner
- The One Club Award - Best of Social Influencer Marketing 2019

== Celebrity Support ==
The Cybersmile Foundation works with a wide range of celebrity and influencer supporters who help to promote their mission for a more inclusive internet. Celebrity supporters that have participated in initiatives include: Celine Dion, Paige Spiranac, Stephen Curry, Normani, Fifth Harmony, William Shatner, David Hasselhoff, Johnny Orlando, Lauren Orlando, Krista Allen, Danielle Peazer, Becky Lynch, Cesaro, Kofi Kingston, Dolph Ziggler, The Big Show, Kathryn Bernardo, Daniel Padilla, Katie Cassidy, Jordyn Jones, Kenzie Ziegler, Audrina Patridge, Meghan Trainor, One Direction, 5 Seconds of Summer, Jake Zyrus, Richard Armitage, Zoella, Stephen Fry, Charlotte Crosby, Elle Sefton-Thorley and Chessie King.

In June 2015, Fifth Harmony were announced as official Ambassadors for Cybersmile.

In September 2016, The Cybersmile Foundation announced Normani as their Diversity Ambassador. The singer had faced racial abuse on social media and wanted to promote a message of inclusion to her fans and support the charity's mission.

In February 2017, The Cybersmile Foundation announced Golfer Paige Spiranac as an Ambassador. Spiranac has participated in a number of initiatives for the charity. She has also highlighted her struggle with online abuse and why she chose to support Cybersmile in her exclusive feature with Sports Illustrated.

In October 2018, Rita Ora and Cara Delevingne raised awareness of Cybersmile's mission addressing the issues surrounding beauty cyberbullying and online abuse.

=== Cybersmile Ambassadors ===
- Fifth Harmony
- Richard Armitage
- Stephanie Harvey
- Daniel Padilla
- Kathryn Bernardo
- Paige Spiranac
- Normani Kordei
- Krista Allen
- Katie Cassidy
- Jake Zyrus
- Johnny Orlando
- Lauren Orlando

=== Patrons ===
- Ali Campbell
- Air Commodore M T Doel
- Sal Brinton
- Carol Theobald
- Helen Hyde
- Geoffrey Theobald
- Polly Toynbee
- Candy Morris
- Susan Pyper
- Tony Baldry
- Baroness Stedman-Scott
- Lord Ramsbotham
- Lord Taylor of Warwick
- Beaumont L Brandie
- Elish Angiolini
- Richard Bridgeman, 7th Earl of Bradford
- Robin Bridgeman, 3rd Viscount Bridgeman
- Douglas McKittrick
- Christopher Portman, 10th Viscount Portman
