= Donhead St Andrew =

Village in Wiltshire, England

Coordinates: 51.022°N 2.121°W

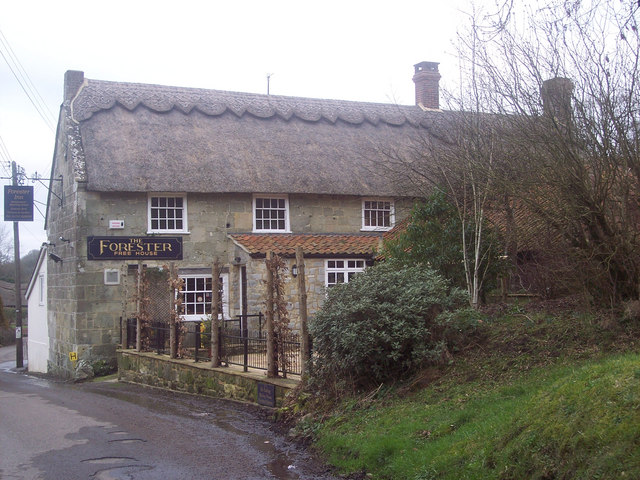
- The Forester

- Location within Wiltshire
- Population: 413 (in 2011)
- OS grid reference: ST916247
- Civil parish: Donhead St Andrew
- Unitary authority: Wiltshire
- Ceremonial county: Wiltshire
- Region: South West
- Country: England
- Sovereign state: United Kingdom
- Post town: Shaftesbury
- Postcode district: SP7
- Dialling code: 01747
- Police: Wiltshire
- Fire: Dorset and Wiltshire
- Ambulance: South Western
- UK Parliament: Salisbury
- Website: Parish Council

Donhead St Andrew is a village and civil parish in Wiltshire, England, on the River Nadder. It lies 4 miles (6.4 km) east of the Dorset market town of Shaftesbury. The parish includes the hamlets of West End, Milkwell and (on the A30) Brook Waters. In 2011 the parish has a population of 413.

Ferne House, on the site of a former manor house, is within the parish.

== History ==
Donhead St Andrew and its neighbour Donhead St Mary were once part of a single Donhead estate. By c. 1200 Donhead St Andrew had a church, and the 'St Andrew' suffix was in use in 1240.

The Wardour estate occupies the northeast of the parish. Wardour Castle, built in the 1390s and now known as Old Wardour Castle, straddles the boundary with Tisbury parish. South of the castle stands Old Wardour House, built for the Arundells in the 17th century after the partial destruction of the castle in the Civil War. New Wardour Castle, a large country house begun in 1769, is nearby in Tisbury parish.

The ridgeway which enters the parish from the east at White Sheet Hill (not to be confused with Whitesheet Hill north of Mere) became part of the Salisbury-Exeter road, following the route of the present A30 towards Shaftesbury. By 1788 the present lower-level route was in use instead of the ridgeway.

A school was built near the church in 1835 and became a National School, then was rebuilt on the same site in 1880, to provide places for 100 children. The school closed in 1970.

Population of the parish peaked around the time of the 1841 census when 900 were recorded, then fell steadily until stabilising at around half that number in the mid-20th century.

== Church ==
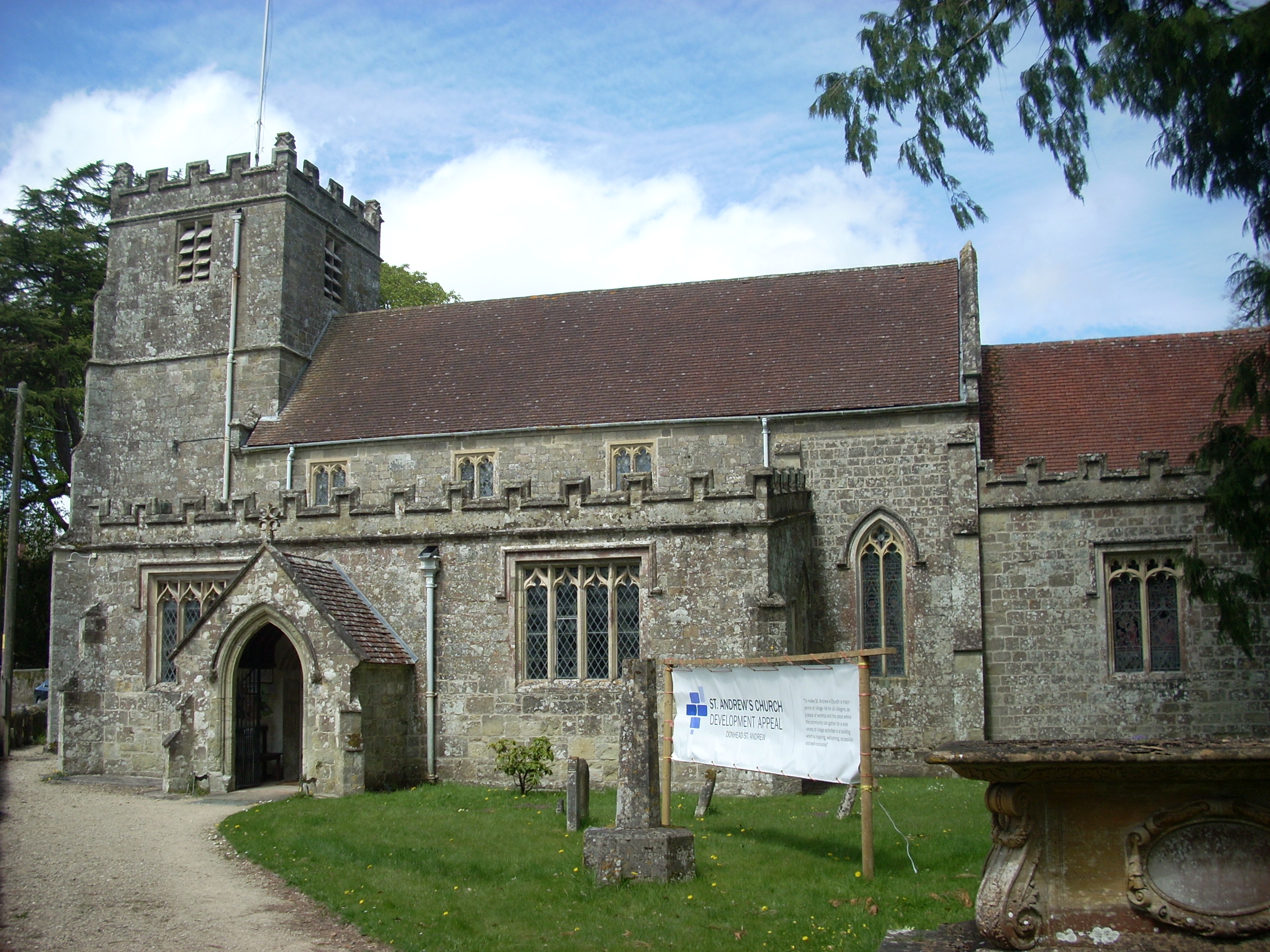
St Andrew's Church

The Anglican Church of St Andrew has 12th-century origins and was extended and remodelled in the 14th, 15th and 17th. Victorian restoration included the rebuilding of the chancel and tower. The tower has four bells, the oldest from the 15th century.

The poet William Lisle Bowles was a curate at the church until 1792. A wall tablet is a memorial to Captain John Cooke, a naval officer killed at the Battle of Trafalgar in 1805. Notable rectors include Charles Clarke in the 20th century.

The church was designated as Grade II* listed in 1966. In 1980 the benefice was united with Donhead St Mary and Charlton; today the parish is part of the Benefice of St Bartholomew.

Opposite the church stands Donhead House, a former rectory built in the early 18th century and enlarged in the early 20th for Sir James Pender, businessman and Member of Parliament.

== Local government ==
Donhead St Andrew has an elected parish council. It is in the area of Wiltshire Council unitary authority, which performs local government functions.

== Notable people ==
- Julian Bream (1933–2020), classical guitarist, lived in the parish from 2009 until his death.
- Kenneth Cooper (1905–1981), British Army officer, lived at West End House
