= Thomas Taylor (priest, 1757–1808) =

Thomas Taylor (1738/9–1808) was the Archdeacon of Chichester from his installation on 15 October 1803 until his death on 4 January 1808. He was an alumnus of St. John's College at the University of Oxford, where he matriculated on 8 February 1757, at the age of 18. He was Curate of St Andrew Holborn c.1762-1777 and became Rector of Wotton in Surrey in 1778 and Rector of Abinger in the same county in 1803, until his death. He was Professor of Law at Gresham College and an Honorary Chaplain to the King.

Family and Early Career: Thomas Taylor was baptised on 6th October 1738 at St Andrew Holborn, the eldest son of Jasper Taylor, a clockmaker in Fetter Lane (who became master and clerk of the Clockmakers’ Company) and Rachel née White. He married at St Andrew Holborn on 7th October 1773 Ann, daughter of Nathaniel Newnham and sister of Nathaniel Newnham (Mayor of London 1782-3). She died in 1779 and there were no children.

== Notes ==
Church of England titles
| Preceded by Charles Alcock | Archdeacon of Chichester; 1803–1808 | Succeeded by Charles Webber |
