= Joan Elwes =

English soprano and music teacher

Joan Izott Elwes (1895-1961) was an English soprano and music teacher.

== Biography ==
She was born in Woolbeding, West Sussex, daughter of Edward Elwes (1848-1930) and his wife, born Emily Fownes Somerville. Her father was educated at Eton and Oxford, and ordained in 1872, becoming Chancellor of Chichester Cathedral in 1914. She was a cousin of singer Gervase Elwes.

Elwes studied music in London: cello at the Royal College of Music and singing with the Polish tenor Jean de Reszke. She made her recital debut relatively late, at the age of 27, and continued to sing in recital and oratorio until the late 1930s. Elwes was one of Edward Elgar's favourite interpreters, and in October 1930 he dedicated a song to her It isnae me, and soon afterwards wrote for her his last song which he mysteriously called "XTC" ("Ecstasy").

Joan Elwes was a singing teacher (she enjoyed teaching children) and had a distinguished career as a recitalist, radio broadcaster and festival singer. She specialised in Bach and other early music. She was admired by composers Elgar and Vaughan Williams. She was described as having a voice "of considerable power, fresh and sweet".

A series of recitals she promoted in 1935 was devoted to the songs of Bach, and she gave few recitals after this. But in 1947 she sang five of Elgar's songs at a concert in London in aid of the Elgar Memorial Fund set up by the Elgar Birthplace Trustees.

=== Personal life ===
Joan Elwes married a lawyer, Lindsay Millais Jopling on 24 February 1931 and they had three children together. He was the son of painter Louise Jopling.
