= Stop Cyberbullying Day =

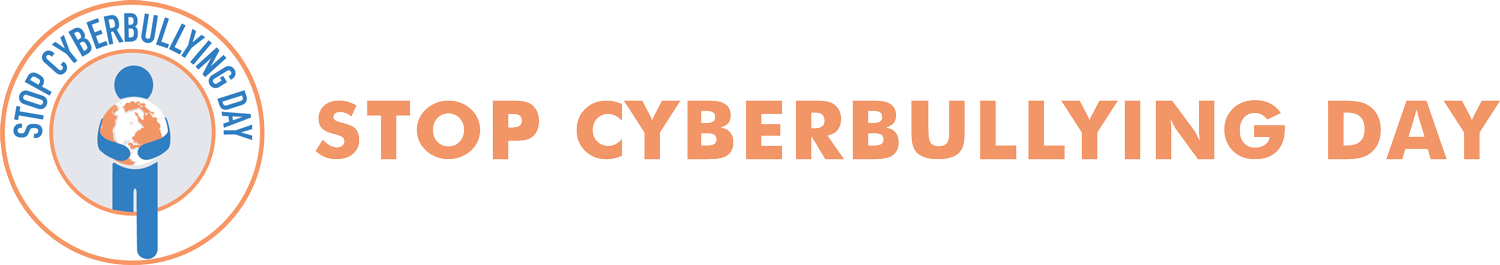
- Founded: 17 June 2012
- Location: Worldwide
- Website: stopcyberbullyingday.org

Stop Cyberbullying Day is an international awareness day launched by The Cybersmile Foundation on 17 June 2012, taking place on the third Friday of June annually. The day encourages people from around the world to show their commitment toward a truly inclusive and diverse online environment for all, without fear of personal threats, harassment or abuse.

The day brings together public figures, non-profit organizations, brands, governments and educational institutions who speak out against cyberbullying and abuse of any kind to defend the human right to freedom of speech and mutual respect. People show their support for the day by using the #STOPCYBERBULLYINGDAY hashtag on social media along with their message.

The next Stop Cyberbullying Day will be on 20 June 2025.

== Brand & media involvement ==
Brands such as Twitter, MTV, Telenor, ESL (eSports) and WWE have supported Stop Cyberbullying Day through public announcements, social media posts and celebrity engagements.

Telenor Group announced it would educate 4 million children in Asia by 2020 on Stop Cyberbullying Day through the launch of their "Be A Cyberhero" initiative.

McAfee pledged their support for Stop Cyberbullying Day and asked its customers to raise their voice and unite against cyberbullying.

The WWE released a series of videos to coincide with The Cybersmile Foundation's Stop Cyberbullying Day Public Service Announcement in 2017 with wrestlers such as The Big Show and Bayley encouraging internet users to be kind to one another.

Telus announced on Stop Cyberbullying Day that they would donate $1 for every pledge made as part of a nationwide initiative to support #EndBullying programs for youth in Canada with an aim to secure 1 million pledges.

SuperStroke launched a fundraiser in support of The Cybersmile Foundation with golfer Paige Spiranac on Stop Cyberbullying Day, donating 50% of proceeds of sales from limited edition putter grips.

== Research ==
To mark the day in 2012, The Cybersmile Foundation released research revealing that 92% of UK teachers had come across cyberbullying at some point during their career, with 78% revealing that they had personally experienced cyberbullying, whether directed at themselves, their students or other members of staff.

On Stop Cyberbullying Day 2017, a survey with 50,000 internet users in the U.S. and U.K. was released. The study explored bystander experiences of cyberbullying and online abuse.

== Public Service Announcement ==
In 2017, The Cybersmile Foundation released a PSA video on Stop Cyberbullying Day with a host of international stars calling for an end to cyberbullying. WWE Wrestlers Big Show, Bayley, teen YouTube stars Johnny Orlando and Lauren Orlando, Daniel Padilla, Kathryn Bernardo and Krista Allen were among the celebrities involved in the project.

== Thunderclap ==
In April 2018, The Cybersmile Foundation launched a Thunderclap campaign for Stop Cyberbullying Day to promote a kinder, more inclusive internet. The campaign was supported by a number of public figures, government departments and brands around the world including Katie Cassidy, Stephen Fry, Charles Sophy, Zoella, Jake Zyrus, UB40, Normani, Claire’s, TalkTalk Group, Barclays, Kingston Technology, ESL (eSports), Talking Tom, Born This Way Foundation, DCMS, Mental Health America and VH1.

On 15 June 2018, the campaign went live with a social reach of over 101 million internet users across Facebook and Twitter. The campaign promoted messages of diversity and inclusion online.

== In popular culture ==
At the 2015 Capital Summertime Ball, artists at the show including Little Mix, Nick Jonas, Jason Derulo, Camila Cabello, Kelly Clarkson and Carly Rae Jepsen shared their thoughts on how to deal with cyberbullying with Sugarscape ahead of Stop Cyberbullying Day during the Feel The Love Fortnight campaign.

David Hasselhoff, William Shatner, Celine Dion, One Direction, Charlotte Crosby and Mackenzie Ziegler are among a host of public figures who have participated in Stop Cyberbullying Day, contributing memes and tweets in support of the day.

== Celebrity Ambassadors ==
- Fifth Harmony
- Normani Kordei, a member of Fifth Harmony
- Richard Armitage (actor)
- Paige Spiranac
- Katie Cassidy
- Stephanie Harvey
- Krista Allen
- Big Show
- Bayley (wrestler)
- UB40
- Michael Rosenbaum
- Maya Stojan
- Gena Lee Nolin
- Charisma Carpenter
- Daniel Padilla
- Kathryn Bernardo
- Stephen "Snoopeh" Ellis
