= Lancelot Mason =

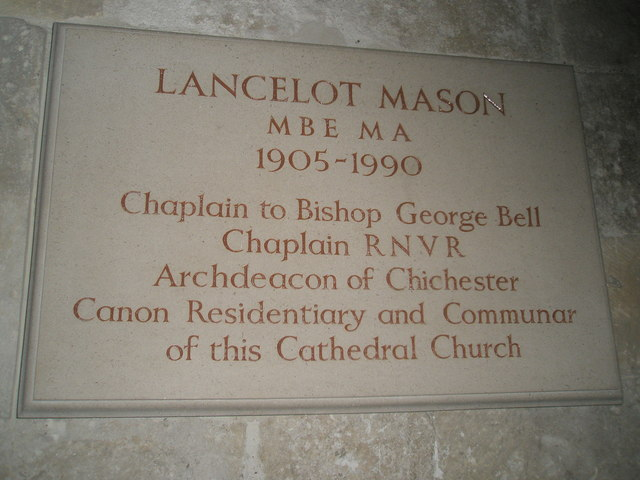
Tablet commemorating Lancelot Mason

The Ven Lancelot Mason MBE MA (22 July 1905 – 9 February 1990) was an eminent Church of England priest in the 20th century.

He was born on 22 July 1905 and educated at the RN College Osborne, RN College Dartmouth, and Trinity College, Cambridge. Ordained in 1929, he began his career with a curacy at Soham, after which he was Residential Chaplain to George Bell, Bishop of Chichester, until 1938. Next he was Rector of Plumpton with East Chiltington, and during the war was a Chaplain with the RNVR, and was Mentioned in Despatches before being appointed Archdeacon of Chichester in 1946. He additionally became a Canon Residentiary at the diocese's cathedral in 1949; and retired from both posts in 1973. He died on 9 February 1990.

== Notes ==
Church of England titles
| Preceded by Charles Philip Stewart Clarke | Archdeacon of Chichester; 1946–1973 | Succeeded by Frederick George Kerr-Dineen |
