= Luke Irvine-Capel =

British Anglican priest

The Right Reverend Luke Irvine-Capel SSC
- Bishop of Richborough (AEO)
- Diocese: Diocese of Canterbury
- In office: 27 February 2025 – present
- Predecessor: Norman Banks
- Previous post: Archdeacon of Chichester (2019–2025)

Orders
- Ordination: 1999 (deacon); 2000 (priest) by David Thomas
- Consecration: 27 February 2025 by Martin Warner

Personal details
- Born: 1975 (age 50–51) Dover, Kent, England
- Denomination: Anglican
- Residence: The Palace, Chichester
- Spouse: Ruth
- Children: 3
- Education: Greyfriars, Oxford

Luke Thomas Irvine-Capel SSC (né Capel; born 1975) is a British Church of England bishop serving as Bishop of Richborough since 2025 — as such he provides alternative episcopal oversight to Anglicans in the Eastern half of the Province of Canterbury who reject the ministry of women. He previously served as Archdeacon of Chichester in the Diocese of Chichester.

== Education and family ==
Luke Irvine-Capel was educated at Greyfriars, Oxford, graduating with a Bachelor of Arts (BA) degree in 1997: as per tradition, his BA was promoted to a Master of Arts (MA Oxon) in 2001. He trained for the priesthood at the College of the Resurrection, Mirfield, and undertook further studies at the University of Leeds, graduating with a Master of Arts (MA) degree.

He is married to Ruth, a teacher. They have three children. His son was a chorister at St Paul's Cathedral in London. In the summer of 2002, his surname changed from Capel to Irvine-Capel, following his marriage to Ruth Irvine, who also uses the surname Irvine-Capel.

== Ordained ministry ==
Irvine-Capel was ordained in the Church in Wales by David Thomas, Provincial Assistant Bishop, the Church's bishop specially appointed to minister to those who cannot accept the ordination of women: he was made deacon at Petertide 2000 (4 July) and ordained priest the Petertide next (2 July 2000). Both ordinations occurred at the Priory Church of St Mary, Abergavenny. He served his curacy at Abertillery, Cwmtillery, and Six Bells until 2001, then Minor Canon Precentor at Newport Cathedral until 2003.

In 2003, Irvine-Capel moved to become Rector of Cranford in the Diocese of London, Church of England. He took up the post of Vicar of St Gabriel's, Warwick Square in Pimlico in 2008. He moved to East Sussex in 2013, where he served as incumbent of Christ Church, St Leonards-on-Sea until 2019 (Priest-in-Charge until 2014, Rector thereafter). He was additionally Priest-in-Charge of Hastings (St Clement & All Saints) from 2017. Whilst serving as a parish priest in both the Diocese of London and the Diocese of Chichester, Irvine-Capel also served on many diocesan boards and committees.

It was announced on 6 January 2019 that Irvine-Capel would become Archdeacon of Chichester in the Diocese of Chichester. He was collated as archdeacon and installed a canon at Chichester Cathedral on 9 May 2019.

Irvine-Capel is a member of the Society of the Holy Cross (SSC), a society of male Anglo-Catholic priests who live under a common rule of life that informs their priestly ministry and charism.

=== Episcopal ministry ===
On 10 December 2024, the Church of England announced that Irvine-Capel had been appointed to be the next Bishop of Richborough, a suffragan bishop in the Province of Canterbury, providing Alternative Episcopal Oversight to traditionalist Anglo-Catholic parishes in the eastern side of the province that reject the ordination of women. In that post, he is to be based in the Diocese of Portsmouth. On the afternoon of 27 February 2025, he was consecrated as a bishop at Canterbury Cathedral. As with consecration of other traditionalist catholic bishops following the consecration of the first woman as a bishop in the Church of England, the act of consecration was delegated from the archbishop (in this case from Stephen Cotterell, Archbishop of York) to a traditional diocesan: Martin Warner, Bishop of Chichester, was the principal consecrator, assisted by Paul Thomas, Bishop of Oswestry, and Jonathan Baker, Bishop of Fulham.

== Styles ==
- Luke Thomas Capel Esquire (1975–1999)
- The Reverend Luke Thomas Capel SSC (1999–2002)
- The Reverend Luke Thomas Irvine-Capel SSC (2002–2019)
- The Venerable Luke Thomas Irvine-Capel SSC (2019–2025)
- The Right Reverend Luke Thomas Irvine-Capel SSC (2025–present)

Church of England titles
Preceded by Douglas McKittrick	Archdeacon of Chichester; 2019–2025	TBA
