= Surviving High School =

2005 video game

- Developers: Centerscore (mobile); EA Mobile
- Platforms: iOS, Android
- Release: April 30, 2005: iPhone/iPod Touch; WW: November 16, 2009 (discontinued) iPad; WW: July 12, 2011 (discontinued) Android; WW: December 22, 2011 Mobile phone; WW: April 30, 2005 (discontinued) Windows Mobile; WW: January 28, 2009 (discontinued) Nintendo DS; NA: April 19, 2010; PAL: April 30, 2010 (discontinued)
- Genre: Interactive fiction
- Mode: Single-player

Surviving High School was a visual novel game developed and published by Electronic Arts. It was originally released for mobile phones in 2005, later being made available for iPhone and iPod Touch in 2009 and for iPad and Android OS in 2011. New episodes were released and available for download on a weekly basis. It shared many similarities in terms of gameplay mechanics and visuals to its sister game, Cause of Death, which was also developed by EA Games. Some of the characters from Surviving High School later featured in the sister game, High School Story, by Pixelberry Studios. The character Autumn Brooks transferred out of Surviving High School's Centerscore High after having been bullied, and she featured prominently in High School Story alongside other characters with minor roles, such as Owen, Wes, and Kimi. This ties in with a bullying theme carried through High School Story and their partnership with The Cybersmile Foundation. Autumn's bullying storyline from Surviving High School enables her to help a student called Hope in High School Story, who is being cyberbullied; this storyline helps to raise awareness of the issues of bullying and cyberbullying in high school students.

On April 30, 2014, it was announced during one of the episodes that the game would be ending soon. The final episode was released on July 12, 2014.

== Gameplay ==
Surviving High School was a choice-based visual novel with elements of Choose your Own Adventure and interactive fiction. It followed Centerscore High, a typical high school with clear cliques of students. Players controlled several unique Centerscore students throughout the game. They are given scenarios where they must choose between two or more decisions that may negatively or positively affect the outcome of each story. Stories are presented through episodes, which are grouped within volumes or sets. Volumes typically contain around eight episodes. Prior to the September 2012 update, the game came with two free playable stories: "The Football Star" and "The New Girl". While both stories allowed the customization of the player character's name, only the former allowed the changing of appearance. All further content had to be purchased via the in-game store "More Episodes" or downloaded from the "Now Airing" feature.

The game received an update on September 5, 2012 that introduced a number of changes. It featured a brand new on demand section entitled "more episodes", and the Now Airing section was changed to "weekly free episodes". The update also replaced the original megapack with a new megapack entitled Season 1: A New Start. Additional content could be purchased in the in-game store known as "More Episodes", which offered previous episodes, continuations to "The Football Star" and "The New Girl" stories, premium content, special episodes, and classic Surviving High School Episodes. Every Thursday, a new episode was made available in the "More Episodes" section free of charge. However, these episodes could be purchased in advance from the "More Episodes" section.

== Reception ==
Reception

Aggregate score
Aggregator	Score
Metacritic	69/100 (DS)

Review scores
Publication	Score
GameSpot	7.4/10 (Mobile phone); 7.8/10 (iPhone)
IGN	6/10 (DSi)
Nintendo Life	8/10 (DSi)

Surviving High School received mixed-to-positive reviews. Nintendo Life praised its "cast of interesting and likeable characters", while criticizing its "tedious" gameplay. This sentiment was shared by IGN's review, which noted that the game "suffers a few frustrations" in its minigames.

== See also ==
- Cause of Death
- High School Story
