= James Marsh (priest) =

English Anglican priest

The Ven James Marsh, D.D. was an English Anglican priest in the 17th century.

Marsh was born in the City of London and educated at St Mary Hall, Oxford. He matriculated on 18 June 1610, aged 16. In 1613 he became a Fellow of Merton College, Oxford. In 1630 he became vicar of St Dunstan-in-the-West. He also held livings in Chingford and Cuckfield. He was Archdeacon of Chichester from 1640 to 1641. He died before 1646.
