= Oliver Whitby =

17th-century English Anglican priest

The Venerable Oliver Whitby (c. 1602 – 1679) was an Anglican priest in England during the 17th century, who became Archdeacon of Chichester.

== Origins and education ==
Born about 1602, the son of a clergyman in Bedfordshire, he entered Trinity College, Oxford, in 1619 and graduated BA in 1622, moving to Hart Hall where he gained an MA in 1624. Later, in 1643, he was awarded a BD by Trinity.

== Career ==
In 1642, as England sank into civil war, he was curate of the prosperous parish of Petworth in Sussex, where the Bishop of Chichester, Dr Henry King was rector. He reported that:

On Sunday last, being the 6 of June, in the administration of the Holy Communion, there happened a great uproar in the said church by some who are disobedient to the laws of the state and Church of England ....Those disturbers of God's peace and the King's, after 500 had received the sacrament kneeling, would force your petitioner to give it to them sitting, contrary to law … and thereupon made a great shout in the church, put on their hats, some crying: “Lay hands on him! Kick him out of the church! Pull him by the ears! Baal's priest, bald-pate, carry home your consecrated bread and sop your pottage!” Others thronged about him, laid hands on him, reviled him and laboured to hinder those who were willing to kneel, insomuch that God's holy ordinances were much dishonoured and many good Christians affrighted from the Holy Communion that day .... They threaten … if he will not give them the sacrament next Sunday as they please, they will drag him by the heels about the church.

Later, while preaching in Petworth church, he was shot at with a pistol. Though the ball missed him, he abandoned his position and hid in a modest house for six months. When tracked down by his opponents, for some days he hid in a hollow tree where his landlady brought him food on the pretence of gathering firewood. In danger and without income, it was not until the Restoration in 1660 that he was able to resume ecclesiastical duties.

He held incumbencies at St Nicholas Olave in the City of London and then at three parishes in Sussex: Ford in 1662; Climping in 1662; and Selsey in 1667. He was appointed to the prebend of Waltham in 1660, to the wardenship of the Hospital of St. Mary in Chichester in 1666, and became Archdeacon of Chichester in 1672.

He was buried in Chichester on 6 August 1679.

== Family ==
Around 1663, he married Ann Ford (1630-1691), daughter of John Ford (1606-1681) and his wife Anne Smith (died 1631). His wife was the widow of Benjamin Hyde and mother of Anne Hyde, great-grandmother of the naturalist, the Reverend Gilbert White. They had six children.

His eldest son, Oliver Whitby (1664-1703), became a lawyer in Chichester and died unmarried, leaving his money for the foundation of a school to educate poor boys from Chichester, from West Wittering, and from his mother's home parish of Harting. He specified the uniform they were to wear and the principal subjects they were to study – reading, writing, and mathematics. The school lasted until 1950.
