= Thomas Spencer (priest) =

English Anglican priest

Thomas Spencer (died 1571) was an English Anglican priest in the 16th century. He was the brother of William George Spencer and uncle of Herbert Spencer.

Spenser was educated at Magdalen College, Oxford. He held the livings at Hadleigh, Suffolk. He was Archdeacon of Chichester from 1560 until his death on 6 July 1571 in Hadleigh.
