= Thomas Gillingham =

English Anglican priest

Thomas Gillingham, D.D. was an English Anglican priest in the 16th century.

Gillingham was educated at Corpus Christi College, Oxford. He held livings in Colchester, Barkway and Wheldrake. Langridge became Rector of Barcombe and Archdeacon of Chichester in 1576.
