= Norman Banks (bishop) =

British bishop

The Right Reverend Norman Banks SSC
- Bishop of Richborough (AEO)
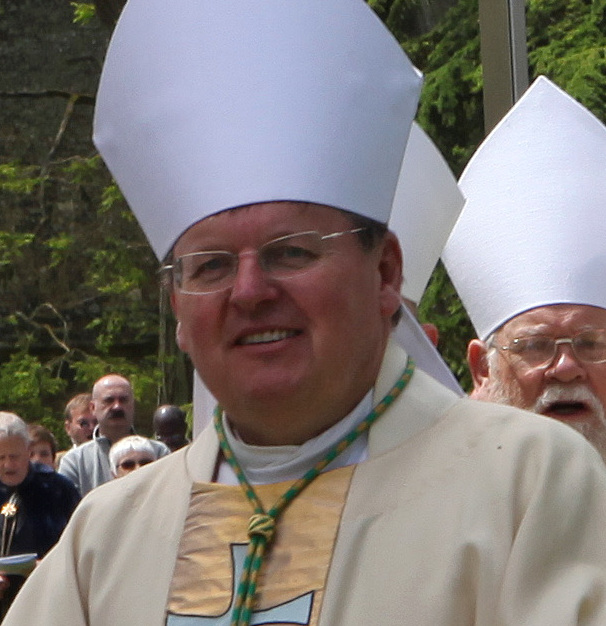
- Bishop Banks in 2012
- Diocese: Canterbury
- In office: 2011–2024
- Predecessor: Keith Newton
- Successor: Luke Irvine-Capel
- Other post: Vicar of Walsingham (2000–2011)

Orders
- Ordination: 1983
- Consecration: 16 June 2011 by Rowan Williams

Personal details
- Born: 4 April 1954 (age 72)
- Denomination: Anglican
- Education: Oriel College, Oxford

Norman Banks SSC (born 4 April 1954) is a retired Anglican bishop. From 2011 until 2024, he was the Bishop of Richborough, the provincial episcopal visitor for the eastern half of the Church of England Province of Canterbury.

== Early life ==
Banks was born on 4 April 1954 in Wallsend, Tyne and Wear, England. He was educated at Wallsend Grammar School. He studied at Oriel College, Oxford, graduating with a Bachelor of Arts (BA) degree in 1976; as per tradition, his BA was promoted to a Master of Arts (MA Oxon) degree in 1980. From 1979 to 1982, he trained for ordination at St Stephen's House, Oxford.

== Ordained ministry ==
Banks was ordained in the Church of England as a deacon in 1982 and as a priest in 1983. He was an assistant curate at Christ Church and St Ann's, Newcastle from 1982 to 1987 and then the parish's priest in charge until 1990. He was Vicar of St Paul's, Whitley Bay, from 1990 until 2000. He was then Vicar of Walsingham in the Diocese of Norwich between 2000 and his episcopal appointment in 2011.

=== Episcopal ministry ===
Banks was appointed the third Bishop of Richborough. On 16 June 2011, he was consecrated as a bishop at Southwark Cathedral by Rowan Williams, the Archbishop of Canterbury. As Bishop of Richborough, he is the provincial episcopal visitor for the eastern half of the Province of Canterbury. He acted as principal consecrator during the episcopal ordination of Will Hazlewood on 15 July 2020.

Banks is a member of the Council of Bishops of The Society.

In December 2023, it was announced that Banks would retire as Bishop of Richborough on Easter Sunday (31 March) 2024.

== Styles ==
- The Reverend Norman Banks (1982–2011)
- The Right Reverend Norman Banks (2011–present)

Church of England titles
Preceded by Keith Newton	Bishop of Richborough; 2011–2024	Succeeded by Luke Irvine-Capel
