= It isnae me =

"It isnae me" is a poem by Sally Holmes which was set to music by the English composer Edward Elgar in 1930.

The poem was first printed in Country Life magazine, and the song published in 1931 by Keith Prowse & Co. Ltd, London.

It was written at Elgar's home, "Marl Bank", near Worcester, and was dedicated to the soprano Joan Elwes, whom he had admired at Three Choirs Festival. The poem was performed by her in October 1930 at a concert in Dumfries, Scotland.

The poem is in the Scots language.

== Lyrics ==
It isnae me that's keerin'—or no' an awfu' lot,
But—it's sair, whiles, mindin' things ye thocht ye had forgot.
An' when wee Tam the Fiddler played 'The Lea Rig' doon the street,
I gie'd masel' a shock tae find that I wis near tae greet.

It isnae me that's keerin'—or no' for vera lang,
But—there's mony happy times awa' since last I heard yon sang.
An' someway—Och, I dinnae ken! I cannae say things richt—
I wish young Tam the Fiddler hadnae played yon sang last nicht.

=== Scots translations ===
- keerin' = grieving, complaining
- sair = sad
- whiles = meanwhile
- mindin' = remembering
- wee = little, young
- lea rig = meadow-ridge
- gie'd masel' = gave myself
- greet = cry
- awa' = ago
- dinnae ken = don't know

== Recordings ==
- "The Unknown Elgar" includes "It isnae me" performed by Teresa Cahill (soprano), with Barry Collett (piano).
- Songs and Piano Music by Edward Elgar has "It isnae me" performed by Mark Wilde (tenor), with David Owen Norris (piano).
