= John Worthiall =

English Anglican priest

John Worthiall, D.C.L. was an English Anglican priest in the 16th century.

Worthiall was Principal of New Inn Hall, Oxford from 1514 to 1520. He held livings in Sutton, West Sussex, Iping and Burwash. Worthiall was Archdeacon of Chichester from 1531 to 1554.
