= Episode (video game) =

2014 video game

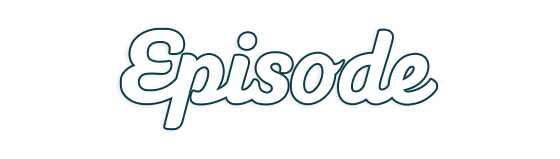
- Developer: Pocket Gems
- Platforms: Android; iOS
- Release: February 20, 2014
- Genre: Interactive fiction
- Mode: Single-player

Episode is an interactive fiction software and video game developed by Pocket Gems for mobile devices. It is a virtual storytelling network and platform that features interactive stories; users enter one of the stories and make choices as the storyline progresses. The product also has a user generated content creation platform that enables users to create their own stories.

== Gameplay and content creation ==
Gameplay screenshot of a story with the player able to make a choice in dialog

The game is structured as a visual novel, with many stories to choose from. Players customize their character, choosing their hair, makeup, and facial features. As the player progresses through the story, they are given action and dialogue choices that can influence the plot. Featured stories have micro-transactions that allow the player to unlock premium choices using in-game currency. Players have a set number of free chapters they can read each day, after which point they must purchase story packs to read more.

Community members can also create and publish their own stories for others to view. The app has its own proprietary scripting language that is designed to help users without animation or computer programming experience.

== Development and release ==
Developed by Pocket Gems of San Francisco, US, Episode launched in beta in 2013. It was released on February 20, 2014, on the Apple App Store, Google Play Store and Amazon Appstore, by which time already 10 million chapters had been played during the testing phase. There were some early controversies about inappropriate stories submitted to the platform; Daniel Terry, co-founder, and chief creative officer of Pocket Gems stated in an interview that the stories are directly monitored to flag inappropriate content and that the company will "always have a monitoring system in place" as the platform increases in scale.

Over the years the game has been updated with new gamemodes as well as collaborations with figures like Demi Lovato and movies such as Mean Girls.

== Reception ==
Episode has been highly popular. As of 2021, there have been over 150,000 individual narratives, with more than 9 billion views, and 12 million story creators. The platform has been well received among its content creators who have praised its diverse possibilities and potential for creativity through making stories.

=== Controversy ===
Despite the app being marketed to children, many of the stories available on the Episode app feature sexually suggestive elements. User-generated stories are filtered for profanity, but this process does not eliminate sexual themes.

== See also ==
- Choices: Stories You Play
