= High School Story =

2013 mobile simulation video game

- Developer: Pixelberry Studios
- Publisher: Pixelberry Studios
- Platforms: iOS, Android
- Release: September 13, 2013
- Genre: Simulation

High School Story was a mobile simulation game developed and published by Pixelberry Studios in September 13, 2013. The game served as a sister story to Surviving High School, as some recognizable characters from the latter (Autumn, Wes, Owen, Kimi) are either included into or simply make appearances in the former.

On June 4, 2018, Pixelberry Studios announced that it would be ending support for the game in the following weeks. On July 15, 2022, Pixelberry Studios announced that High School Story would have its servers permanently shut down on August 10, 2022.

== Gameplay ==
High School Story was a choice-based simulation game revolving around building a high school. To build up the school, the player completed quests, obtained classmates of various cliques, and purchased hangouts for students based on their clique.

The main in-game currency was coins, which were used to purchase hangouts and land plots, as well as some types of classmates. Rings were the premium currency and could be used to purchase certain types of classmates and speed up timers. Both currencies were obtained by completing quests; they could also be purchased with real money. Hangouts also produced coins, the amount of which varied based on clique and number of students in the hangout.

At the beginning of the game, the player was able to choose their gender, appearance, and clique, though they were only able to choose from the three basic cliques: Nerd, Prep, or Jock. As the player progressed through the game, they unlocked combined cliques, which could be obtained by purchasing students from Admissions or "Partying" to get the type of student they wanted. With the exception of the main characters created by the game, all characters' facial features, hairstyles, and outfits were customizable.

== Reception ==
Google Play and the iOS App Store both gave it a 4.5 out of 5.

== Termination of Support ==
On June 4, 2018, Pixelberry Studios announced on the High School Story Facebook page that it would release the "finale" quest for High School Story on June 18, and that it would release a "final update in the following weeks."

On July 15, 2022, Pixelberry Studios announced via its blog that High School Story and its companion game Hollywood U will have its servers shut down permanently on August 10, 2022. Labelled as "The Final Sunset," both games were removed from the App Store and Google Play Store.

== Legacy ==
In 2013, Pixelberry raised $300,000 for The Cybersmile Foundation in an anti-bullying campaign, where Pixelberry matched user's in-app purchases. Pixelberry also enabled teens to contact Cybersmile about bullying concerns; during the campaign, Cybersmile reported that more than 100 teens contacted them every week because of the game.

The following summer, Pixelberry partnered with the National Eating Disorders Association (NEDA) to fund resources for players with body image issues. Within the app, NEDA helped set up an eating disorder FAQ and could respond to eating disorder support requests.

In December 2014, High School Story had 12 million downloads and $9.7 million in revenue derived from in-app purchases.

== Sequel ==
A set of visual novels set in the High School Story world are included in Pixelberry Studios' app Choices: Stories You Play. Split into three books composed of fifteen chapters each, the story focuses on a new character created by the player who transfers to Berry High. Original High School Story characters Julian, Payton, Mia, Autumn, Koh, Sakura, Ezra, Nishan, Kara, Max, and Wes appear in these books, as does Hearst High as the rival school. In addition, five new characters are introduced as “Love Interests” for the main character: Emma, Caleb, Michael, Maria, and Aiden.

The series also spawned a sequel trilogy, High School Story: Class Act, that follows a new set of characters, with old and original characters making very rare appearances. Class Act ended at the beginning of 2020, bringing the entire High School Story saga to a close.

== See also ==
- Surviving High School (mobile game)
