= Laurence Pay =

Anglican priest

Laurence Pay was an English priest in the 17th century.

Pay was educated at Christ Church, Oxford. He held livings at West Stoke, Pulborough and Birdham. He was archdeacon of Chichester from 1634 until 1939.
