= Fiona Windsor =

Julie Fiona Windsor (called Fiona; born 2 September 1959) is a British Anglican priest. She served as the Archdeacon of Horsham in the Diocese of Chichester from 2014 until her retirement in 2020.

Windsor was educated at Ridley Hall, Cambridge and ordained in 2001. After a curacy in Chertsey she was Team Vicar at Papworth then the Bishop's Advisor on Women's Ministry in the Diocese of Ely from 2012 until 2014. On 21 September 2014, she was appointed as Archdeacon of Horsham in the Diocese of Chichester.
