= Keith Hobbs (priest) =

Keith Hobbs (1925–18 June 2001) was an Anglican priest and Archdeacon of Chichester

Hobbs was born in Ashby-de-la-Zouch, Leicestershire. He served in the Royal Navy as a scientist during World War II, after which he attended Exeter College, Oxford, taking a degree in mathematics in 1946. After another period of service in the navy, he went to Wells Theological College to train for ordination in the Church of England.

Hobbs was ordained in 1958 and was an assistant curate of Clewer, Berkshire and, in 1960, moved to St Anne’s Soho. He and his wife, Mary, were both appointed lecturers at the Borough Teacher Training College, where they remained until both were made redundant in 1978. During that time he also assisted at St Stephen’s Church in Gloucester Road, Kensington, where T. S. Eliot worshipped. He then joined the staff of the Bishop of Chichester as a domestic chaplain and, in 1981, was appointed the Archdeacon of Chichester, serving in the post for 10 years until his retirement.

Hobbs married the historian Mary Ruderman in Wolverhampton in 1950. They had three children, one of whom died young.
