= Choices: Stories You Play =

2016 video game

- Early app icon for Choices
- Developer: Pixelberry Studios
- Platforms: iOS, Android
- Release: August 2016
- Genres: Interactive fiction, visual novel

Choices: Stories You Play is a 2016 interactive fiction game developed by Pixelberry Studios. In the game, players choose from multiple stories that are offered and read through visual novel-styled stories. This involves choosing from menus on what actions for their character to perform. The game features microtransactions for options for more premium choices in the game. While initially featuring romance, fantasy, and mystery, the game later expanded into other genres in 2018.

Choices: Stories You Play was part of a wave of similar library of stories games made for mobile devices in the second half of the 2010s, such as Episode: Choose Your Story (2014), and Crazy Maple Studio's Chapters: Interactive (2017). By 2018, Pocket Gamer reported that the game had consistently maintained a top 30 grossing position on the American Apple App Store since its launch. By 2018, Tumblr released their annual "Year in Review" lists for video games which charted 2018's most popular games on their platform, which is based on likes, posts and reposts. Choices: Stories You Play was the second on their list. PocketGamer described Choices: Stories You Play as "a huge hit in the interactive storytelling genre" in 2024, saying that it generated $544 million to date with over 100 million downloads. Overview of Choices in Pocketgamer and New Media & Society critiqued the microtransactions as a form of forcing players into paying for more enticing scenes or other elements that enhance gameplay.

== Gameplay ==
Gameplay in Choices: Stories You Play from "Kaitlyn: The Perfect Date". Menu options such as this allow the player to control the narrative of the story.

In the games, players read through visual novel-styled stories, then choose what they wish their character to do next. Most of the narratives are romance stories available in apps that act as libraries, in which when a player finishes one game, they can return to the app to find a host of others. Most of the books in Choices have some sort of character customization, while others have you play as pre-established protagonists and characters. Others are mix of both where you play as your own original character, but also with defined family members.

In the game, players are given options to spend diamonds, which are bought through microtransactions, which are small payments for virtual currency in the game. In Choices, these can be used in specific moments in the stories that lead players access premium choices. For example, in a fantasy story some options are locked behind choices that cost diamonds: the player can pick up a regular short sword which is free or a more powerful double-ended blade which cost players diamonds. These options can lead to special scenes, such as longer interactions with non-player characters. The game also features keys which unlock further exploration of the games stories. These refill within two real life hours with the ability to have two in total on hand.

== Development ==
Choices: Stories You Play was developed by Pixelberry Studios. Pixelberry was founded in 2012 and based out of Mountain View, California. Its CEO was Olivier Miao who co-founded with two other former Electronic Arts (EA) game developers, Keith Emnett and Wilson She. Prior to Choices: Stories You Play, the company had previously developed the mobile games High School Story (2013) and Hollywood U (2014). Miao said that an earlier game he worked on, Centerscore's Surviving High School (2005) was originally envisioned as a role-playing game but found that a school-based setting was better suited for a focus on narrative than battles, it led to Pixelberry focusing on story-oriented games.

Unlike their two previous titles, Choices featured multiple stories to choose from, each receiving a new chapter being offered at regular intervals. Toiya Kristen Finley, author of Branching Story, Unlocked Dialogue said that the games were part of a wave of visual novels which were all for mobile devices such as Episode: Choose Your Story (2014), and Crazy Maple Studio's Chapters: Interactive (2017). Most of narratives were romance stories available in these apps that act as libraries, in which when a player finishes one game, they can return to the app to find a host of others.

When initially launched, Choices had only three episodic books that were in romance, fantasy, and mystery genres. By 2018, the game expanded its range from high school-set romance to include science fiction, horror, and historical fiction. Miao said that the game was initially targeted at female-audience, and added new genres to the series initially to expand to a male audience as well. Choices: Stories You Play is monetized by having each chapter having starting with a 30-second video ad as well as having two in-app currencies purchases of keys and diamond which are bought as microtransactions.

== Release ==
Choices launched in August 2016 with three episodic books available. It is a free-to-play app, which means it allows players to experience much of a game's content without having to pay for it. Within the next two years, their library has expanded to include over 20 different series of books with most having multiple books per series. Pocket Gamer reported that the game had consistently maintained a top 30 grossing position on the American Apple App Store since August 2016. By 2018, it was available on the Apple's App Store and the Google Play store.

Along with Episode, Choices, and What's Your Story? (2018), the Mobile research firm Apptopia said the biggest demographic for the titles were teenagers in 2018, with almost 45% of players aged between 10 and 15, 35% aged 16-21, which totaled for 80% of their audience. who account for 78 per cent of the audience. Female players accounted for most of the audience for the three games, who accounted for 78% of the audience. Tumblr released their annual "Year in Review" lists for video games which charted 2018's most popular games on their platform, which is based on likes, posts and reposts. Their list separates mobile games from console games. Out of 2018's top five biggest mobile games, Choices: Stories You Play was the second on their list. The popularity of the game has driven players create fan accounts across other social media sites like Instagram and Twitter. Writing for Wired, Somdyuti Datta Ray said that popular formats of tribute for the game included fan art and fan fiction.

Pixelberry was acquired by Nexon in 2017. Miao said that he opted to sell the company to Nexon as he trusted their staff, they had many long-running games such as MapleStory (2003) and Dungeon & Fighter (2005) which has been operating for over 10 years and that it was a global company which would expand the market on the game. In March 2022 alone, Choices made one-million US Dollars in revenue worldwide. By 2023, Business Wire reported that Nexon had their revenue from North America and Europe decreased by 5% year over year due to decreases in sales of titles like Choices and other mobile games. Pixelberry was then acquired by developer Series Entertainment in 2024. New chapters in Choices were said to be in development involvement using AI technology. Aaron Astle of PocketGamer overall described Choices as "a huge hit in the interactive storytelling genre" in 2024, saying that it generated $544 million to date with over 100 million downloads. Pixelberry had since gone through two rounds of job layoffs with the first in January 2024 and the next in early 2026.

== Reception ==
Matt Suckley of PocketGamer.biz discussed the in-app purchases of to progress the story, saying that "the very inclusion of these currencies hurts the integrity of the decision-based gameplay, railroading non-paying players into transparently worse choices than those willing to invest." while adding that "short of simply putting stories behind a paywall it's hard to see the format working any other way."

Ray said that the game has drawn criticism for its lack of diversity in its stories regarding racial, gender and sexuality. On June 15, 2020, Pixelberry issued a statement in light of the Black Lives Matter protests that listed actionable steps to increasing diverse book covers, stories on people of color, diverse love interests, and a diverse writer's room. Shortly before the statement, the company put the book "Open Heart: Book 2" on hiatus. In 2020, "My Two First Loves" received a chapter that depicted police brutality with option to skip the scene.

Academic Do Own Kim found Choices: Stories You Play and Episode: Choose Your Story's pay-to-play model of gameplay saying that it "guided predominantly toward profit goals rather than play experience" and "tends to necessitate purchase not simply for extras, but to win—that is, "pay-to-win"—or to progress—that is." She said that the most "rightest" choices, which led to either extra clothing options or scenes that enriched play, were paywalled and required monetary investment or time investment with the key gameplay.

Kim found that both Choices and Episode were both of interactive fiction game clones of each other as they both employed similar generic choice-based structure, free-to-play models, and "conventionally feminine "casual" theme of romance." She found the promise of freedom in these games as illusionary, as only choosing options deemed socially appropriate lead to richer positive sequences or add points to relevant score meters.

== See also ==
- 2016 in video games
- History of mobile games
