= Edward Elwes =

The Ven Edward Leighton Elwes, MA was an eminent Anglican priest in the first third of the 20th century.

He was born on 8 October and educated at Eton and University College, Oxford. He was ordained in 1873 and was Curate of Ashington, Somerset and then Norton St Philip. He was then Chaplain and Vice Principal of Wells Theological College. After a further curacy at Dinder he became Vicar of Over Stowey. He was Rector of Woolbeding from 1895 until 1923 and Rural Dean of the surrounding area from 1896. He was Archdeacon of Chichester from 1903 to 1914 and Chancellor of Chichester Cathedral from then until his death on 30 May 1930.

His second daughter, born in 1895, was the singer Joan Elwes.
