= Bishop of Richborough =

British bishop

The Bishop of Richborough is a suffragan bishop and provincial episcopal visitor for the whole of the Province of Canterbury in the Church of England. Since 2025, Luke Irvine-Capel has served as Bishop of Richborough.

== History ==
The see was erected under the Suffragans Nomination Act 1888 by Order in Council dated 8 February 1994 and licensed by the Archbishop of Canterbury as a "flying bishop" to provide episcopal oversight for parishes throughout the province which cannot in good conscience accept the sacramental ministry of bishops who have participated in the ordination of women. The title takes its name from Richborough, a settlement north of Sandwich in Kent. In the southern province, the bishops of Ebbsfleet and of Richborough each minister in 13 of the 40 dioceses. The Bishop of Richborough serves the eastern half (Canterbury, Chelmsford, Chichester, Ely, Guildford, St Edmundsbury & Ipswich, Leicester, Lincoln, Norwich, Peterborough, Portsmouth, St Albans and Winchester). Prior to the creation of the see in 1995, the Bishop of Ebbsfleet served the entire area of the Province of Canterbury with the exceptions of the dioceses of London, Rochester and Southwark which came under the oversight of the Bishop of Fulham.

On 31 December 2010, Keith Newton resigned as the Bishop of Richborough and soon afterwards was received into the Roman Catholic Church. On 5 May 2011, Norman Banks was announced as the bishop-designate for the position. He was subsequently consecrated bishop on 16 June 2011.

On 10 December 2024, following the retirement of Norman Banks, Luke Irvine-Capel was announced as the bishop-designate after his appointment was approved by the King. Irvine-Capel is to be based in the Diocese of Portsmouth.

== List of bishops ==
Bishops of Richborough
From	Until	Incumbent	Notes
20 July 1995	2001	Edwin Barnes SSC	Became a Roman Catholic on 21 January 2011. Died February 2019
7 March 2002	31 December 2010	Keith Newton SSC	Resigned to become a Roman Catholic
16 June 2011	31 March 2024	Norman Banks SSC	Previously Vicar of Walsingham, Houghton and Barsham in the Diocese of Norwich; retired 31 March 2024.
2025	present	Luke Irvine-Capel SSC	Previously Archdeacon of Chichester; consecrated 27 February 2025; to be based in the Diocese of Portsmouth.

== See also ==
- Bishop of Beverley
- Bishop of Ebbsfleet
- Bishop of Fulham
- List of Anglo-Catholic churches in England
