= William Filby (Anglican priest) =

William Charles Leonard Filby (21 January 1933 – 31 December 2009) was an Anglican priest who was Archdeacon of Horsham from 1983 to 2002.

== Birth and education ==
Filby was born on 21 January 1933, and educated at Ashford County Grammar School. He went on to study at Oak Hill Theological College in north London, and as part of his ordination training he completed a degree through London University, graduating Bachelor of Arts in 1958.

== Church career ==
He was ordained deacon in 1959 and priest in 1960, and was a curate at All Souls', Eastbourne, and Holy Trinity, Knaphill. He held three successive incumbencies at Holy Trinity, Richmond-upon-Thames, Bishop Hannington Memorial Church, Hove, and Broadwater, West Sussex. He became Rural Dean of Worthing in 1980. He was Archdeacon of Horsham from 1983 until his retirement in 2002.

== Private life ==
In 1958 he married Marion Erica Hutchison. They had four sons, Jonathan, Andrew, Christopher, and William; and a daughter, Rebecca.

Filby was a keen cricketer, being a member of the Chichester Diocesan team that won the Church Times Cup on several occasions. He was also a supporter of Sussex County Cricket Club.

He died on 31 December 2009.

== Notes ==
Church of England titles
Preceded by Frederick George Kerr-Dineen	Archdeacon of Horsham; 1983–2002	Succeeded by Roger Matthew Combes
