= Henry Ball (priest) =

The Ven. Henry Ball, D.D. was Archdeacon of Chichester from his collation on 12 April 1596 until his death on 30 March 1603.

He was born in Lichfield and educated at New College, Oxford. He became Rector of Ulcombe from 1583; Precentor of Chichester from 1587; and Canon from 1593.
