= Thomas Hollingbery =

English churchman

Thomas Hollingbery (also Hollingberry, Hollingbury) (died 1792) was an English churchman, Archdeacon of Chichester and a Fellow of the Royal Society.

He was educated at Worcester College, Oxford, where he graduated B.A. in 1755, M.A. in 1758, and D.D. in 1768. He was elected to the Royal Society in 1783.
