= Douglas McKittrick =

Anglican priest (born 1953)

Douglas Henry McKittrick (born 18 February 1953) is a retired Archdeacon of Chichester.

McKittrick was educated at John Marlay School in Newcastle upon Tyne and at St Stephen's House, Oxford. He was ordained in 1977 and after curacies at St Paul's Deptford and St John's Tuebrook held two incumbencies in Liverpool. He was then vicar of St Peter's Brighton until his appointment to the archdeaconry. He was also an active member of the Liberal/Liberal Democrats. He was a Liverpool Councillor for Aigburth from 1986 to 1994.

He retired on 1 July 2018.

On 28 March 2026, he was ordained a priest of the Roman Catholic Church by Bishop Marcus Stock at St Mary's Cathedral, Middlesbrough.

Church of England titles
Preceded by Michael Brotherton	Archdeacon of Chichester; 2002–2018	Succeeded by Luke Irvine-Capel
