= Charles Alcock (priest) =

English cleric

The Venerable Charles Alcock (1754–1803) was an English cleric. He was Archdeacon of Chichester from his installation on 15 May 1802 until his death.

He was the son of the Rev. John Alcock, rector of Bucknell, Oxfordshire, and was educated at Corpus Christi College, Oxford, where he matriculated in 1773. He was awarded the degree of B.C.L. at New College in 1782.

Alcock died at Trotton (where he had been Rector from 1781 until 1782) on 10 September 1803: a prebendary of Chichester Cathedral, he was Chaplain to the Bishop of Chichester until his appointment as Archdeacon.

== Notes ==
Church of England titles
Preceded by John Buckner	Archdeacon of Chichester; 1802–1803	Succeeded by Thomas Taylor
