= St Stephen's House =

British Anglican theological college

Coordinates: 51°44′49″N 1°14′21″W

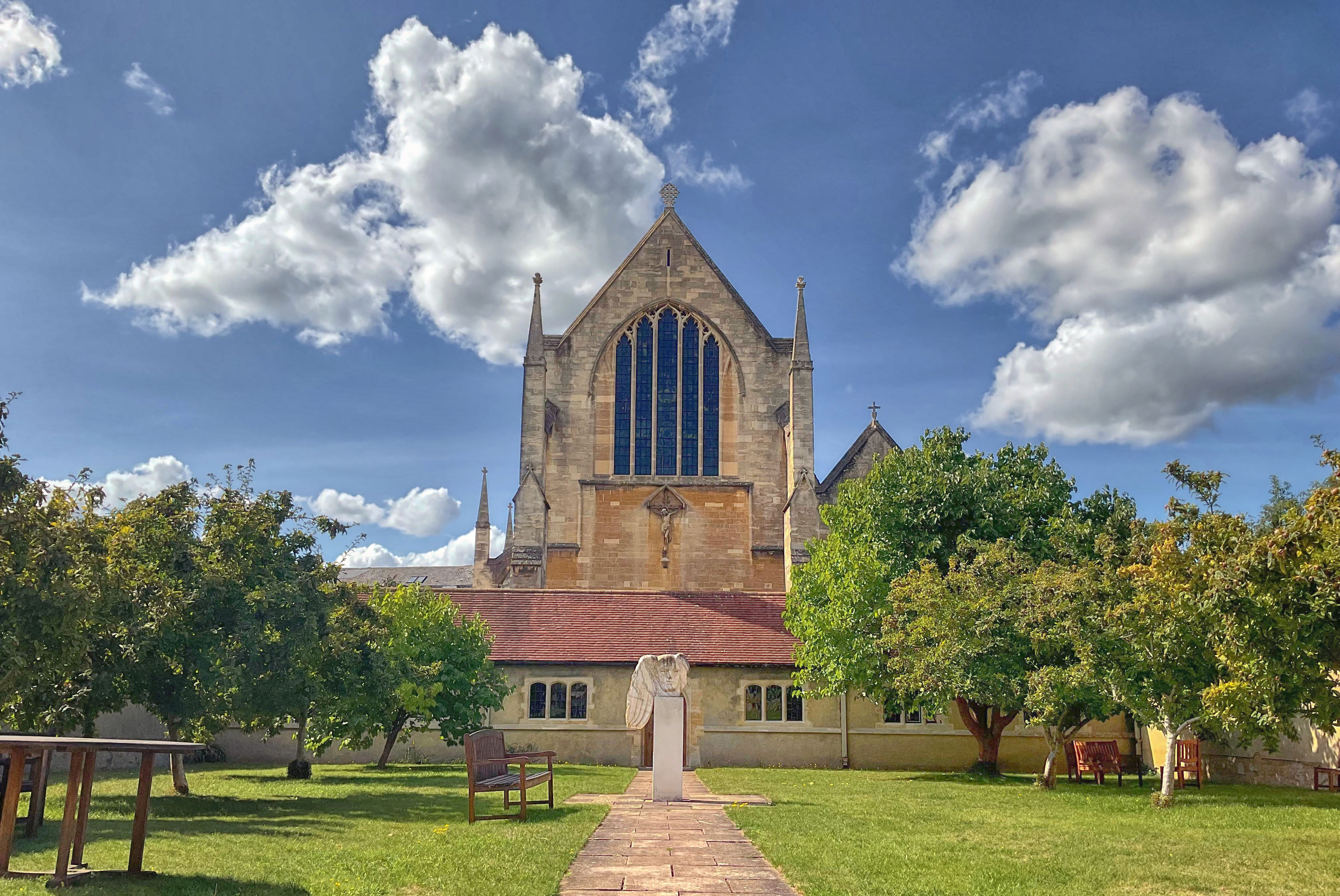
- Cloisters

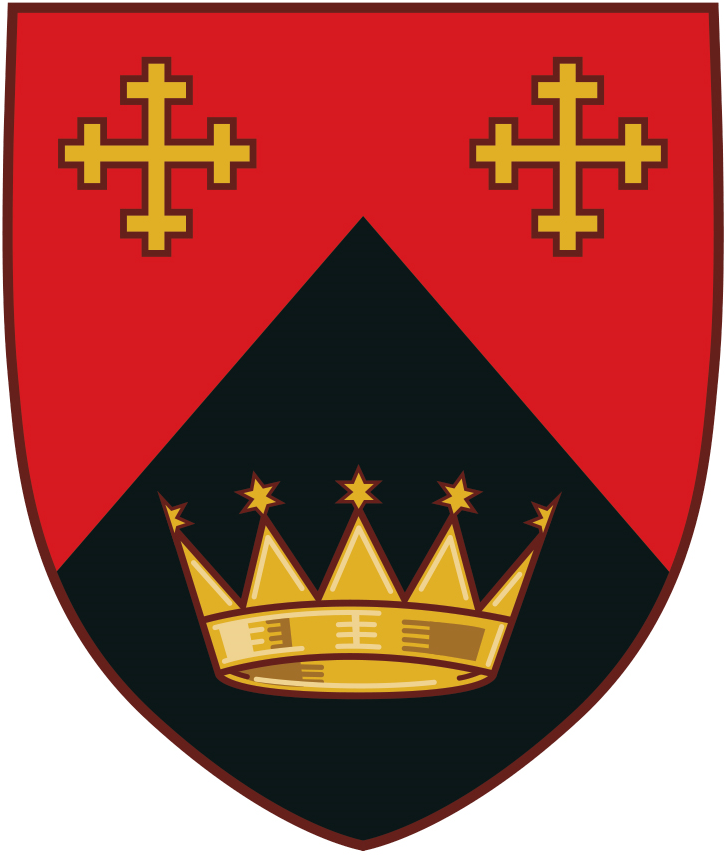
- St Stephen's House College Shield; Arms: Per chevron Gules and Sable in chief two Cross crosslets and in base a Celestial Crown Or.
- Location: 16 Marston Street, Oxford
- Motto: Video caelos apertos (Latin)
- Established: 1876
- Named for: Saint Stephen
- Principal: Harri Williams
- Undergraduates: 5
- Postgraduates: 65
- Website: www.ssho.ac.uk

St Stephen's House is an Anglican theological college with observer status at the University of Oxford. From 2003 to 2023 it was a permanent private hall. It is a registered charity.

The college typically matriculates a small number of undergraduate students (five in the academic year 2022–23), but has graduate students in a number of fields including theology, Byzantine studies, education, and music. Between 2003 and 2023, roughly one quarter of the students were pursuing professional training as classroom teachers, and another quarter professional theological and ministerial training as priests, with the other half following a diverse range of studies and research, many remotely or on a flexible basis.

The hall is rooted in and has a history of Anglo-Catholicism.

== History ==
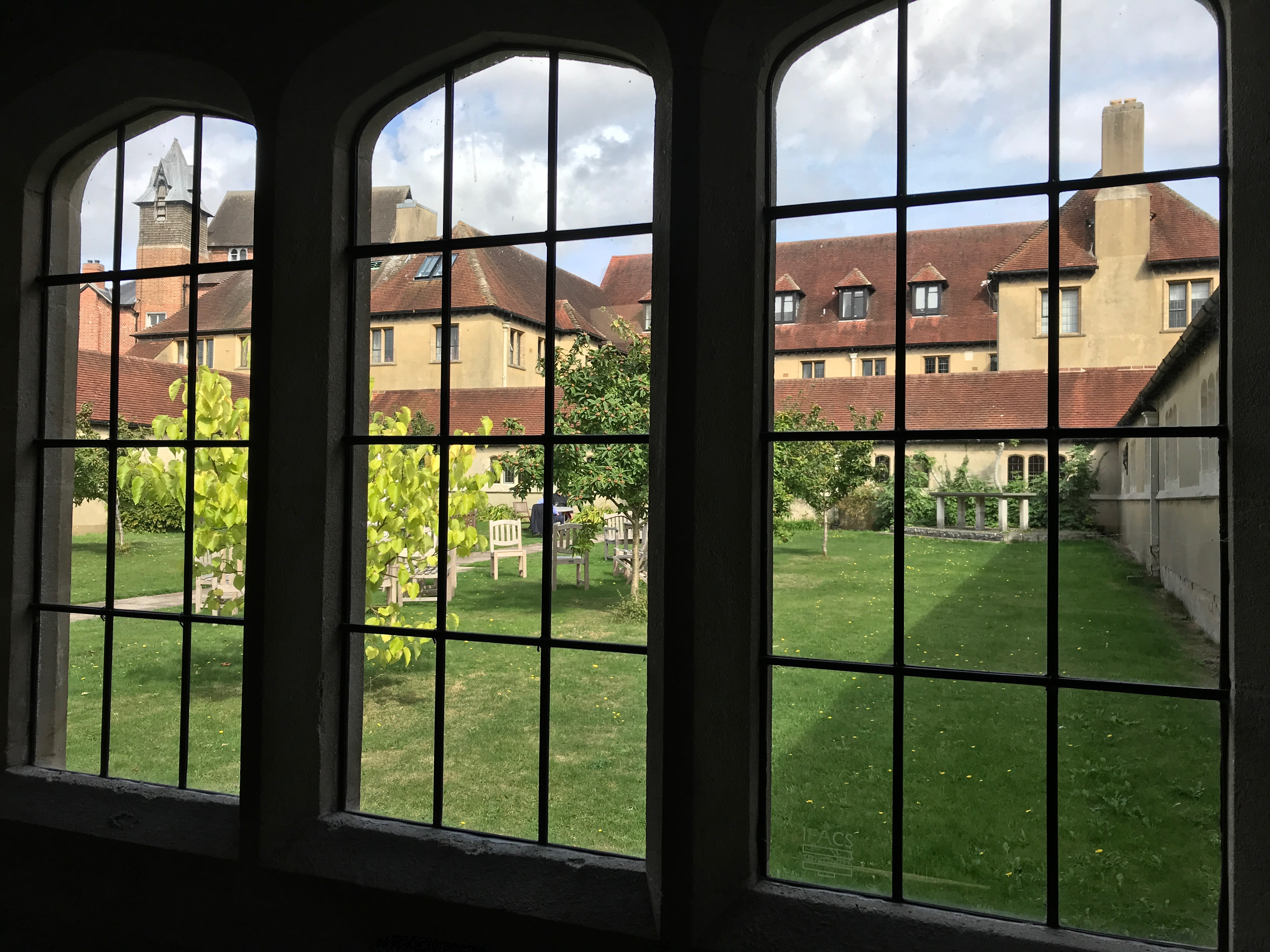
The main quad photographed from inside the west cloister, looking towards the King Building

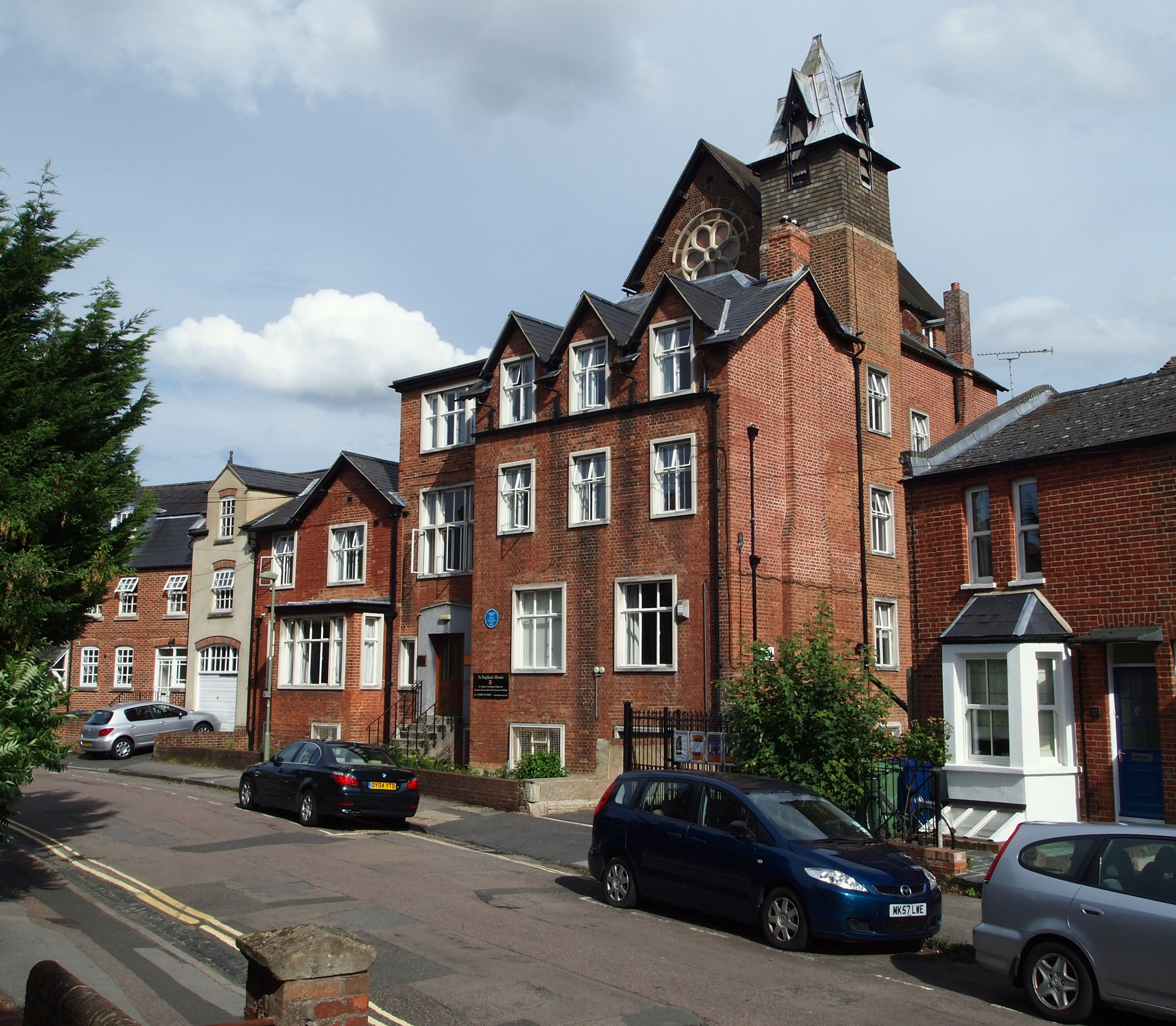
St Stephen's House (Benson building) from Marston Street

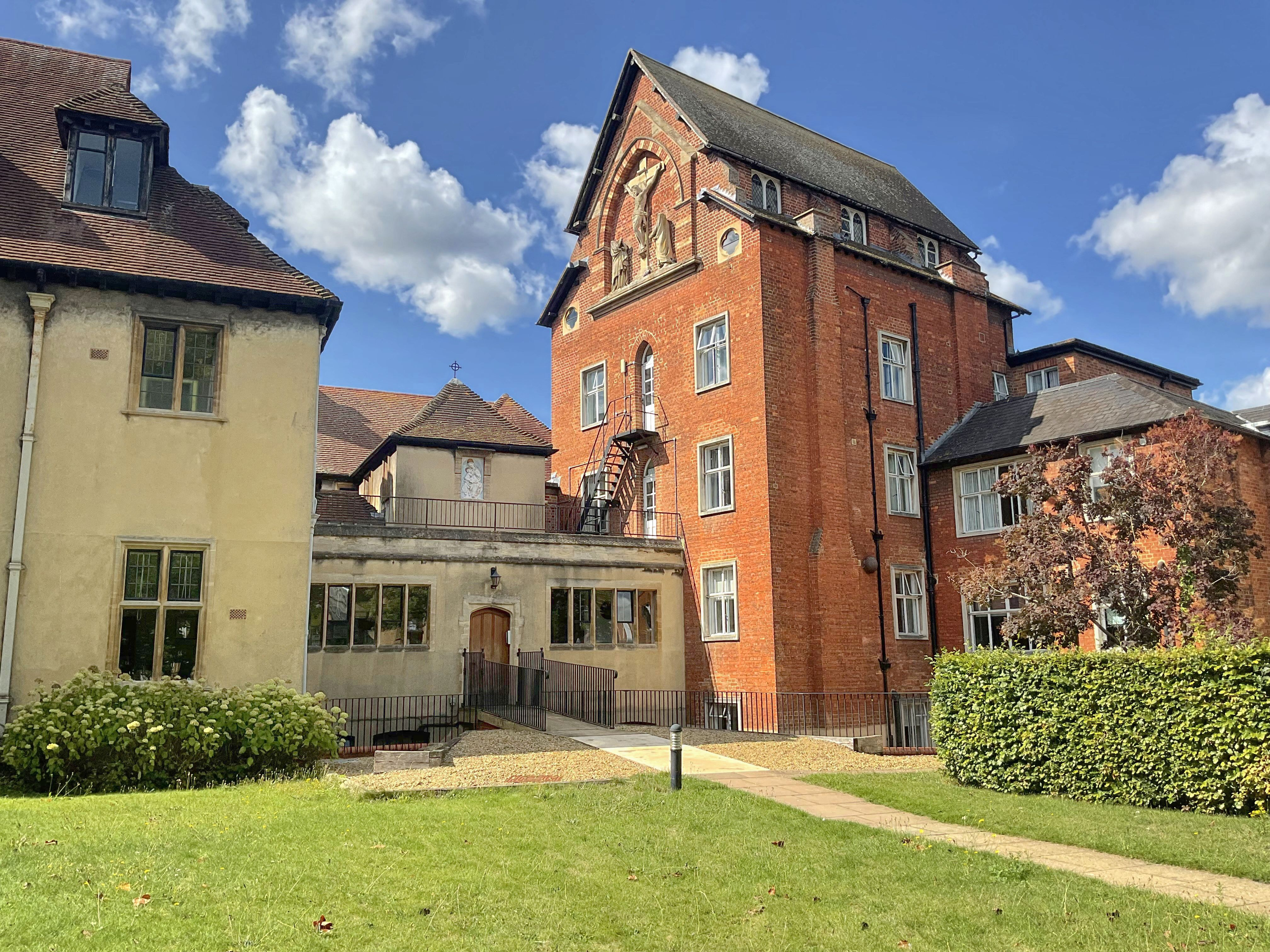
Benson Building

St. Stephen's House was founded in 1876 by members of the Oxford Movement within the Church of England. It was originally located in the very centre of Oxford, on what is today is the site of the New Bodleian Library. Its principal founder was Edward King, Regius Professor of Moral and Pastoral Theology at Oxford and later Bishop of Lincoln.

In 1919 the college relocated to new buildings in Norham Gardens, near the University Parks and Lady Margaret Hall. The college moved again in 1980, having outgrown its earlier buildings, and now occupies the former Anglican monastery of the Society of St. John the Evangelist (Cowley Fathers).

The college was an "associated institution" of the University of Oxford, able to matriculate students in the fields of theology and philosophy, until 2003 when it became a permanent private hall of the university. Since September 2023, it is no longer a permanent private hall, but remains an Anglican theological college. This decision was taken because an increasing proportion of students at the college now study for their qualifications at Durham University via the Church of England Common Awards.

St. Stephen's House still welcomes students to study full-time or part-time degrees of the University of Oxford, though candidates for the University’s B.A. in Theology and Religion and the B.A. in Philosophy and Theology must qualify for Senior Status. Students are still able to matriculate at St. Stephen's House as a student at the University of Oxford, provided "that they are a minister of religion or a genuine candidate for the ministry or exercising lay ministry."

== Institute of Sacred Music ==
In 2023, St. Stephen's House established the Institute of Sacred Music, in partnership with the Royal School of Music. The Institute offers two qualifications, a PgDip and an M.A., both in Worship and Liturgical Studies, accredited by Durham University.

The Royal School of Music provides the course with ten lectures, on various areas relating to liturgy, worship, and sacred music.

== Buildings ==
The college is located in east Oxford, between the Iffley and Cowley roads (to west and east) and James Street and Marston Street (to north and south), with entrances onto all these roads. Although there are some modern buildings, notably the Moberly Close residential accommodation building, most of the college buildings are older and have listed status.

Grade I listing applies to the Church of St John the Evangelist, which is the principal college chapel, and an arts centre, as well as housing some teaching and research facilities in its sacristies and song school. Constructed in 1894–1896 to a design by George Frederick Bodley (1827–1907), it has held grade I listing since 1968. The castellated west tower was added in 1902. The east, west, and north-east windows contain stained glass designed by C. E. Kempe (1837–1907) and made in about 1900. The Church also contains painted Stations of the Cross by the late Pre-Raphaelite artist, Edward Arthur Fellowes Prynne, created for the Cowley Fathers between 1918 and 1921.

Grade II listing was applied to the bulk of the college's other central buildings in 1992. This listing includes the college's main cloister built in 1899 to a design by Bodley, the three lesser cloisters, the Benson Building (residential and teaching accommodation built late nineteenth century, probably designed by Clapton Crabb Rolfe), the King Building (residential, teaching, and administrative accommodation, including the college refectory, the library, and the common room, also designed by Bodley), and the two smaller chapels – the Founders Chapel, and the Ninian Comper designed House Chapel.

St John's Church (and sometimes also the college cloisters) has been since 2012 the performance and display venue for SJE Arts Oxford, a society promoting performing arts and music, and which organises an annual summer choral festival at the college site.

The Song School, once the music department of SSJE, and later the residence of the college's vice principal, has since 2008 housed the Centre for Muslim-Christian Studies, Oxford, an independent body whose senior teaching and research staff are mostly current or former members of the Faculty of Theology and Religion, University of Oxford.

== Controversy ==
=== No-Fault Evictions ===
In February 2026, St Stephen's House issued Section 21 no-fault eviction notices to all private tenants in its Moberly Close annex. This occurred shortly before the Renters' Rights Act 2025 came into effect on 1 May 2026, which abolished no-fault evictions under Section 21 of the Housing Act 1988. The action affected several University of Oxford students with private tenancy agreements. Critics described the move as hypocritical, given that St Stephen's House — a Christian theological college — was celebrating its 150th anniversary in 2026 while placing tenants at risk of homelessness.

== Arms ==
In 2020, St Stephen's House was granted by the College of Arms the current arms Per chevron Gules and Sable in chief two Cross crosslets and in base a Celestial Crown Or and badge A Cross Crosslet Or surmounted by a closed Book Gules leaved Argent and charged with a key wards upwards Or. The badge is used on the college sports kit.

Prior to this, the college used the assumed arms Gules a Celestial Crown between three Bezants two and one Or, on a chief Sable an Apostolic Eagle between two Crosses crosslet Or.

== Principals and fellows ==
=== Principals ===
The Head of House is known as the "principal." To date, every person to have held the office has been an ordained Anglican priest.

- 1876–1877 (res.): Robert Moberly
- 1877–1881: ?
- 1881–1884 (res.): John Octavius Johnston
- 1884–1885 (res.): Berkeley Randolph
- 1885–1888 (res.): Charles Myers
- 1888–1895 (res.): Hugh Currie
- 1895–1903 (res.): Charles Plumb
- 1903–1917 (res.): George Bown
- 1917–1919: ?
- 1919–1936 (res.): Gilbert Mitchell
- 1936–1962 (res.): Arthur Couratin
- 1962–1974 (res.): Derek Allen
- 1974–1982 (res.): David Hope
- 1982–1987 (res.): David Thomas
- 1987–1995 (res.): Edwin Barnes
- 1996–2006 (res.): Jeremy Sheehy
- 2006–2025 (res.): Robin Ward
- 2025–present: Harri Williams

In June 2025 it was announced that the Rev. Harri Williams, Vicar of the Walsingham benefice in Norfolk, had been appointed as the next Principal. He took up the role later in 2025.

=== Honorary research fellows ===
Notable honorary research fellows have included:

- Andrew Linzey, theologian, author and prominent figure in the Christian vegetarianism movement
- James Whitbourn, conductor and composer
- Luke Miller, Archdeacon of London
- Norman Russell, former Archdeacon of Berkshire

== Alumni ==
Many former students, in the tradition of the college, go on to minister in urban priority areas and parishes which suffer poverty and deprivation. The following are amongst the notable former students:

- Jonathan Baker, Bishop of Fulham and the former Bishop of Ebbsfleet
- Norman Banks, Honorary Chaplain to the Queen and Bishop of Richborough
- J. W. B. Barns, Professor of Egyptology at the University of Oxford
- Mark Bonney, Dean of Ely
- Andrew Burnham, former Bishop of Ebbsfleet and former vice principal
- Anthony Caesar, composer
- Alan Chesters, former Bishop of Blackburn
- David Conner, Dean of Windsor (since 1998)
- Stephen Cottrell, Archbishop of York (since 2020)
- Ivor Gordon Davies, Archdeacon of Lewisham from 1972 to 1985.
- Roy Davies, Bishop of Llandaff from 1985 to 1999
- Hovnan Derderian, Primate of the Western Diocese of the Armenian Church of North America
- Mark Elvins, Roman Catholic priest and final Warden of Greyfriars, Oxford
- Walter Hooper, literary advisor to the estate of CS Lewis
- William Howard, 8th Earl of Wicklow, Irish peer
- David Jasper, Professor of Literature and Theology at the University of Glasgow
- Jeffrey John, former Dean of St Albans
- Eric Kemp, former Bishop of Chichester
- Peter Laister, Rector of Saint Clement's Church, Philadelphia, from 1986 to 1993
- Kenneth Leech, priest and Christian socialist
- Trevor Mwamba, former Bishop of Botswana, cameo television actor, and president of the UNIP
- Philip North, Bishop of Burnley
- Mark Oakley, Dean of Southwark
- Gordon Roe, former Bishop of Huntingdon
- John Saward, theologian, fellow of Greyfriars, Oxford
- David Silk, former Bishop of Ballarat in the Anglican Church of Australia
- Glyn Simon, former Archbishop of Wales
- Michael Spence, vice-chancellor of the University of Sydney
- Tim Thornton, former Bishop of Truro, and former Bishop at Lambeth
- Stephen Venner, former Bishop to the Forces and former Bishop for the Falkland Islands
- Martin Warner, Bishop of Chichester
- William Gordon Wheeler, former Roman Catholic Bishop of Leeds
- Colin Williams, General Secretary of the Conference of European Churches
- A. N. Wilson, writer and newspaper columnist

== See also ==
- St John the Evangelist Church, Oxford
