= Keith Newton =

Keith Newton may refer to:

- Keith Newton (prelate) (born 1952), English prelate of the Roman Catholic Church
- Keith Newton (footballer) (1941–1998), English international footballer
