= John Morrill (historian) =

Historian of early-modern Britain

The Reverend John Morrill FBA FRHistS
- Born: John Stephen Morrill; 12 June 1946 (age 80)
- Occupations: Historian, Academic, Clergyman
- Children: 4

Academic background
- Education: Trinity College, Oxford
- Thesis: The government of Cheshire during the civil wars and Interregnum (1971)

Academic work
- Discipline: Historian
- Sub-discipline: Early modern history; Early modern Britain; English Civil War; Oliver Cromwell; political history; cultural history
- Institutions: Trinity College, Oxford; St Catherine's College, Oxford; University of Stirling; Faculty of History, University of Cambridge; Selwyn College, Cambridge; St John's Seminary, Wonersh
- Main interests: British History, Irish History, Catholic Theology
- Website: https://www.trinity.ox.ac.uk/people/john-morrill

John Stephen Morrill FBA FRHistS (born 12 June 1946) is a British Roman Catholic Priest, historian and academic who specialises in the political, religious, social, and cultural history of early-modern Britain from 1500 to 1750, especially the English Civil War. He is best known for his scholarship on early modern politics and his unique county studies approach which he developed at Cambridge. Morrill was educated at Trinity College, Oxford, and became a fellow of Selwyn College, Cambridge, in 1975.

== Early life and education ==
Morrill was born on 12 June 1946 to William Henry Morrill and Marjorie (née Ashton). He was educated at Altrincham County Grammar, an all-boys grammar school in Cheshire. In 1964, he matriculated into Trinity College, Oxford, to study history. He graduated with a Bachelor of Arts (BA) degree in 1967, and a Doctor of Philosophy (DPhil) degree in 1971.

== Academic career ==
Morrill began his academic career with a number of short term appointments. For the 1970/71 academic year, he was Keasbey Lecturer in history at Trinity College, Oxford. He held a junior research fellowship at Trinity from 1971 to 1974. He was also a college lecturer in history at St Catherine's College, Oxford, for the 1973/74 academic year. Then, from 1974 to 1975, he was a lecturer in modern history at the University of Stirling.

Although his Stirling post had been a permanent appointment, Morrill moved to the University of Cambridge in 1975, having been appointed an assistant lecturer (later lecturer) in its Faculty of History. He was promoted to reader in early modern history in 1992, and professor of British and Irish history in 1998. He was deputy director of the Centre for Research in the Arts, Social Sciences and Humanities (CRASSH) from 2001 to 2004. He has also been a fellow of Selwyn College, Cambridge, since 1975 and active in the college's administration: he was director of studies in history from 1975 to 1992, a tutor from 1979 to 1992, admissions tutor from 1982 to 1987, the senior tutor from 1987 to 1992, and served as vice-master from 1992 to 2001. Having retired in 2015 from full-time academia, he was appointed professor emeritus by the University of Cambridge and emeritus fellow of Selwyn College.

He was elected a Fellow of the British Academy (FBA) in 1995, and served as Vice-President in 2001–09. He is also an honorary Member of the Royal Irish Academy (HonMRIA) and the Academy of Finland. He holds honorary degrees from several universities, and is an Honorary Fellow of Trinity College, Oxford, and Trinity College, Dublin. He was Chair of the Research Committee of the AHRB (2002–05), and also served as a Vice-President of Royal Historical Society.

Morrill was President for 10 years of the Cromwell Association, "a body that seeks to promote public knowledge about and interest in Cromwell and his age".

According to the online Bibliography of British and Irish History, he has published (up to July 2016) 116 books, essays and articles but some of his major contributions have been in developing online datasets – as General Editor of the Royal Historical Society Bibliography of British and Irish History and of the British Overseas (1992–99) — now the online Bibliography of British and Irish History, as Chair of the Management Committee of the project that put 8,000 survivor statements from the 1641 'massacres' in Ireland, and as General Editor of an imminent (5 volume and online) edition of all the recorded words of Oliver Cromwell.

On 6 July 2009, Morrill delivered his lecture 'The British Revolution in the English Provinces, 1640-9' as part of The Marc Fitch Lectures.

== Church career ==
In 1996, Morrill was ordained as a permanent deacon in the Roman Catholic Church. He has held several senior positions in the Diocese of East Anglia (e.g. Lourdes Pilgrimage Diocesan Director, Chair of the Commission for Evangelisation and Assistant Director for Diaconal Formation), and previously taught Church History and Pastoral Theology one weekend a month at St John's Seminary, Wonersh. He was ordained as a Catholic priest on 21 September 2024 at the Cathedral of St John the Baptist by Peter Collins, Bishop of East Anglia.

== Personal life ==
In 1968, Morrill married Frances Mead. Together they had four daughters. His wife predeceased him, dying in 2007.

== Works ==
- Revolt of the Provinces: Conservatives and Radicals in the English Civil War, 1630–1650 (Allen & Unwin, 1976); ISBN 0-06-494975-3 (review)
- The Civil War and Interregnum: Sources for Local Historians (with G.E. Aylmer) (Bedford Square Press, 1979) (read online)
- Seventeenth Century Britain, 1603–1714 (Dawson, 1980) (read online)
- Reactions to the English Civil War, 1642–1649 (Palgrave Macmillan, 1982); ISBN 0-312-66443-5 (read online)
- Charles I (with Christopher W. Daniels) (Cambridge University Press, 1988); ISBN 0-521-31728-2 (read online)
- Oliver Cromwell and the English Revolution (Longman, 1990); ISBN 0-582-01675-4 (read online)
- The Impact of the English Civil War (Collins & Brown, 1991); ISBN 1-85585-042-7 (read online)
- The Nature of the English Revolution (Longman, 1993); ISBN 0-582-08941-7 (review)
- The British Problem, ca. 1534–1707: State Formation in the Atlantic Archipelago (with Brendan Bradshaw (Palgrave Macmillan, 1996); ISBN 0-333-59245-X
- The Oxford Illustrated History of Tudor and Stuart Britain (Clarendon Press, 1996); ISBN 0-19-820325-X (review by Anthony Fletcher)
- The Civil Wars: A Military History of England, Scotland, and Ireland 1638–1660 (ed. John Morrill, John Kenyon, and Jane Ohlmeyer) (Oxford University Press. 1988) (read online)
- Revolt in the Provinces: The English People and the Tragedies of War, 1634–1648 (Longman, 1999) (read online)
- Stuart Britain: A Very Short Introduction (Oxford University Press Paperbacks, 2000); ISBN 0-19-285400-3 (read online)
- Uneasy Lies the Head That Wears a Crown: Dynastic Crises in Tudor and Stewart Britain, 1504–1746 (University of Reading, 2005) read online
- Oliver Cromwell (Oxford University Press, VIP series, 2007) read online
- Firmly I Believe and Truly: The Spiritual Tradition of Catholic England, 1483–1999 (with John Saward and Michael Tomko) (Oxford University Press, 2011) read online
- The Nature of the English Revolution Revisited: Essays in Honour of John Morrill (eds. Stephen Taylor and Grant Tapsell) (Boydell, 2013)
