= Keith Newton (prelate) =

English Roman Catholic monsignor (born 1952)

The Right Reverend Monsignor Keith Newton PA
- Ordinary Emeritus of the Personal Ordinariate of Our Lady of Walsingham
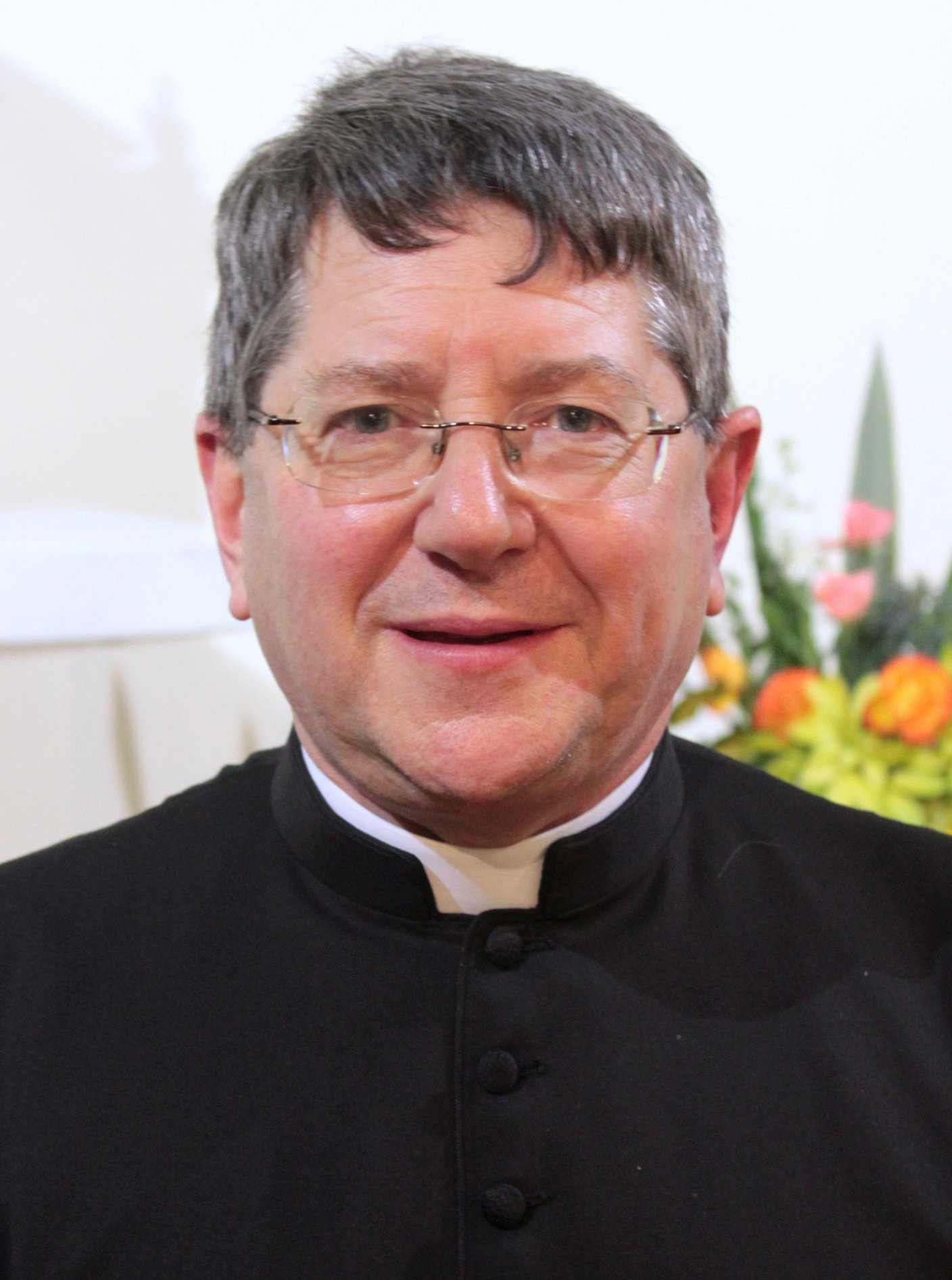
- Monsignor Keith Newton
- Church: Catholic Church
- Province: Immediately subject to the Holy See
- See: Personal Ordinariate of Our Lady of Walsingham
- Appointed: 15 January 2011
- Term ended: 29 April 2024
- Predecessor: New post
- Successor: David Waller
- Previous posts: Bishop of Richborough (Church of England, 2002–2010)

Orders
- Ordination: 1975 (Anglican deacon); 1976 (Anglican priest); 13 January 2011 (Catholic deacon) by Alan Hopes; 15 January 2011 (Catholic priest) by Vincent Nichols
- Consecration: 2002 (Anglican bishop) by George Carey
- Rank: Protonotary Apostolic

Personal details
- Born: 10 April 1952 (age 74) Liverpool, United Kingdom
- Denomination: Roman Catholic (formerly Anglican)
- Spouse: Gill Donnison (m. 1973)
- Children: 3
- Education: King's College London (BD); Christchurch College, Canterbury (PGCE)
- Motto: Non habemus hic manentem civitatem ("Here we have no lasting city", Hebrews 13:14)
- Coat of arms: Keith Newton's coat of arms

Ordination history
History
Diaconal ordination
- Ordained by: Alan Hopes
Priestly ordination
- Ordained by: Vincent Nichols

Styles of Keith Newton
- Reference style: His Excellency; The Right Reverend
- Spoken style: Your Excellency
- Religious style: Monsignor

Keith Newton (born 10 April 1952) is an English priest and prelate of the Catholic Church. Newton was named as the first ordinary of the Personal Ordinariate of Our Lady of Walsingham from 15 January 2011 to 29 April 2024, however he is not a Catholic bishop. Prior to his reception into the Catholic Church in 2011, Newton had been a priest and bishop of the Church of England; his last Anglican office was as Bishop of Richborough in the Province of Canterbury from 2002 to 31 December 2010.

== Anglican ministry ==
Newton studied divinity at King's College London and went on to earn a Postgraduate Certificate in Education at Christ Church College Canterbury before completing his theological studies as an Anglican ordinand at St Augustine's College, Canterbury. He was ordained in the Church of England as a deacon in 1975 and as a priest in 1976.

Newton held the following positions in the Church of England:

- 1975–1978, Curate of Great Ilford St Mary, Chelmsford
- 1978–1985, Team vicar at St Matthew's Wimbledon in the Wimbledon Team Ministry, Southwark
- 1985–1991, Rector of Blantyre, Malawi, and then Dean of Blantyre Cathedral
- 1991–1993, Priest-in-charge of Holy Nativity Knowle, Bristol
- 1993–2001, Vicar of Holy Nativity Knowle, Bristol
- 1997–2001, Priest-in-charge of All Hallows, Easton

From 1995 to 1998, Newton was Rural Dean of Brislington. From 1998 to 2001 he was area dean of the new deanery of Bristol South.

On 7 March 2002, Newton was consecrated as an Anglican bishop by George Carey, the then Archbishop of Canterbury. Newton was subsequently Bishop of Richborough and a provincial episcopal visitor for the Province of Canterbury. He held this post until 31 December 2010, when he left the Church of England.

== Ordination in the Catholic Church ==
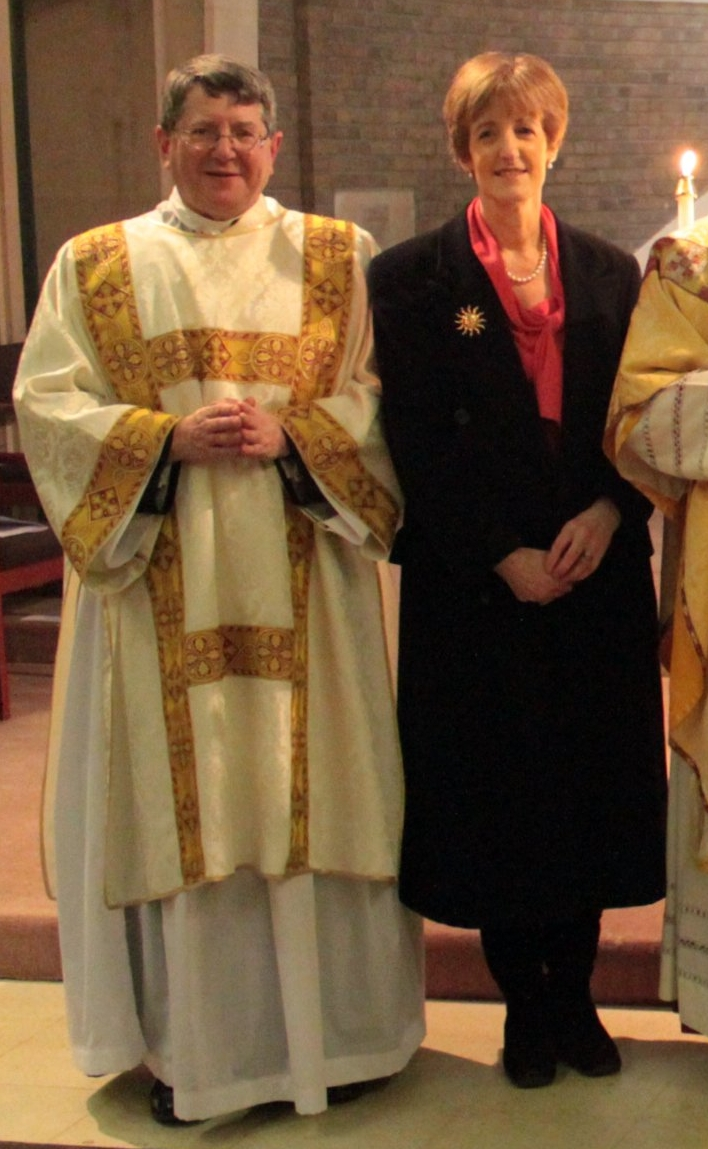
Newton and his wife Gill after his ordination as a Catholic deacon

In 2008, Newton met officials of the Congregation for the Doctrine of the Faith to discuss the possibility of joining the Catholic Church.

On 8 November 2010, Newton announced his intention to leave the Church of England at the end of the year in order to join the proposed personal ordinariates of the Catholic Church for former Anglicans.

Newton was received into the Catholic Church on 1 January 2011, at Westminster Cathedral, with his wife Gill, by Bishop Alan Hopes. Also received at the same ceremony were Andrew Burnham (former Bishop of Ebbsfleet), John Broadhurst (former Bishop of Fulham) and his wife Judith, and three former sisters of the Society of Saint Margaret in Walsingham – Sister Carolyne Joseph, Sister Jane Louise and Sister Wendy Renate. On 13 January 2011, he was ordained by Bishop Hopes to the diaconate with the two other former Church of England bishops, Andrew Burnham and John Broadhurst. Two days later, on 15 January 2011, they were ordained to the priesthood by Vincent Nichols, Archbishop of Westminster, at Westminster Cathedral. On this date, Pope Benedict XVI appointed Newton the first ordinary of the Personal Ordinariate of Our Lady of Walsingham in England and Wales. As a married man, according to its canon law, the Catholic Church did not permit his consecration as a bishop but it was possible for him to be ordained a priest as a former Anglican cleric.

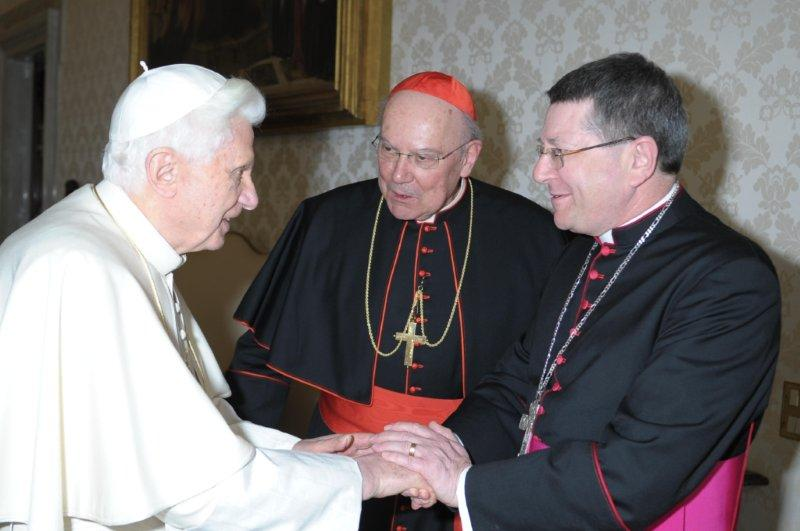
Newton with Pope Benedict XVI in April 2011

On 17 March 2011, it was announced that Pope Benedict XVI had granted Newton the title of protonotary apostolic (the highest ranking non-episcopal honorific title for Catholic clergy and the highest grade of monsignor). Although Newton, as ordinary, does not have an episcopal ministry, he has been granted the use of pontificals (including the mitre, pectoral cross, episcopal ring and crozier etc.) by the Holy See in the same manner as some abbots.

Newton became a cruise chaplain with seafarers' welfare charity Apostleship of the Sea in 2014.

== Personal life ==
Newton is married to Gill, a teacher, with whom he has three adult children – Lucy, Tom and James.

== Styles ==
- Mr Keith Newton (1952–1975)
- The Reverend Keith Newton (1975–1986)
- The Very Reverend Keith Newton (1986–2002)
- The Right Reverend Keith Newton (2002–2010)
- Mr Keith Newton (1–13 January 2011)
- The Reverend Keith Newton (13–15 January 2011)
- The Right Reverend Keith Newton (15 January – 17 March 2011)
- The Right Reverend Monsignor Keith Newton PA (2011–present)

Church of England titles
Preceded by Edwin Barnes	Bishop of Richborough; 2002–2010	Succeeded by Norman Banks
Catholic Church titles
New title	Ordinary of the Personal Ordinariate of Our Lady of Walsingham; 2011–2024	Succeeded by David Waller
