= David Thomas (bishop) =

The Right Reverend David Thomas
- Provincial Assistant Bishop
- Church: Church in Wales
- Province: Wales
- In office: 1996 to 2008
- Successor: No successor appointed
- Other post: Principal of St Stephen's House, Oxford (1982–1987)

Orders
- Ordination: 1967 (deacon); 1968 (priest)
- Consecration: 21 December 1996

Personal details
- Born: 22 July 1942 Bangor, Wales
- Died: 11 May 2017 (aged 74) West Cross, Swansea, Wales
- Denomination: Anglicanism

David Thomas (22 July 1942 – 11 May 2017) was a Welsh Anglican bishop. From 1996 to 2008, he served as the Provincial Assistant Bishop of the Church in Wales. In this role, he ministered to those who could not accept the ordination of women as priests.

== Early life and education ==
Thomas was born on 22 July 1942 in Bangor, Wales. He was educated at Christ College, Brecon, a private school in Brecon. He studied classics at Keble College, Oxford, graduating with a Bachelor of Arts (BA) degree in 1964: as per tradition, his BA was promoted to a Master of Arts (MA Oxon) degree in 1967. In 1964, he entered St Stephen's House, Oxford, an Anglo-Catholic theological college to train for Holy Orders. During this time, he also studied theology at Keble College, graduating with a further BA degree in 1966. After further training, he left theological college in 1967 to be ordained.

== Ordained ministry ==
In May 1967, Thomas was ordained in the Church in Wales as a deacon by his father Jack Thomas, the then Bishop of Swansea and Brecon. In 1968, he was ordained as a priest by David Bartlett, the then Bishop of St Asaph.

In the 1970s and 1980s, Thomas worked at St Stephen's House, Oxford, a Church of England theological college. He was Vice-Principal from 1975 to 1979, and Principal from 1982 to 1987.

In November 1996, Thomas received a letter asking him to become the first Provincial Assistant Bishop (PAB) of the Church in Wales; in that role he would provide episcopal oversight to those priests and parishes that could not accept the ordination of women. Having accepted, he was consecrated a bishop on 21 December 1996 during a service at St Asaph Cathedral. He stepped down as PAB and retired from full-time ministry in 2008.

== Personal life ==
On 1 April 1967, Thomas married Rosemary Christine Calton. Together they had two children: one son and one daughter.

On 11 May 2017, Thomas died suddenly, having just returned from a holiday; he was aged 74. A Requiem Mass was held for him on 5 June 2017 at St Mary's Priory Church, Abergavenny.

Academic offices
Preceded by David Hope	Principal of St Stephen's House, Oxford; 1982–1987	Succeeded by Edwin Barnes
