= Church of the Most Precious Blood, Southwark =

Church of the Most Precious Blood
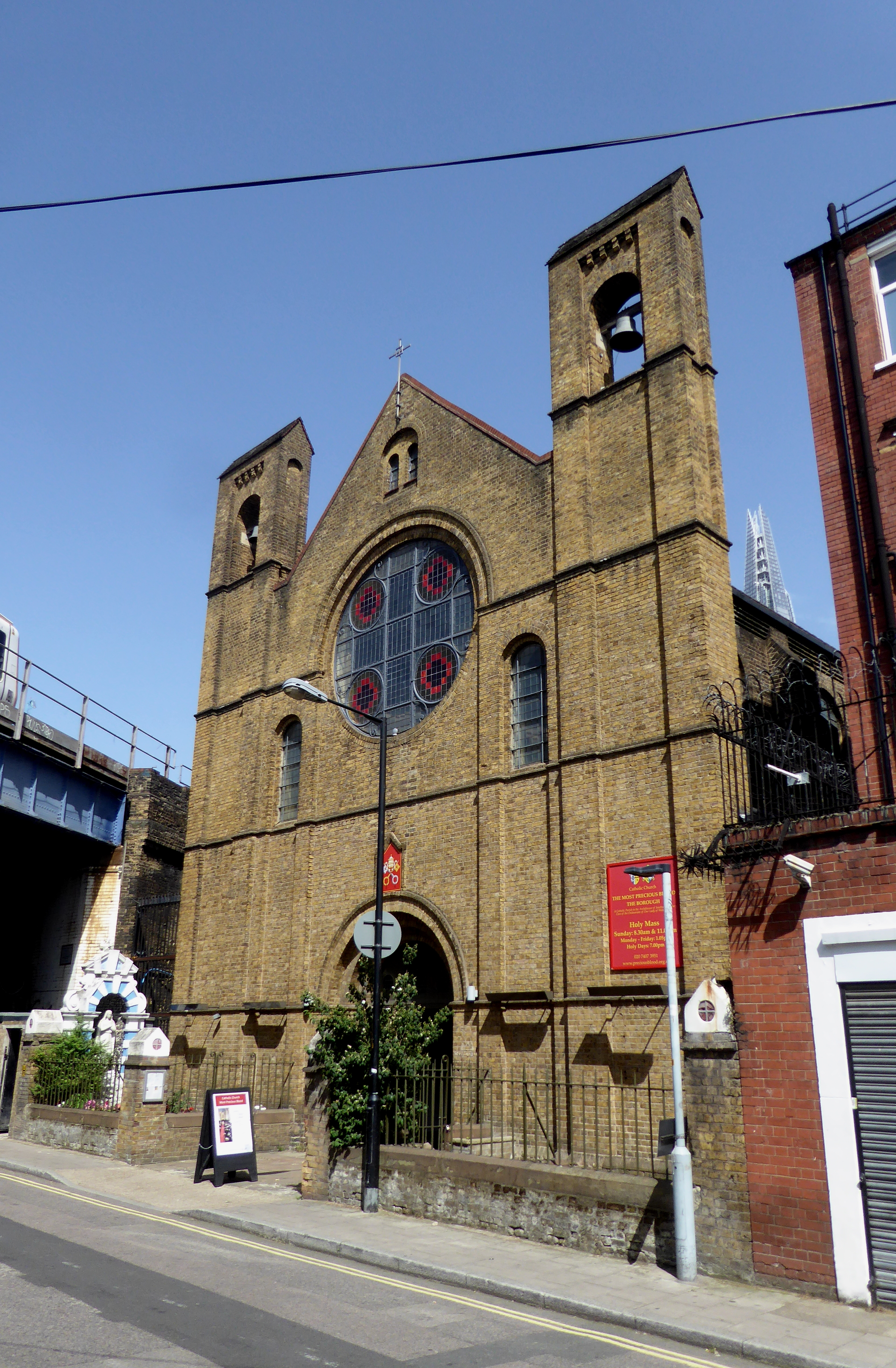
- Front of the church from O'Meara Street

- Location within Greater London Location within the United Kingdom
- 51.50411°N 0.09406°W
- OS grid reference: TQ 32379 80074
- Location: Southwark, London
- Address: O'Meara Street, SE1
- Country: England
- Denomination: Catholic Church
- Website: www.preciousblood.org.uk

History
- Founded: 1891
- Dedication: Most Precious Blood

Architecture
- Functional status: Active
- Heritage designation: Grade II
- Designated: 17 April 2014
- Architect: Frederick Walters
- Construction cost: £7000

Administration
- Division: Personal Ordinariate of Our Lady of Walsingham
- Province: Ecclesiastical province of Southwark
- Archdiocese: Archdiocese of Southwark
- Deanery: Cathedral
- Parish: Borough

Clergy
- Priest: Fr Christopher Pearson OLW

The Church of the Most Precious Blood is a Roman Catholic church in the Archdiocese of Southwark in the Pastoral Care of the Personal Ordinariate of Our Lady of Walsingham, situated on O'Meara Street in Southwark, London, SE1.

The Parish of the Most Precious Blood was established in 1891 by the Bishop of Southwark, John Baptist Butt, upon a bequest of £10,000. The church was designed by the architect Frederick Walters in Neo-Romanesque style. The combined cost of the construction of the church and adjoining presbytery was £7,000, and they were completed in 1892. The Stations of the Cross that adorn the walls of the interior were installed in 1894, and made from terracotta by the Swiss artist Matthias Zens.

The two bells of the church were made in the Whitechapel Bell Foundry and installed in 1956. The shrine outside the church to Our Lady of Lourdes (or Our Lady of All Nations) was dedicated in 1957. It is made from Sicilian marble and stands in a niche lined with flint from Norfolk.

In 2013, the parish joined the Personal Ordinariate of Our Lady of Walsingham.

The church and its adjoining presbytery, forecourt walls and shrine have been listed Grade II on the National Heritage List for England since 2014.

Denis Evinson, in his book Catholic Churches of London, described the interior as "...a joy to enter, warm, welcoming and uncluttered by busy detail".

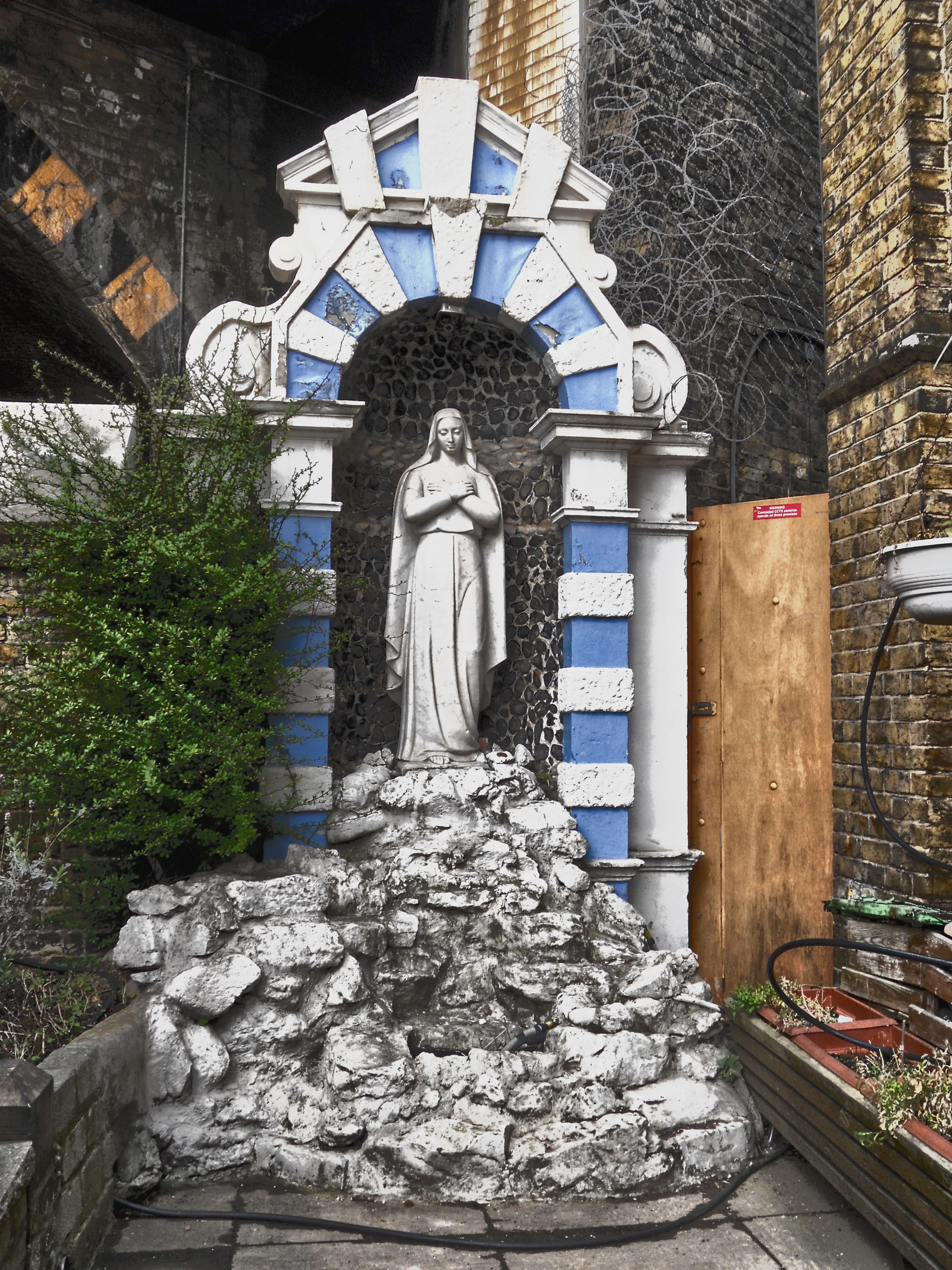
The shrine at the entrance to the church for Our Lady of Lourdes

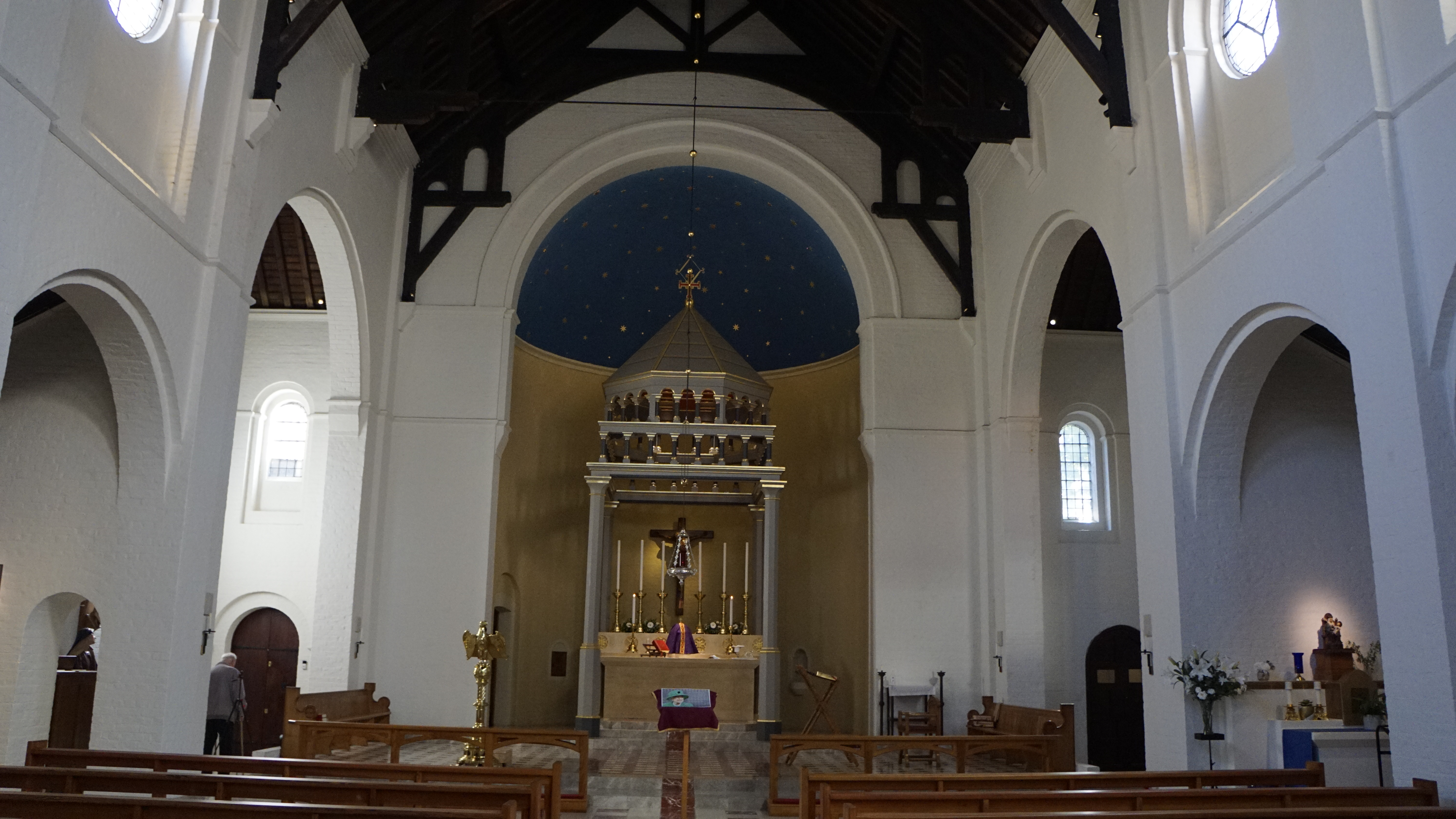
Church Interior
