= Personal Ordinariate of Our Lady of Walsingham =

Catholic ecclesiastical jurisdiction for former Anglicans

The Personal Ordinariate of Our Lady of Walsingham in England and Wales Ordinariatus Personalis Dominae Nostrae Valsinghamensis in Anglia et Cambria
- Coat of arms

Location
- Country: United Kingdom
- Territory: Great Britain
- Ecclesiastical province: Immediately subject to the Holy See

Statistics
- Parishes: 36
- Congregations: 57
- Members: 1,950 (2021)

Information
- Denomination: Catholic Church
- Sui iuris church: Latin Church
- Rite: Anglican Use of the Roman Rite
- Established: 15 January 2011
- Patron: Saint John Henry Newman
- Secular priests: 97

Current leadership
- Pope: Leo XIV
- Ordinary: David Waller
- Episcopal Vicars: Christopher Lindlar; Michael Halsall
- Bishops emeritus: Keith Newton (Ordinary Emeritus)

Website
- ordinariate.org.uk

The Personal Ordinariate of Our Lady of Walsingham in England and Wales is a personal ordinariate in the Latin Church of the Catholic Church immediately exempt, being directly subject to the Holy See. It is within the territory of the Catholic Bishops' Conference of England and Wales, of which its ordinary is a member, and also encompasses Scotland. It was established on 15 January 2011 for groups of former Anglicans in England and Wales in accordance with Anglicanorum coetibus, an apostolic constitution written by Pope Benedict XVI, which was supplemented with the Complementary Norms of Pope Francis in 2013.

The personal ordinariate is set up in such a way that "corporate reunion" of former Anglicans with the Catholic Church is possible while also preserving elements of a "distinctive Anglican patrimony". The liturgy used is the Anglican Use, an adaptation of the Roman Rite with Anglican elements. Each ordinariate has its own liturgical calendar. The ordinariate was placed under the title of Our Lady of Walsingham and under the patronage of Saint John Henry Newman, a former Anglican himself.

== History ==
=== Background ===
The apostolic constitution which allows for the institution of personal ordinariates for Anglicans who join the Roman Catholic Church was released on 9 November 2009, after being announced on 20 October 2009 by Cardinal William Levada at a press conference in Rome.

=== Anglican responses ===
The Bishop of Lincoln, John Saxbee, said that "I can't judge the motives behind it [the offer], but the way it was done doesn't sit easily with all of the talk about working towards better relations" and that "Fence mending will need to be done to set conversations back on track."

Roman Catholic clergy who were present at an ecumenical service at Westminster Cathedral for the Week of Prayer for Christian Unity were reported as being "dismayed" by the sermon by Canon Giles Fraser, then chancellor of St Paul's Cathedral, which included comments that the ordinariate had a "slightly predatory feel" and that "In corporate terms, [it is] a little like a takeover bid in some broader power play of church politics."

In 2011, Bishop Christopher Hill, the chairman of the Church of England's Council for Christian Unity, described the erection of the ordinariate as an "insensitive act".

In 2019, the Archbishop of Canterbury, Justin Welby, responded to Anglican priests defecting to Rome in this way by saying "Who cares?" and that he did not mind people leaving to join other denominations as long as they are "faithful disciples of Christ".

=== Formation ===
In October 2010, the parochial church council of St Peter's Church in Folkestone became the first Church of England parochial group to formally begin the process of joining the Roman Catholic Church.

On 8 November 2010, three serving and two retired bishops of the Church of England announced their intention to join the Roman Catholic Church. The serving bishops were provincial episcopal visitors Bishop Andrew Burnham of Ebbsfleet, Bishop Keith Newton of Richborough and Bishop John Broadhurst of Fulham. The retired bishops were Edwin Barnes, formerly Bishop of Richborough, and David Silk, formerly Anglican Bishop of Ballarat in Australia and an honorary assistant bishop in the Diocese of Exeter. The then Archbishop of Canterbury, Rowan Williams, announced that he had with regret accepted the resignations of Bishops Burnham and Newton. In the following week, the Catholic Bishops' Conference of England and Wales considered the proposed ordinariate and gave assurances of a warm welcome for those who wish to be part of it.

On 1 January 2011, Broadhurst, Burnham and Newton (together with their wives, apart from Burnham whose wife is Jewish), three former Anglican nuns of a convent at Walsingham and former members of 20 different Anglican parishes, were received into the Roman Catholic Church.

The first personal ordinariate, the Personal Ordinariate of Our Lady of Walsingham, within the territory of the Catholic Bishops' Conference of England and Wales, was established on 15 January 2011 with Keith Newton appointed as the first ordinary.

About half of St Peter's Parish, Folkestone (mentioned above), including their priest, were received into the ordinariate on 9 March 2011, along with 600 other Anglicans largely from south-east England, with six groups from the Southwark diocese.

The "ordinariate groups", numbering approximately 900 members, entered the ordinariate at Easter 2011, thereby becoming Roman Catholics. Initially, 61 Anglican priests were expected to be received, but some subsequently withdrew, remaining in the Church of England. John Hunwicke, who joined the ordinariate, had his ordination "deferred" owing to unspecified comments allegedly made by him on his Internet blog site, but was subsequently ordained to the Catholic presbyterate. In 2012, Robert Mercer, a former bishop in both the Anglican Communion and the Traditional Anglican Communion, was received into the ordinariate and ordained on 27 March 2012 by Bishop Alan Hopes at the Cathedral of St John the Evangelist, Portsmouth.

In 2013, the Personal Ordinariate of Our Lady of Walsingham became the first ordinariate to have a married layman on his way to priesthood.

In 2014, Monsignor Keith Newton, the ordinary, admitted that the ordinariate had not grown as much as was hoped. It had not yet aroused broad interest among Anglican clergy, who had not welcomed it. To revive interest among Anglican upholders of traditional Christian doctrine, the ordinariate's members, he suggested, should "communicate our message more fully and with more vigour and enthusiasm".

In 2017, Simon Beveridge and another former Anglican military chaplain (Royal Navy/Commando Royal Marines and the Army) were ordained to the priesthood in Scotland under the Personal Ordinariate of Our Lady of Walsingham. In 2018, eight men were ordained to the priesthood within the Walsingham ordinariate.

In 2021 and 2022 four former bishops of the Church of England (Jonathan Goodall, Michael Nazir-Ali, John Goddard and Peter Foster) were received into the ordinariate. Three of them were later ordained as priests. Gavin Ashenden, former chaplain of Queen Elizabeth II and a former missionary bishop of the Christian Episcopal Church, was also received into the ordinariate.

In 2023 it was announced that Richard Pain, a former bishop of the Church in Wales, would also be received into the ordinariate.

=== Religious ===
In 2010, three nuns from the Society of Saint Margaret (SSM) joined the personal ordinariate. The two former SSM sisters formed the Marian Servants of the Incarnation (MSI) and hold private vows. On 12 December 2012, it was announced that 11 religious sisters from the Community of St Mary the Virgin (CSMV) intended to join the ordinariate.

On 1 January 2013, eleven sisters of the CSMV were received into the Roman Catholic Church at the Oxford Oratory of St Aloysius Gonzaga and, with a former SSM sister from Walsingham who had been one of the first members of the ordinariate, were erected as the Sisters of the Blessed Virgin Mary (SBVM), a new religious institute within the ordinariate following the Rule of St Benedict.

=== Financial difficulties ===
The ordinariate experienced what was described as "a tough first year". Writing in the Roman Catholic magazine The Tablet, Keith Newton said that the group was struggling financially. He expressed disappointment "that so many who said that they were heading in the same direction did not follow" and failed to join the ordinariate as expected. In April 2012, Pope Benedict XVI donated $250,000 to the ordinariate to help support its clergy and work.

== Church buildings ==
Catholic church buildings throughout England, Scotland and Wales are used by the ordinariate alongside the established congregations. The Church of Our Lady of the Assumption and St Gregory in Warwick Street, Soho, London, which belongs to the Roman Catholic Archdiocese of Westminster, was designated for the ordinariate's exclusive use from Lent in 2013. Also in 2013, the Church of the Most Precious Blood in Borough, London was placed in the care of the ordinariate by the Archbishop of Southwark. It was previously a Salvatorian parish. In 2017, the ordinariate established its first ever parish in Torbay, Our Lady of Walsingham and St Cuthbert Mayne Church. The church is a former Methodist chapel. St Agatha's Church in Landport, Portsmouth, was part of the Traditional Anglican Communion before being used by the ordinariate.

The use of Church of England buildings by the ordinariate requires permission from the relevant Anglican bishop; permission has been denied in at least one case.

== Leadership ==
The following individuals have served as head of the personal ordinariate:

| No. | Picture | Name | Position | Date installed | Term ended | Term of office | Reason for term end | Coat-of-arms |
|---|---|---|---|---|---|---|---|---|
| 1 | | Monsignor Keith Newton | Ordinary | 15 January 2011 | 29 April 2024 | 13 years, 105 days | Resignation | |
| 2 | | Bishop David Waller | Bishop | 29 April 2024 | present | 2 years, 178 days | | |

== Liturgy ==
=== Missal ===
In 2015, Divine Worship: The Missal was promulgated as the liturgical book for the celebration of Mass in the three ordinariates. Divine Worship is an adaptation of the Roman Rite with Anglican additions (e.g., some characteristic or popular prayers and rubrics) for use by the personal ordinariates: Our Lady of Walsingham (Britain), Our Lady of the Southern Cross (Australasia/Japan), and Our Lady of the Chair of St Peter (North America). A second printing of the missal, with corrections, was published in 2020. Any Catholic may participate in Mass celebrated according to Divine Worship.

=== Divine Office ===
In 2021, Divine Worship: Daily Office (Commonwealth Edition) was issued for use in the Personal Ordinariate of Our Lady of Walsingham and the Personal Ordinariate of Our Lady of the Southern Cross. The office book was published the Catholic Truth Society and contains Morning and Evening Prayer taken from the tradition of the 1662 Book of Common Prayer. In addition, it provides for the lesser hours of Prime, Terce, Sext, None, and Compline, drawn from the Anglican tradition. The Psalmody is arranged according to the monthly cycle common to the prayerbook tradition.

=== Liturgical calendar ===
The proper liturgical calendar of the ordinariate was approved by the Congregation for Divine Worship and the Discipline of the Sacraments on 15 February 2012. In the main, it is identical with the General Roman Calendar as the National Calendar of the Catholic Bishops' Conference of England and Wales, but it has retained some elements that form part of the Anglican patrimony.

In the Proper of Time:

- In place of "Sundays in Ordinary Time", it uses the expressions "Sundays after the Epiphany", "The Sunday called Septuagesima or the Third Sunday before Lent", "The Sunday called Sexagesima or the Second Sunday before Lent", "The Sunday called Quinquagesima or the Sunday Next before Lent", and "Sundays after Trinity". However, the readings at Mass are identical with those in general use in the Roman Rite.
- Ember Days are observed on the Wednesday, Friday and Saturday after the First Sunday of Lent, Pentecost (Whit-Sunday), Holy Cross Day and the First Sunday of Advent.
- Rogation Days are observed on the three days following the Sixth Sunday of Easter.
- In the week between Pentecost and Trinity Sunday, elements of the former octave are fostered: while the readings of the Ordinary Time weekday are retained, the Mass propers and use of red as the liturgical colour "may sustain the themes of Pentecost".

Regarding the Proper of Saints, the ordinariate observes the proper calendars of England and Wales, as well as the following saints:

Notation:

(EW) - An addition or change for the Ordinariate in both England and Wales.
(eW) - An addition or change for the Ordinariate in Wales which is already in the National Calendar of England.
(Ew) - An addition or change for the Ordinariate in England which is already in the National Calendar of Wales. (0 cases)
(E) - An addition or change only for the Ordinariate in England not observed in Wales.
(W) - An addition or change only for the Ordinariate in Wales not observed in England. (0 cases)
(ew), (e), and (w) - Entries on the National Calendar also observed in the Ordinariate. Not shown here unless required for clarity.

Optional Memorials shown here are added to all others on the same date here, in the corresponding National Calendar(s), and in the General Roman Calendar.

- 12 January – Saint Benedict Biscop, abbot – optional memorial (EW)
- 12 January: Saint Aelred of Rievaulx – Optional Memorial (eW)
- 13 January – Saint Kentigern (Mungo), bishop – optional memorial (EW)
- 1 February – Saint Brigid of Kildare, abbess – optional memorial (EW)
- 4 February – Saint Gilbert of Sempringham, religious – optional memorial (EW)
- 5 March – Saint Piran, abbot – optional memorial (EW)
- 17 March: Saint Patrick, bishop – Feast (eW)
- 16 April – Saint Magnus of Orkney, martyr – optional memorial (EW)
- 19 April – Saint Alphege, bishop and martyr – optional memorial (EW)
- 23 April – Saint George, martyr – Solemnity (eW)
- 24 April – Saint Mellitus, bishop – optional memorial (EW)
- 24 April – Saint Adalbert, bishop and martyr - optional Memorial (eW)
- 4 May – The English Martyrs – Feast (eW)
- 6 May – Saint John the Apostle in Eastertide – optional memorial (EW)
- 21 May – Saint Helena or Saint Godric of Finchale, religious – optional memorial (EW)
- 23 May – Saint Petroc, abbot – optional memorial (EW)
- 24 May – Saint Aldhelm, bishop – optional memorial (EW)
- 25 May – Saint Bede the Venerable, priest and doctor – Memorial (eW)
- 27 May – Saint Augustine of Canterbury, bishop – Feast (eW)
- 28 May – Saint Gregory VII, pope or Saint Mary Magdalene de Pazzi, virgin – Optional Memorial (EW)
- 9 June – Saint Columba, abbot – Optional Memorial (eW)
- 16 June – Saint Richard of Chichester, bishop – Optional Memorial (eW)
- 22 June – Saints John Fisher, bishop and Thomas More, martyrs – Feast (eW)
- 15 July – Saint Bonaventure, bishop and Doctor of the Church; or Saint Swithun, bishop - optional memorials (EW)
- 16 July – Saint Osmund, bishop – optional memorials (EW)
- 20 July – Saint Margaret of Antioch, martyr – optional memorial (EW)
- 5 August – Saint Oswald, martyr – optional memorial (EW)
- 26 August – Blessed Dominic of the Mother of God Barberi, priest – Optional Memorial (eW)
- 30 August – Saints Margaret Clitherow, Anne Line and Margaret Ward, martyrs – Optional Memorial (eW)
- 31 August – Saint Aidan, bishop and the Saints of Lindisfarne – Optional Memorial (eW)
- 3 September – Saint Gregory the Great, pope and doctor – Feast (eW)
- 4 September – Saint Cuthbert, bishop – Optional Memorial (eW)
- 17 September – Saint Ninian, bishop or Saint Edith of Wilton, religious – optional memorials (EW)
- 19 September – Saint Theodore of Canterbury, bishop – Optional Memorial (eW)
- 24 September – Our Lady of Walsingham – solemnity (EW)
- 3 October – Saint Thomas of Hereford, bishop – optional memorial (EW)
- 8 October – Saint Denis and companions, martyrs or Saint John Leonardi, priest – Optional Memorial (9 October in the General Calendar) (EW)
- 9 October – Saint John Henry Newman, priest and Doctor of the Church, patron of the ordinariate – feast (EW)
- 10 October – Saint Paulinus of York, bishop – Optional Memorial (eW)
- 11 October – Saint Ethelburga, abbess – optional memorial (EW)
- 12 October – Saint Wilfrid, bishop – Optional Memorial (eW)
- 13 October – Saint Edward the Confessor – Optional Memorial (eW)
- 19 October – Saint Frideswide, abbess – optional memorial (EW)
- 26 October – Saints Chad and Cedd, bishop – Optional Memorial (eW)
- 7 November – Saint Willibrord, bishop – Optional Memorial (eW)
- 8 November – All Saints of England – feast (E)
- 8 November – All Saints of Wales – feast (w)
- 16 November – Saint Edmund of Abingdon, bishop – Optional Memorial (eW)
- 17 November – Saint Hilda, abbess or Saint Hugh of Lincoln, bishop or Saint Elizabeth of Hungary – Optional Memorial (eW)
- 20 November – Saint Edmund, martyr – optional memorial (EW)
- 1 December – Saint Edmund Campion, priest and martyr – memorial (EW)

== Friends of the Ordinariate ==
Soon after the Personal Ordinariate of Our Lady of Walsingham was established in 2011, a group of lay Catholics founded a separate charity, called the Friends of the Ordinariate of Our Lady of Walsingham, to assist the work and mission of the ordinariate by providing both practical and financial support. The Friends of the Ordinariate, as it is commonly called, was also established in order to raise awareness of the ordinariate's life and mission within the wider Catholic community. The ordinary, Mgr Keith Newton, is the organisation's president. The current chairman is Nicolas Ollivant. Honorary vice presidents include Lord Deben; Charles Moore; The Duke of Norfolk; The Countess of Oxford and Asquith; Katharine, Duchess of Kent and Lord Nicholas Windsor.

== See also ==
- Anglican-Roman Catholic dialogue
- Anglo-Catholicism
- Catholic Church hierarchy#Equivalents of diocesan bishops in law
- Continuing Anglican movement
- Ecumenism
- List of Anglican bishops who converted to Roman Catholicism
- Pontifical Council for Promoting Christian Unity
- Simon Beveridge
