= Andrew Burnham (priest) =

English Anglican bishop and Roman Catholic priest (born 1948)

The Reverend Monsignor Andrew Burnham
- Priest, Personal Ordinariate of Our Lady of Walsingham
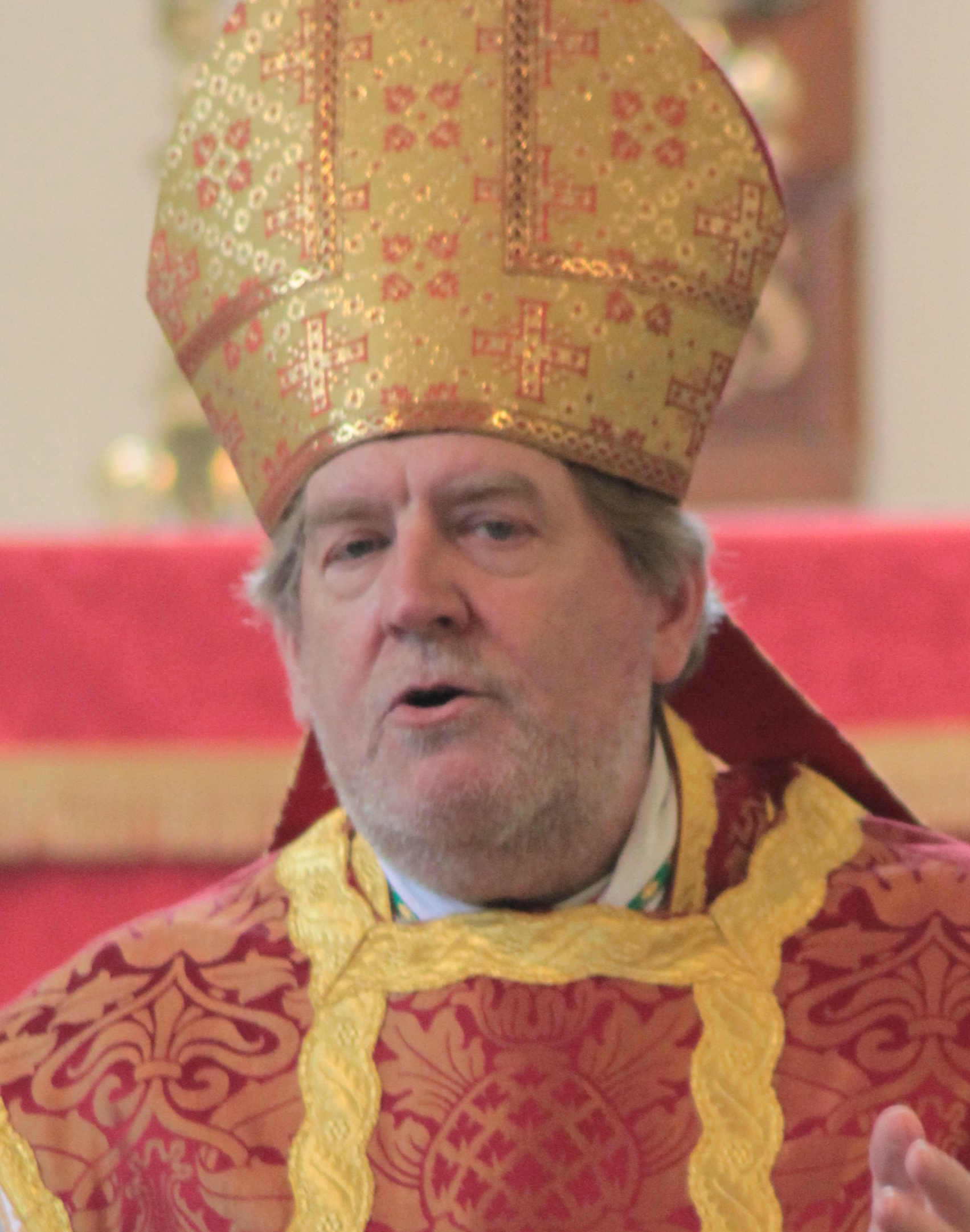
- Burnham as Bishop of Ebbsfleet in 2010
- Church: Roman Catholic Church
- Previous posts: Bishop of Ebbsfleet (Church of England; 2000–2010)

Orders
- Ordination: 13 January 2011 (Catholic Church)
- Consecration: 30 November 2000 (Anglican)

Personal details
- Born: 19 March 1948 (age 78) Worksop, Nottinghamshire, England
- Denomination: Catholicism
- Spouse: Cathy
- Children: 2
- Profession: Priest, former teacher
- Education: New College, Oxford

Andrew Burnham (born 19 March 1948) is an English Catholic priest for the Personal Ordinariate of Our Lady of Walsingham. He was formerly the third bishop of Ebbsfleet in the Church of England and a provincial episcopal visitor in the Province of Canterbury from 2000 to 2010, resigning in order to be received into the Catholic Church. He was ordained as a Catholic priest in 2011.

== Early life ==
Burnham was born in Worksop, Nottinghamshire, received his secondary school education at Southwell Minster Grammar School, in Southwell, Nottinghamshire, and studied music at New College, Oxford. He later studied theology at New College before going on to do a Certificate of Education at Westminster College, Oxford. Following this he became Head of Music at Bilborough Grammar School in Nottingham.

== Anglican ministry ==
Burnham trained for ordained ministry at St Stephen's House, Oxford. He was ordained in the Church of England as a deacon in 1983 and as a priest in 1984. Following ordination he had issues with committing to the priesthood and leaving music, a great passion of his which formed a major part of his life. He was chorus master of the Nottingham Harmonic Society from 1973 to 1985. The Bishop of Southwell therefore suggested that he become a non-stipendiary priest. However, his wife eventually persuaded him to devote himself to full-time ministry.

From 1983 to 1985, Burnham was honorary curate in Clifton in the Diocese of Southwell as a non-stipendiary priest. In 1985 he became curate at St. John the Baptist Church, Beeston, in the same diocese from 1985 until 1987. He then became vicar of the Church of St. John the Evangelist, Carrington, leaving in 1994 following his appointment as vice-principal of St Stephen's House, Oxford, a position he took up in 1995.

On 12 September 2000, Burnham was announced as the next third Bishop of Ebbsfleet, a provincial episcopal visitor (a "flying bishop") who provides episcopal oversight for parishes that reject the ordination of women as priests in the western part of the Province of Canterbury. The appointment was confirmed by Letters Patent issued by Elizabeth II on 22 November 2000. He was consecrated as a bishop on 30 November 2000.

== Catholic ministry ==
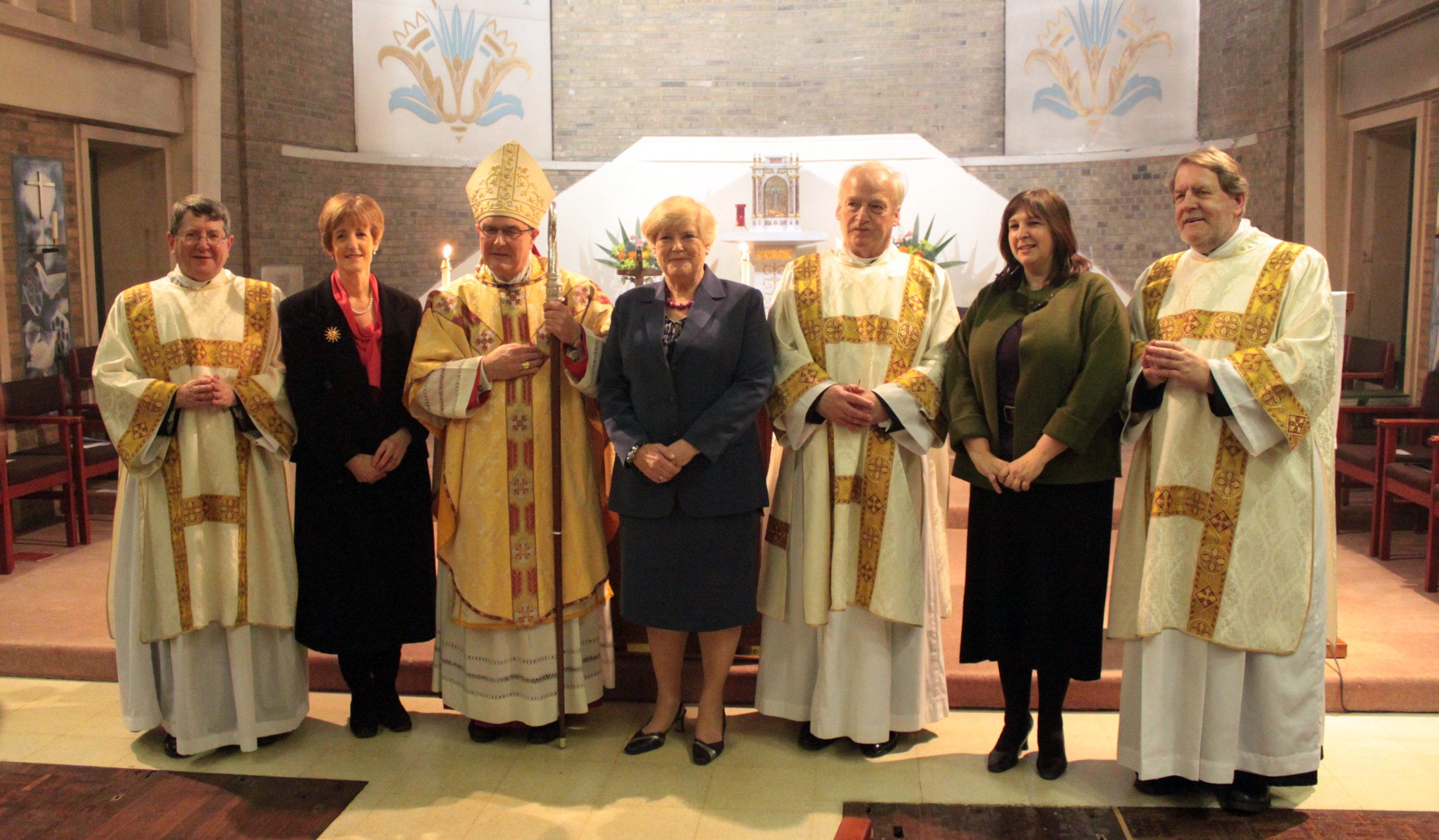
Keith Newton, John Broadhurst, Burnham (far right), and their wives, with Bishop Alan Hopes following their ordination as Catholic deacons

On 8 July 2008, Burnham announced his intention to lead his Anglo-Catholic parishioners into unity with the Catholic Church because of disagreement about provision for those opposed to the proposed ordination of women as bishops in the Church of England. In a column in the Catholic Herald, Burnham asked Pope Benedict XVI to provide a way for his parishioners to join him in the move.

On 8 November 2010, Burnham was one of five Anglican bishops who announced their resignations and their intention to join the proposed personal ordinariate in England and Wales. His resignation took effect on 31 December 2010.

Burnham was received into the Catholic Church in a Mass at Westminster Cathedral on 1 January 2011. Also received at the same ceremony were Keith Newton (former Bishop of Richborough) and his wife, Gill, John Broadhurst (former Bishop of Fulham) and his wife, Judith, and three former sisters of the Society of Saint Margaret (Walsingham) – Carolyne Joseph, Jane Louise and Wendy Renate.

Following his reception into the Catholic Church, on 13 January, Burnham was ordained to the diaconate with two other former Church of England bishops, John Broadhurst and Keith Newton. Two days later, on 15 January, they were also ordained to the priesthood together. On this date the Personal Ordinariate of Our Lady of Walsingham in England and Wales was also officially established. On 17 March it was announced that Burnham had been appointed a Prelate of Honour by the Pope.

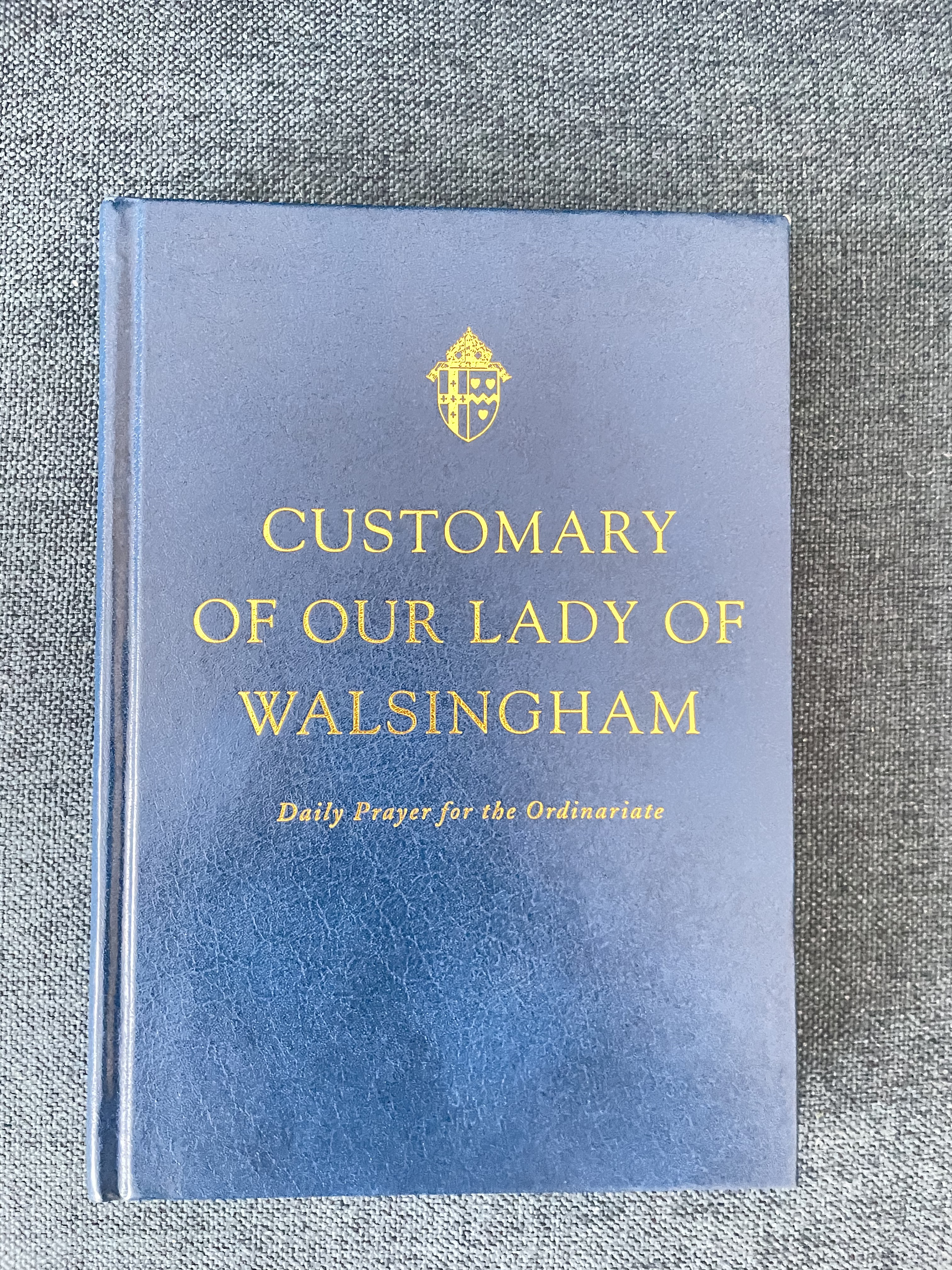

Burnham, alongside Fr Aidan Nichols OP, edited the Customary of Our Lady of Walsingham, which was published in 2012. It contains the Litany and the daily offices, in traditional language as influenced by the Book of Common Prayer.

From 2019 to 2023, Burnham was the parish priest of St Mary's Church, East Hendred, Oxfordshire.

== Personal life ==
In 1984, Burnham married Cathy. Together they have one daughter and one son.

== Selected works ==
- Burnham, Andrew (2000). A Manual of Anglo-Catholic Devotion. Norwich: Canterbury Press. ISBN 978-1853113543.
- Burnham, Andrew (2010). Heaven and Earth in Little Space: The Re-enchantment of Liturgy. Norwich: Canterbury Press. ISBN 9781848250055.
- Burnham, Andrew; Nichols, Aidan (2012). Customary of Our Lady of Walsingham. Norwich: Canterbury Press. ISBN 978-1848251229.

Church of England titles
Preceded by Michael Houghton	Bishop of Ebbsfleet; 2000–2010	Jonathan Baker
