= John Klyberg =

British bishop (1931–2020)

The Reverend Monsignor John Klyberg
- Other post: C of E Bishop of Fulham (1985–1996)

Orders
- Ordination: 1996 (Catholic priest)
- Consecration: 1985 (C of E)
- Rank: Prelate of Honour

Personal details
- Born: Charles John Klyberg; 29 July 1931
- Died: 16 January 2020 (aged 88) Hythe, Kent, England
- Denomination: Roman Catholicism formerly Anglicanism
- Education: Eastbourne College
- Alma mater: Lincoln Theological College
- Military career
- Branch: British Army
- Service years: 1953–1955; 1955–1958 (reserves)
- Rank: Lieutenant
- Unit: Buffs
- Conflicts: Cold War

Charles John Klyberg (29 July 1931 – 16 January 2020) was a British Roman Catholic priest and former Anglican bishop. From 1985 to 1996, he was the Bishop of Fulham in the Church of England.

== Early life and education ==
Klyberg was born on 29 July 1931. He was educated at Eastbourne College, a private school in Eastbourne, Sussex. He trained for ordination at Lincoln Theological College, a Church of England theological college.

Klyberg served in the British Army to satisfy the required National Service. On 19 December 1953, he was commissioned into the Buffs (Royal East Kent Regiment) as a second lieutenant. On 16 May 1955, he transferred to the Territorial Army as a second lieutenant with seniority in that rank from 19 December 1953; this ended his full-time military service and began the required part-time period of service. On 21 August 1955, he was promoted to lieutenant. On 23 October 1958, he transferred to the Territorial Army Reserve of Officers; this ended his military service and began his call up liability. He resigned his commission on 9 July 1960, and this ended his call up liability.

== Ordained ministry ==
=== Church of England ===
He began his ordained ministry with a curacy at St John's, East Dulwich – after which he was the rector of Fort Jameson in Zambia. Following this he was the vicar of Christ Church and St Stephen, Battersea. Later he became the Dean of Lusaka before ordination to the episcopate. He was also the Archdeacon of Charing Cross. An opponent of women priests, he was a Guardian of the Anglican Shrine of Our Lady of Walsingham from 1991 to 1997.

=== Roman Catholic Church ===
In 1996, after retiring from Anglican ministry, Klyberg was received into the Roman Catholic Church. He was ordained a Catholic priest in December 1996. He was later made a Prelate of Honour by Pope John Paul II.

== Personal life ==
In 1994, the gay rights campaign group OutRage! named Klyberg as one of ten closeted homosexual bishops in the Church of England.

Klyberg died on 16 January 2020, aged 88. His Funeral Mass was held on 29 January with Bishop Nicholas Hudson presiding. He was cremated.

Church of England titles
| Preceded by Brian Masters | Bishop of Fulham; 1985–1996 | Succeeded by John Broadhurst |
