= Edwin Barnes =

British Roman Catholic priest (1935–2019)

The Reverend Monsignor Edwin Barnes
- Bishop Emeritus of Richborough (PEV)
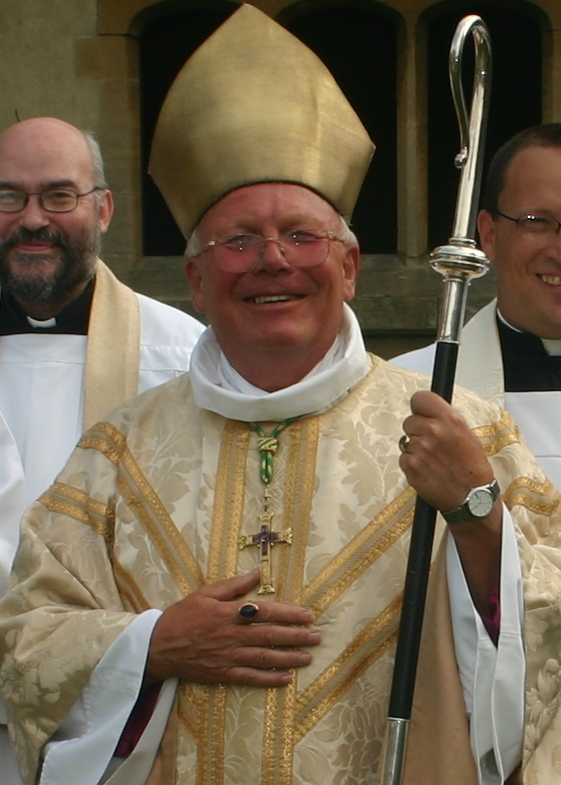
- Barnes in 2005
- Church: Church of England
- Province: Province of Canterbury
- In office: 1995 to 2001
- Predecessor: new appointment
- Successor: Keith Newton
- Other post: Priest of the Personal Ordinariate of Our Lady of Walsingham (from 2011; RCC)
- Previous post: Principal of St Stephen's House, Oxford (1987–1995; CoE)

Orders
- Ordination: 1960 (Anglican deacon); 1961 (Anglican priest); 2011 (Roman Catholic deacon and priest)
- Consecration: 20 July 1995 (Anglican bishop) by George Carey

Personal details
- Born: 6 February 1935
- Died: 6 February 2019 (aged 84)
- Education: Plymouth College
- Alma mater: Pembroke College, Oxford; Cuddesdon College

Edwin Ronald Barnes (6 February 1935 – 6 February 2019) was a British Roman Catholic priest and a former Church of England bishop. He was the Anglican Bishop of Richborough from 1995 to 2001 and was also formerly the president of the Church Union.

== Anglican ministry ==
Barnes was educated at Plymouth College and Pembroke College, Oxford.

He was made a deacon on Trinity Sunday 1960 (12 June) and ordained a priest the next Trinity Sunday (28 May 1961), both times by John Phillips, Anglican Bishop of Portsmouth, at Portsmouth Cathedral. He began his ministry with a curacy at St Mark's North End, Portsmouth. After this he held incumbencies at Farncombe and Hessle. In 1987 he became Principal of St Stephen's House, Oxford, an Anglican theological college.

In 1995, he was chosen to be the first Bishop of Richborough, a provincial episcopal visitor in the Province of Canterbury for traditionalists who reject the ordination of women as priests. He consecrated a bishop at Westminster Abbey on 20 July 1995. He retired in 2001.

== Reception into the Catholic Church ==
In October 2010, Barnes was interviewed by The Tablet magazine on the possibility of joining the proposed personal ordinariate in the Roman Catholic Church for former Anglicans (which was established as the Personal Ordinariate of Our Lady of Walsingham in January 2011). He said that he wanted to join "because the Anglican Church is no longer the one holy and apostolic Church it says it is." On 6 January 2011, Barnes announced that he intended being received into the Catholic Church.

On 21 January 2011 he and his wife, Jane, were received into the Catholic Church at the Church of Our Lady & St Joseph, Lymington by Monsignor Peter Ryan, himself a former Anglican. He was ordained to the diaconate on 11 February 2011 in the domestic chapel at Bishop's House, Portsmouth by Crispian Hollis, Roman Catholic Bishop of Portsmouth. He was ordained to the priesthood on 5 March 2011 by the same bishop in the Cathedral of St John the Evangelist, Portsmouth, for the Personal Ordinariate of Our Lady of Walsingham. In June 2012 he was elevated to the rank of monsignor as a Chaplain of His Holiness.

== Illness and death ==
Barnes died on 6 February 2019, his 84th birthday, following a short illness.

Academic offices
Preceded by David Thomas	Principal of St Stephen's House, Oxford; 1987 to 1995	Succeeded by Jeremy Sheehy
Church of England titles
New creation	Bishop of Richborough; 1995 to 2001	Succeeded by Keith Newton
