= John Broadhurst =

British Roman Catholic priest and former Anglican bishop

The Reverend Monsignor John Broadhurst
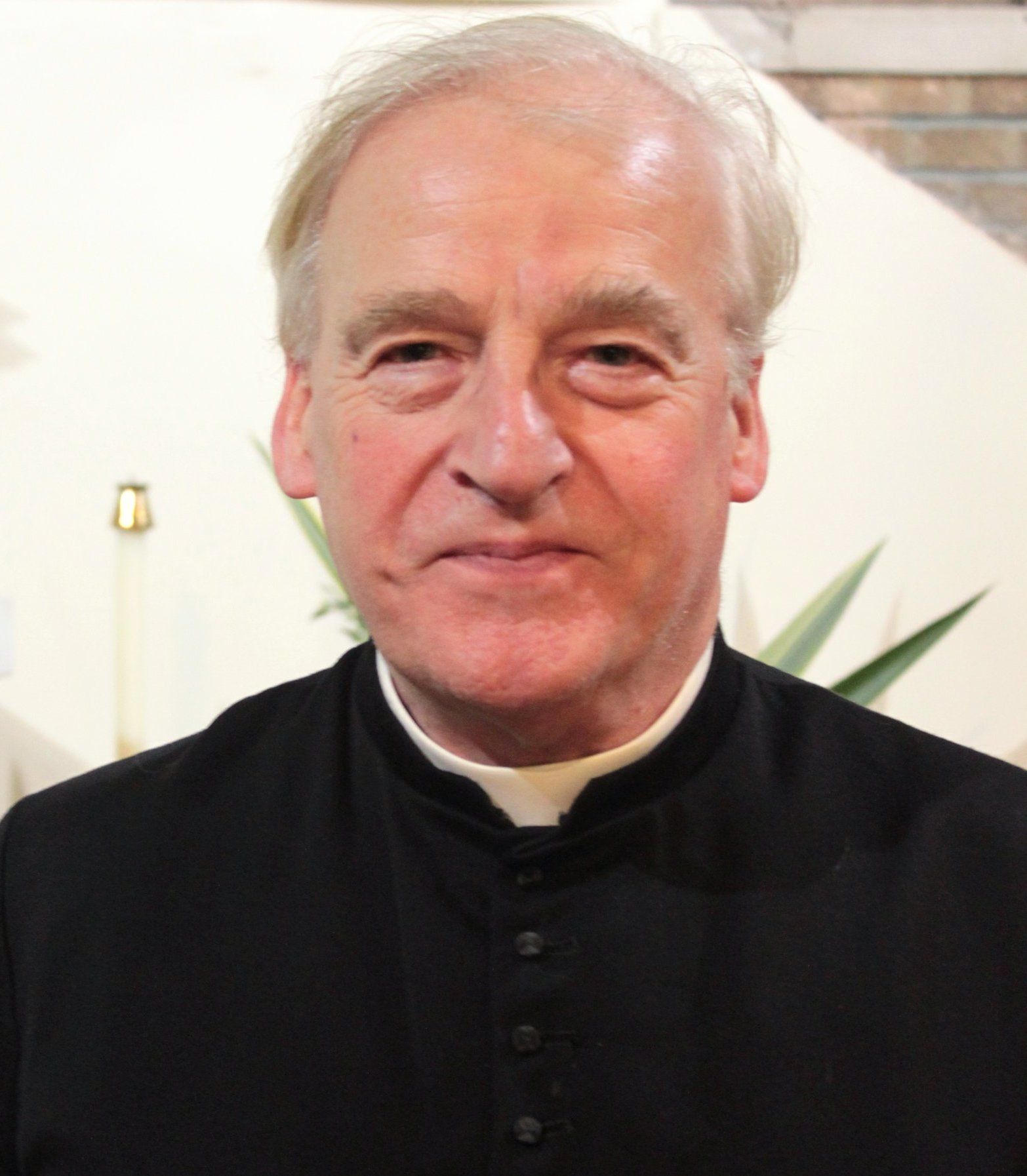
- Broadhurst in 2011
- Church: Roman Catholic Church
- See: Personal Ordinariate of Our Lady of Walsingham
- Other posts: Bishop of Fulham (CofE; 1996–2010)

Orders
- Ordination: 1967 (Anglican priest); 2011 (Catholic priest)
- Consecration: 24 September 1996 (Anglican bishop)
- Rank: Honorary Prelate of His Holiness

Personal details
- Born: 20 July 1942 (age 84)
- Denomination: Roman Catholic (formerly Anglican)
- Spouse: Judi Broadhurst (m. 1965)
- Children: 4
- Education: King's College London

John Charles Broadhurst (born 20 July 1942) is an English Catholic priest who was formerly the Anglican Bishop of Fulham in the Diocese of London from 1996 to 2010. He resigned in order to be received into the Catholic Church and became a priest of the Personal Ordinariate of Our Lady of Walsingham in 2011.

== Early life ==
As a child, Broadhurst was baptised in the Catholic Church. He grew up in Hendon and was educated at Owens School in Islington.

== Anglican ministry ==
Broadhurst trained as an Anglican ordinand at King's College London and its postgraduate facility at St Boniface College, Warminster. He was ordained a deacon in 1966 and a priest in 1967.

Broadhurst began his ordained ministry at St Michael-at-Bowes, Palmerston Road, progressing through St Augustine's Wembley Park to the Parish of Wood Green (known as Wood Green Team Ministry). In 1972, he became the youngest elected member of the General Synod of the Church of England, a position he held until 1996. He became Area Dean of Brent while at Wembley Park, and East Haringey during his time at Wood Green. He was consecrated Bishop of Fulham (a "provincial episcopal visitor") on 24 September 1996. He had "the pastoral care of parishes which are opposed to the ordination of women".

Broadhurst was formerly the chairman of Forward in Faith and vice-chairman of the Church Union.

== Catholic ministry ==
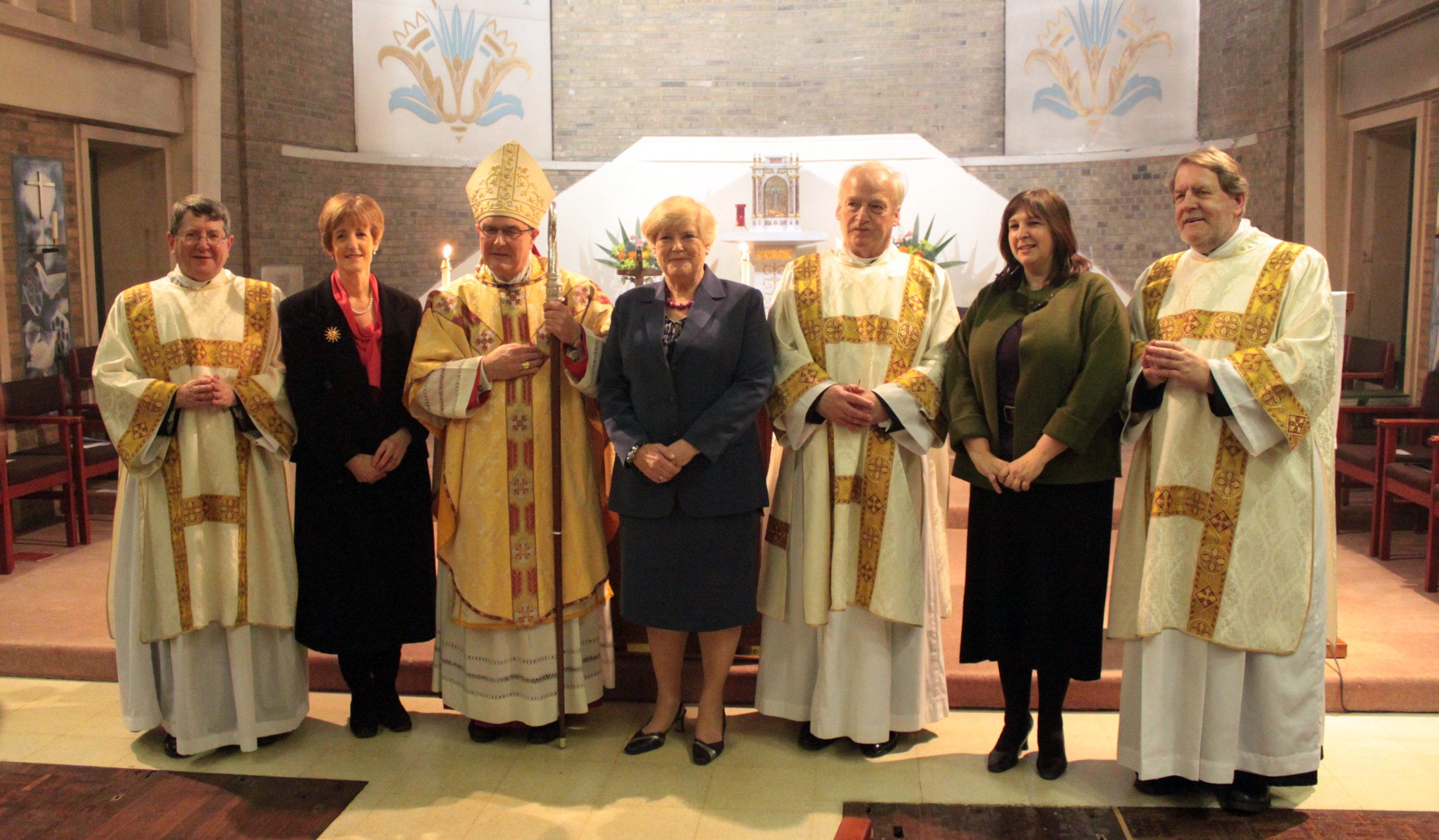
Keith Newton, Broadhurst (third right), Andrew Burnham, and their wives, with Bishop Alan Hopes following their ordination as Catholic deacons

In 2009, there were reports that Cardinal Christoph Schönborn had been meeting Broadhurst at the suggestion of the Pope.

In October 2010, Broadhurst publicly stated his intention of being received into the Catholic Church and entering a personal ordinariate for former Anglicans when it was established. In the same speech, he described the Church of England's General Synod, in respect of its decision about the way in which objectors to the idea of ordaining women as bishops may or may not have legislative provision to protect their interests, as having been "... vindictive and vicious. It has been fascist in its behaviour, marginalising those who have been opposed to women's ordination", in respect of which he later claimed on the BBC's Sunday programme to have been referring only to the House of Clergy in the Church of England's General Synod.

On 8 November 2010, Broadhurst announced that he intended leaving the Church of England to become a Catholic.

Broadhurst was received into the Catholic Church on 1 January 2011 at Westminster Cathedral. Also received at the same ceremony were his wife Judith, Andrew Burnham (former Bishop of Ebbsfleet), Keith Newton (former Bishop of Richborough) and his wife Gill, and three former sisters of the Society of St Margaret (Walsingham)—Sister Carolyne Joseph, Sister Jane Louise and Sister Wendy Renate. On 13 January 2011, he was ordained to the diaconate with the two other former Church of England bishops, Andrew Burnham and Keith Newton. Two days later, they were ordained to the priesthood together. On this date, the Personal Ordinariate of Our Lady of Walsingham in England and Wales was officially established. On 17 March 2011, it was announced that he had been appointed an Honorary Prelate of His Holiness. Since his retirement, he has moved to Northamptonshire where he remains active in a local parish alongside the Ordinariate.

== Personal life ==
In 1965, Broadhurst married his childhood sweetheart, Judith. He and his wife have four children: Jane, Mark, Sarah and Benedict. Broadhurst now has eight grandchildren and two great-grandchildren with another on the way. He is interested in genealogy, gardening and travelling. He was once a beekeeper and a fisherman.

== Styles ==
- The Reverend John Broadhurst (1966–1996)
- The Right Reverend John Broadhurst (1996–2010)
- John Broadhurst (1–13 January 2011)
- The Reverend John Broadhurst (13 January 2011 – 17 March 2011)
- The Right Reverend Monsignor John Broadhurst (17 March 2011 – present)

Church of England titles
Preceded by Charles Klyberg	Bishop of Fulham; 1996–2010	Jonathan Baker
