= Self-supporting minister =

Minister in the Church of England

In the Church of England, self-supporting ministers (SSMs), previously called non-stipendiary ministers (NSMs) or non-stipendiary priests, are ministers who do not receive a stipend. They usually have alternative employment. There were around 2,000 SSMs in the Church of England at the turn of the 21st century and 3,230 in 2016.

Many SSMs identify as Ministers in Secular Employment (MSEs), seeing their work and workplace as the main arena of ministry. The UK national association of MSEs is Christians In Secular Ministry (CHRISM).

== Notable self-supporting ministers ==
- Kate Bottley
- Andrew Burnham, former Bishop of Ebbsfleet
- Lionel Fanthorpe
- Guy Hewitt
- Sarah Mullally before becoming Bishop
- Paula Vennells, former CEO of the Post Office
- John Lees, Church of England’s first National Officer for Self Supporting Ordained Ministry
- Jonathan Aitken
