= Robin Ward (priest) =

British theologian and former Anglican priest

- Principal of St Stephen's House, Oxford
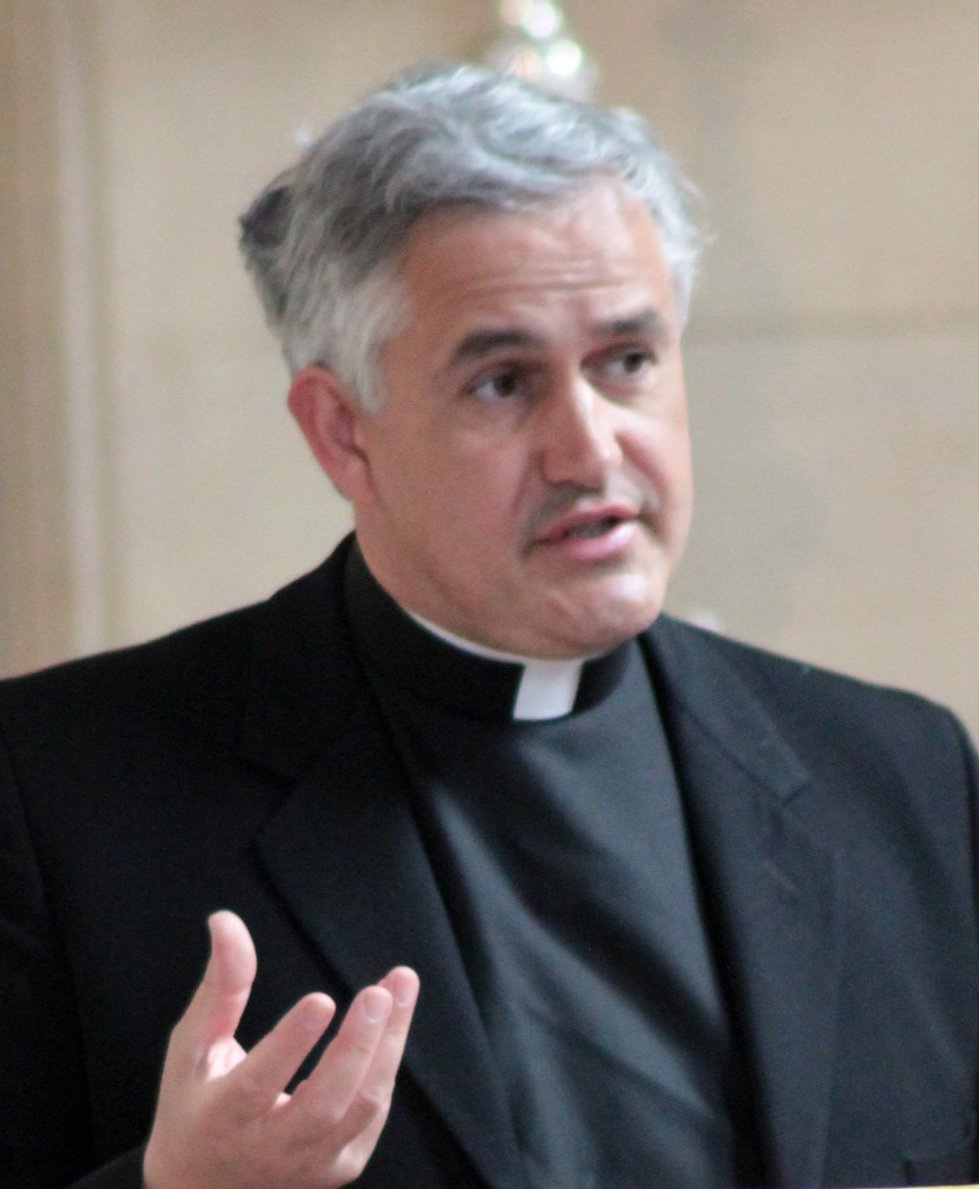
- Ward in 2010
- Church: Church of England
- In office: 2006 to 2025
- Predecessor: Jeremy Sheehy
- Successor: Harri Williams

Orders
- Ordination: 1991 (deacon, C of E); 1992 (priest, C of E)

Personal details
- Born: 24 January 1966 (age 60)
- Denomination: Roman Catholic (formerly Anglican)
- Spouse: Ruth Ward (m. 1997)
- Education: Magdalen College, Oxford; St Stephen's House, Oxford; King's College London

Robin Ward (born 22 January 1966) is a British academic and former Anglican priest. From 2006 to 2025 he was the principal of St Stephen's House, Oxford, an Anglo-Catholic theological college in England. In 2026, he announced that he had been received into the Catholic Church.

== Early life and education ==
Ward studied at Magdalen College, Oxford, graduating with a Bachelor of Arts (BA) degree in 1987; as per tradition, his BA was promoted to a Master of Arts (MA Oxon) degree in 1991. From 1988 to 1991 he trained for holy orders at St Stephen's House, Oxford. Later he received a Doctor of Philosophy (PhD) degree from King's College London, completed in 2003 with a doctoral thesis titled "The Schism at Antioch in the Fourth Century".

== Ordained ministry ==
Ward was ordained deacon in 1991 and priest in 1992. He served as assistant curate of St Andrew's Romford from 1991 to 1994 and of St Andrew's and St Francis of Assisi's Willesden Green from 1994 to 1996. He was the vicar of St John the Baptist's Sevenoaks from 1996 until 2006 and the chaplain of the Invicta Community Care NHS Trust from 1997 to 2006. He was made an honorary canon of Rochester Cathedral in 2004. On 1 September 2006, he became the principal of St Stephen's House, Oxford. He stepped down as principal in April 2025.

Ward represented the Diocese of Rochester in the General Synod of the Church of England. He was a member of the Revision Committee on Ordination Services and a representative of the Catholic Group. He was a member of the Society of the Holy Cross (SSC).

He was created a Companion of the Roll of Honour of the Memorial of Merit of King Charles the Martyr in 2019.

== Reception into the Catholic Church ==
On 14 February 2026, Ward announced on his social media that he had been received into the Catholic Church. He was received at Farnborough Abbey by the abbot, Dom Cuthbert Brogan.

== Personal life ==
Ward married Ruth in 1996. They live in Truro and together they have two sons.

== Arms ==
Coat of arms of Robin Ward
Notes Granted 16 May 2014 (ref: 168/44) As a canon emeritus he replaces the helm and crest with a black galero, three red tassels pendent from black cords on either side. Crest A wildman of the woods genuflecting to the dexter Vert holding in his hands a key wards upwards and inwards Or. Escutcheon Or gutty d'huile fretty Gules nailed Or. Motto Novate Novale

== Selected works ==
- Ward, R. On Christian Priesthood (London 2011), ISBN 978-0-8264-9908-0
- Ward, R. Building Disciplined Lives of Regular Prayer, Study and Worship
- Ward, R. Review of Herbert McCabe, The Good Life: Ethics and the pursuit of happiness
- Ward, R. 'God is Gone Up', Church Times Issue 7416 (29 April 2005)

== Sources and further information ==
- "Appointments", Church Times Issue 7400 (7 January 2005)
- University of Oxford Annual Review 2005/06
- "New appointments: Principal of St Stephen's House", Oxford Blueprint: The newsletter of the University of Oxford (29 June 2006)
- "Staff" at St Stephen's House website
- "St Stephen's House welcomes new Principal"
- "Ordination of women in the Anglican Communion and other Churches"
- General Synod: Ordination Services: Revision Committee
- "Schooling in faith: Oxford’s theological colleges look to the future", The Door (1 September 2006)
- Crockford's Clerical Directory (97th edn, London: Church House Publishing, 2001), p. 788

Academic offices
Preceded by Jeremy Sheehy	Principal of St Stephen's House, Oxford; 2006–2025	Succeeded by Harri Williams
