= Jonathan Baker (bishop) =

Church of England bishop (born 1966)

The Right Reverend Jonathan Baker
- Bishop of Fulham
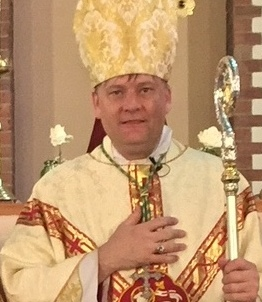
- Baker in 2015
- Church: Church of England
- Diocese: London
- Predecessor: John Broadhurst
- Other posts: Honorary assistant bishop, Southwark (2013–present); Guild Vicar, St Andrew Holborn (2015-present)
- Previous posts: Honorary assistant bishop, Rochester (2013–2015); Bishop of Ebbsfleet (PEV; 2011–2013); Principal of Pusey House (2003–2013)

Orders
- Ordination: 1993 (deacon); 1994 (priest)
- Consecration: 16 June 2011 by Rowan Williams

Personal details
- Born: 6 October 1966 (age 60)
- Denomination: Anglican
- Spouse: Jacqueline (m. 1992; div. 2013) Susie (m. 2015)
- Children: 2 sons, 1 daughter
- Education: St John's College, Oxford; St Stephen's House, Oxford

Jonathan Mark Richard Baker (born 6 October 1966) is a bishop of the Church of England who is currently suffragan Bishop of Fulham, providing alternative episcopal oversight in the dioceses of London, Southwark and Rochester. He was formerly Bishop of Ebbsfleet, providing provincial episcopal oversight to the western half of the Province of Canterbury. He concurrently chairs the council of bishops of The Society under the patronage of Saint Wilfrid and Saint Hilda.

== Early life and education ==
Baker was born on 6 October 1966, and is the son of Sir John William Baker. He was educated at Merchant Taylors' School, Northwood, an all-boys public school in Hertfordshire. He studied at St John's College, Oxford. He trained for ordination at St Stephen's House, Oxford.

== Ordained ministry ==
Baker was ordained in the Church of England as a deacon in 1993 and as a priest in 1994. He was an assistant curate at All Saints' Ascot Heath from 1993 to 1996. He was then priest in charge of St Mark's Reading and Vicar of Holy Trinity, Reading. From 2002 until 2013, he was Principal of Pusey House.

=== Episcopal ministry ===
Following his appointment as the suffragan Bishop of Ebbsfleet, the provincial episcopal visitor for the western half of the Province of Canterbury, Baker was consecrated as a bishop at Southwark Cathedral on 16 June 2011. His appointment as an assistant bishop in the Diocese of Bath and Wells (an honorary role which facilitates his oversight of parishes in that diocese) was announced in September 2011. He was legally translated to the See of Fulham on Ash Wednesday (13 February) 2013. He has been Guild Vicar of St Andrew Holborn in the City of London since 2015.

On 18 April 2023, Baker and a group of around fifty Church of England priests celebrated a Eucharist at an altar near the Cathedra of the Archbasilica of St John Lateran as part of a conference for Anglo-Catholic clergy. Complaints were raised by many Catholics as to whether the celebration was a "contravention of canonical norms". Auxiliary Bishop Emeritus Guerino Di Tora of the Diocese of Rome (Chapter Vicar of the Lateran Basilica) expressed "deep regret for what happened". Father Martin Browne OSB an official at the Dicastery for Promoting Christian Unity noted the apology, but said, “I also think that everyone acted in good faith and without any intent to cause offense or embarrassment to anyone else. That the celebration has caused comment is perhaps, above all else, a reminder of the need to pray continually for the Lord's gift of unity, so that all may one day celebrate at the same altar the saving mysteries of the one Lord.”

Baker is a member of the Council of Bishops of The Society under the patronage of Saint Wilfrid and Saint Hilda. He became chairman of the Council of Bishops on Saint Andrew's Day (30 November) 2023.

=== Views ===
From 2010 to 2014, Baker was the chairman of Forward in Faith, a traditionalist Anglo-Catholic membership organisation which supports and finances the work of The Society. The Society, which is governed by a Council of Bishops chaired by Baker, rejects the ordination of women to the priesthood and episcopate in the Church of England.

In 2023, following the news that the House of Bishops of the Church of England was to introduce proposals for blessing same-sex relationships, he signed an open letter which stated:

many Christians in the Church of England and the Anglican Communion, together with Christians from across the churches of world Christianity, continue to believe that marriage is given by God for the union of a man and woman and that it cannot be extended to those who are of the same sex. [...] Without seeking to diminish the value of many committed same-sex relationships, for which there is much to give thanks, we find ourselves constrained by what we sincerely believe the Scriptures teach which cannot be set aside.

== Personal life ==
Baker was previously a Freemason. While a student at Oxford University, he joined the Apollo University Lodge, a masonic lodge associated with the university, and served as its Worshipful Master. He held the senior position of Deputy Grand Chaplain in the United Grand Lodge of England. After twenty years membership, he left the organisation upon being appointed a bishop, stating that the criticism from some members of General Synod threatened to overshadow the inauguration of his episcopal ministry.

In 1992, Baker married Jacqueline. Together they had three children; two sons and one daughter. They divorced in 2013.

In a letter dated 22 October 2014, Baker wrote to his clergy informing them that he had been given permission by Richard Chartres, Bishop of London, and Justin Welby, Archbishop of Canterbury, to remarry following divorce. Until 2010, Church of England clergy who had been divorced and remarried could not become bishops. American religion commentator and Episcopal Priest, The Rev. George Conger, wrote, "They [traditionalist clergy] are at a loss to understand how the bishop dedicated to providing pastoral support for traditionalists can himself adopt a stance at odds with the position of most traditionalists – and at odds with the public position taken by Forward in Faith on divorce and remarriage." In 2015, he married Susie in a civil ceremony.

On 25 July 2025, Baker, wearing a dressing gown, interrupted a public performance by the City Academy Voices choir at the Church of St Andrew, Holborn, asking that the choir and audience leave. This happened shortly after 10pm, though the choir had booked the venue for a further hour. The bishop subsequently sent a written apology to all members of the choir, acknowledging that the church had been booked until 11pm and that he had been mistaken to think otherwise.

== Styles ==
- Mr Jonathan Baker (1966–1993)
- The Reverend Jonathan Baker (1993–2011)
- The Right Reverend Jonathan Baker (2011–present)

Church of England titles
Preceded by Andrew Burnham	Bishop of Ebbsfleet; 2011–2013	Succeeded by Jonathan Goodall
Preceded by John Broadhurst	Bishop of Fulham; 2013–present	Incumbent
