= David Waller (bishop) =

English Catholic bishop (born 1961)

The Right Reverend David Waller
- Bishop of the Personal Ordinariate of Our Lady of Walsingham
- Church: Catholic Church
- Province: Immediately subject to the Holy See
- See: Personal Ordinariate of Our Lady of Walsingham
- Appointed: 29 April 2024
- Installed: 23 June 2024
- Predecessor: Keith Newton
- Previous post: Vicar general (2020–2024)

Orders
- Ordination: 1992 (Anglican priest) by Eric Kemp; 2011 (Catholic priest) by Thomas McMahon
- Consecration: 22 June 2024 by Víctor Manuel Fernández

Personal details
- Born: 10 June 1961 (age 65)
- Denomination: Roman Catholicism (formerly Anglicanism)
- Education: College of Ripon and York St John; Chichester Theological College

Ordination history
History
Diaconal ordination
- Ordained by: Thomas McMahon
Priestly ordination
- Ordained by: Thomas McMahon
Episcopal consecration
- Principal consecrator: Víctor Manuel Fernández
- Co-consecrators: Vincent Nichols, Steven Joseph Lopes

David Arthur Waller (born 10 June 1961) is an English bishop of the Roman Catholic Church. Since 2024, Waller has been the ordinary of the Personal Ordinariate of Our Lady of Walsingham. He was formerly a priest in the Church of England before converting to Catholicism in 2011. As he is celibate, he was eligible to be consecrated as a Catholic bishop, unlike his predecessor, as ordinary.

== Early life and education ==
Waller was born in London, England on 10 June 1961. He was educated at St David and St Katharine Church of England Secondary School in Hornsey, London, and the College of Ripon and York St John. Having been a community worker in Bradford, he then trained for Anglican ministry at Chichester Theological College, an Anglo-Catholic theological college.

== Church of England ==
Waller was ordained a Church of England deacon in 1991 and as a priest in 1992 by Bishop Eric Kemp. He served in the Diocese of Chichester as a curate (1991–1995) and then as team vicar of Crawley (1995–2000). He then served as vicar of the Parish of St Saviour, Walthamstow, in the Diocese of Chelmsford from 2000 until he left the Church of England to join the Roman Catholic Church.

In addition to his parish ministry, he was a member of the House of Clergy in the General Synod of the Church of England from 2005 to 2010.

== Roman Catholic Church ==
On 24 April 2011, Waller officially converted from Anglicanism to the Roman Catholic Church. He was ordained as a Catholic deacon on 14 May 2011 and as a priest on 11 June 2011, both times by Thomas McMahon, Bishop of Brentwood. He was parochial administrator of St John the Baptist church, Ilford, from 2011 to 2015, and then parish priest of Christ the King, Chingford, from 2015 to 2024. In 2020, he was additionally appointed vicar general of the Personal Ordinariate of Our Lady of Walsingham by its ordinary, Keith Newton.

=== Episcopal ministry ===
On 29 April 2024, it was announced that Pope Francis had appointed Waller as the next ordinary of the Personal Ordinariate of Our Lady of Walsingham. He is celibate and was, therefore, consecrated as the first bishop-ordinary of Our Lady of Walsingham; his predecessor, Newton, was married and, therefore, ineligible for the episcopate.

His episcopal consecration took place on 22 June 2024 at Westminster Cathedral with Cardinal Víctor Manuel Fernández as the principal consecrator, and Cardinal Vincent Nichols and Bishop Steven J. Lopes as principal co-consecrators. He is also the first bishop of any of the three personal ordinariates that has served as an ordinariate priest rather than being an external appointment. The following day, he took canonical possession of the Ordinariate and was installed as its bishop-ordinary at Church of Our Lady of the Assumption and St Gregory, Westminster.

On 2 July 2024, Waller undertook his first ordination: that of Richard Pain, a former Anglican bishop, to the diaconate. He then undertook his first ordinations to the priesthood of four men, including Pain, on 20 July.

Catholic Church titles
Preceded by Keith Newton as Ordinary	Bishop of the Personal Ordinariate of Our Lady of Walsingham; 2024 to present	Incumbent
