= Simon Beveridge =

British Catholic priest

The Reverend Simon Beveridge
- Born: 1961 (age 64–65)
- Education: University of Nottingham; Chichester Theological College

Ecclesiastical career
- Church: Roman Catholic Church; Church of England (former)
- Ordained: 1987 (Anglican deacon); 1988 (Anglican priest); 2017 (Catholic deacon & priest)
- Military career
- Allegiance: United Kingdom
- Branch: Royal Navy; Royal Marines
- Service years: 1993–2015
- Rank: Chaplain
- Unit: Royal Navy Chaplaincy Service

Simon Alexander Ronald Beveridge (born 1961) is a British Roman Catholic priest. He was formerly an Anglican priest and Royal Navy chaplain. He was one of the handful of Commando trained chaplains. He has also competed in amateur horse racing, thus earning the nickname "The Galloping Padre".

== Early life and education ==
Beveridge was born in 1961. He studied at the University of Nottingham, graduating with a Bachelor of Arts (BA) degree in 1984. From 1984 to 1987, he trained for Holy Orders at Chichester Theological College, an Anglo-Catholic theological college.

== Ordained ministry ==
=== Church of England ===
Beveridge was ordained in the Church of England as a deacon in 1987 and as a priest in 1988. He was the vicar of Down St Mary.

In 1993, he joined the Royal Navy as a chaplain and passed his commando course in the same year. He subsequently served with 42 Commando Royal Marines and served on operations in Sierra Leone.

Beveridge is also known as the "Galloping Padre" since he learned to ride (at Mr Frost's Yard at Buckfastleigh) whilst serving with the Royal Marines at CTCRM Lympstone in 2004. While serving in HMS Bulwark in 2005 he took the Amateur National Hunt Jockey's course at the British Racing School in Newmarket and gained his Category 'A' racing licence. In December 2007 he became the first priest to win a point-to-point with a 50–1 victory at Wadebridge. In 2008, aged 46, and whilst chaplain at the Royal Naval Air Station Yeovilton, he represented the Navy at the Grand Military Cup and became the first Navy chaplain to ride at Sandown, though he fell on the last circuit after being intercepted by a riderless horse.

He was an early advocate of the Royal Navy/Royal Marines Trauma Risk Management project (TRIM) and used the technique when, as chaplain to Commando Helicopter Force, a helicopter crashed on the flight deck of RFA Argus, injuring three men, one very gravely.

Beveridge's final posting was as chaplaincy team leader at HM Naval Base Clyde. He retired from the Royal Navy on 12 March 2016.

=== Roman Catholic Church ===
After leaving the Royal Navy, Beveridge undertook the Academic Programme of Formation for Catholic Priesthood in London from September 2016. On 17 June 2017, he was ordained as a deacon of the Roman Catholic Church by Robert Byrne, Auxiliary Bishop for Birmingham. Beveridge serves the Personal Ordinariate of Our Lady of Walsingham in Scotland. He was ordained to the priesthood by William Nolan, Bishop of Galloway, on 14 December 2017.

== Personal life ==
Beveridge and his wife Sarah have two children and lived in Devon before moving to Wigtownshire, in Galloway, Scotland.
