= Jeremy Sheehy =

British Anglican priest and academic

The Reverend Jeremy Sheehy
- Rector of Swinton and Pendlebury
- Church: Church of England
- Diocese: Manchester
- In office: 2006 to present
- Other post: Principal of St Stephen's House, Oxford (1996 to 2006)

Orders
- Ordination: 1981 (deacon); 1982 (priest)

Personal details
- Born: Jeremy Patrick Sheehy; 31 October 1956 (age 69)
- Denomination: Anglican
- Education: Trinity School of John Whitgift; Bristol Grammar School; King Edward's School, Birmingham
- Alma mater: Magdalen College, Oxford; St Stephen's House, Oxford; New College, Oxford

Jeremy Patrick Sheehy (born 31 October 1956) is a British Anglican priest and academic. Since 2006, he has served as rector of St Peter's Church, Swinton and Pendlebury, in the Diocese of Manchester. He was previously a parish priest in the Diocese of Birmingham and the Diocese of Chelmsford, dean of divinity at New College, Oxford (1984–1990), and principal of St Stephen's House, Oxford (1996–2006).

== Early life and education ==
Sheehy was born on 31 October 1956. He was educated at Trinity School of John Whitgift (an all-boys private school in the London Borough of Croydon), Bristol Grammar School (then a direct grant grammar school in Bristol) at King Edward's School, Birmingham (an all-boys independent school in Birmingham). He studied jurisprudence at Magdalen College, Oxford, graduating with a first class Bachelor of Arts (BA) degree in 1978: as per tradition, his BA was promoted in 1981 to a Master of Arts (MA Oxon) degree.

While studying for his first degree and having been sponsored by his home diocese of the Diocese of Birmingham, Sheehy attended a selection conference for ordained ministry in the Church of England. In 1978, he entered St Stephen's House, Oxford, an Anglo-Catholic theological college, to train for holy orders and study theology. Following his studies, he graduated from the University of Oxford with a further first class BA degree. He left theological college in 1981 to be ordained. He later undertook postgraduate research at New College, Oxford: he completed his Doctor of Philosophy (DPhil) degree in 1990 with a thesis titled "The sinlessness of Christ as a problem in modern systematic theology".

== Ordained ministry ==
Sheehy was ordained in the Church of England as a deacon in 1981 and as a priest in 1982. From 1981 to 1983, he served his curacy at St Barnabas' Church, Erdington in the Diocese of Birmingham. From 1983 to 1984, he served a further curacy at St Gregory the Great's Church, Small Heath. In 1984, he left the Diocese of Birmingham to return to the University of Oxford where he had been appointed dean of divinity, chaplain and fellow of New College, Oxford. While at New College, he worked to increase chapel attendance and also taught law and theology. In 1990, he returned to parish ministry having been appointed vicar of the Church of St Margaret with St Columba, Leytonstone, in the Diocese of Chelmsford. He was additionally appointed priest-in-charge of nearby St Andrew's Church, Leytonstone, in 1993.

In 1996, Sheehy once more returned to Oxford having been appointed principal of St Stephen's House, Oxford, in succession to Edwin Barnes. St Stephen's House is an Anglo-Catholic theological college and a permanent private hall of the University of Oxford. He also served as chair of the Oxford Partnership for Theological Education and Training (OPTET) between 1999 and 2001: the OPTET consists of the numerous theological colleges and halls in and surrounding Oxford.

In 2006, after ten years heading the college, Sheehy was appointed team rector of St Peter's Church, Swinton and Pendlebury, in the Diocese of Manchester. The benefice receives alternative episcopal oversight from the Bishop of Beverley. Since 2008, he has also been an examining chaplain to the Bishop of Manchester and teaches doctrine at the All Saints Centre for Mission and Ministry, a part-time training course covering the North-West, Isle of Man and East Midlands. From 2011 to 2013, he was additionally the Area Dean of Eccles.

=== Views ===
Sheehy belongs to the traditionalist Catholic tradition of the Church of England. As such, he rejects the ordination of women and supports the traditional definition of marriage (of one man and one woman). He is regional vicar for the North of England and Scotland Region of the Society of the Holy Cross (SSC).

== Honours ==
In 2004, Sheehy was awarded an honorary Doctor of Divinity (DDhc) by the Graduate Theological Foundation. In 2009, he was awarded a DDhc degree by Nashotah House in Wisconsin.

Academic offices
Preceded by Edwin Barnes	Principal of St Stephen's House, Oxford; 1996 to 2006	Succeeded by Robin Ward
