= John Saward =

John Saward (born in 1947) is a Roman Catholic priest. He is a Senior Research Fellow at Blackfriars at the University of Oxford in England. He previously held the posts of lecturer in dogmatic theology at St Cuthbert's College, Ushaw (1980–1992), Professor of Systematic Theology at St Charles Borromeo Seminary in Philadelphia, Pennsylvania (1992–1998), Professor of Dogmatic Theology at the International Theological Institute, Gaming, Austria, and visiting professor in Systematic Theology and Christology in the same institute.

== Biography ==
Saward completed a BA in (philosophy and psychology) (St John's College) and a postgraduate diploma in theology (St Stephen's House) at the University of Oxford in 1969. In 1973, he completed MA and M.Litt. degrees, also at Oxford, the latter for a thesis on "The Theology of Death". Ordained an Anglican priest in 1972, he was chaplain and a Junior Research Fellow at Lincoln College, Oxford. He was received into the Roman Catholic Church in 1979. He was later ordained in the Roman Catholic Church under papal dispensation which accepted his marriage to his wife Christine (they have three daughters). He is parish priest of SS. Gregory & Augustine's, Oxford, and is prior of the Priestly Fraternity of St Dominic (Dominican Tertiaries) in England.

== Writings and scholarship ==
Saward's published works include The Mysteries of March: Hans Urs von Balthasar on the Incarnation and Easter (1990), Redeemer in the Womb: Jesus Living in Mary (1993), Christ is the Answer: The Christ-centred teaching of Pope John Paul II (1995), The Beauty of Holiness (1996), The Way of the Lamb: The Spirit of Childhood and the End of Age (1999), Cradle of Redeeming Love: The Theology of the Christmas Mystery (2002) and Sweet and Blessed Country: The Christian Hope for Heaven (2005). He has been responsible for the English translations of works by Hans Urs von Balthasar, Pope Benedict XVI and Cardinal Christoph Schönborn.

Saward has been described by Father Aidan Nichols as "the Balthasar of the English-speaking world". However, in recent years, Saward appears to have come to share the growing unease among some Catholics about the nature and origin of Balthasar's theology. In his 2005 work, The Sweet and Blessed Country, he describes Balthasar's theory of universal hope as “a kind of blasphemy”. Alyssa Pitstick, one of the Swiss theologian's critics, studied under Saward at the International Theological Institute.

Saward's work has been evolving not only in content but also in method and style towards a form which combines "ressourcement" with the rigour of scholasticism. Sacred art also plays a prominent role in this method.

== Bibliography ==
=== Books ===
- The Mysteries of March: Hans Urs von Balthasar on the Incarnation and Easter (1990)
- Redeemer in the Womb: Jesus Living in Mary (1993)
- Christ is the Answer: The Christ-centred teaching of Pope John Paul II (1995)
- The Beauty of Holiness (1996)
- The Way of the Lamb: The Spirit of Childhood and the End of Age (1999)
- Cradle of Redeeming Love: The Theology of the Christmas Mystery (2002)
- Sweet and Blessed Country: The Christian Hope for Heaven (2005)

=== Book reviews ===
Year	Review article	Work(s) reviewed
2021	Saward, John (January 2021). "[Untitled review]". New Blackfriars. 102 (1097): 143–145. doi:10.1111/nbfr.12619. S2CID 230593743.	Dauphinais, Michael; Andrew Hofer OP & Roger Nutt, eds. (2019). Thomas Aquinas and the Greek Fathers. Sapientia Press of Ave Maria University.
