= Bishop of Fulham =

English Anglican bishop

The Bishop of Fulham is a suffragan bishop in the Diocese of London in the Church of England. The bishopric is named after Fulham, an area of south-west London; the see was erected under the Suffragans Nomination Act 1888 by Order in Council dated 1 February 1926.

Until 1980 the Bishop of Fulham was the bishop with episcopal oversight (delegated from the Bishop of London) of churches in northern and central Europe. In that year, responsibility for these parishes was transferred to the Bishop of Gibraltar as head of the renamed Diocese of Gibraltar in Europe.

At present, the Bishop of Fulham fulfils the role of a provincial episcopal visitor for the dioceses of London and Southwark. This means having pastoral oversight of those parishes in the Anglo-Catholic tradition which cannot, on grounds of theological conviction, accept the ordination of women to the priesthood and episcopate, or bishops who have participated in ordaining women. As of December 2017, 46 parishes in the Diocese of London (almost one eighth of the total number) receive alternative episcopal oversight (AEO) from the Bishop of Fulham.

In November 2010, following the announcement of Bishop John Broadhurst's resignation and reception into the Catholic Church, the Bishop of London temporarily conferred episcopal oversight for traditionalist congregations in the two dioceses to the Bishop of Edmonton. On 31 October 2012 it was announced that Jonathan Baker, then Bishop of Ebbsfleet, would translate to Fulham, resuming Broadhurst's AEO responsibilities. This took place on 13 February 2013.

== List of bishops ==
Bishop coadjutor in Northern and Central Europe
From	Until	Incumbent	Notes
1884	1886	Jonathan Titcomb	former Bishop of Rangoon
1886	1911	Edward Wilkinson	former Bishop of Zululand
1911	1926	Herbert Bury	translated from British Honduras; afterwards an Assistant Bishop of London

Bishops of Fulham (oversight over northern and central Europe)
From	Until	Incumbent	Notes
1926	1947	Staunton Batty	
1947	1949	William Selwyn	
1949	1955	George Ingle	Translated to Willesden
1955	1957	Robert Stopford	Translated to Peterborough
1957	1966	Roderic Coote	Translated to Colchester
1966	1970	Alan Rogers	
1970	1980	John Satterthwaite	Also Bishop of Gibraltar

Bishops of Fulham (extended episcopal oversight from 1993)
From	Until	Incumbent	Notes
1982	1985	Brian Masters	Translated to Edmonton
1985	1996	John Klyberg	Became a Roman Catholic in 1996
1996	2010	John Broadhurst SSC	Resigned on 31 December 2010 to become a Roman Catholic
2010	2013	Vacant	Extended episcopal oversight exercised by the Bishop of Edmonton.
2013	present	Jonathan Baker	Translated from Ebbsfleet.

== See also ==
- Bishop of Beverley
- Bishop of Ebbsfleet
- Bishop of Richborough
- List of Anglo-Catholic churches in England
