= Lawrence-Jones baronets =

Baronetcy in the Baronetage of the United Kingdom

The Jones, later Lawrence-Jones Baronetcy, of Cranmer Hall in the County of Norfolk, is a title in the Baronetage of the United Kingdom. It was created on 30 September 1831 for Major-General Sir John Jones, 1st Baronet, who had earlier fought with distinction in the Peninsular War. He married Catherine, daughter of Effingham Lawrence.

The second Baronet was murdered by robbers at Macri near Dalaman in Turkey. The fifth Baronet was an author and published several memoirs as L. E. Jones. His works include "Victorian Boyhood", "Edwardian Youth" and "Georgian Afternoon". The sixth Baronet assumed the additional surname of Lawrence.

Herbert Jones, second son of the third Baronet, was suffragan Bishop of Lewes.

== Jones, later Lawrence-Jones baronets, of Cranmer Hall (1831) ==
- Sir John Thomas Jones, 1st Baronet, Knight Commander of the KCB, 1st Baronet (1783–1843)
- Sir Lawrence Jones, 2nd Baronet (1817–1845), murdered by brigands in Makri, Turkey
- Sir Willoughby Jones, 3rd Baronet (1820–1884)
- Sir Lawrence John Jones, 4th Baronet (1857–1954)
- Sir Lawrence Evelyn Jones, MC, 5th Baronet (1885–1969)
- Sir Christopher Lawrence-Jones, 6th Baronet (born 1940)

The heir apparent is the present holder's son Mark Christopher Lawrence-Jones (born 1968).

Baronetage of the United Kingdom
Preceded by Heygate baronets	Jones baronets Cranmer Hall; 30 September 1831	Succeeded by Lawson baronets
