= Mathematical model (disambiguation) =

A mathematical model may mean a description of a physical system using mathematical concepts and language. "Mathematical model" may also refer to:

- Model theory, a branch of mathematical logic, in which a model is an abstract structure that satisfies a set of logical sentences
- Physical models of mathematical objects, created for instructional or artistic purposes, including:
  - Polyhedron model, a physical model of a polyhedron
  - Mathematical Models (Cundy and Rollett), a book about constructing models of mathematical objects for secondary-school education
  - Mathematical Models (Fischer), a book of photographs and commentary on university collections of physical models of mathematical objects

== See also ==
- Model (disambiguation)
