= Douglas Quadling =

English mathematician and school master (1926–2015)

Douglas Quadling OBE
- Born: February 1926
- Died: 25 March 2015 (aged 89); Cambridge
- Known for: School Mathematics Project

Douglas Arthur Quadling (1926–2015) was an English mathematician, school master and educationalist who was one of the four drivers behind the School Mathematics Project (SMP) in the 1960s and 70s.

== Life ==
Quadling was educated at the City of London School. In 1939 the school was moved out of London, at the start of World War II, with most of the pupils attending Marlborough College though not accommodated there. Quadling had use of the College library at weekends, was influenced by Gordon Nobbs, one of the masters, and decided on a teaching career. In 1943 he won a scholarship to Emmanuel College, Cambridge.

Graduating as a wrangler, with a two-year Part II in the Mathematical Tripos, Quadling worked briefly at the end of the war at Fort Halstead for the Ministry of Supply. At this period, based near Orpington, he met and influenced the young Michael Saward, who found him "a pleasant if somewhat owlish young man", while canvassing support for the Crusaders.

Quadling taught at Mill Hill School from 1946 to 1952. He was at Marlborough College from 1952 to 1967, becoming Head of Mathematics and a housemaster (C2). He was then a tutor at the Cambridge Institute of Education, from 1968 to 1985.

As a novice mathematics teacher in the late 1940s, Quadling joined the Mathematical Association, serving as its President in 1980–1. He spoke at a mathematics education conference in Ghana in 1968. He took over from Edwin A. Maxwell as editor of the Mathematical Gazette in 1971; his successor in 1980 was Victor Bryant. In 1983 he was awarded the OBE for services to mathematical education. He married Ruth Starte of the Cambridge Institute of Education.

== Creation of School Mathematics Project ==
The School Mathematics Project, which changed the course of mathematics teaching in Britain, arose from a meeting between Quadling and three others, Martyn Cundy of Sherborne School, Tom Jones of Winchester College and Professor Bryan Thwaites of University of Southampton, in September 1961. Cundy, like Quadling, was involved with the Mathematical Association.

By 1963 the compilation of new SMP mathematics syllabuses had been given to Cundy, Jones, Quadling and T. D. Morris of Charterhouse School. From July 1964 three examination boards offered an SMP syllabus for the General Certificate of Education. When the A-level syllabus was constructed, Cundy and Quadling wrote with John Durran, Laurence Ellis, Colin Goldsmith, Tim Lewis and others.

== Views ==
In public life, Quadling was known for lamenting the state of mathematics education, advocating the need for university courses which were more practical and scientific, in contrast to, say, the exacting Mathematical Tripos at the University of Cambridge. It was at school level, however, that he had greatest influence, through the SMP.

== Selected publications ==
Quadling was head-hunted as a textbook writer at the Mathematical Association conference in 1955, by the authors C. V. Durell and Alan Robson (Marlborough College), and A. V. Ready of George Bell & Sons. There resulted his books on mechanics with A. R. D. Ramsay, also of Marlborough. His textbooks are noted for their mathematical rigour and thoroughness, and their attention to practical application.

Textbooks

- D.A. Quadling (1 December 1955), Mathematical Analysis, Oxford University Press, ISBN 0-19-832518-5
- D.A. Quadling; A.R.D. Ramsay (1971) [1959 1st ed.], Elementary Mechanics, vol. 1 (Metric, 2nd ed.), Bell and Hyman, ISBN 0-7135-1690-9
- D.A. Quadling; A.R.D. Ramsay (1971) [1957 1st ed.], Elementary Mechanics, vol. 2 (Metric, 2nd ed.), Bell and Hyman, ISBN 0-7135-1700-X
- Douglas Quadling (2004), Mechanics 1 for OCR, Cambridge University Press, ISBN 0-521-54900-0
- Douglas Quadling (2004), Mechanics 2 for OCR, Cambridge University Press, ISBN 0-521-54901-9
- Douglas Quadling (2005), Mechanics 3 and 4 for OCR, Cambridge University Press, ISBN 0-521-54902-7
