= Sortie =

Brief excursion of one military unit from a strongpoint

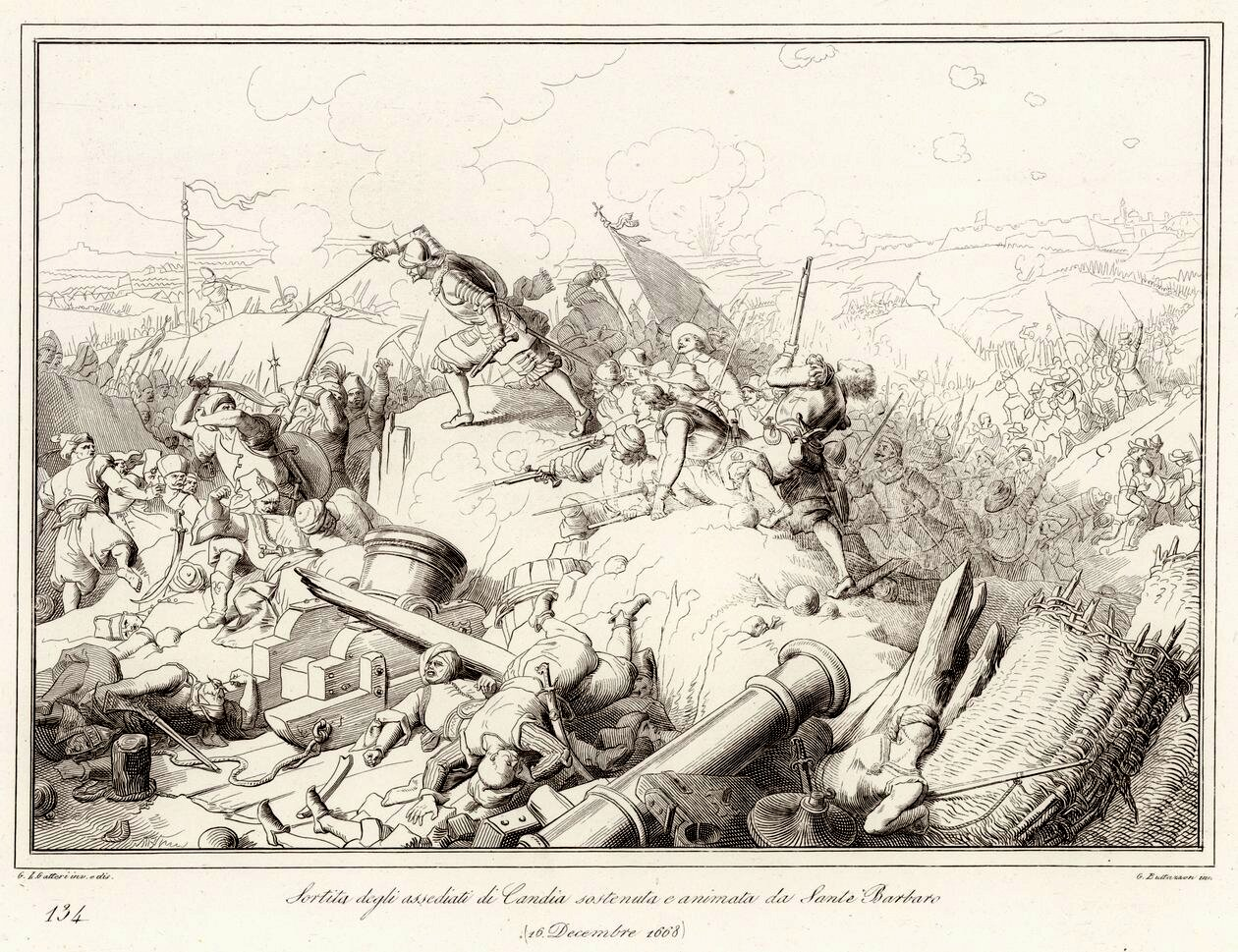
A Venetian sortie during the Siege of Candia (1668)

A sortie (from the French word meaning exit, from Latin root surgere meaning to "rise up") is a deployment or dispatch of one military unit, be it an aircraft, ship, or troops, from a strongpoint. The term originated in siege warfare.

== In siege warfare ==
In siege warfare, the word sortie refers specifically to a sudden sending of troops against the enemy from a defensive position—that is, a counterattack launched against the besiegers by the defenders. If the sortie is through a sally port, the verb to sally may be used interchangeably with to sortie.

Purposes of sorties include harassment of enemy troops, destruction of siege weaponry and engineering works, joining the relief force, etc.

Sir John Thomas Jones, analyzing a number of sieges carried out during the Peninsular War (1807–1814), wrote:

The events of these sieges show that a bold and vigorous sortie in force might carry destruction through every part of a besieger's approaches, where the guard is injudiciously disposed and ill commanded; but that if due precautions have been observed in forming the approaches and posting the defenders, any sortie from a besieged place must be checked with loss in their advance, when the approaches are still distant; or when the approaches are near, should a sortie succeed in pushing into them by a sudden rush, the assailants must inevitably be driven out again in a moment, with terrible slaughter.

== In aviation ==
In military aviation, a sortie is an aircraft flight or mission (training or combat), starting when the aircraft takes off. For example, one mission involving six aircraft would tally six sorties. The sortie rate of a unit is the number of sorties that it can support in a given time.
