= Wallace Benn =

Anglican bishop

The Right Reverend Wallace Benn
- Bishop of Lewes
- Church: Church of England
- Diocese: Chichester
- In office: 1997–2012
- Predecessor: Ian Cundy
- Successor: Richard Jackson

Orders
- Ordination: 1972 (deacon); 1973 (priest)
- Consecration: 1 May 1997 by George Carey

Personal details
- Born: 6 August 1947 (age 79) Bray, County Wicklow, Ireland
- Denomination: Anglican
- Spouse: Lindsay (m. 1978)
- Children: Two
- Education: University College, Dublin; Trinity College, Bristol

Wallace Parke Benn (born 6 August 1947) is a bishop of the Church of England. He was the area Bishop of Lewes in the Diocese of Chichester from May 1997 until his retirement in October 2012.

== Early life and education ==
Benn was born in Bray, County Wicklow, Ireland on 6 August 1947. He was educated at St. Andrew's College, Dublin, then an all-boys school in Dublin. He studied at University College, Dublin, graduating with a Bachelor of Arts (BA) degree in 1969. In 1969, he entered Trinity College, Bristol, an Evangelical Anglican theological college, to train for ordained ministry. During this time he also studied for a diploma in theology (DipTheol) which was validated by the University of London.

== Career ==
=== Ordained ministry ===
Benn was ordained in the Church of England as a deacon in 1972 and as a priest in 1973. His ordained ministry began with curacies at St Mark's New Ferry, Wirral and St Mary's Cheadle, after which he was Vicar of St James the Great, Audley, Staffordshire and finally (before his consecration to the episcopate) St Peter's Harold Wood.

On 1 May 1997, Benn was consecrated a bishop at Southwark Cathedral, by George Carey, Archbishop of Canterbury. He then served as the Bishop of Lewes, an area and suffragan bishop of the Diocese of Chichester. He retired from full-time ministry on 31 October 2012. Since 2013, he has held Permission to Officiate in the Diocese of Peterborough.

=== Author ===
Benn has written three books and numerous pamphlets, including The Last Word: Jesus' Teaching in The Upper Room, Jesus Our Joy: Learning about True Spirituality. and a commentary on Ezra, Nehemiah and Esther in Crossway's 'Preach the Word' series.

=== Independent Inquiry into Child Sexual Abuse ===
The Independent Inquiry into Child Sexual Abuse, undertaken between 2014 and 2022, criticised Benn for his handling of allegations of child sexual abuse during his tenure as Bishop of Lewes.

There was a deep-seated arrogance amongst some senior clergy, including Bishop Wallace Benn. They believed that they were right in their indulgent attitude towards some perpetrators, even when they had been convicted. In Bishop Benn’s case, his failings were compounded by his litigious approach to perceived criticism.

Benn's actions had previously been criticised during several inquiries into sexual abuse scandals in the Diocese of Chichester, relating to child abuse by the Rev Roy Cotton and the Rev Colin Pritchard.

== Views ==
Benn has been described as a complementarian evangelical. He is a council member of Reform, a conservative evangelical grouping in the Church of England opposed to women priests and to the consecration of women as bishops. In 2008, he attended the Global Anglican Future Conference (GAFCON) held in Jerusalem.

He has held leadership roles in a number of conservative evangelical organisations. He was president of Fellowship of Word and Spirit from 1998 to 2018, president of the Church of England Evangelical Council from 2000 to 2014, and president from 2016 to 2018 then vice-president from 2018 to 2020 of the Church Society.

== Personal life ==
In 1978, Benn married Lindsay Develing. Together they have two children: one son and one daughter.

In 2002, Benn appeared on the popular BBC television motoring series Top Gear, placing third in the first "Fastest Faith" competition.

== Styles ==
- Wallace Benn Esq (to 1973)
- The Revd Wallace Benn (1973–1997)
- The Rt Revd Wallace Benn (1997—present)

Church of England titles
Preceded by Ian Cundy	Bishop of Lewes; 1997—2012	Succeeded by Richard Jackson
