= Harry Jones (British Army officer) =

British Army general (1791–1866)

General Sir Harry Jones GCB
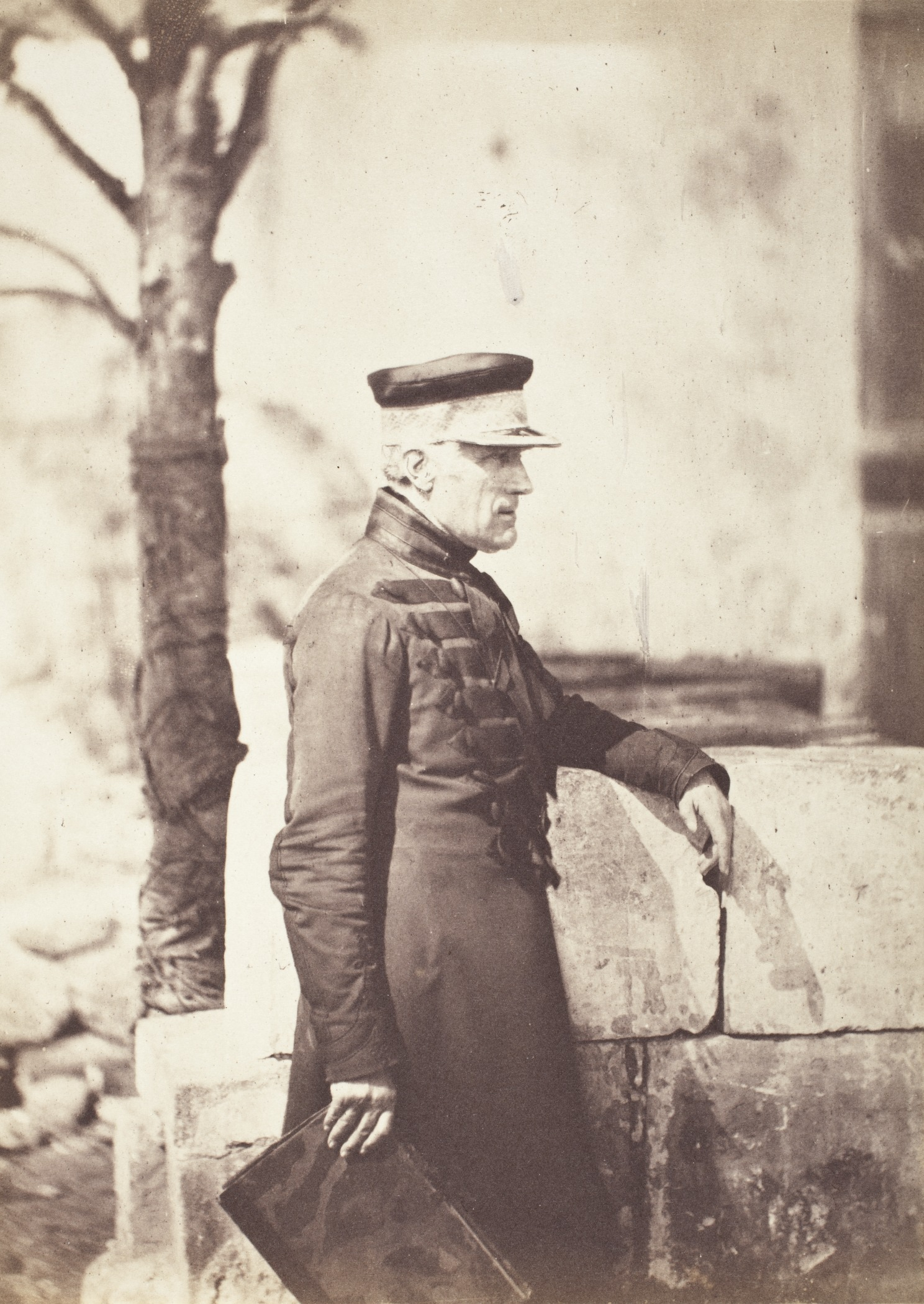
- Born: 14 March 1791; Landguard Fort, Suffolk
- Died: 4 August 1866 (aged 75); Sandhurst, Berkshire
- Burial place: Sandhurst, Berkshire
- Military career
- Allegiance: United Kingdom
- Branch: British Army
- Service years: 1808–1866
- Rank: General
- Commands: Royal Military College, Sandhurst
- Conflicts: Peninsular War; Crimean War
- Awards: Knight Grand Cross of the Order of the Bath

General Sir Henry David Jones GCB (14 March 1791 – 4 August 1866) was a British Army officer who became Governor of the Royal Military College, Sandhurst.

== Life ==
He was the fifth son of John Jones by his wife, Mary, daughter of John Roberts, Esq., of Landguard Fort, an officer 29th Foot, and was brother of Major-General Sir John Thomas Jones, Bart., KCB, and uncle of Sir Willoughby Jones, Bart., of Cranmer Hall, Fakenham, Norfolk.

Educated at the Royal Military Academy, Woolwich, Jones was commissioned into the Royal Engineers in September 1808. In 1809 he was involved in the attack on the fortress at Vlissingen during the Walcheren Campaign. He then took part in the defence of Cádiz in 1809, the Siege of Badajoz in 1812, the Battle of Vitoria in 1813 and the Battle of Nivelle in 1813. He was wounded while leading the forlorn hope during the first assault at the Siege of San Sebastián in September 1813.

In February, 1815, he joined the army under General John Lambert on Dauphin Island, Alabama and was sent to New Orleans on special duty under a return American flag of truce.

On his return to Europe he joined the army in the Netherlands, landing at Ostend on 18 June 1815. He was appointed commanding engineer in charge of the fortifications on Montmartre, after the entrance or the British troops into Paris under the Duke of Wellington. Jones was made a commissioner to the Prussian Army of Occupation in 1816 and went on special service to Constantinople in 1833.

He was appointed Commissioner of Municipal Boundaries in England in 1835, chairman of the board of public works in Ireland in 1845 and director of the Royal Engineer Establishment for Field Instruction at Chatham in 1851.

He served in the Crimean War commanding the British forces at the Battle of Bomarsund and then commanding the Royal Engineer forces at the Siege of Sevastopol. Afterwards he received the Order of the Medjidie, 2nd Class, the Baltic Medal and the Crimea Medal with clasp.

In 1856 he became Governor of the Royal Military College, Sandhurst. He was created an honorary Doctor of Civil Law (DCL) of the University of Oxford, and was honorary Colonel of the 4th Administrative Battalion, Cheshire Rifle Volunteer Corps. In 1859, he was appointed to serve on the Royal Commission on the Defence of the United Kingdom, whose recommendations prompted a huge programme of fortification for the British naval dockyards.

He died after "an illness of some duration" on 4 August 1866 and is buried in the cemetery at the Royal Military Academy Sandhurst.

== Cricket career ==
Jones was associated with Middlesex and was recorded in one match in 1826, totalling 7 runs with a highest score of 6 and holding one catch.

== Family ==
In 1824 Jones married Charlotte, daughter of the Reverend Thomas Hornsby, Vicar of Ravensthorpe, Peterborough and Rector of Hoddesdon, by whom he had six sons and five daughters. His eldest son, Harry Valette Jones, died in 1863; his second son, Captain Arthur Jones, 2nd West India Regiment, died on the coast of Africa in 1861; and his fourth son, Montagu Hornsby Jones, Esq., an ensign of the 84th Regiment of Foot, died in 1859.

== Legacy ==
The Memorials to Governors in the Chapel of the Royal Military Academy, Sandhurst includes: In Memory of Lieut.-General Sir Harry D. Jones, G.C.B., Royal Engineers, who died as Governor of these Royal Military Colleges on the 22nd August 1866. This Tablet was erected by his brother officers in admiration of his character and distinguished services.

Military offices
Preceded by Sir George Scovell	Governor of the Royal Military College, Sandhurst; 1856–1866	Succeeded by Sir George Wetherall
