= Bale, Norfolk =

Village in Norfolk, England

Coordinates: 52.890°N 0.988°E

Bale
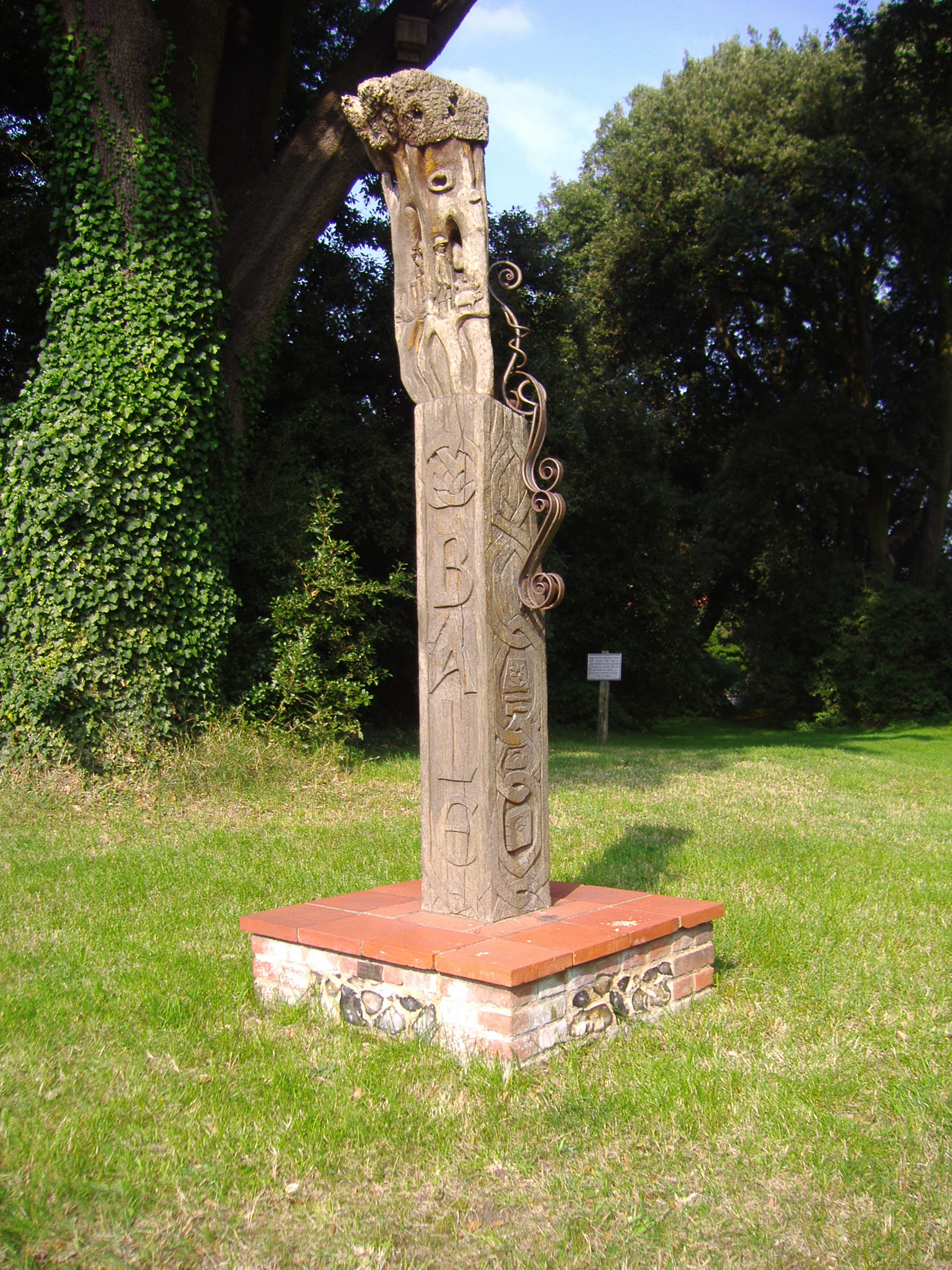
- The village sign in Bale

- Location within Norfolk
- OS grid reference: TG008363
  - London: 123 miles (198 km)
- Civil parish: Gunthorpe
- District: North Norfolk
- Shire county: Norfolk
- Region: East
- Country: England
- Sovereign state: United Kingdom
- Post town: FAKENHAM
- Postcode district: NR21
- Dialling code: 01328
- Police: Norfolk
- Fire: Norfolk
- Ambulance: East of England
- UK Parliament: North Norfolk

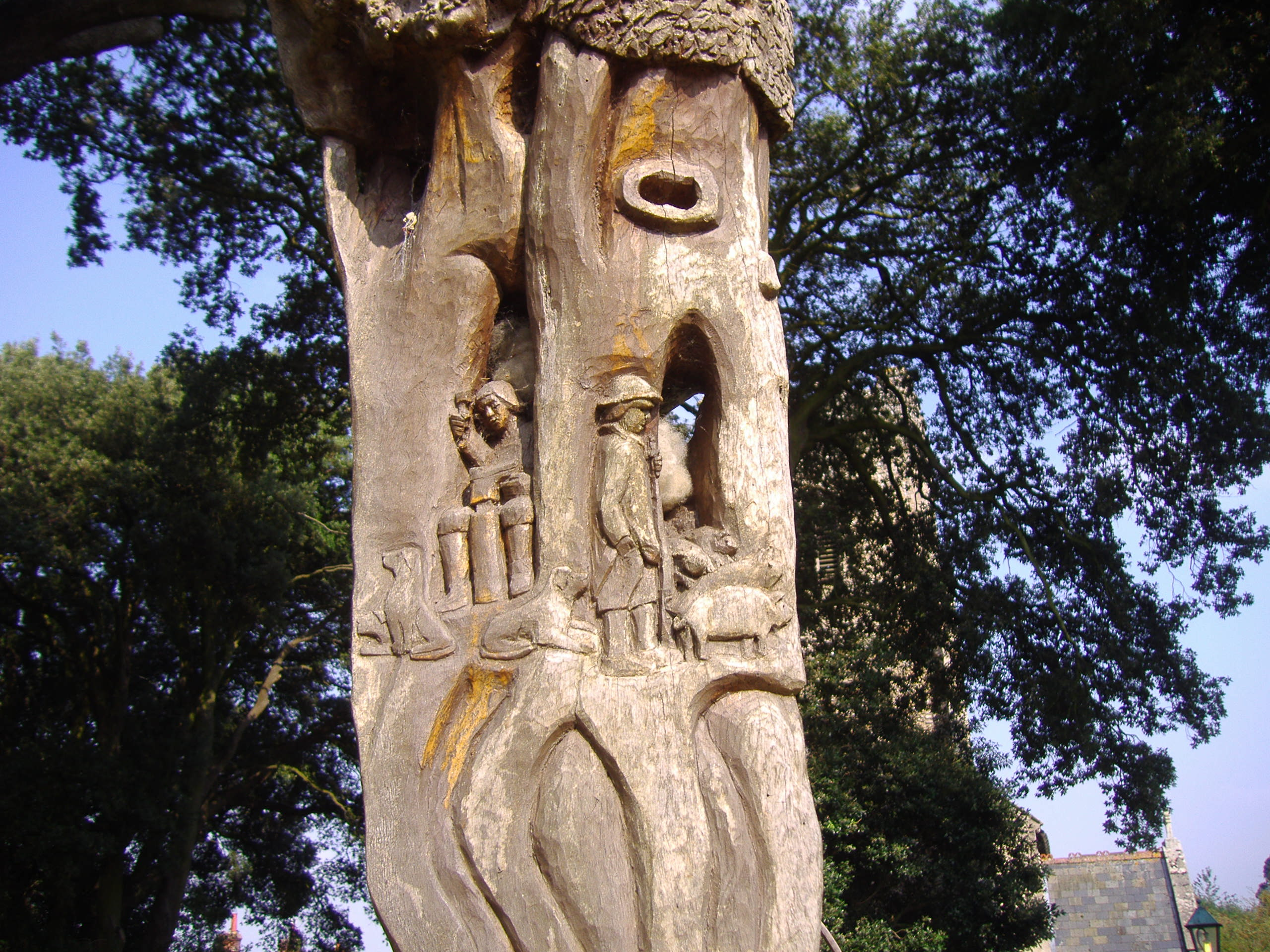
The top of the village sign depicts the Bale Oak

Bale is a village and former civil parish, now in the parish of Gunthorpe, in the North Norfolk district, in the county of Norfolk, England. The village is 9 miles (14 km) east-north-east of the town of Fakenham, 14.3 miles (23.0 km) west-south-west of Cromer and 125 miles (201 km) north-north-east of London. In 1931, the parish had a population of 208.

== History ==
Bale has an entry in the Domesday Book of 1085. In the great book, Bale is recorded by the name Bathele and it is said to be in the ownership of the King. The main tenant was Harold, holding his land from Count Alan.

The village's name means 'Bathing wood/clearing'.

On 1 April 1935, the parish was abolished and merged with Gunthorpe.

== Transport ==
The village lies on the north side of the A148 road, which connects King's Lynn and Cromer. The nearest railway station is at Sheringham, which is the northern terminus of the Bittern Line. Greater Anglia operates services to Cromer and Norwich. The nearest airport is Norwich International Airport, in Hellesdon.

== Church of All Saints ==
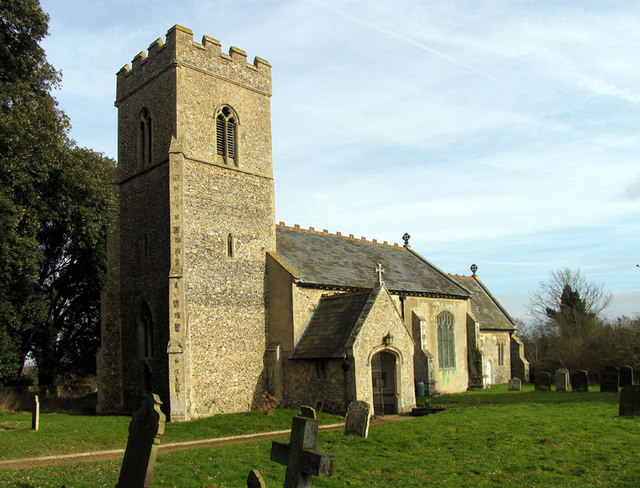
The parish church of All Saints

The parish church is dedicated to All Saints and dates to the middle of the 14th century. The chancel is slightly older and there is a north transept which indicates that another was planned but never built. The windows have impressive tracery around them. The church has a collection of Norwich School stained glass in one of the south nave windows.

== The Bale Oak ==
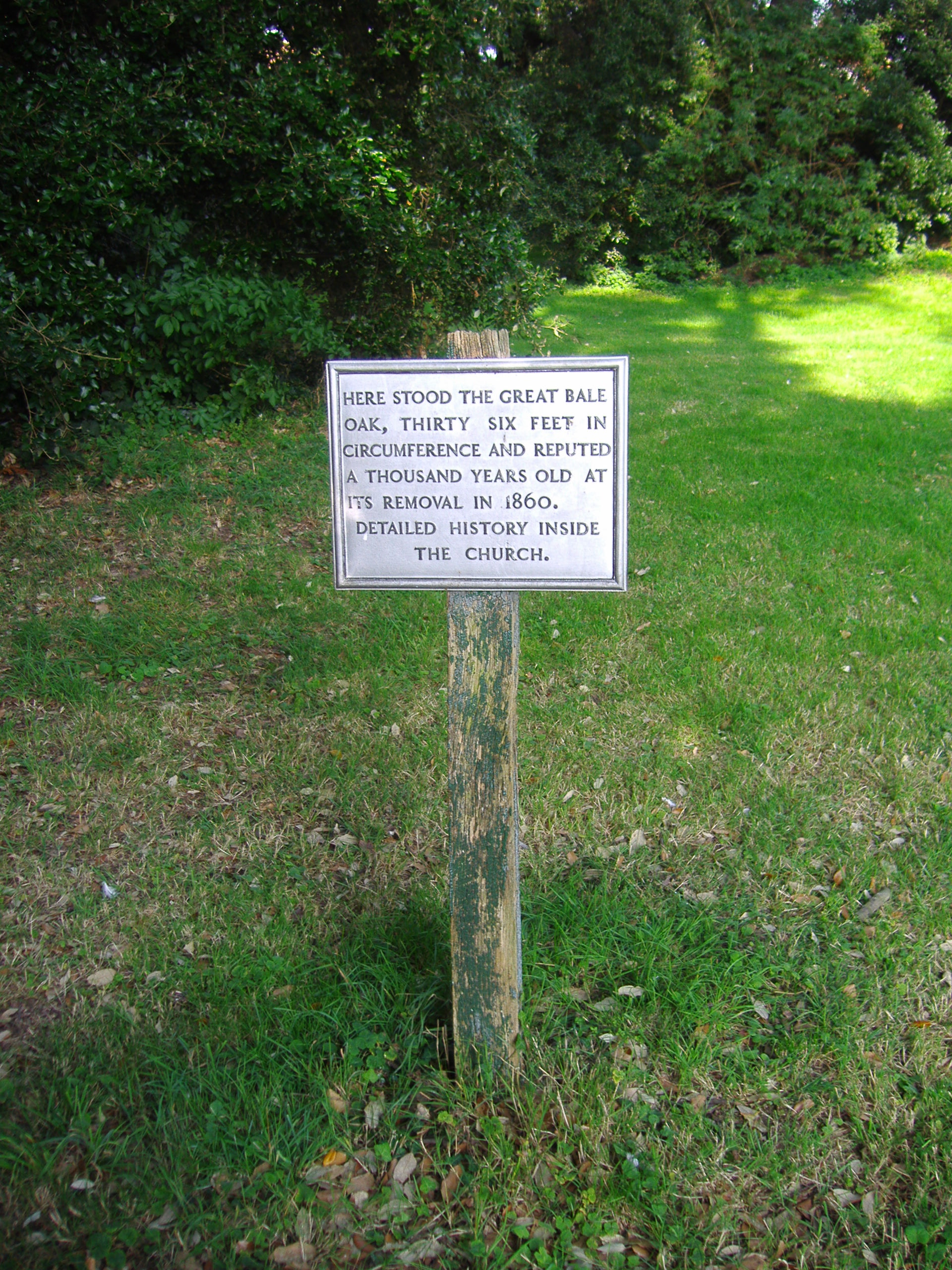
Site of the Bale Oak tree

The Bale Oak was a large oak tree which once stood in the village. The tree measured 36 feet (11 m) in circumference, was over 500 years old and, reportedly, had branches over 70 feet (21 m) long.

In the middle of the 14th century, All Saints church was erected immediately east of the site of the tree. According to folk legend, the tree had previously been a site for pre-Christian worship and may have been a part of a larger grove. In 1795, the oak was severely damaged. It was heavily pollarded and the removed bark and some of the wood was sold to the Hardys of Letheringsett for tanning. Norfolk historian Francis Blomefield recorded use of the oak in the 18th century:

A great oak at bathele near the church, its hollow so large that ten or twelve men may stand within it and a cobbler had his shop and lodge there of late and it is or was used for a swinestry.

Deemed dangerous by the local populace, the Lord of the Manor Sir Willoughby Jones ordered the tree removed in 1860. The site is now covered by a grove of holm oak trees and is protected by the National Trust.
