= The Cube Made Interesting =

Geometry book published in 1960

- Author: Aniela Ehrenfeucht
- Translator: Wacław Zawadowski
- Language: Polish
- Genre: Mathematics
- Publisher: Polish Scientific Publishers PWN
- Publication date: 1960

The Cube Made Interesting is a geometry book aimed at high school mathematics students, on the geometry of the cube. It was originally written in Polish by Aniela Ehrenfeucht (née Miklaszewska, 1905–2000), titled Ciekawy Sześcian ("The Interesting Cube"), and published by Polish Scientific Publishers PWN in 1960. Wacław Zawadowski translated it into English, and the translation was published in 1964 by the Pergamon Press and Macmillan Inc., in their "Popular Lectures in Mathematics" series.

== Topics ==
The book begins with Euler's polyhedral formula, and includes material on the symmetries of their cube and their realization as geometric rotations, and on the shape of plane sections through cubes. It describes the 30 combinatorially distinct colorings of the six faces of the cube by six different colors, and discusses arrangements of colored cubes that match pairs of equal-colored faces. The final chapter of the book concerns Prince Rupert's cube, the problem of fitting a cube through a hole drilled through a smaller cube without breaking the smaller cube into pieces.

An unusual feature of the book is its heavy illustration with red-blue anaglyphs; provided with the book are red-blue glasses allowing readers to see these images as three-dimensional shapes.

== Audience and reception ==
This book is based on talks given by Ehrenfeucht to students and teachers, and is aimed at a secondary-school audience. Reviewer A. A. Kosinski writes that it "would contribute profitably to the development of the geometric imagination of a student", and Martyn Cundy writes that "the claim of the title is certainly justified".

However, H. S. M. Coxeter notes that some of the terminology has become incorrect or nonstandard in the translation, suggesting that copyediting by someone more familiar with English mathematical terminology would have helped avoid these problems. Cundy complains that the material on Prince Rupert's cube does not provide its optimal solution, and suggests that the color printing and inclusion of 3D viewing glasses made it unnecessarily expensive.
