= John Hazlewood =

Australian bishop

John Hazlewood SSC (19 May 1924 – 4 September 1998) was an Australian Anglican bishop. He was the seventh Bishop of Ballarat from 1975 to 1993.

== Life and ministry ==
Hazlewood was born in London and grew up in New Zealand. He was educated at Nelson College from 1938 to 1942 and then served in the Royal Air Force during World War II.

After the war he studied theology at King's College, Cambridge, and trained for the priesthood at Cuddesdon College. He was ordained deacon in 1949 and priest in 1950. He was a curate at St Michael and All Angels, Camberwell (1949–50), followed by two curacies in Australia: Randwick (1950–51) and Dubbo (1951–53). He then returned to London and to St Michael and All Angels in Camberwell (1953–54), after which he was vice-principal of St Francis College, Brisbane and also a lecturer in ecclesiastical history at the University of Queensland. Later he was dean of St Paul's Cathedral, Rockhampton (1960–68), and then the Dean of Perth before his ordination to the episcopate on 29 September 1975 at St Paul's Cathedral, Melbourne, to serve as Bishop of Ballarat. During his time as bishop, Hazlewood openly opposed the ordination of women, stating at the Ballarat Synod in 1986, "Just as I cannot give birth to a child so this Church cannot grant holy orders to the female sex". He retired from that position in 1993.

As Dean of Perth, Hazlewood organised the Rock Mass for Love with rock group Bakery, which was recorded live at St George's Cathedral, Perth, on 21 March 1971.

His nephew, Will Hazlewood, is Bishop of Lewes.
