= Chetton =

Village and civil parish in Shropshire, England

Coordinates: 52.510°N 2.495°W

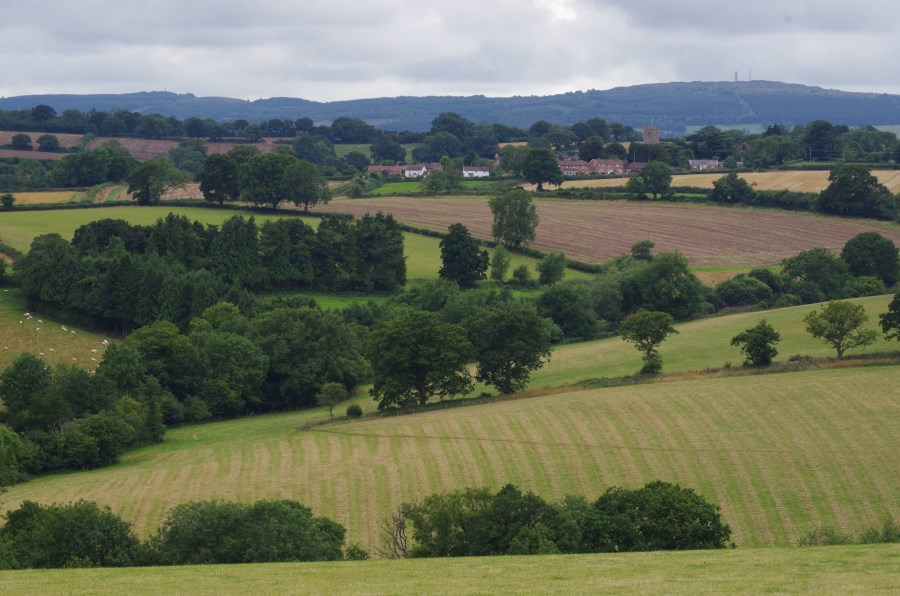
- Chetton from Jack Myton Way

- Location within Shropshire
- Population: 349
- OS grid reference: SO664903
- Civil parish: Chetton
- Unitary authority: Shropshire
- Ceremonial county: Shropshire
- Region: West Midlands
- Country: England
- Sovereign state: United Kingdom
- Post town: Bridgnorth
- Postcode district: WV16
- Dialling code: 01746
- Police: West Mercia
- Fire: Shropshire
- Ambulance: West Midlands
- UK Parliament: Ludlow
- Website: chetton-pc.org.uk

Chetton is a small village and civil parish in Shropshire, England. According to the 2011 census the parish had a population of 349. It is about 20 miles (32 km) to the West of Wolverhampton in West Midlands and South of Telford.

The village stands on a spur of Brown Clee Hill.

== Demographics ==
=== Population ===
Since the 1800s there has been regular data collected regarding the parishes's population. The total population has fluctuated over the years but has actually decreased by 23% over the last 200 years. However, the population has not always decreased. Records show that between 1801 and 1841 the population increased by 46%. In addition to this, in 1911 there was a sudden increase of 9%. Chetton's population does not follow suit of the English population; between 1801 and 1961 the total population of England had steadily increased by 460%. It is not unusual for small civil parishes such as Chetton to have dwindling populations. Many young people living in such areas find it hard to gain employment and social events for the younger generations are limited resulting in many migrating in search of better opportunities in the city.

As the population of England and Wales has increased, so has the population density. Between 1800 and 1960 the population density of England and Wales increased dramatically. In contrast to this Chetton's population density has not fluctuated at all, if anything it has very slightly decreased.

The most recent Census data available for Chetton is the 2011 census and according to this census the parish had a total of 349 people. At the previous census in 2001 this had decreased since 1911 to 304 and the first census data in 1801 where the population was 396. This had been a total decrease of 23% since 1801, which for such a small parish is a considerable amount of decrease compared to other towns and villages in Shropshire; however in the ten years to 2011 the population has started to increase again. At the time of the 2011 census, the total headcount for Chetton was 349, 185 of these were males and 164 were females, with a total of 133 households.

=== Population Density (Per Acre) ===
Since the data from the 1881 census was published the population density of Chetton has steadily increased ever since. Compared to the population density of England and Wales which has stayed the same and slightly decreased around the 1900 but then increased soon after. The density changes a lot from one census to another but that was also down to the change of map boundaries.

=== Occupation Structure ===
Even when the first census was produced it categorised into three categories, 'chiefly employed in agriculture', those 'chiefly employed in trade, manufacturers or handicraft', and 'others'. However, as time went on the censuses became more detailed, data was collected on people's occupations and were then used in the 1841 census whereby there were over 3,000 different occupational titles. This was not practical but at the time there was no advice on how to organise the job titles as they did not expect the vast number of job titles that were given. The 1881 census shows that Chetton was an agricultural parish but it was mainly males working in this sector as it also shows that the majority of the women were unemployed. Some women were employed but it was not in a manual profession, they were employed in a domestic service role or in an office.

== Housing ==
Census data has enabled us to have an insight to the way Chetton used to be. In 1831 the census began to gather more personal information about people's properties, the number of rooms, the number of people living there etc., but the statistical data gathered was the number of people occupying the house and the number of rooms. We are able to use this data and see that there were 123 houses of which 199 of these were occupied. Every census since has asked similar questions. The number of houses in Chetton has fluctuated over the last 200 years but in 1961 the total number of houses had decreased to 180, however, all of these were occupied. Between 1921 and 1961 the number of rooms in Chetton had increased by 3 despite the decrease in houses

The types of houses in Chetton are a mixture of terraced houses, farm houses and detached houses. Many of these houses used to be owned by farmers who used to make their living out of agriculture, whether it would be growing and selling crops such as wheat, oats and grain or farming cattle, sheep or chickens. Chetton was very much an agricultural parish.

== Transport ==
=== Road ===
Chetton is accessible by various country lanes but all these roads connect to the B4364 and the B4368. These join the A458 which joins Chetton to the nearest town, Bridgnorth.

=== Train ===
There are no railway stations in the parish itself. The two nearest working stations are at Shifnal around 12 miles away and Telford Central, also 12 miles away.

== Parish church ==
The parish church of St Giles was reputedly founded by Lady Godiva when her husband, Leofric, Earl of Mercia, was lord of Chetton manor, but its earliest visible parts are 13th century. It has a fine set of church bells. The churchyard contains one war grave, of a Kings Shropshire Light Infantry soldier of World War I.

Henry Southwell (1860-1937), later Bishop of Lewes, was Rector of Chetton from 1892 to 1895.

== Flag proposals ==
=== Early development ===
Due to local nationalism a group of young people decided to start designing and developing a local flag for the parish of Chetton.

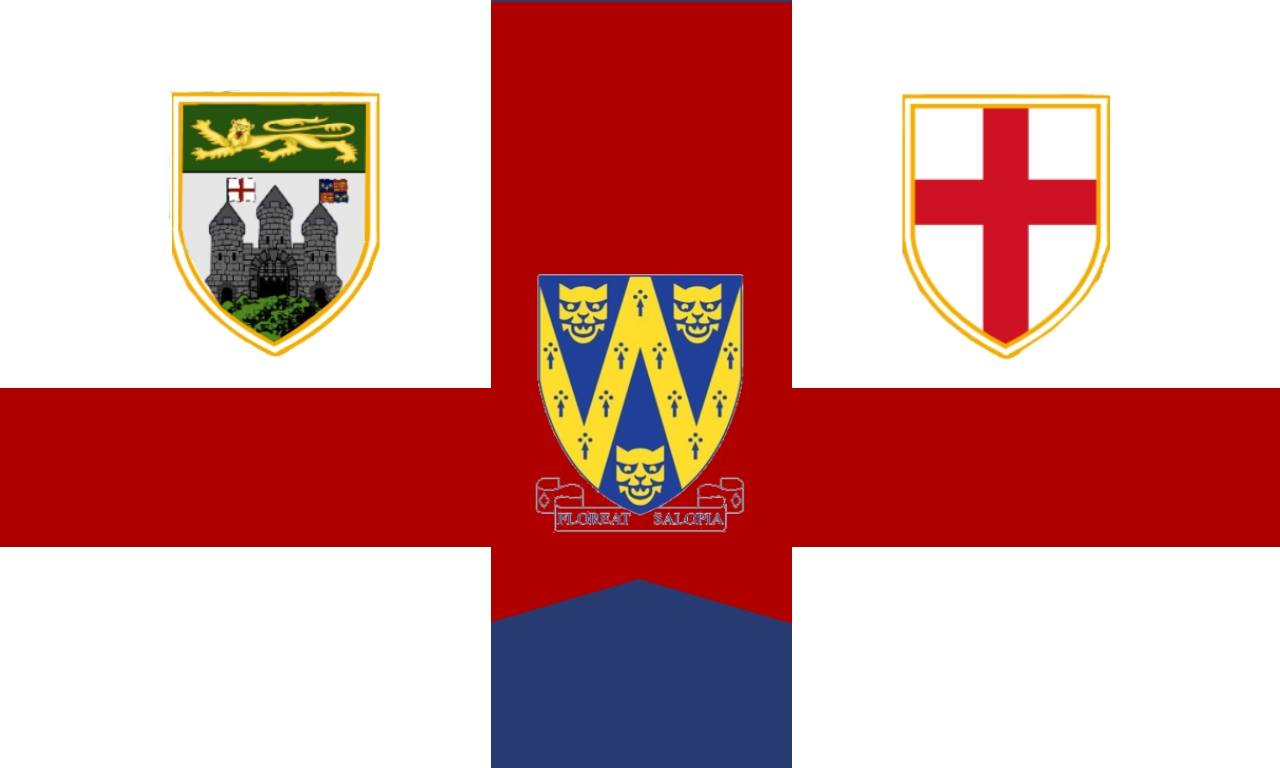
An early development of the parish flag

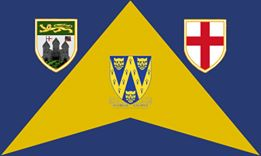
An early development of the parish flag

== See also ==
- Listed buildings in Chetton
