= Mathematical Models (Fischer) =

Book on objects used to teach mathematics

Mathematical Models: From the Collections of Universities and Museums – Photograph Volume and Commentary
- 1986 editions
- Editor: Gerd Fischer
- Genre: Mathematics
- Publisher: Vieweg+Teubner Verlag
- Publication date: 1986

Mathematical Models: From the Collections of Universities and Museums – Photograph Volume and Commentary is a book on the physical models of concepts in mathematics that were constructed in the 19th century and early 20th century and kept as instructional aids at universities. It credits Gerd Fischer as editor, but its photographs of models are also by Fischer. It was originally published by Vieweg+Teubner Verlag for their bicentennial in 1986, both in German (titled Mathematische Modelle. Aus den Sammlungen von Universitäten und Museen. Mit 132 Fotografien. Bildband und Kommentarband) and (separately) in English translation, in each case as a two-volume set with one volume of photographs and a second volume of mathematical commentary. Springer Spektrum reprinted it in a second edition in 2017, as a single dual-language volume.

== Topics ==
The work consists of 132 full-page photographs of mathematical models, divided into seven categories, and seven chapters of mathematical commentary written by experts in the topic area of each category.

These categories are:

- Wire and thread models, of hypercubes of various dimensions, and of hyperboloids, cylinders, and related ruled surfaces, described as "elementary analytic geometry" and explained by Fischer himself.
- Plaster and wood models of cubic and quartic algebraic surfaces, including Cayley's ruled cubic surface, the Clebsch surface, Fresnel's wave surface, the Kummer surface, and the Roman surface, with commentary by W. Barth and H. Knörrer.
- Wire and plaster models illustrating the differential geometry and curvature of curves and surfaces, including surfaces of revolution, Dupin cyclides, helicoids, and minimal surfaces including the Enneper surface, with commentary by M. P. do Carmo, G. Fischer, U. Pinkall, H. and Reckziegel.
- Surfaces of constant width including the surface of rotation of the Reuleaux triangle and the Meissner bodies, described by J. Böhm.
- Uniform star polyhedra, described by E. Quaisser.
- Models of the projective plane, including the Roman surface (again), the cross-cap, and Boy's surface, with commentary by U. Pinkall that includes its realization by Roger Apéry as a quartic surface (disproving a conjecture of Heinz Hopf).
- Graphs of functions, both with real and complex variables, including the Peano surface, Riemann surfaces, exponential function and Weierstrass's elliptic functions, with commentary by J. Leiterer.

== Audience and reception ==
This book can be viewed as a supplement to Mathematical Models by Martyn Cundy and A. P. Rollett (1950), on instructions for making mathematical models, which according to reviewer Tony Gardiner "should be in every classroom and on every lecturer's shelf" but in fact sold very slowly. Gardiner writes that the photographs may be useful in undergraduate mathematics lectures, while the commentary is best aimed at mathematics professionals in giving them an understanding of what each model depicts. Gardiner also suggests using the book as a source of inspiration for undergraduate research projects that use its models as starting points and build on the mathematics they depict. Although Gardiner finds the commentary at times overly telegraphic and difficult to understand, reviewer O. Giering, writing about the German-language version of the same commentary, calls it detailed, easy-to-read, and stimulating.

By the time of the publication of the second edition, in 2017, reviewer Hans-Peter Schröcker evaluates the visualizations in the book as "anachronistic", superseded by the ability to visualize the same phenomena more easily with modern computer graphics, and he writes that some of the commentary is also "slightly outdated". Nevertheless, he writes that the photos are "beautiful and aesthetically pleasing", writing approvingly that they use color sparingly and aim to let the models speak for themselves rather than dazzling with many color images. And despite the fading strength of its original purpose, he finds the book valuable both for its historical interest and for what it still has to say about visualizing mathematics in a way that is both beautiful and informative.
