= George Matthew Jones =

British Royal Navy captain

Captain George Matthew Jones
- Born: 1785?
- Died: April 1831; Malta
- Occupation: Royal Navy captain

George Matthew Jones (1785? – April 1831) was a British Royal Navy captain and traveller.

== Biography ==
Jones brother of General Sir John Thomas Jones, bart.

In April 1802, he was promoted to be a lieutenant in the navy. He was appointed to the Amphion, in which, in the following spring, Lord Nelson went out to the Mediterranean, and which, on 5 October 1804, assisted in the capture of the Spanish treasure-ships off Cape St. Mary. In September 1805, Captain Hoste was appointed to the Amphion, and Jones, continuing with him, took part in the peculiarly active service in the Adriatic, distinguishing himself in several of the boat engagements, and being severely wounded on 8 November 1808.

On 13 December 1810, he was promoted to command the Tuscan brig, in which, during the next year, he assisted in the defence of Cadiz. In 1817 he commanded the Pandora on the coast of Ireland, and was posted on 7 Dec. 1818. The following years he spent in travelling over Europe with the object of examining the maritime resources of the different countries. He was already well acquainted with the coasts of Spain and Italy; he now visited the ports and arsenals of France and Holland, of the Black Sea, and of the Baltic.

In 1827, he published his journals, under the title of ‘Travels in Norway, Sweden, Finland, Russia, and Turkey; also on the Coasts of the Sea of Azof and of the Black Sea, &c.,’ 2 vols. 8vo. The work, which he dedicated to Sir William Hoste, by whose advice the travels seem to have been undertaken and the journals kept, is written intelligently, though at excessive length. After its publication Jones's health broke down. He died at Malta in April 1831.
