= Bryan Thwaites =

English mathematician and academic (born 1923)

Sir Bryan Thwaites
- Born: 6 December 1923 (age 102)
- Education: Cambridge University
- Known for: Thwaites Flap; Thwaites Method; School Mathematics Project (SMP)
- Scientific career
- Fields: Mathematics
- Workplaces: University of Southampton; Westfield College, London University

Sir Bryan Thwaites, FIMA, FRSA (born 6 December 1923) is an English applied mathematician, educationalist and administrator.

== Early life ==
Bryan Thwaites was born on 6 December 1923, the eldest son of Ernest and Dorothy Thwaites. He was educated at Dulwich College, from 1936 to 1940, and, thereafter, at Winchester College, aided in both colleges by scholarships. He graduated with an MA from Clare College, Cambridge, in 1944, gaining a First in the Maths Tripos. He received his doctorate (Ph.D.) from London University.

== Career ==
=== Early career ===
Thwaites' first appointment, on graduation, was as a Science Officer at the National Physical Laboratory (NPL), Teddington (1944–1947).

He then moved to the Department of Aeronautics at the Imperial College of Science (1947–1951), where he made an early impression: his Thwaites Flap being used to assist aeronautical tests.

=== Schoolmaster ===
In 1951 he returned to his old school, Winchester College, as an Assistant Master, teaching mathematics (1951–1959) and remained in secondary education for most of the 1950s. He was also commissioned as a pilot officer in the Royal Air Force Volunteer Reserve (Training Branch) (RAFVR(T)) from 1952 to 1958. This was largely to assist with the command of the College's combined cadet force. Thwaites resigned his commission in 1958, as he prepared to take up his new appointments.

=== Professor ===
In 1961 Thwaites was appointed Professor of Theoretical Mechanics at the new University of Southampton (1961–1965).

On taking up his new post, Thwaites hosted a conference addressing the disconnect between the teaching of mathematics and the need for professional mathematicians in industry and academia: the result was the School Mathematics Project (SMP). At a meeting in Winchester, three public-school maths. teachers met with Thwaites to devise a new curriculum: Martyn Cundy (1913–2005) Sherborne School, Tom Jones Winchester College and Douglas Quadling (OBE) Marlborough College. T. D. Morris of Charterhouse School joined the group soon after. The representatives of Charterhouse, Marlborough, Sherborne and Winchester were then joined by Battersea Grammar School (A. J. Penfold), Exeter School (D. J. Holding), Holloway School (D. E. Mansfield) and Winchester County High School for Girls (WCHS) (J. E. Harris) and these eight schools initiated the SMP. Within a year the team had drawn up materials for the "modern mathematics", ready for the new academic year in September 1962. From July 1964 three examination boards offered the new syllabus for the G.C.E. The SMP began as a research project but was then formalised as a charitable trust: Thwaites was the founding Director.

Taking another approach to further the development of mathematics, Thwaites co-founded, in 1964, the Institute of Mathematics and its Applications (IMA), alongside James Lighthill; he became a Fellow (FIMA) of the institute. In 1990, IMA received its Charter and was therefore able to award the title of Chartered Mathematician (CMath) to practising mathematicians, as part of the professionalisation of the occupation.

=== Principal ===
In 1965, Thwaites was appointed Principal of Westfield College [1965–1984], a newly co-educational college of London University, based in Hampstead. He held the post for seventeen years, retiring from the post shortly before the college merged with Queen Mary College. In 1969, he was also appointed the Professor of Geometry [1969–1972] at Gresham College.

=== Administrator ===
Thwaites developed an interest in medical administration, accepting a number of appointments over the years: he was Chairman of the Northwick Park Hospital Management Committee and a member of the Council of the Middlesex Hospital Board.

From 1982 to 1988, Thwaites was Chairman of Wessex Regional Health Authority. A 1993 report revealed that in 1986, Thwaites came under pressure to award a contract to Arthur Andersen. Patrick Jenkin was registered as a lobbyist for Andersen, and had been the man who appointed Thwaites to the post, when Jenkin was Secretary of State. Nevertheless, Thwaites was knighted in the New Year's Honours list of 1986, for his services to education and medicine. Jenkin was awarded a peerage in 1987. The friendship was briefly cemented by the marriage — later dissolved — in 1990, of Thwaites' son to Jenkin's daughter.

=== Philanthropy ===
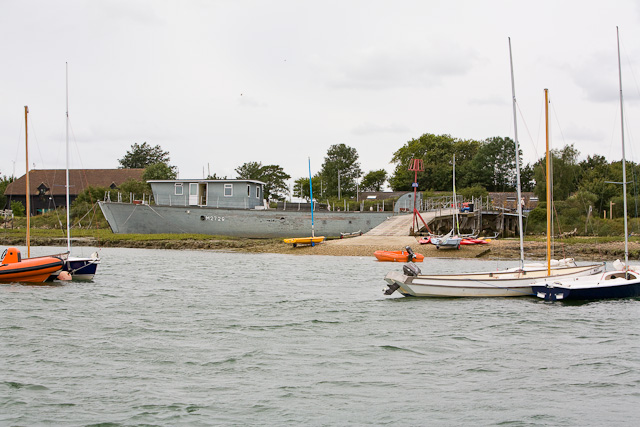
Christian Youth Enterprises Sailing Centre in 2009

In 2007, Thwaites donated an organ built for his London apartment to his old school Dulwich College. In 2019, he attempted to leave a bequest, totalling £1.2 million, to his two secondary schools, on condition that it was used to benefit "white working-class poor (males)". The schools, Winchester and Dulwich Colleges, both turned down the offer on the basis that it was discriminatory. A number of State Schools expressed interest in receiving the bequest instead, but Thwaited did not pursue the matter.

In 2022 Thwaites made a donation of over £1.2 million towards the provision of an updated core facilities block at the Christian Youth Enterprises Sailing Centre (CYE) based since 1985 on he Cobnor Estate, within Chichester Harbour. The resulting ~£2m new build, termed 'Project Delta' during its development, was completed in October 2023, and renamed "Thwaites House" upon opening.

== Personal life ==
Bryan Thwaites married Katharine Mary (Kate) in 1948; Lady Thwaites died in 1991. They have six children. As a widower, Sir Bryan owned an apartment in the Albany, Piccadilly for a number of years.

In 2000, Thwaites was prosecuted in relation to the hit-and-run death of an 83-year-old pedestrian, in Winchester. He denied all three charges of careless driving, failing to stop after an accident and failing to report it to police, and was found not guilty.

== Publications ==
- Thwaites, B. (1960). Incompressible Aerodynamics. Oxford: Clarendon Press. ISBN 978-1114641235.
- Thwaites, B. (1984). Education 2000. Cambridge: Cambridge University Press. ISBN 978-0521278218.
