= Will Hazlewood =

British Anglican bishop (born 1971)

The Right Reverend William Hazlewood SSC
- Bishop of Lewes
- Church: Church of England
- Province: Canterbury
- Diocese: Chichester
- Predecessor: Richard Jackson
- Other posts: Vicar of Dartmouth and Dittisham

Orders
- Ordination: 2 July 2001 (deacon); 1 July 2002 (priest) by Andrew Burnham
- Consecration: 15 July 2020 by Norman Banks

Personal details
- Born: 1971 (age 54–55)
- Denomination: Anglican

William Peter Guy Hazlewood SSC (born 1971) is a British Anglican bishop who has been the Bishop of Lewes since 2020. From 2011, he was vicar of Dartmouth and Dittisham in the Diocese of Exeter.

== Early life and education ==
Hazlewood was born in 1971. His father was the Reverend Canon Ian Hazlewood who was also a traditionalist Catholic priest of the Church of England. His father's brother, John Hazlewood, was the Bishop of Ballarat in Australia. Hazlewood's brother is Charles Hazlewood, a conductor.

Hazlewood was educated at Wynstones School, a private Steiner school in Gloucestershire. Then, from 1989 to 1991, he was an apprentice motor mechanic. He studied at De Montfort University, graduating with a Bachelor of Arts degree in 1997. He went on to train for holy orders at St Stephen's House, Oxford, completing a Bachelor of Theology degree in 2001.

== Ordained ministry ==
Hazlewood was ordained in the Church of England as a deacon in 2001 and as a priest in 2002. He served his curacy at Holy Nativity Knowle and All Hallows Easton, churches in the Diocese of Bristol.

He is a guardian of the Anglican Shrine of Our Lady of Walsingham. A traditionalist Anglo-Catholic, he rejects the ordination of women to the priesthood and episcopate.

=== Episcopal ministry ===
In April 2020, he was announced as the next Bishop of Lewes, a suffragan bishop in the Diocese of Chichester. He was consecrated a bishop on 15 July 2020 at Lambeth Palace Chapel by Norman Banks, Bishop of Richborough, on behalf of the Archbishop of Canterbury. Jonathan Goodall, Bishop of Ebbsfleet, and Jonathan Baker, Bishop of Fulham, served as co-consecrators.

Hazlewood is a member of the Council of Bishops of The Society, an association of traditionalist Anglo-Catholics in the Church of England who reject the ordination of women as priests and bishops.

In May 2026, with the retirement of Martin Warner, Hazelwood became acting Bishop of Chichester.

== Personal life ==
In 1999, Hazlewood married Sophie. They have one son and one daughter.
