= Listed buildings in Chetton =

Chetton is a civil parish in Shropshire, England. It contains 13 listed buildings that are recorded in the National Heritage List for England. Of these, two are listed at Grade II*, the middle of the three grades, and the others are at Grade II, the lowest grade. Apart from the small village of Chetton, the parish is entirely rural. Other than a church, all the listed buildings are houses, farmhouses, and farm buildings.

== Key ==
Grade	Criteria
II*	Particularly important buildings of more than special interest
II	Buildings of national importance and special interest

== Buildings ==
Name and location	Photograph	Date	Notes	Grade
St Giles' Church; 52.51015°N 2.49665°W		13th century	The oldest part of the church is the chancel which is in Early English style. The nave was rebuilt in 1788 in Decorated style, and was restored in 1891–92, and the tower was built in 1828–30. The church is built in sandstone with freestone dressings and quoins, and the roof is tiled. It consists of a nave, a south porch, a lower chancel, a north vestry and organ chamber, and a west tower. The tower has three stages, a two-light west window, a corbel table, and an embattled parapet with corner pinnacles.	II*
Eudon George; 52.49740°N 2.46131°W	—	Late Medieval	A timber framed farmhouse with brick nogging, in two parts. The older part is a hall range with 1½ storeys, the later part to the west is dated 1618, and has two full storeys and gables. The upper storey is jettied, and has a moulded bressumer. There is a porch with a moulded doorway, and the windows are mullioned and transomed, and contain casements.	II*
Bush Farm House; 52.51090°N 2.49850°W	—	16th century	The farmhouse was later extended; it is partly in stone and partly in brick, and has a tile roof. The central range has one storey and an attic, and it is flanked by two-storey projecting gabled wings. The windows are casements.	II
Eudon Burnell; 52.50078°N 2.44343°W	—	16th century	The farmhouse was later extended; it is partly timber framed and partly in stone, and has tile roofs. There are two storeys, and part also has an attic. The windows are casements. The northern gable has ornamental bargeboards, and there is another gable with a finial.	II
Old House, Criddon; 52.51706°N 2.49840°W		17th century	The former house has since been used for other purposes. It is partly timber framed, and partly in brick, and has an asbestos roof. There are two storeys, and the windows are casements.	II
Barn and stable range, Faintree Hall Farm; 52.49771°N 2.49906°W	—	17th century	The oldest part is the barn, which is timber framed and weatherboarded, it has seven bays and two storeys. Two 18th-century stable ranges extend to the rear, giving a U-shaped plan; the left range has a stone lower storey and timber framing above, and the right range is in stone. At the front is an early 19th-century gin gang with brick piers on a stone base. All the buildings have tile roofs.	II
North Eudon; 52.49871°N 2.46241°W	—	17th century	The farmhouse is timber framed, and has extensions in brick. There are two storeys and attics, two gables on the front and a gabled porch between them. The upper storey and attics are slightly jettied, and have moulded bressumers.	II
South Eudon; 52.49731°N 2.46019°W	—	17th century	A timber framed farmhouse with brick nogging, it has two storeys and an L-shaped plan.	II
Upper Hollycott; 52.51149°N 2.46925°W	—	18th century	A house containing earlier material, it is timber framed and plastered, and has a tile roof. There are two storeys, four bays, and two rear wings. The windows are casements.	II
Criddon; 52.51730°N 2.49824°W	—	Late 18th century (probable)	A brick farmhouse with a string course and a hipped tile roof. There are two storeys and three bays, the central bay recessed. The windows are sashes, and there is a wooden trellis porch.	II
Chetton Grange; 52.50636°N 2.47762°W	—	c. 1810	A red brick house with a slate roof, it has two storeys and a front of three bays. On the front is a portico with Doric columns, and a recessed doorway with a moulded surround. To the left is a recessed two storey wing, and beyond that is a single-storey wing and a pergola.	II
Walsbatch Manor; 52.50895°N 2.48404°W	—	1820	A brick house with a slate roof. There is a central block with two storeys, three bays, and two gables, and this is flanked by low single-storey wings. The porch has Doric pillars, and the windows are sashes.	II
Faintree Hall; 52.49811°N 2.49825°W	—	Early 19th century	A red brick house with brick pilasters and a tile roof. There are three storeys and five bays. In the centre is a porch with coupled columns and a pediment.	II
