= Gunthorpe, Norfolk =

Village in Norfolk, England

Coordinates: 52.873°N 0.993°E

Gunthorpe
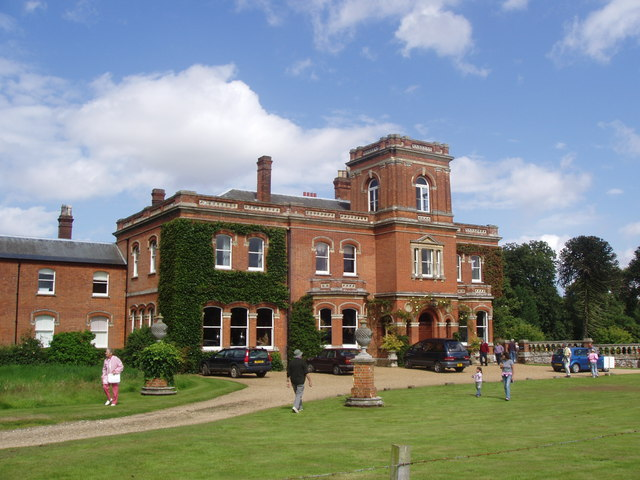
- Gunthorpe Hall

- Location within Norfolk
- Area: 10.03 sq mi (26.0 km^{2})
- Population: 229 (2021 census)
  - Density: 23/sq mi (8.9/km^{2})
- OS grid reference: TG0134
  - London: 122 miles (196 km)
- Civil parish: Gunthorpe
- District: North Norfolk
- Shire county: Norfolk
- Region: East
- Country: England
- Sovereign state: United Kingdom
- Post town: Melton Constable
- Postcode district: NR24
- Dialling code: 01328
- Police: Norfolk
- Fire: Norfolk
- Ambulance: East of England
- UK Parliament: North Norfolk

Gunthorpe is a village and a civil parish in the English county of Norfolk. The civil parish also includes the village of Bale.

Gunthorpe is located 8.6 miles (13.8 km) north east of the town of Fakenham and 21 miles (34 km) north-west of Norwich.

== History ==
Gunthorpe's name is of Viking origin and derives from the Old Norse for Gunni's farmstead.

In the Domesday Book of 1086, Gunthorpe is listed as a settlement of 18 households in the hundred of Holt. In 1086, the village was part of the East Anglian estates of King William I and Peter de Valognes.

Gunthorpe Hall was originally built in 1789 to the design of Sir John Soane, the architect who designed the Bank of England building in Threadneedle Street in 1778, and was renovated in 1880 by William Butterfield. The Hall is a large part Georgian, part Victorian Hall and at one time had forty rooms and a separate stable block and coach house. The hall is a Grade II listed building.

== Geography ==
According to the 2021 census, Gunthorpe has a population of 229 people which shows a decrease from the 244 people recorded in the 2011 census.

The A148, between King's Lynn and Cromer, passes through the civil parish.

== St. Mary's Church ==
Gunthorpe's parish church is dedicated to Saint Mary and dates from the Fourteenth Century. St. Mary's is located outside of the village on Bale Road and has been a Grade II* listed building since 1959. The church remains open for Sunday services twice a month.

St. Mary's was mostly re-built by Frederick Preedy in the 1860s at the instigation of Canon John Henry Sparke of Gunthorpe Hall.

== Notation ==
The Acute Stroke Unit in Norfolk and Norwich University Hospital is named after this village.

== Governance ==
Gunthorpe is divided into two electoral wards of Gunthorpe North & Gunthorpe South for local elections and is part of the district of North Norfolk.

The village's national constituency is North Norfolk, which has been represented by the Liberal Democrat Steff Aquarone MP since 2024.

== War Memorial ==
Gunthorpe War Memorial is a grey granite cross in St. Mary's Churchyard which lists the following names for the First World War:

Rank	Name	Unit	Date of death	Burial/Commemoration
Lt.	Douglas F. F. Shennan	4th Bn., Rifle Brigade	8 May 1915	Menin Gate
2Lt.	Marcus F. Oliphant	5th Bn., Norfolk Regiment	12 Aug. 1915	Helles Memorial
Cpl.	Richard Warnes	7th Bn., Norfolk Regt.	26 Mar. 1916	Vermelles Cemetery
Pte.	George Shearing	1st Bn., Norfolk Regt.	15 May 1917	Orchard Dump Cemetery
Pte.	Arthur Chapman	5th Bn., Norfolk Regt.	21 Aug. 1915	Helles Memorial
Pte.	Charles Bunn	12th Bn., Norfolk Regt.	11 Mar. 1918	Jerusalem War Cemetery
Pte.	George D. Price	1st Bn., Northamptonshire Regiment	18 Nov. 1917	Buffs Road Cemetery
Pte.	Geoffrey W. Stevens	13th Bn., Royal Sussex Regiment	26 Apr. 1918	Tyne Cot
