= Wellington Front =

- Part of Fortifications of Gibraltar
- Line Wall Curtain, Line Wall Road, Gibraltar
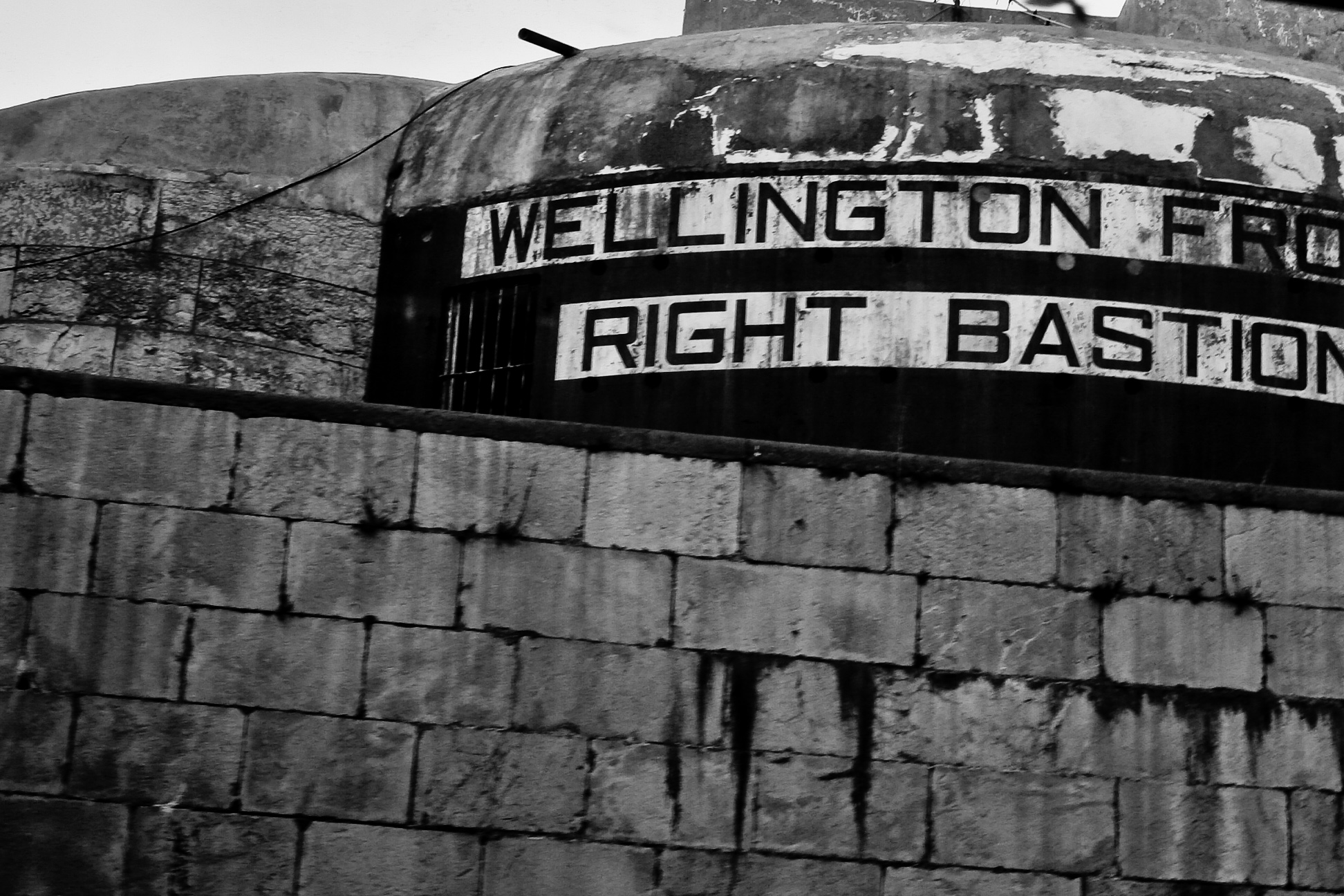
- Wellington Front Right (North) Bastion

Site information
- Type: Demi-bastions, Curtain wall
- Owner: Government of Gibraltar
- Open to the public: Yes
- Condition: Unkept

Location
- Location of Wellington Front within Gibraltar.
- Coordinates: 36.136932°N 5.354516°W

Site history
- Built: 1840
- Built by: Government of the United Kingdom
- Materials: Limestone; Concrete

Wellington Front is a fortification in the British Overseas Territory of Gibraltar. It was built in 1840 on a site established by the Spanish in 1618.

== History ==
Wellington Front is a long stretch of curtain wall that forms part of the Line Wall Curtain. It stands on the site of the old city wall built during the Moorish period and subsequently modified by the Spanish and British. The Moorish wall had significant weaknesses which were pointed out as early as 1770, notably the fact that it had no advanced works to protect it from being bombarded or assaulted. These problems were tackled during the 1840s when Prince Albert's and Wellington Front were built to straighten and strengthen the line of the curtain wall.

The British proposed in 1826 to add a large bastion to the front but did not take the plan forward. In 1840, Major-General John Thomas Jones arrived to inspect the defences of Gibraltar. Jones advised on improvements for Gibraltar's fortifications including Parson's Lodge Battery and Wellington Front, which was named after the Duke of Wellington. The front was subsequently redesigned to mount heavy guns behind a curtain wall bounded by two demi-bastions. The demi-bastions were constructed on the sites of old Spanish platforms; the north one used to be the Plataforma de San Diego and the south one the Plataforma de San Francisco. Casemated accommodation was also built along the front to enable troops to shelter in relative safety.

Wellington Front was one of the last of Gibraltar's fortifications to be built by convict labour. 900 convicts were involved in its construction while they were housed in a prison ship called HMS Owen Glendower which was docked at Gibraltar Harbour. It was later estimated that local labour was cheaper, more productive and they could legally work for longer hours than British convicts.

The front was rearmed in the late 1850s with seven 68-pdrs. By 1863 it mounted six 68-pdrs., four 32-pdrs. and four-8-inch SB guns to provide flank defence. These were replaced in 1878 by a single 12.5-inch rifled muzzle loader (RML) gun weighing 36 tons – one of six brought to Gibraltar in 1877 – that was protected by an iron shield. The gun has since been removed, but its emplacement is still clearly visible on top of the face of the front's right bastion.
