= Henry Southwell (bishop) =

Henry Kemble Southwell
- Born: 20 November 1860
- Died: 9 March 1937 (aged 76); Chichester
- Education: Magdalen College, Oxford
- Occupation: third Bishop of Lewes
- Organization: Freemasons

Henry Kemble Southwell CMG VD (20 November 1860 – 9 March 1937) was the third Bishop of Lewes from 1920 until 1926.

== Biography ==
Southwell was born in 1860, sixth son of Thomas Martin Southwell, of Woodlands Hall, Bridgnorth, Shropshire, and educated at Charterhouse and Magdalen College, Oxford, he held curacies at Ellesmere, Shropshire (1885-88), St Clement's in Bournemouth (1888-91) and St Nicolas in Guildford (1891-92); then incumbencies at Chetton, Shropshire (1892-95) and Bodmin, Cornwall (1895-1903) before becoming a Canon Residentiary of Chichester Cathedral.

While in Cornwall, he held commission as an Acting Chaplain of the Forces with the Volunteer Force from 1895 to 1903 and undertook active service during the Boer War in South Africa in 1900. He was appointed chaplain to the 2nd Volunteer Battalion, Royal Sussex Regiment, in 1904. He was awarded the Volunteer Decoration in 1906 and became commissioned as a Chaplain in the newly formed Territorial Army in 1908. He served throughout the First World War in the Army Chaplains' Department, including abroad in France and Belgium. He was appointed Assistant Chaplain-General in 1916, and became a Companion of the Order of St Michael and St George in the 1916 Birthday Honours for services in the field, as well as being mentioned in despatches twice (1915 and 1916). He demobilised in 1919.

Already Archdeacon of Lewes and a Canon Residentiary of Chichester Cathedral since 1911, he was also appointed to the episcopate in 1920 and held the suffragan See of Lewes office for six years. He was consecrated into bishop's orders on St John the Baptist's Day 1920 (24 June), by Randall Davidson, Archbishop of Canterbury, at St Paul's Cathedral. He resigned his Archdeaconry in 1923, his See in 1926, and his canonry in 1935. At his death, he was Canon Precentor of Chichester Cathedral and Provost of Lancing College, and had been an Assistant Bishop of Chichester since 1930.

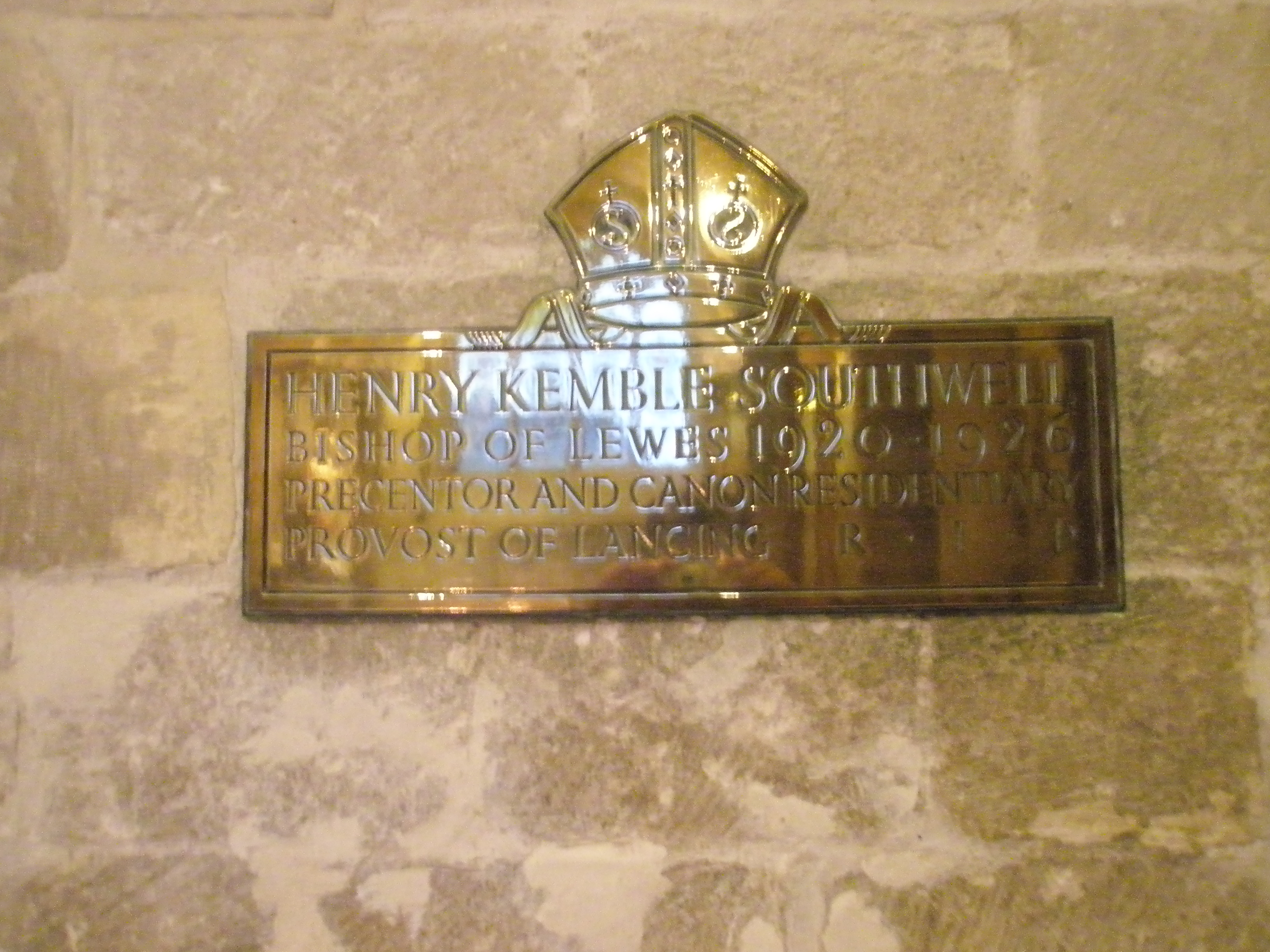
Memorial within Chichester Cathedral

Southwell died on 9 March 1937 in Chichester, aged 76, his son having predeceased him during the First World War. He was buried in the churchyard at nearby Rumbaldswyke on 13 March, on the same day as a requiem service was held at St Mary's Church in his native Bridgnorth. A fund initiated after his death yielded enough contributions to provide a memorial, which can be seen at St Cuthman Whitehawk in Brighton.

Southwell was a very prominent Freemason, initiated in the Apollo University Lodge, Oxford, in 1880. He was appointed as Grand Chaplain of the United Grand Lodge of England in 1913.

Church of England titles
Preceded by Herbert Jones	Bishop of Lewes; 1920–1926	Succeeded by Thomas Cook
