= Thomas Cook (bishop) =

Anglican Bishop of Lewes (1866–1928)

- Bishop of Lewes
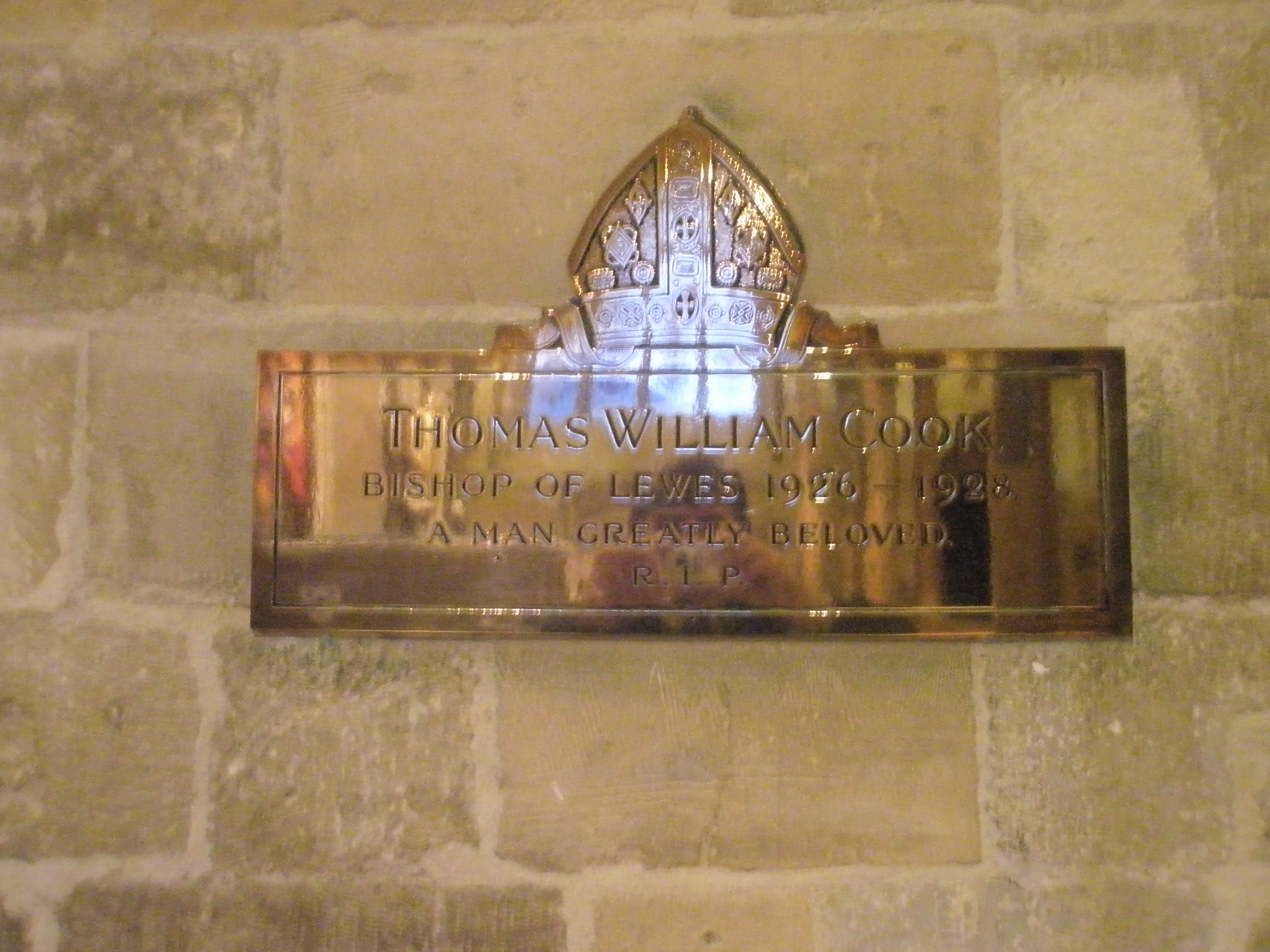
- Memorial within Chichester Cathedral
- Diocese: Diocese of Chichester
- In office: 1926–1928 (d.)
- Predecessor: Henry Southwell
- Successor: William Streatfeild
- Other post: Archdeacon of Hastings (1922–1928)

Orders
- Ordination: 1890 (deacon); 1891 (priest) by J. C. Ryle (Liverpool)
- Consecration: 1926 by Randall Davidson (Canterbury)

Personal details
- Born: 2 December 1866
- Died: 29 October 1928 (aged 61)
- Denomination: Anglican
- Education: Hertford College, Oxford

Thomas William Cook (2 December 1866 – 29 October 1928) was the Anglican Bishop of Lewes for a brief period in the second quarter of the 20th century.

== Biography ==
Born at Wellingborough and educated at Lancing College and Hertford College, Oxford, Cook was made deacon on Trinity Sunday (1 June) 1890 and ordained priest the next Trinity (24 May 1891) — both times by J. C. Ryle, Bishop of Liverpool, at St Peter's Pro-Cathedral. His ministry began with a curacy at Warrington after which he was appointed Assistant Principal of the Chester Diocesan Training College. He then began a long period within the Diocese of Chichester. From 1895 until 1911, he was Second Master and Chaplain at his old school and then successively Vicar, Rural Dean and Archdeacon of Hastings before being appointed to the episcopate. He was consecrated a bishop on Michaelmas (29 September) 1926, by Randall Davidson, Archbishop of Canterbury, at Westminster Abbey. A small brass memorial to him lies in the north aisle of Chichester Cathedral.

Church of England titles
Preceded by Henry Southwell	Bishop of Lewes; 1926 –1928	Succeeded by William Streatfeild
