= Craven Berkeley =

British politician (1805–1855)

Craven FitzHardinge Berkeley (May 1805 – 1 July 1855) was a British Whig politician.

== Background ==
Berkeley was the seventh son of Frederick Berkeley, 5th Earl of Berkeley, and Mary, daughter of William Cole. He was the younger brother of William Berkeley, 1st Earl FitzHardinge, Maurice Berkeley, 1st Baron FitzHardinge and Henry FitzHardinge Berkeley (born to the same mother but declared illegitimate according to a decision by the House of Lords) and also of the Hon. Grantley Berkeley.

== Political career ==
Craven entered Parliament for Cheltenham in 1832, a seat he held until 1847. In the 1847 general election the seat was won by Sir Willoughby Jones, but his election was declared void in May the following year. Berkeley was elected in his place in June 1848 but his election was declared void two months later. In 1852 he was again successfully returned for the constituency, and held the seat until his death three years later.

== Family ==
Berkeley married firstly Augusta, daughter of Sir Horace St Paul, 1st Baronet and widow of George Henry Talbot, in 1839. They had one daughter. After Augusta's death in April 1841, aged 28, he married secondly Charlotte, daughter of General Denzil Onslow, in 1845. Berkeley died in July 1855, aged 50. His daughter Louisa Mary succeeded as 15th Baroness Berkeley in 1882. Charlotte Berkeley died in January 1897.

Parliament of the United Kingdom
New constituency	Member of Parliament for Cheltenham; 1832–1847	Succeeded by Sir Willoughby Jones, Bt
Preceded by Sir Willoughby Jones, Bt	Member of Parliament for Cheltenham; 1848	Succeeded by Grenville Berkeley
Preceded by Grenville Berkeley	Member of Parliament for Cheltenham; 1852–1855	Succeeded by Francis Berkeley
