= Richard Jackson (bishop) =

British Anglican bishop and Lord Spiritual (born 1961)

The Right Reverend Richard Jackson
- Bishop of Hereford
- Church: Church of England
- Diocese: Diocese of Hereford
- In office: 2020 to present
- Predecessor: Richard Frith
- Other posts: Clerk of the Closet (2023–present); Bishop suffragan of Lewes (Chichester, 2014–2020)

Orders
- Ordination: 1994 (deacon); 1995 (priest)
- Consecration: 14 May 2014 by Justin Welby

Personal details
- Born: Richard Charles Jackson; 22 January 1961 (age 65)
- Denomination: Anglicanism
- Education: Christ Church, Oxford; Cranfield Institute of Technology; Trinity College, Bristol

Member of the House of Lords
- Lord Spiritual
- Bishop of Hereford; 23 January 2024

Richard Charles Jackson (born 22 January 1961) is a British Anglican bishop. He is the current Bishop of Hereford and Clerk of the Closet in the Church of England and a former Bishop suffragan of Lewes.

== Early life and education ==
Jackson was born on 22 January 1961. He studied at Latymer Upper School. He studied agriculture and forest sciences at Christ Church, Oxford, graduating with a Bachelor of Arts (BA) degree in 1983. He studied soil and water engineering at the Cranfield Institute of Technology, completing a Master of Science (MSc) degree in 1985. In 1992, he matriculated into Trinity College, Bristol, an Evangelical Anglican theological college: he spent the next two years studying theology and training for ordained ministry.

== Ordained ministry ==
Jackson was ordained into the Church of England: made a deacon at Petertide 1994 (2 July), by Eric Kemp, Bishop of Chichester, at Chichester Cathedral; and ordained a priest the Petertide following (2 July 1995), by Lindsay Urwin, Bishop of Horsham, at St Mary's, Horsham. After a curacy in Lindfield he was Vicar of Rudgwick from 1998 until 2009 (also Rural Dean of Horsham from 2005) when he became the Diocese of Chichester's Advisor for Mission and Renewal.

=== Episcopal ministry ===
Jackson was consecrated as a bishop on 14 May 2014 at Westminster Abbey by Justin Welby, Archbishop of Canterbury. From then, he served as Bishop of Lewes, a suffragan bishop in the Diocese of Chichester. It was announced on 3 September 2019 that Jackson was to become the next Bishop of Hereford; he was elected to that See on 6 December 2019 and his election confirmed 7 January 2020. As Bishop of Hereford, he took part in the 2023 Coronation as one of the two Bishops Assistant to Queen Camilla.

On 15 November 2023, Jackson was appointed Clerk of the Closet, head of the College of Chaplains of the Ecclesiastical Household of the Sovereign.

On 15 November 2023, Jackson gained a seat as a Lord Spiritual in the House of Lords through seniority as a diocesan bishop. He made his maiden speech on 22 February 2024 during a debate on poverty reduction.

=== Views ===
Jackson is evangelical and charismatic in churchmanship.

In January 2023, Jackson stated that he commended the proposed introduction of blessings for same-sex couples by the Church of England, and extended an apology to people who identify as LGBTQI+ for hurtful experiences in the church; "I know I bear some responsibility in this, and I am sorry for the hurt this has caused.". He later stated: "I did vote for the original motion [...] because I have no doubt about the many goods that we all see in committed, exclusive same-sex relationships and consider it right that these are affirmed." However, he also signed an open letter in response to the proposal which stated:

many Christians in the Church of England and the Anglican Communion, together with Christians from across the churches of world Christianity, continue to believe that marriage is given by God for the union of a man and woman and that it cannot be extended to those who are of the same sex. [...] Without seeking to diminish the value of many committed same-sex relationships, for which there is much to give thanks, we find ourselves constrained by what we sincerely believe the Scriptures teach which cannot be set aside.

Church of England titles
Preceded by Wallace Benn	Bishop of Lewes; 2014–2020	Succeeded by Will Hazlewood
Preceded by Richard Frith	Bishop of Hereford; 2020–present	Incumbent
Preceded by James Newcome	Clerk of the Closet; 2023–present	Incumbent
