= Bale Oak =

Former large oak tree in north Norfolk, England

Coordinates: 52.8907°N 0.9873°E

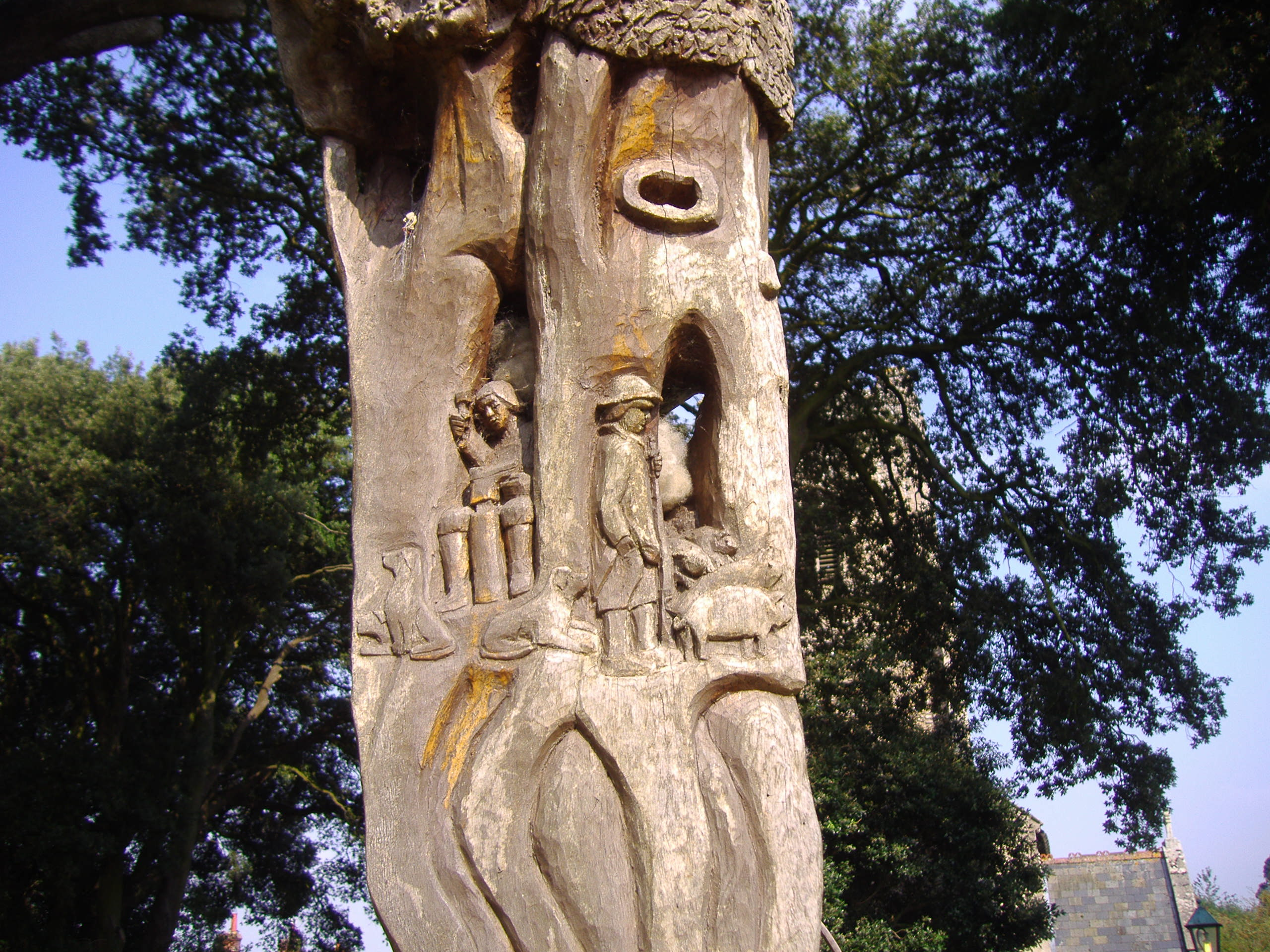
The top of the village sign depicts the Bale Oak

The Bale Oak was a large oak tree in Bale, a village in north Norfolk, England; it was over 500 years old when it was felled in 1860. It measured 36 feet (11 m) in circumference, and, reportedly, featured branches over 70 feet (21 m) long.

== History ==
In the middle of the 14th century, All Saints church was erected immediately east of the site of the tree. According to folk legend, the tree had previously been a site for pre-Christian worship and may have been a part of a larger grove.

In 1795, the oak was severely damaged. The oak was heavily pollarded and the removed bark and some of the wood was sold to the Hardys of Letheringsett for tanning.

Norfolk historian Rev. Blomfield recorded use of the oak in the 18th century:

A great oak at bathele near the church, its hollow so large that ten or twelve men may stand within it and a cobbler had his shop and lodge there of late and it is or was used for a swinestry.

Deemed dangerous by the local populace, the abuse of the tree led to its destruction in 1860. The Lord of the Manor Sir Willoughby Jones ordered the tree removed and, with much local mourning, the remains taken carted to Cranmer Hall at Fakenham.

The site is now covered by a grove of holm oaks and is protected by the National Trust.

== Sources ==
- Leaflet: Stone, Joyce E. 1966. As big as Bale Oak.
- Newspaper Article: Eastern Daily Press. 2015. Riddle of two skeletons found by builders in a former village pub. 8 December.
- Monograph: Bryant, T. H. 1902. Hundred of Holt. The Churches of Norfolk. Vol IX. p 2.
