= Leonard Burrows =

British Anglican bishop (1857–1940)

- Bishop of Sheffield
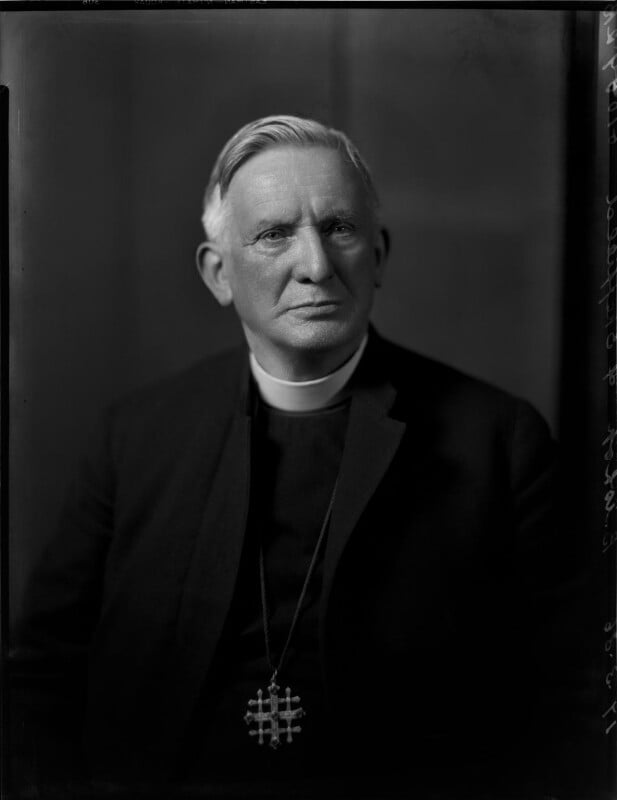
- Burrows in 1936
- Diocese: Diocese of Sheffield
- In office: 1914 – 1939 (ret.)
- Successor: Leslie Hunter
- Other post: Bishop of Lewes 1909–1914

Orders
- Ordination: 1881 (deacon); 1882 (priest) by Harold Browne (Win.)
- Consecration: 1909 by Randall Davidson (Cant.)

Personal details
- Born: 7 December 1857 Rugby, Warwickshire, UK
- Died: 6 February 1940 (aged 82)
- Denomination: Anglican
- Education: New College, Oxford

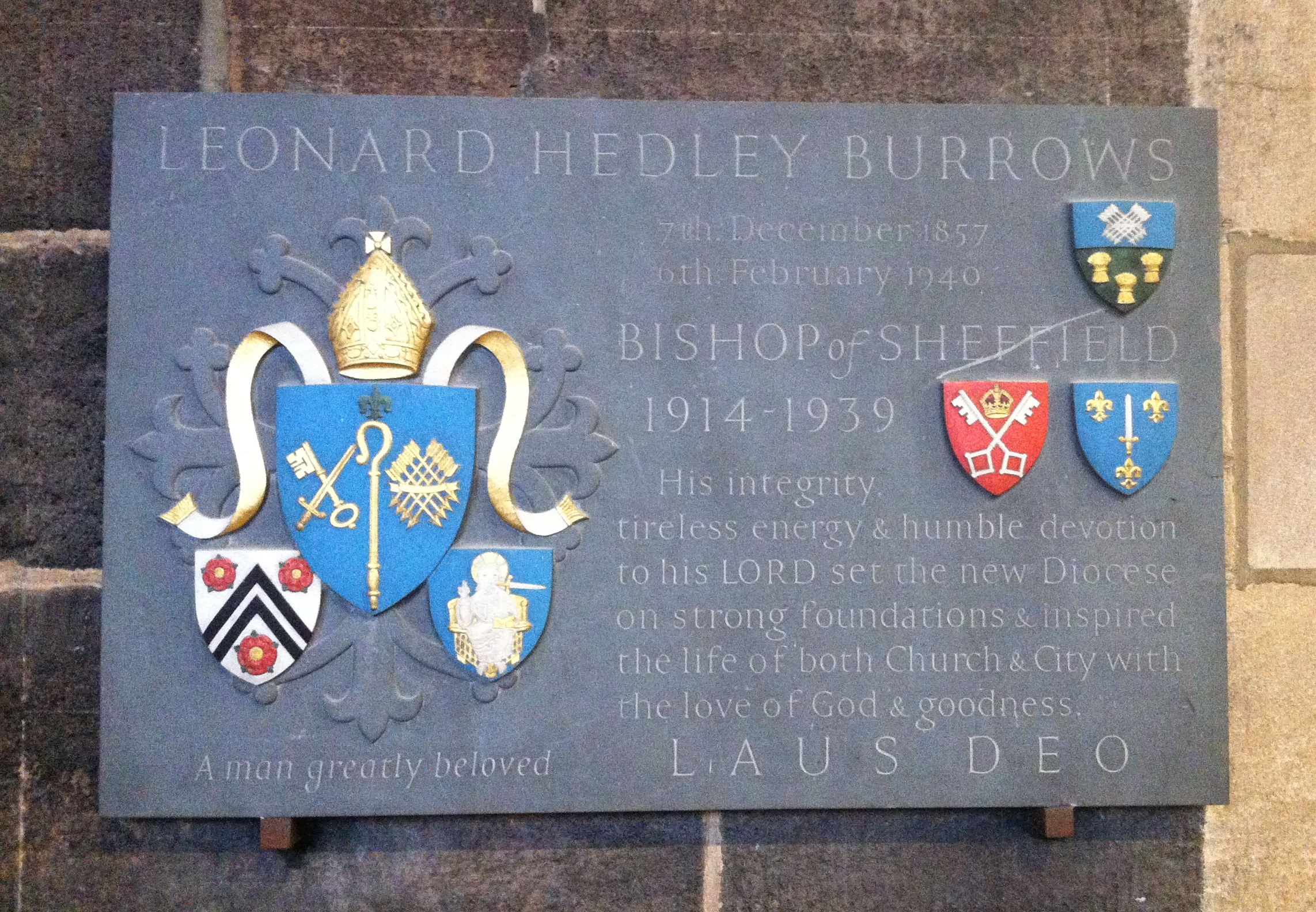
Memorial in Sheffield Cathedral

Leonard Hedley Burrows (7 December 1857 – 6 February 1940) was an Anglican bishop.

== Biography ==
Born at Rugby, Warwickshire on 7 December 1857, the son of the Rev. Leonard Francis Burrows and grandson of General Montagu Burrows, he was educated at Charterhouse and New College, Oxford. Made a deacon in Advent 1881 (18 December) at St Andrew's Church, Farnham and ordained priest the next St Thomas's Day (21 December 1882) at St Nicholas', Guildford — both times by Harold Browne, Bishop of Winchester — he was a Curate at Dorking after which he was Vicar of Wrecclesham and then Rural Dean of Godalming before his appointment as Bishop of Lewes.

He was consecrated a bishop on 11 July 1909, by Randall Davidson, Archbishop of Canterbury, at Croydon Parish Church. Translated to Sheffield on 21 March 1914 (in a service of investiture at York Minster), he served 25 years as its first diocesan bishop.

The key figure in the appointment of bishops at that time was the Prime Minister, H. H. Asquith. He regarded Burrows and his wife “as rather of the ‘pushing’ order”, but still had Burrows appointed to Sheffield although Burrows's whole career had been in the south of England.

Burrows was a strong supporter of British involvement in the First World War, even though his younger son, Leonard Righton Burrows, was killed in action. He had already written of ‘ ....personal devotion and self-sacrifice even unto death in the cause of righteousness, freedom and truth.’

Three months after his son's death, Burrows praised Church people who ‘have thrown their whole strength into the War’. Clergy were serving as chaplains and in the Royal Army Medical Corps, and 51 sons of clergymen had volunteered for the military. In 1917, Burrows opposed peace proposals and, in 1918, looked forward to total victory over Germany ‘For the first time in History there is a real chance of obtaining a lasting peace for the world. If the system of military and scientific barbarism for which Germany stands can be finally and completely destroyed, a League of Nations will be possible which shall exchange the law of force for the force of law. Is any sacrifice too great to achieve so priceless a blessing?’

Like so many of his generation, Burrows would be disappointed that a Second World War lay just two decades ahead.

Burrows retired from Sheffield in August, 1939, on the eve of the Second World War. He was described as a fine Christian gentleman and a splendid Diocesan.

He died on 6 February 1940 aged 82.

Burrows was the father of Hedley Burrows (Dean of Hereford) and grandfather of Simon Burrows (Bishop of Buckingham).

Church of England titles
| New title | Bishop of Lewes; 1909–1914 | Succeeded by Herbert Jones |
| Preceded by John Quirk as bishop suffragan | Bishop of Sheffield; 1914–1939 | Succeeded by Leslie Hunter |
