= Herbert Jones (bishop of Lewes) =

English clergyman (1861–1920)

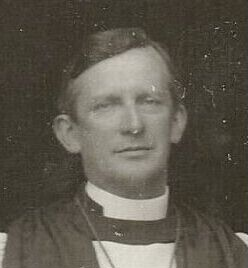
The Right Rev. Herbert Jones, Suffragan Bishop of Lewes

Herbert Edward Jones (6 April 1861 – 20 February 1920) was an English clergyman, the second Suffragan Bishop of Lewes and Archdeacon of Chichester.

== Biography ==
The second son of Sir Willoughby Jones, 3rd Baronet, he was educated at Eton College and Trinity College, Cambridge, ordained in 1884 and began his career with a curacy at St Andrews, Westminster. He was then successively the incumbent at Knebworth, Petworth and Hitchin before ascending being appointed Archdeacon of Chichester and ordinated as Suffragan Bishop of Lewes in 1914, posts he held until his death, after a long illness, at Hove on 20 February 1920.

== Notes ==
Church of England titles
Preceded by Leonard Hedley Burrows	Bishop of Lewes; 1914 – 1920	Succeeded by Henry Kemble Southwell
