= John Thomas Jones =

British officer in the Royal Engineers

Major-General Sir John Thomas Jones Bt KCB
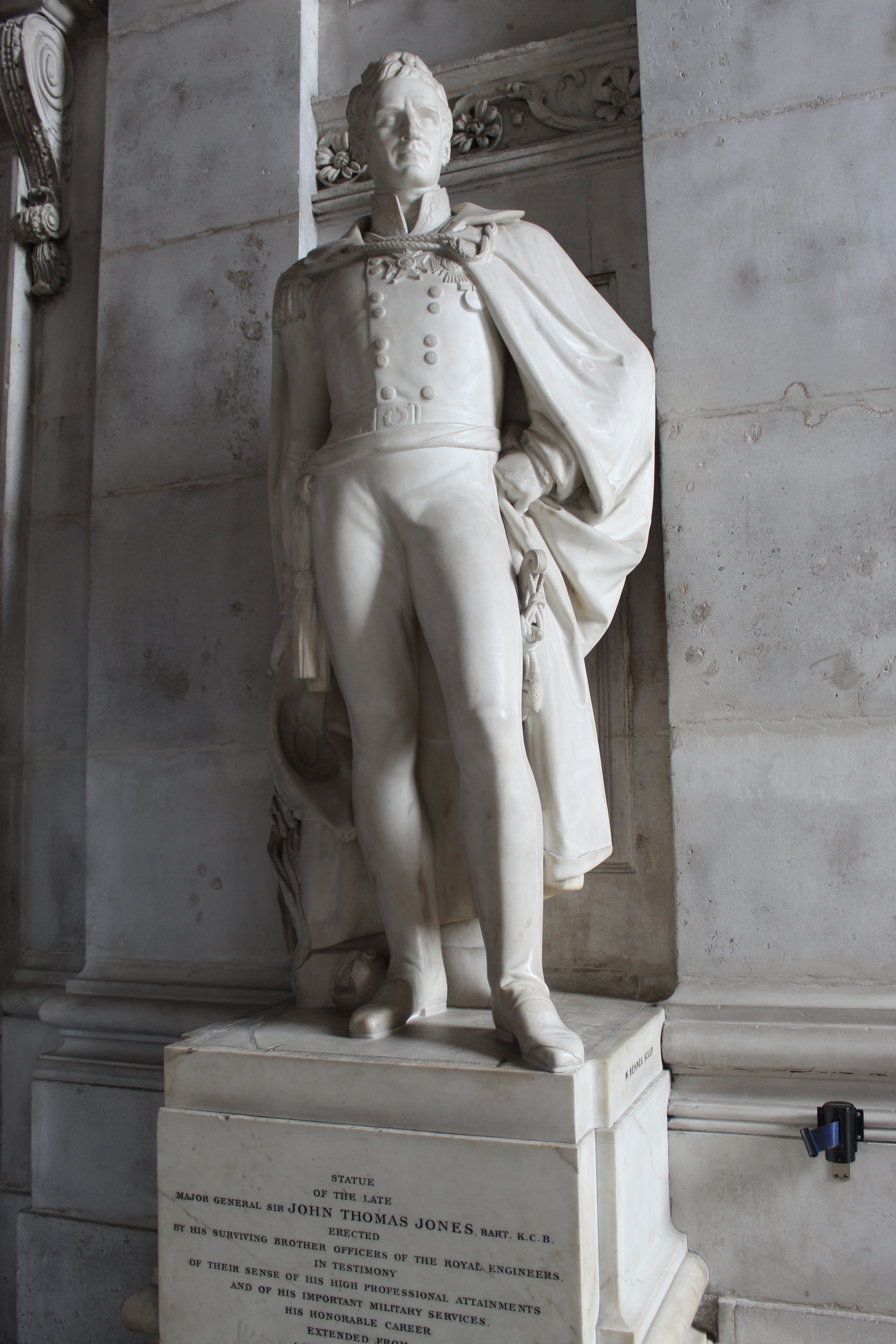
- Statue of Jones in St Paul's Cathedral, carved by William Behnes
- Born: 25 March 1783; Landguard Fort, Felixstowe, Suffolk, England
- Died: 26 February 1843 (aged 59) Cheltenham, Gloucestershire, England

Major-General Sir John Thomas Jones, 1st Baronet, KCB (25 March 1783 – 26 February 1843) was a British Army officer in the Royal Engineers who played a leading engineering role in a number of European campaigns of the early nineteenth century. Jones was revered by the Duke of Wellington and asked to advise on fortifications including the modernisation of the defences in Gibraltar. He was also notable as an English amateur cricketer who made six appearances.

== Biography ==
Sir John Thomas Jones was eldest of five sons of John Jones, esq., general superintendent at Landguard Fort, Felixstowe, Suffolk, and of Cranmer Hall, Fakenham, Norfolk, by his wife Mary, daughter of John Roberts of the 29th foot. He was born at Landguard Fort on 25 March 1783. Sir Harry David Jones was his brother. He was educated at the grammar school at Ipswich, joined the Royal Military Academy, Woolwich in the spring of 1797, received a commission as second lieutenant in the Royal Engineers on 30 August 1798, and embarked in October for Gibraltar. Jones advised on improvements for Gibraltar's fortifications including Parson's Lodge Battery and Wellington Front. He was appointed adjutant of the corps, and remained at Gibraltar four years. While at Gibraltar he was employed on the defences of the north front and in constructing the famous galleries; he also studied seriously, and became a good French and Spanish scholar. He was promoted lieutenant on 14 September 1800 and in 1803 he returned to England. There he was employed on the eastern coast in constructing defence works to oppose the threatened invasion, and in the following year in throwing up field-works from Widford to Galleywood Common (known as the Chelmsford lines), to cover London on that team.

=== Malta, Naples, Sicily ===
On 1 March 1805 Jones was promoted second captain, and soon after embarked at Portsmouth with the expedition under Sir James Craig. After some months' cruising the troops were disembarked in July at Malta, where Jones did garrison duty till the autumn. He then accompanied the expedition to Naples, and was detached with the commanding engineer to Calabria to retrench a position at Sapri for covering a re-embarkation. From Naples the troops sailed for Sicily, and, on the dethronement of the king, garrisoned Messina and Milazzo. Jones was employed under Major Lefebure in constructing works of defence. In the spring of 1806 Jones reported, under confidential instructions from the king of Naples, on the forts, harbours, and military condition of Sicily. His work was appreciated by the Neapolitan government, and was commended by Sir John Moore. In June 1806 Jones embarked at Messina with a force under Sir John Stuart, which landed in the bay of St. Euphemia. He was present at the battle of Maida, and marched with an advanced corps under General Oswald to sweep off the French detachments between Monteleone and Reggio, and to reduce Scylla Castle. The castle was so ably defended that its capture required all the formalities of a siege. Jones directed the attack with much credit, and after the capture of the castle persuaded Stuart to retain and strengthen it instead of blowing it up. Jones carried out this work so successfully that it was held until February 1808, proving during that time an invincible bar to the invasion of Sicily. When it was reduced to ruins by the French, the garrison was withdrawn in boats, without the loss of a single man, by means of a covered gallery constructed by Jones. Jones always held the retention of Scylla to be the most meritorious effort of his professional life. In December 1806 Jones returned to England, visiting Algiers on the way, and on 1 January 1807 was appointed adjutant at Woolwich (the headquarters) of the royal military artificers. The increasing demand of the war necessitated the augmentation of the local and independent companies of engineer workmen, and Jones was occupied till the following year in reorganising them into one regular corps.

=== Spain ===
In July 1808 Major Lefebure and Jones were selected to serve as the two assistant-commissioners under General Leith, appointed military and semi-diplomatic agent to the junta of the northern provinces of Spain. Jones was attached to the army of the Marquis de la Romana, and conceived a great affection for its commander. Towards the end of the year Leith was ordered to take command of a brigade and to select an officer to succeed him as commissioner. Leith offered to appoint Jones, but Jones declined, although the high rate of pay was tempting, on the ground that his youth and want of rank would deprive his advice of its proper weight, and he asked instead to join the army. Leith at once appointed him his acting aide-de-camp. Jones continued to act in this capacity until after the skirmish in front of Lugo, when he was ordered, as an engineer officer, to assist in blowing up the bridge over the Tamboya, and was employed with his own corps during the retreat to Corunna. On his arrival in England Jones resumed his staff appointment at Woolwich, and on 24 June 1809 was promoted first captain. On the 9th of the following month he was appointed brigade-major to the engineers under Brigadier-General Fyers, to accompany the expedition under the Earl of Chatham to Walcheren.

=== Zeeland ===
Jones acted throughout the operations in Zeeland as chief of the engineers' staff, and in that capacity carried out all the arrangements for the attack of Rammekins and Flushing. After the capitulation of Flushing Jones remained until the defences had been repaired and strengthened, and then returned to England, where he was appointed to command the engineers in the northern district.

=== Portugal ===
In March 1810 Jones was ordered to embark for Lisbon, where he was employed under Colonel (afterwards Sir) Richard Fletcher on the lines of Torres Vedras. In June Fletcher joined the headquarters of the army at Celerico, and Jones was appointed commanding engineer in the south of Portugal, and entrusted with the completion of the works to cover Lisbon from the threatened invasion of the French under Massena. The memoranda by Jones relative to these defences (printed for private circulation) form a most valuable military work, fully describing the various field-works forming the lines of Torres Vedras. All the arrangements for manning the works and placing the troops had been so well made by Jones that the several points were occupied as quickly and with as much regularity as if the troops had been re-entering their cantonments from a review.

On 17 November 1810 Jones was appointed brigade-major of engineers in the Peninsular, and was attached to the headquarters' staff, the details of the engineers' service in all parts of the Peninsular passing through his hands.

Jones held the appointment until May 1812, and was employed at all the sieges undertaken during that period. For his conduct during the operations against Ciudad Rodrigo he was particularly mentioned by Wellington in his despatches, and in consequence was gazetted brevet-major on 6 February 1812. At the siege of Badajoz Fletcher, the commanding engineer, was wounded, but at the express wish of Wellington retained his command, and the active duties therefore devolved upon Jones, his staff officer. In the assault of Fort Picuriaz Jones saved the life of Captain Holloway of the engineers, who had been shot down on the parapet and fell onto the fraise. For his exertions at the siege Jones was gazetted on 27 April 1812 brevet lieutenant-colonel, and he thereupon resigned his appointment as brigade-major.

=== East Spain ===
When it was determined to carry on operations on the eastern coast of Spain, Jones was appointed commanding engineer under General Maitland, and sailed from Lisbon in the beginning of June. On the disembarkation of the troops at Alicante, Jones received an appointment on the staff as assistant quartermaster-general, there being already an engineer officer senior to himself in command of the engineers. Owing to differences between the commanders of the allied forces, Jones was sent on a special mission to Madrid, to explain to Wellington the position of affairs. Travelling by night and avoiding roads, Jones reached Madrid safely, and was warmly received by Wellington, who, sending instructions by a courier, kept Jones to accompany him to the north to the siege of Burgos. During the progress of that siege, Jones was instructed to signal to Wellington by holding up his hat when the arrangements for exploding a mine and making a lodgment were complete. As the signal was not acknowledged, Jones repeated it until the French perceived him, and their fire brought him down with a bullet through his ankle. He with difficulty rolled himself into the parallel, but he ordered the mine to be fired, and the operations entrusted to him were successfully carried out before he left the field. Jones remained in a state of delirium for ten days, and as soon as he could be moved Wellington sent him to Lisbon in the only spring wagon at headquarters. The sufferings of this two months' journey severely tried his strength, and he remained in Lisbon until April 1813, when he was sent to England. Eighteen months of severe suffering followed. During this period he composed and published a volume entitled Journal of Sieges carried on by the Allies in Spain in 1810, 1811, and 1812. In this work he fearlessly exposed the deficiencies of the engineer service, which he attributed to the ignorance and military incapacity of the board of ordnance. These strictures naturally offended the dispensers of patronage. Wellington, however, although the book was published without his sanction, and sharply criticised his siege proceedings, praised it, and remained the author's friend.

=== Netherlands ===
In 1814 Jones visited the Netherlands, examined the principal fortresses, and afterwards met Wellington at Paris. Wellington told him that he had appointed him, with Brigadier-general (afterwards Sir) Alexander Bryce and another engineer officer, to report on the system of defence for the new kingdom of the Netherlands. The commissioners arrived in Brussels 21 March 1815. On 4 June 1815 Jones was made a C.B. On the appointment of Wellington to the command in the Netherlands, Jones accompanied him round some of the principal points of defence. At the end of August the reports of the commission were taken to Paris by Bryce and Jones and submitted to Wellington, with whom all details were settled by March 1816, when the commission was broken up. Jones was then selected to be Wellington's medium of communication with the Netherlands government for the furtherance of the objects of the report. In the previous December Jones, with Colonel Williamson of the artillery, acting as commissioners of the allied sovereigns, prevented the fortress of Charlemont from falling into the hands of the Prussians. The commissioners then took possession of Landrecy for the allies, and returned to Paris in January 1816.

In November 1816 a convention founded on the treaty of Paris was signed between England and the Netherlands, empowering Wellington to dispose of a fund of six millions and a half in constructing defensive works for the protection of the Netherlands, and to delegate his powers to as many inspectors as he pleased. The duke named Jones to be sole inspector, and persevered in this choice in spite of strong pressure on behalf of a superior officer. Jones's duty was to make periodical inspections of each fortress, to superintend the execution of the approved plans, sanction modifications, and check expenditure. Wellington generally made two inspections of some weeks annually, when he was always attended by Jones alone, and became very intimate with him. On the return to England of the army of occupation, Jones, who became a regimental lieutenant-colonel on 11 November 1816, was appointed to the command of the royal engineers and royal sappers and miners at Woolwich, and to the charge of the powder factories, while still acting as inspector in the Netherlands. In 1823 Jones was sent by Wellington to the Ionian Islands to confer with the high commissioner, Sir Thomas Maitland, respecting the defences of Corfu. His plans were approved and gradually carried out. On 27 May 1825 Jones was appointed aide-de-camp to the king, with the rank of colonel in the army. On 19 August 1830 Wellington sent him on a special mission to the Netherlands with a view to any military arrangements advisable on account of the recent revolution in France. At Ghent Jones heard of the rising in Brussels, went to the king of the Netherlands at the Hague, and at the king's request joined the Dutch army and the Prince of Orange at Antwerp. By his advice the prince went to Brussels, where he had a good military position and sufficient force to maintain himself. Two hours after Jones had left Brussels for London to report on his mission the prince retired to the Hague, thus abandoning his advantages and determining the subsequent course of the revolution. On 30 September 1831 Jones was created a baronet for his services in the Netherlands. In congratulating him upon the honour conferred on him, Wellington suggested a castle with the word 'Netherlands' as an addition to his armorial bearings. From 1835 to 1838 Jones's health compelled him to live in a southern climate. He was promoted major-general John Thomas Jones on 10 January 1837, and in 1838 he was made a K.C.B.

=== Great Britain ===
In the summer of 1839 Jones was requested by the master-general of the ordnance to revise and digest the projects of defence for British coasts and harbours, and in the spring of 1840 was a member of a commission upon the defences of the colonies. He next undertook at the request of government to lay down a general scheme of defence for Great Britain. In the beginning of October 1840 major-general John Thomas Jones was sent to Gibraltar to report on the defences of the fortress. Jones advised on improvements for Gibraltar's fortifications including Parson's Lodge Battery and Wellington Front. He remained there as major-general on the staff till June 1841, when he returned to England. His proposals for the improvement of the defences of Gibraltar were approved and gradually carried out. Jones advised on improvements such as those made to Parson's Lodge Battery where his advice caused eight guns to be installed in 1842. Jones also devised that new batteries should be sighted high above the Gibraltar Harbour that could take advantage of the increased height of the rock. One of these "retired batteries" was named Jones' Battery after him.

He died, after a day's illness, on 25 February 1843, at his residence, Pittville, Cheltenham.

== Appreciation ==
According to the Dictionary of National Biography, Jones may be ranked among the first military engineers of his day. He possessed talents of the highest order; great mathematical knowledge, coupled with sound judgment and deep reflection. He was present at six sieges, and at five of them acted as brigade-major, and his intimate knowledge of the details of these operations gives great value to his published works on them. His reputation as a military engineer was not confined to his own country. A statue by Behnes was erected to his memory in the south transept of St. Paul's Cathedral by the officers of the corps of royal engineers.

== Cricket ==
Jones was mainly associated with Middlesex. He made six known appearances from 1814 to 1819.

== Family ==
On 20 April 1816 Jones married, in London, Catherine Maria, daughter of Effingham Lawrence of New York City. He had three sons and a daughter. His eldest son, Sir Lawrence, was murdered by robbers on 7 November 1845 when travelling between Macri and Smyrna, and was succeeded in the baronetcy by his brother Willoughby, who died in 1884, and whose eldest son, Lawrence, born in 1857, was the fourth baronet.

His brother George Matthew Jones was a Royal Navy captain.

== Publications ==
Jones was the author of a short account of Sir John Stuart's campaign in Sicily, published in 1808; Journal of Sieges carried on by the Army under the Duke of Wellington in Spain between the years 1811 and 1814, 1814; Account of the War in Spain, Portugal, and the South of France from 1808 to 1814 inclusive, 1817. He also printed in 1829 for private circulation Memoranda relative to the Lines thrown up to cover Lisbon in 1810; these were afterwards published in the Professional Papers of the Corps of Royal Engineers. A third edition of the Journal of the Sieges was published in 1843, and edited by his brother, Sir Harry David Jones, who added some valuable information, and incorporated in this edition the memoranda on the lines of Torres Vedras. Jones's Reports relating to the Re-establishment of the Fortresses in the Netherlands from 1814 to 1830 were also, by permission of the minister for war, edited by Sir Harry Jones, and printed for private circulation among the officers of the corps of royal engineers.

== Notes ==
Baronetage of the United Kingdom
New creation	Baronet (of Cranmer Hall); 1831–1843	Succeeded by Laurence Jones
