= Willoughby Jones =

Sir Willoughby Jones 3rd Baronet (24 November 1820 – 21 August 1884) was a Norfolk landowner and an English Conservative Party politician. He was briefly Member of Parliament (MP) for the Cheltenham constituency.

Jones was the second son of Major-General John Thomas Jones, who had earlier fought in the Peninsula, and his wife Catherine Lawrence. He was educated at Eton and Trinity College, Cambridge, where he graduated in 1843 with BA. The Jones baronetcy was created in 1831 for his father, who died in 1843. Willoughby Jones inherited the baronetcy from his brother Lawrence, who was murdered in Turkey in 1845.

In July 1847 he won the seat of Cheltenham by a majority of 108; however, he was unseated by petition in May 1848. He was a member of the Canterbury Association from 27 March 1848. He lived at Cranmer Hall near Fakenham in Norfolk where in 1860 he had to order the felling of the Bale Oak. He was appointed High Sheriff of Norfolk in 1851.

On 15 April 1856, he married his cousin Emily Taylor Jones, the daughter of Henry Taylor-Jones (1790–1860), who was his father's half-brother. Their daughter Maud was deaf and subject to the interest of Alexander Graham Bell, whose initial research on the telephone was to improve communication with the deaf. The Right Reverend Herbert Jones, second son of the third Baronet, was suffragan Bishop of Lewes. Jones passed the baronetcy to his eldest son when he died on 21 August 1884.

Parliament of the United Kingdom
Preceded by Craven Berkeley	Member of Parliament for Cheltenham; 1847–1848 by-election	Succeeded by Craven Berkeley
Honorary titles
Preceded by Edward Roger Pratt	High Sheriff of Norfolk; 1851	Succeeded by Frederick William Irby
Baronetage of the United Kingdom
Preceded by Lawrence Jones	Baronet (of Cranmer Hall); 1845–1884	Succeeded by John Jones
