= Ian Cundy =

Church of England cleric

The Right Reverend Ian Cundy
- Bishop of Peterborough
- Church: Church of England
- Diocese: Diocese of Peterborough
- In office: 1996–2009
- Predecessor: Bill Westwood
- Successor: Donald Allister
- Other posts: Area Bishop of Lewes; 1992–1996

Orders
- Ordination: c. 1969
- Consecration: c. 1992

Personal details
- Born: 23 April 1945 Sherborne, Dorset
- Died: 7 May 2009 (aged 64)
- Buried: Peterborough Cathedral
- Denomination: Anglican
- Parents: Henry Martyn Cundy and Kathleen Ethel Hemmings
- Spouse: Josephine Katherine Boyd m. 1969
- Children: 2 sons, 1 daughter
- Education: Trinity College, Cambridge

Member of the House of Lords
- Lord Spiritual
- Bishop of Peterborough; 28 March 2001 – 7 May 2009

Ian Patrick Martyn Cundy (23 April 1945 – 7 May 2009) was a Church of England cleric who served successively as area Bishop of Lewes and Bishop of Peterborough.

== Background ==
Born in Sherborne, Dorset, on 23 April 1945, he was the son of Henry Martyn Cundy and his wife Kathleen Ethel Hemmings. He was educated at Monkton Combe School in Somerset and then at Trinity College, Cambridge, where he graduated with a Bachelor of Arts in mathematics and theology in 1967, and obtained a Master of Arts. Cundy made his general ordination exam in Tyndale Hall, Trinity College, Bristol in 1969.

== Career ==
Cundy was made a deacon at Michaelmas 1969 (28 September), by Trevor Huddleston, Bishop of Stepney, at All Saints Church, Benhilton, and ordained a priest the Michaelmas following (27 September 1970), by Mervyn Stockwood, Bishop of Southwark, at Southwark Cathedral; he served first as assistant curate of Christ Church, New Malden until 1973 and subsequently lecturer and chaplain of Oak Hill Theological College in Southgate, London until 1977. A year later, he was nominated team rector in Mortlake and East Sheen, a post he held until 1983. Thereafter Cundy became warden of Cranmer Hall, Durham until 1992, when he was appointed area Bishop of Lewes in the Diocese of Chichester. He was consecrated a bishop on 3 July 1992 by George Carey, Archbishop of Canterbury, at Westminster Abbey, He was enthroned as the 37th Bishop of Peterborough in 1996, where he remained until his death in May 2009.

Cundy served as a member of the board of governors of Monkton Combe School from 1986 to 1995.

== Illness and death ==
In November 2007, it was announced that Cundy was undergoing treatment for pleural mesothelioma, a rare form of lung cancer. In October 2008, he announced his intention to take early retirement in July 2009 due to ill health. Cundy died on 7 May 2009 at the age of 64, after collapsing on his way to a family event. He was survived by his wife, Josephine Katherine Boyd whom he married in 1969, and their children, two sons and one daughter. Following a Eucharist in Peterborough Cathedral, Cundy was buried, a week after his death.

== Cundy lecture series ==
A lecture series was established in his name at Cranmer Hall, Durham. The 2011 lecture was given by Mary Tanner.

Academic offices
Preceded by	Warden of Cranmer Hall; 1983–1992	Succeeded by John Pritchard
