= Mathematical Models (Cundy and Rollett) =

1951 book on crafting mathematical objects

- Title page for Mathematical Models (1961 edition)
- Author: Martyn Cundy; A. P. Rollett
- Language: English
- Genre: Mathematics
- Publisher: Clarendon Press
- Publication date: 1951
- Publication place: United Kingdom

Mathematical Models is a book on the construction of physical models of mathematical objects for educational purposes. It was written by Martyn Cundy and A. P. Rollett, and published by the Clarendon Press in 1951, with a second edition in 1961. Tarquin Publications published a third edition in 1981.

The vertex configuration of a uniform polyhedron, a generalization of the Schläfli symbol that describes the pattern of polygons surrounding each vertex, was devised in this book as a way to name the Archimedean solids, and has sometimes been called the Cundy–Rollett symbol as a nod to this origin.

== Topics ==
The first edition of the book had five chapters, including its introduction which discusses model-making in general and the different media and tools with which one can construct models. The media used for the constructions described in the book include "paper, cardboard, plywood, plastics, wire, string, and sheet metal".

The second chapter concerns plane geometry, and includes material on the golden ratio, the Pythagorean theorem, dissection problems, the mathematics of paper folding, tessellations, and plane curves, which are constructed by stitching, by graphical methods, and by mechanical devices.

The third chapter, and the largest part of the book, concerns polyhedron models, made from cardboard or plexiglass. It includes information about the Platonic solids, Archimedean solids, their stellations and duals, uniform polyhedron compounds, and deltahedra.

The fourth chapter is on additional topics in solid geometry and curved surfaces, particularly quadrics but also including topological manifolds such as the torus, Möbius strip and Klein bottle, and physical models helping to visualize the map coloring problem on these surfaces. Also included are sphere packings. The models in this chapter are constructed as the boundaries of solid objects, via two-dimensional paper cross-sections, and by string figures.

The fifth chapter, and the final one of the first edition, includes mechanical apparatus including harmonographs and mechanical linkages, the bean machine and its demonstration of the central limit theorem, and analogue computation using hydrostatics. The second edition expands this chapter, and adds another chapter on computational devices such as the differential analyser of Vannevar Bush.

Much of the material on polytopes was based on the book Regular Polytopes by H. S. M. Coxeter, and some of the other material has been drawn from resources previously published in 1945 by the National Council of Teachers of Mathematics.

== Audience and reception ==
At the time they wrote the book, Cundy and Rollett were sixth form teachers in the UK, and they intended the book to be used by mathematics students and teachers for educational activities at that level. However, it may also be enjoyed by a general audience of mathematics enthusiasts.

Reviewer Michael Goldberg notes some minor errors in the book's historical credits and its notation, and writes that for American audiences some of the British terminology may be unfamiliar, but concludes that it could still be valuable for students and teachers. Stanley Ogilvy complains about the inconsistent level of rigor of the mathematical descriptions, with some proofs given and others omitted, for no clear reason, but calls this issue minor and in general calls the book's presentation excellent. Dirk ter Haar is more enthusiastic, recommending it to anyone interested in mathematics, and suggesting that it should be required for mathematics classrooms. Similarly, B. J. F. Dorrington recommends it to all mathematical libraries, and The Basic Library List Committee of the Mathematical Association of America has given it their strong recommendation for inclusion in undergraduate mathematics libraries. By the time of its second edition, H. S. M. Coxeter states that Mathematical Models had become "well known".
