= Martyn Cundy =

British mathematics educator (1913–2005)

- Born: Henry Martyn Cundy; 23 December 1913; Derby, Derbyshire, England
- Died: 25 February 2005 (aged 91); Kendal, Cumbria, England
- Education: Monkton Combe School; Trinity College, Cambridge
- Known for: The School Mathematics Project
- Awards: Rayleigh Prize (1937)
- Scientific career
- Fields: Mathematics; Pedagogy
- Workplaces: Sherborne School, Sherborne, Dorset; University of Malawi, Lilongwe

Henry Martyn Cundy (23 December 1913 – 25 February 2005) was a mathematics teacher and professor in Britain and Malawi as well as a singer, musician and poet. He was one of the founders of the School Mathematics Project to reform O level and A level teaching. Through this he had a big effect on maths teaching in Britain and especially in Africa.

== Education and career ==
Cundy attended Monkton Combe School from 1927 to 1932, going on to read mathematics at Trinity College, Cambridge, where he earned a PhD in quantum theory in 1938. In 1937, Cundy was awarded the Cambridge University Rayleigh Prize for Mathematical Physics (now known as the Rayleigh-Knight Prize) for an essay entitled "Motion in a Tetrahedral Field". Others awarded the Rayleigh Prize include Royal Society Fellows Alan Turing and Fred Hoyle; instead of acquiring a University position, Cundy initially chose work at the secondary school level. He taught at the Sherborne School from 1938 to 1966 and became prominently involved in the reform of school mathematics teaching in Great Britain. Secondary school Mathematics teachers became aware of Cundy after the appearance of his and his co-author A.P. Rollett's Mathematical Models, in continuous publication since 1952. A book focusing on the model construction of many of the regular polyhedra and other mathematical objects, Mathematical Models has remained "an inspiration for generations of mathematics teachers". Cundy was Deputy Director of the School Mathematics Project between 1967 and 1968. In 1968 he became Chair of Mathematics at the University of Malawi, and held the post until 1975.

Cundy spent many years publishing dozens of articles in The Mathematical Gazette, including at age 89 the "Article of the Year" for 2003, entitled "A Journey round the Triangle: Lester's Circle, Kiepert's Hyperbola and a Configuration from Morley".

== Personal life ==
He married Kathleen Ethel ("Kittie") Hemmings in 1939 and had three children, including Ian Cundy, successively Bishop of Lewes and of Peterborough.

Martyn Cundy was a devout Christian and especially notable for his ecumenical views toward worship. In 1932 he was secretary of the Cambridge University Prayer Fellowship. Subsequently he served as a Methodist lay preacher and after taking up his position at the University of Malawi, an elder in the Malawi Presbyterian Church.

In Malawi Cundy learned to speak the Chewa language and he and his wife Kittie were active members of the university community there. The Cundys were enthusiastic trekkers and together they contributed a walking guide to the Zomba Massif.

On returning to the U.K. in 1975, the Cundys settled in Kendal and became active in the church community there. Martyn Cundy continued with his contributions to mathematics, religion and pedagogy for the remainder of his life.

== Publications ==
- The Faith of a Christian (London: Inter-Varsity Press, 1950).
- Mathematical Models, with A.P. Rollett (London: Oxford University Press, 1952).
- More than fifty articles in the Mathematical Gazette, including "Article of the Year" in 2003.
