= Bishop of Lewes =

Christian episcopal title

The Bishop of Lewes is an episcopal title used by a suffragan bishop of the Church of England Diocese of Chichester, in the Province of Canterbury, England. The title takes its name after Lewes, the county town of East Sussex. The bishops suffragan of Lewes were area bishops since the Chichester area scheme was erected in 1984 until 2013. The suffragan bishop has oversight of the archdeaconries of Hastings & Brighton and Lewes.

The present bishop, since July 2020, is Will Hazlewood.

== List of bishops ==
Bishops of Lewes
| From | Until | Incumbent | Notes |
|---|---|---|---|
| 1909 | 1914 | Leonard Burrows | Translated to Sheffield |
| 1914 | 1920 | Herbert Jones | |
| 1920 | 1926 | Henry Southwell | |
| 1926 | 1928 | Thomas Cook | |
| 1928 | 1929 | William Streatfeild | |
| 1929 | 1946 | Hugh Hordern | |
| 1946 | 1959 | Geoffrey Warde | |
| 1959 | 1977 | Lloyd Morrell | |
| 1977 | 1992 | Peter Ball | First area bishop from 1984; translated to Gloucester. Pleaded guilty to two counts of indecent assault and one of misconduct in a public office while Bishop of Lewes |
| 1992 | 1996 | Ian Cundy | Translated to Peterborough |
| 1997 | 2012 | Wallace Benn | Retired on 31 October 2012; last area bishop until his retirement |
| 2014 | 2020 | Richard Jackson | Translated to Hereford, 7 January 2020 |
| 2020 | present | Will Hazlewood | Consecrated 15 July 2020 (afternoon) |
