= Lindsay Urwin =

Australian Anglican bishop

The Right Reverend Lindsay Urwin OGS
- Vicar of Christ Church Brunswick
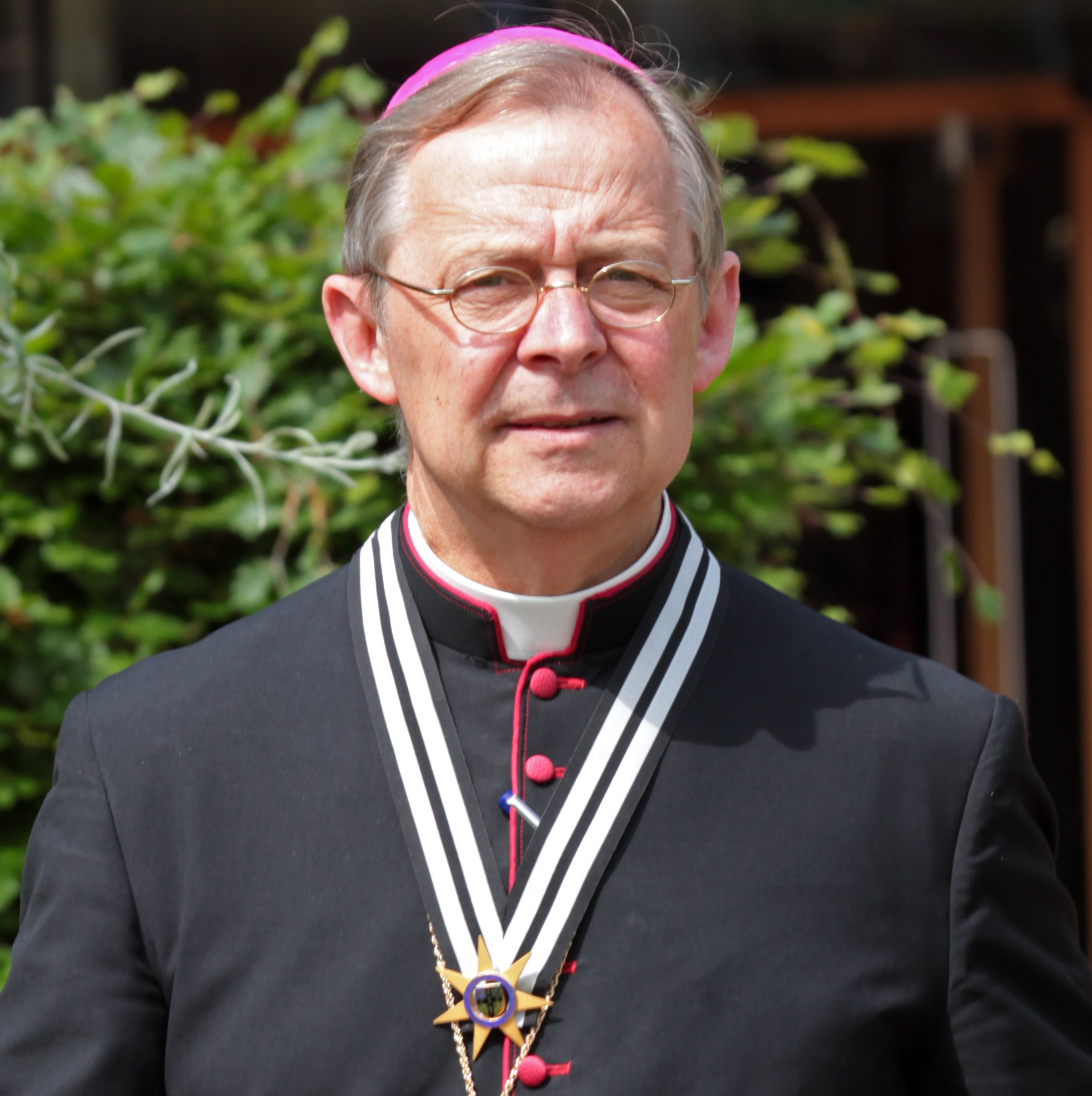
- Urwin in 2014
- Church: Anglican Church of Australia
- Diocese: Melbourne
- In office: 2015 to 2023
- Previous posts: Administrator of the Anglican Shrine of Our Lady of Walsingham (2009-2015); Bishop of Horsham (1993-2009)

Orders
- Ordination: 1980 (deacon); 1981 (priest)
- Consecration: 1993 by George Carey

Personal details
- Born: 13 March 1956 (age 70) Australia
- Denomination: Anglican
- Education: Ripon College Cuddesdon

Lindsay Goodall Urwin OGS (born 13 March 1956) is an Australian Anglican bishop. Urwin was the area Bishop of Horsham in the Diocese of Chichester, in southern England, from 1993 to 2009, and was also the principal organiser of the annual Caister Conference. He was the administrator of the Anglican Shrine of Our Lady of Walsingham from 2009 to 2015. On 12 April 2015, his appointment was announced as vicar of Christ Church Brunswick in the Anglican Diocese of Melbourne, Australia; he was inducted on 15 September 2015. He retired in 2023, and returned to the United Kingdom and the Church of England.

== Early life and family ==
Urwin was born in Australia and attended Camberwell Grammar School in Melbourne.

His sister is Kate Prowd, who is also a bishop in the Diocese of Melbourne; they are believed to be the only brother-sister bishops in the Anglican Communion.

His brother is Michael Urwin, who was headmaster of Brighton Grammar School, an Headmasters' and Headmistresses' Conference independent school, from 1996 to 2013, and has been the registrar of the Diocese of Melbourne since 2019.

Urwin began theological study at the Trinity College Theological School, Melbourne, in 1974 and was an ordination candidate for the Diocese of Melbourne. In 1976, Urwin moved to England where, following a short period living and working in London, he resumed studies in theology at Ripon College Cuddesdon.

== Ordained ministry ==
Urwin was made deacon at Petertide 1980 (29 June) and ordained priest the Petertide following (28 June 1981), both times by Ronnie Bowlby, Bishop of Southwark, at Southwark Cathedral. After being the curate of St Peter's, Walworth (1980–83) he was then the vicar of St Faith's, North Dulwich (1983–88).

Urwin was a diocesan missioner in the Chichester diocese from 1988 to 1993 before being asked by the then Bishop of Chichester, Eric Kemp, to be the Bishop of Horsham in West Sussex in 1993 at the age of 37. He was consecrated a bishop on 30 November 1993 by George Carey, Archbishop of Canterbury, at Westminster Abbey. He became a member of the Oratory of the Good Shepherd (OGS) in 1991 and served as its United Kingdom provincial (head) from 1996 to 2005. OGS is an international religious society of priests and laymen bound together by a common rule and discipline, including a requirement of celibacy.

On 14 August 2008 it was announced that Urwin had accepted a new appointment as administrator of the Shrine of Our Lady of Walsingham. As a result, he tendered his resignation as area Bishop of Horsham on 28 February 2009. He was the administrator of the shrine from early 2009 until early September 2015.

In September 2015 he returned to Australia to become the vicar of Christ Church, Brunswick, in the Diocese of Melbourne. He is also the Bishop for Schools in the diocese.

He retired in 2023, and returned to the United Kingdom. He is an honorary assistant bishop of the Diocese of Southwark and holds permission to officiate in the Diocese of Chichester.

== Issues of sexuality ==
Urwin has stated his personal position on homosexuality as follows:

"I'm a celibate bishop - there is no other option. Whether heterosexual or homosexual or the grey in between, a bishop has no choice. The Church has a right to expect that he will be an example to the flock.

He may have all the compassion in the world for others; be sympathetic, tolerant and respectful to those who feel unable to embrace the Church's teaching, and number them among his dearest friends. In his own mind he may even wonder about the current stand of the Church on marriage or homosexuality, but if he accepts the gift of episcopacy, his personal duty is clear. Whatever the wonderings and wanderings of his former life, for which he must repent, as a bishop he must embrace the discipline of chastity as a gift."

During a discussion about sexuality at a residential bishop's council meeting of the Chichester diocese in 2005, Urwin, who is theologically conservative, spoke passionately against homophobia. He made it clear that vacant parishes in his region in search of a new priest could not state a preference for a married priest and that he did not allow prurient questioning of candidates. The key question he said was to be found in the ordinal, 'Will you model your life, and that of your household according to the mind of Christ?' The response, 'I will do so the Lord being my helper' reflected both the candidates best intentions and his or her clear need for grace. He said that he encouraged single clergy not to live alone but to form a household and develop Godly friendships. He also said that he knew the risks and the raised eyebrows this sometimes raised from his own experience as an unmarried priest and bishop. He went on to say that in the experience of many single priests and bishops, some of whom who are of homosexual orientation, the embracing of celibacy either as a spiritual gift or in obedience to what the church asks of them, still does not seem to be enough.

== Beliefs and opinions ==
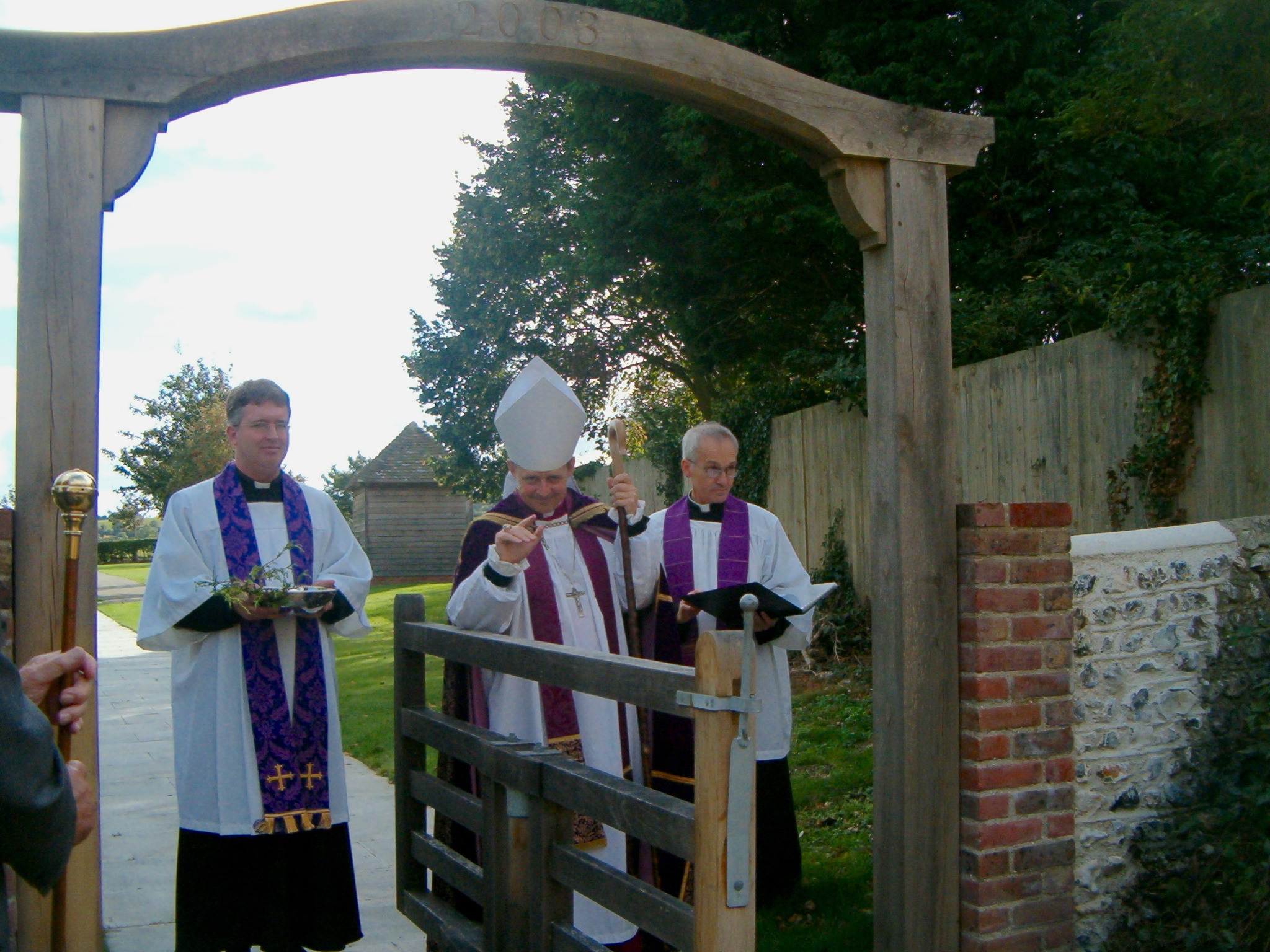
Urwin consecrating a new churchyard Tapsel gate in Sussex in 2004

Urwin has a particular interest in youth ministry and has encouraged people to remember Jesus as an adolescent, "breaking voice, hormones and all". He was co-presenter of the "Youthful Spirit" youth ministry presentation to the 1998 international Lambeth Conference of bishops with David Moxon.

Urwin has argued for tolerance of conservative voices including those who oppose the ordination of women.

Urwin was interviewed by Ali G on the 11 O'Clock Show. He later said that he realised he was being set up before the end of the interview and used it to his advantage.

Urwin has also appeared on an episode of Gordon Ramsay's Kitchen Nightmares, where he was invited to attend dinner at a former chapel- converted restaurant, The Priory in Hayward's Heath (see 29.22).

== Awards and qualifications ==
- In 2003, after several years of part-time study, he received an MA degree in liturgy from Heythrop College, University of London.
- In 2006 he was appointed as a full member of the College of Guardians of the Shrine of Our Lady of Walsingham, remaining an Emeritus Guardian after his return to Australia.
- In 2011, whilst serving at Walsingham, he received an honorary Doctor of Divinity degree from Nashotah House.

== Publications ==
- Youthful Spirit (1999)
- Credo: a course for the curious (1997)
- Mission-shaped Youth: Rethinking Young People and Church by Lindsay Urwin, Tim Sudworth, Graham Cray, and Chris Russell (May 2007)

== Sources ==
- Who's Who (2007 edition)
- Crockford's Clerical Directory

Church of England titles
Preceded by John Hind	Bishop of Horsham; 1993–2009	Succeeded by Mark Sowerby
