= Bazil Marsh =

Archdeacon of Northampton

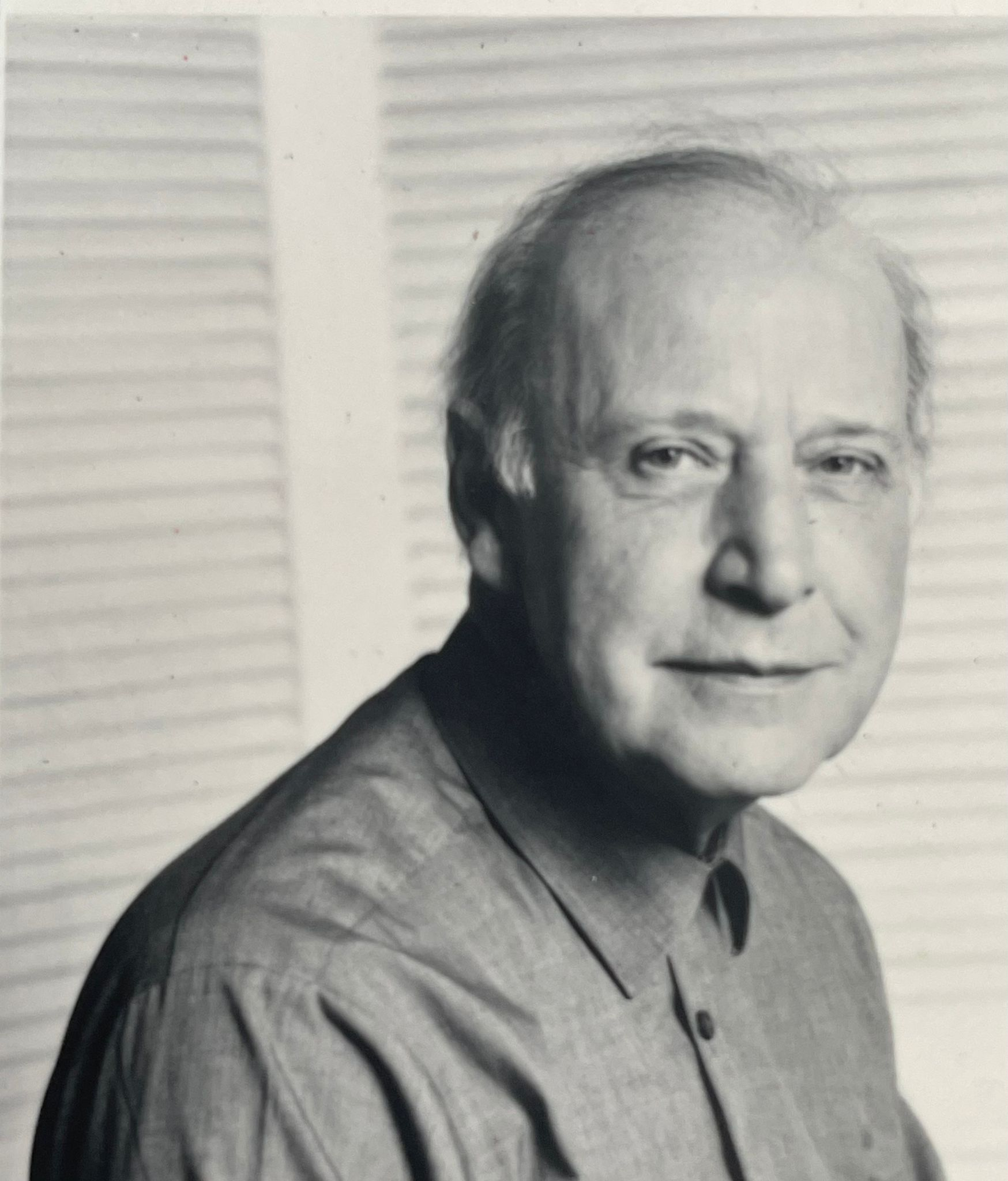

Archdeacon of Northampton
- In office 1964–1991
- Preceded by: Ronald Cedric Osbourne Goodchild
- Succeeded by: Michael Robin Chapman

Personal details
- Born: Bazil Roland Marsh; August 11, 1921 Three Hills, Alberta, Canada
- Died: May 23, 1997 (aged 75) Northampton, England
- Education: University of Leeds; College of the Resurrection, Mirfield
- Occupation: Clergy

Bazil Roland Marsh, MLitt (b Three Hills 11 August 1921 d Northampton 23 May 1997) was Archdeacon of Northampton from 1964 to 1991; later Archdeacon Emeritus.

Bazil Marsh was educated at the University of Leeds and the College of the Resurrection, Mirfield. After curacies in Cheshunt, Coventry and Reading he was Rector of St Peter's Anglican Church, Townsville, North Queensland, Australia from 1951 and of St Mary the Virgin, Far Cotton, Northampton, UK from 1956 until his appointment as Archdeacon.

== Early years ==
The Venerable Bazil Marsh, Archdeacon of Northampton from 1964-1991, was born in Canada in 1921. His early childhood memories of the hardships facing the First Nations communities and immigrants in North Dakota during the Depression, alongside the loss of both parents by age 8, set the stage for his life’s work as a priest, mentor, and executive in the Church of England. His belief in the positive potential of people, regardless of creed, ethnicity, or privilege was the primus motor of his ministry as a priest. He was educated at state schools in the USA and UK before attending Leeds University where he read history. Having graduated from College of the Resurrection, Mirfield, he was a curate at Cheshunt from 1944-1946. Further curacies in Coventry and Reading followed before becoming Rector of St Peter’s Anglican Church, Townsville, Queensland, Australia in 1951. This post also required responsibilities as a chaplain in the Royal Australian Airforce, requiring travel to New Guinea, over a thousand kilometers away. During the next five years a pioneering spirit also reflected in his father’s life, who had become Archdeacon at the age of 34 in Williston, North Dakota, was given ample scope through abilities in adapting to constraints, and successfully managing the demands of complex geographical and social environments.

== Later years ==
In 1956 he was appointed Vicar of St Mary’s the Virgin, Far Cotton, Northampton, UK, a densely populated traditional low-income urban area significantly different to a North Queensland parish spread over a vast geographical area. Having managed the parish with a team of curates for eight years through an impressive ministry, including extensive pastoral outreach and care and exceptional administrative skill, at the age of 43 he was, to popular acclaim, made Archdeacon of Northampton. This post was combined with responsibility for the 12th Century St Peter’s Church, Northampton, and a non-residentiary canonry of Peterborough. Although his primary responsibility lay with the parishes of the archdeaconry, his tenure was characterized by special concern for the needs of marginalized individuals and communities, leading to the realization of practical initiatives. Thus, in the 1970s he was involved with West Indian community interests, building bridges between Anglicans and Lutherans, supporting equity of access for the hearing impaired, and raising awareness of the strategies and implications of cult recruitment campaigns, amongst others. In the 1980s, his historical and architectural acumen was utilized by English Heritage, through which he maintained his view that appropriate forms of architecture laid a foundation for creating healthy and sustainable living environments. In recognition of his achievements in this field, he was awarded an M. Litt by Lambeth Palace in 1991. Later he acted as consultant to the Anglican church in Rwanda, supported initiatives for orphans in South Africa, and undertook chaplaincies in Finland, Norway, Switzerland, and New Zealand.

== Notes ==
Church of England titles
Preceded by Ronald Cedric Osbourne Goodchild	Archdeacon of Northampton; 1964–1991	Succeeded by Michael Robin Chapman
