= Colin Docker =

- Bishop of Horsham
- Church: Church of England
- Diocese: Diocese of Chichester
- In office: 1975–1991; Area bishop: 1984–1991
- Predecessor: Simon Phipps
- Successor: John Hind
- Other post: Honorary assistant bishop in Exeter (1991–present)

Personal details
- Born: 3 December 1925
- Died: 4 November 2014 (aged 88)
- Denomination: Anglican
- Parents: Philip Docker & Doris Whitehill
- Spouse: Thelma Upton (m. 1950)
- Children: 1 son; 1 daughter
- Education: University of Birmingham

Ordination history
History
Diaconal ordination
- Date: c. 1949
Priestly ordination
- Date: c. 1950
Episcopal consecration
- Place: Westminster Abbey

Ivor Colin Docker (known as Colin; 3 December 1925 – 4 November 2014) was the 2nd Anglican Bishop of Horsham from 1975 until 1991 and the first area bishop from the area scheme's institution in 1984.

Educated at King Edward's School, Birmingham, Birmingham University (whence he gained a Master of Arts {MA}) and St Catherine's Society, Oxford, he studied for ordination at Wycliffe Hall, Oxford before embarking on an ecclesiastical career with a curacy in Normanton, Yorkshire. From 1954 he was Area Secretary of the CMS and, after spells as Vicar of Midhurst and Seaford he was appointed Rural Dean of Eastbourne in 1971. Four years later he was appointed to become Bishop of Horsham, a suffragan bishop in the Diocese of Chichester; he was consecrated a bishop by Donald Coggan, Archbishop of Canterbury, at Westminster Abbey on 31 January 1975. A keen photographer, he retired to Bovey Tracey in 1991, where he continued to serve the church as an honorary assistant bishop within the Diocese of Exeter.

Church of England titles
Preceded by Simon Phipps	Bishop of Horsham; 1975–1991	Succeeded by John Hind
