= Caister (Retreat Conference) =

Annual Christian revival event in England

Logo of the 2007 Caister event

The Caister Retreat Conference was a residential Christian revival event held in East Anglia, England, shortly after Easter, on an almost annual basis from 1996 to 2008. The tag line of the event was "An initiative of Anglican Bishops to encourage Christians in evangelism and spiritual renewal". It is widely considered to have been a significant movement on the timeline of English Anglo-Catholicism at the turn of the century.

== Origins and background ==
Caister is a generic title for the event, although each year's retreat conference had its own individual name, reflecting the theme of the year, and used extensively in publicity and branding. An annual logo was produced, incorporating the year's particular title, and large banners of the annual logo were made each year by ecclesiastical embroiderer Wendy Oakeshott.

Although the event was organised by members of the Church of England, participants came from Anglican churches throughout the world, and also from Christian churches of other denominations. The event was of a strongly catholic character, but also attracted members of other Anglican traditions, including a strong charismatic element.

The first Caister event was held in 1996, and took the name "The Word is Near". It was held at the Haven Holiday Camp in the village of Caister-on-Sea in Norfolk. Participation was restricted to those who qualified as an ordained bishop, priest, or deacon; or to those who were in training for ordination; or to members of religious communities (monks and nuns). However, from the second year onward (1997) the event was opened up to lay people as well. Attendance varied from year to year, but the retreat conference typically attracted between 500 and 1,000 participants annually.

== List of Caister conferences by year ==
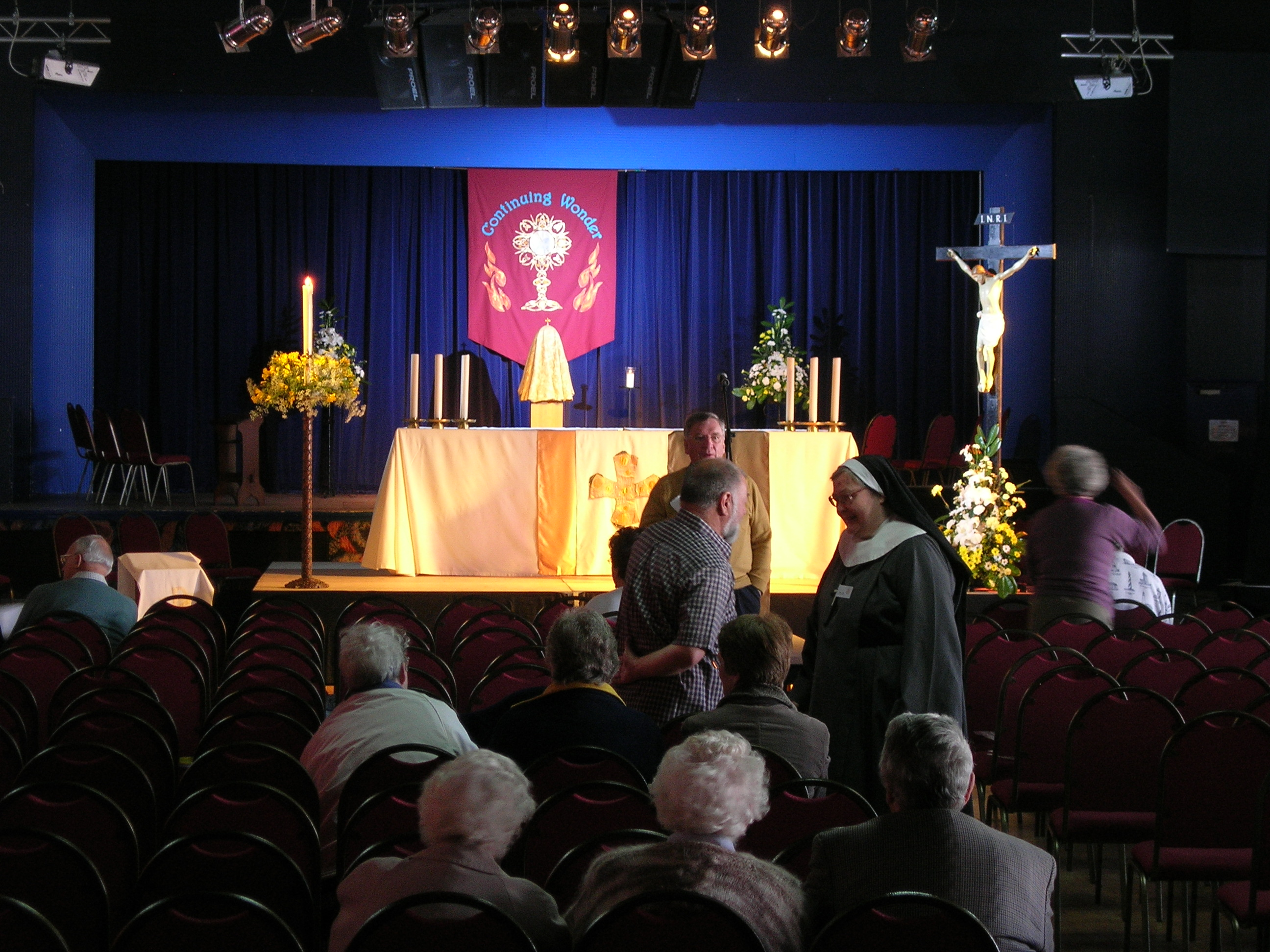
Participants begin to gather for the early evening mass during Caister 2007.

- 1996 - The Word is Near
- 1997 - Stir up the Gift
- 1998 - Sing the Lord's Song
- 1999 - Glory to Glory
- 2001 - The Word's Alive
- 2002 - Speak the Word Only
- 2004 - Love on the Move
- 2005 - Stand Up for Jesus
- 2007 - Continuing Wonder
- 2008 - Resounding Joy

There was no Caister retreat conference in 2000, 2003, or 2006, owing to the lack of availability of accommodation during the week after Easter in these years, the main holiday season having begun at the holiday camps.

== Content of the event ==
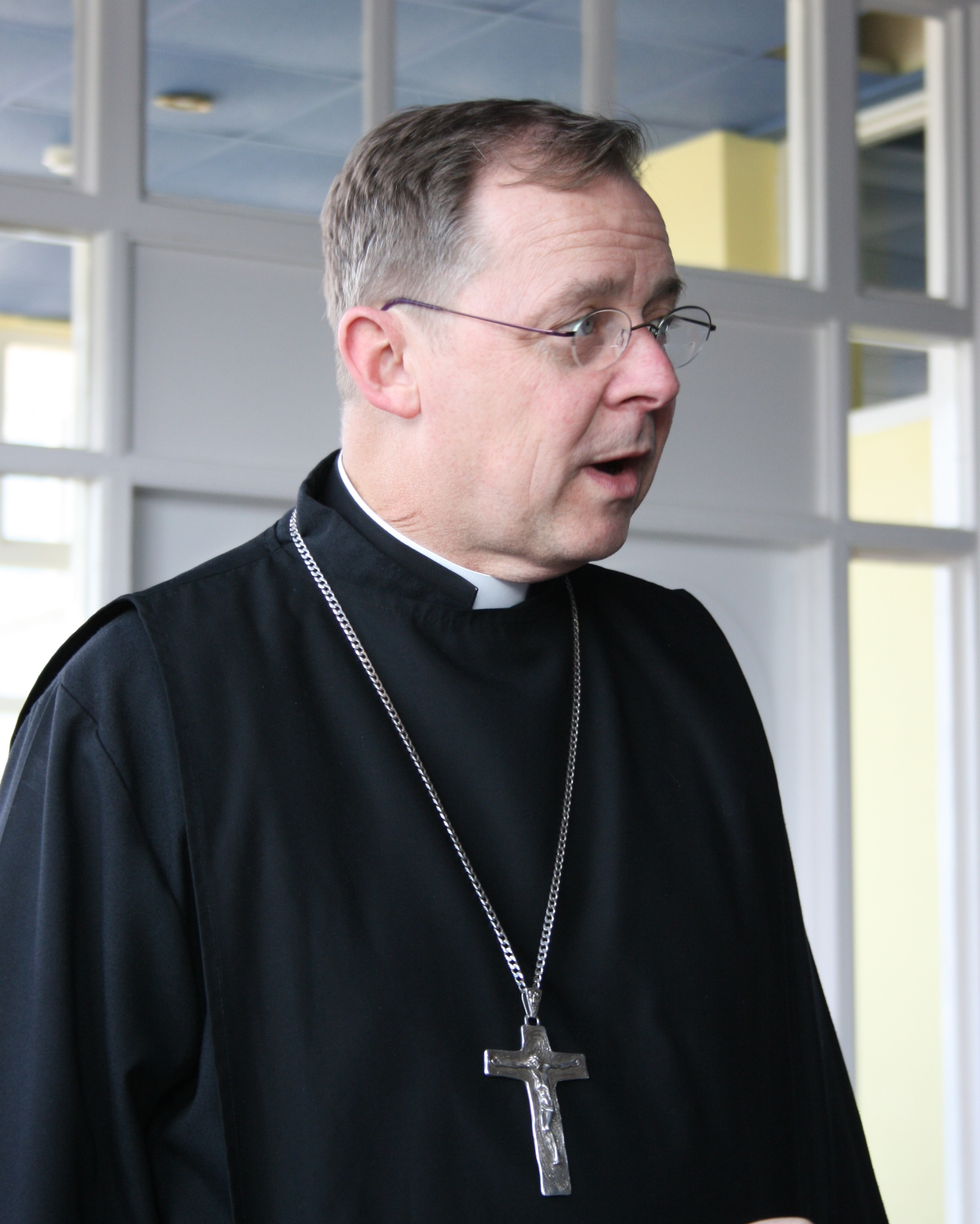
Bishop Lindsay Urwin leading a group session at the final Caister Conference in 2008.

Each Caister retreat conference lasted for one working week, Monday to Friday, usually during 'Low Week' (the week following Easter Week). The daily timetable was always constructed around the same key events: early morning group Bible study, a mid-morning keynote address from a different guest speaker each day, a 'holy hour' at midday (of corporate silence in the presence of the blessed sacrament, concluding with benediction), a series of afternoon optional seminars (with four or five different seminars offered each afternoon), an evening sung mass with a sermon from one of the bishops in attendance, and a late evening special service, whose format varied from day to day throughout the event, but including services of reflection, of reconciliation, of healing, and of praise.

The Bishop of Horsham, Bishop Lindsay Urwin OGS, led at least one of the key teaching elements in every Caister event. The series of events was originally proposed by a meeting of Anglo-Catholic bishops chaired by Eric Kemp, Bishop of Chichester, but Bishop Urwin was the chief proponent and key organiser of the initial Caister conference, and remained one of the principal organisers throughout the whole series of events. In each year Bishop Urwin took the key presentation role, partnered for several years with Brother Angelo SSF, a Franciscan friar, in a light-hearted double act style.

== Caister Taster Days ==
From 2000 onwards a series of 'Caister Taster Days' was organised each year. Led by volunteers from the Caister organisational and liturgical teams, these were one-day conferences in regional centres, designed to reflect the style and spirit of the main Caister event. They had a two-fold function in both acting as a local reunion for regular Caister pilgrims, and also allowing new participants to experience something of the Caister routine with a view to possibly joining the following Easter's main Caister event.

== Event relocation ==
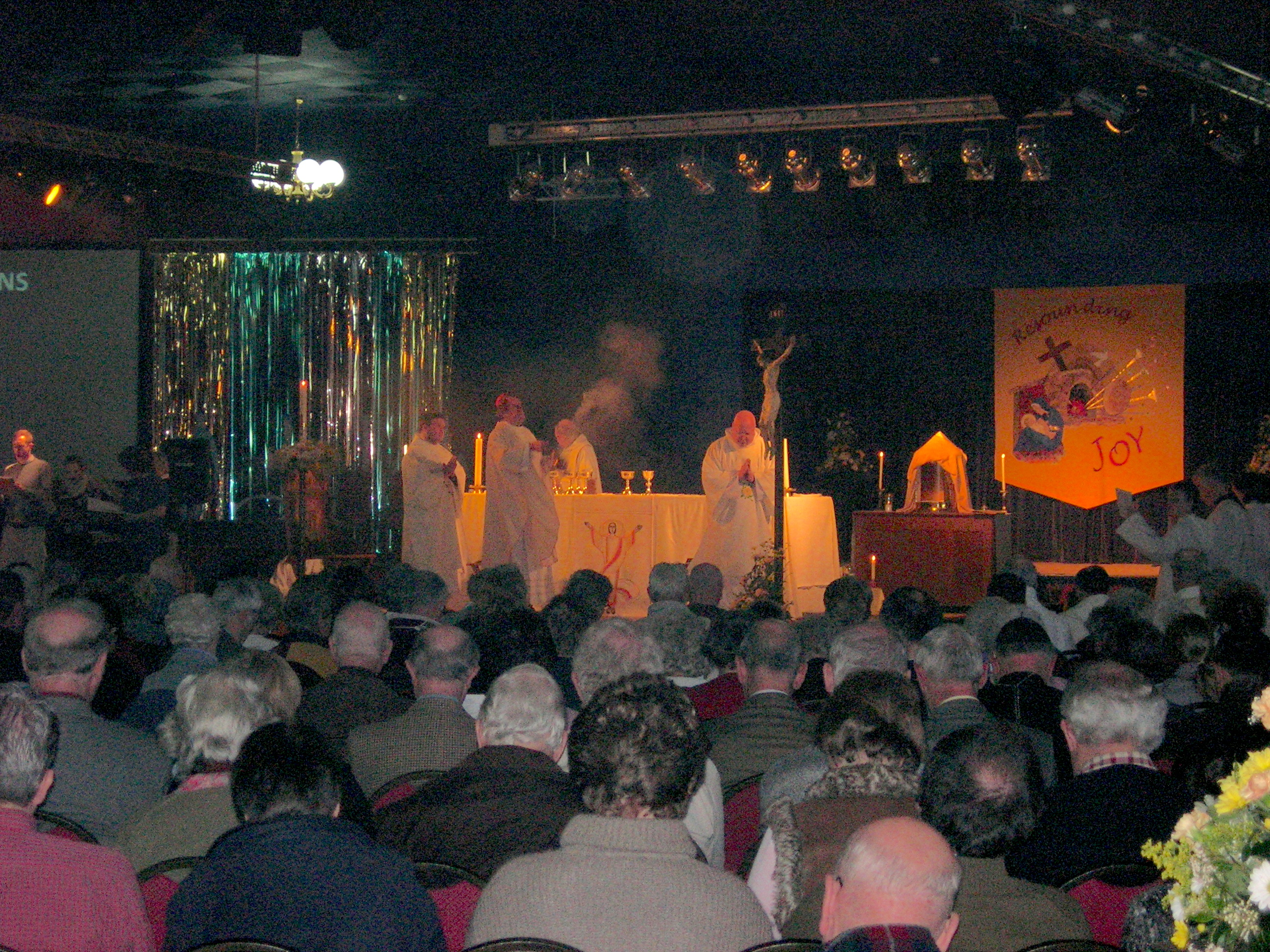
A mass in progress at a relocated Caister Conference in Pakefield.

Following redevelopment of the Caister site by Haven Holidays, the 2007 Caister event had to find a new home. For 2007 and 2008 it was held at Pontins Holiday Camp at Pakefield, in north Suffolk. Despite the change of venue, the event continued to make use of the "Caister" generic title, coupled with an event title for the year. That of 2007 was "Continuing Wonder". Caister 2008 took place from 31 March - 4 April on the theme of 'Resounding Joy', and keynote speakers included Bishop Gordon Mursell (Bishop of Stafford), and Mother Winsome CSMV, amongst others. A dozen active Church of England bishops were present for all or part of the event. The participation of a large number of bishops (never fewer than a dozen in any one year) was always a feature of each Caister conference.

== Sponsorship ==
The Caister event benefited each year from the generous sponsorship of the Confraternity of the Blessed Sacrament (CBS), many of whose members were also participants. The Superior-General of the Confraternity gave an annual address, and admitted new members during the conference.

The events were further sponsored by the Society of the Holy Cross (SSC). All present were invited to an annual address by the Master of the Society, and there was also a private synod of priests of the Society during each conference. David Houlding, the long-serving Master of the Society, has described the Caister Conferences as "a real turning point" in the restoration of the Catholic movement in the Church of England following the divisive period surrounding the debates concerning women's ordination, in the early 1990s.

== Termination ==
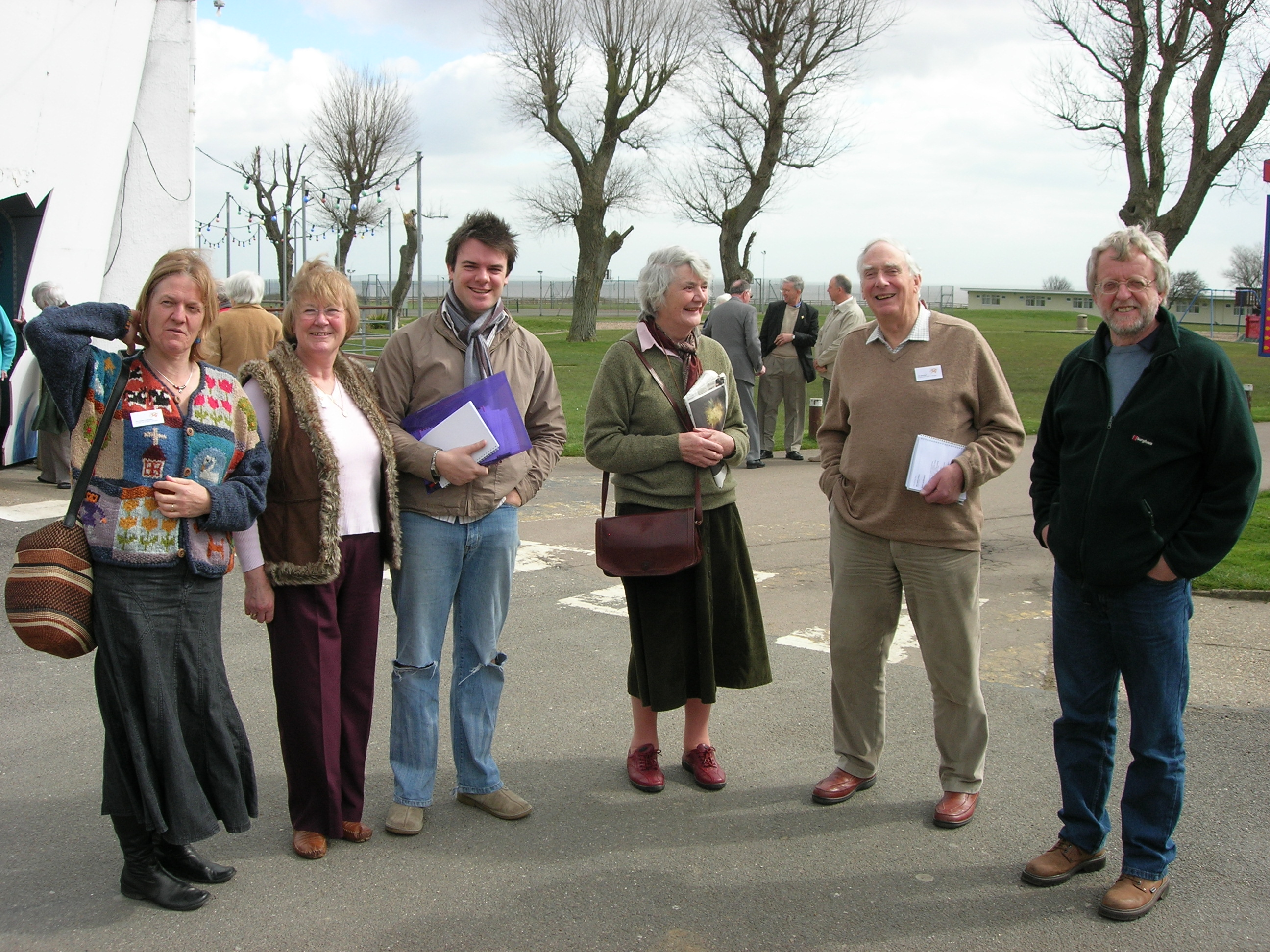
A group of participants in 2008. This turned out to be the final Caister Conference.

Following the 2008 conference Bishop Lindsay Urwin moved from his post as Bishop of Horsham to take up new duties as Administrator of the Shrine of Our Lady of Walsingham, in Norfolk. Having been the principal organiser, the future of the annual conference was first stated to be unclear; it was subsequently announced that there would be no Caister event in 2009. Although no formal announcement was ever made that the series of events had ended, no further conferences were organised, and the Caister Taster Days also ceased in 2010.
