= Church Pastoral Aid Society =

Anglican mission agency

- Abbreviation: CPAS
- Formation: 1836; 189 years ago
- Type: Evangelical Anglicanism; Christian mission
- Chief Executive Officer: Jon Scamman
- Chair of Trustees: The Rt Revd Ruth Bushyager
- Website: Official website

The Church Pastoral Aid Society (CPAS) is an Anglican evangelical mission agency that works across Ireland and the United Kingdom. It was founded in 1836.

== History ==
The CPAS was founded in 1836 in the midst of the social upheaval of the Industrial Revolution to take "the gospel to every man's door, with a single eye to the glory of God". Its founders included the prominent social reformer Lord Shaftesbury.

It initially sought to fulfil its vision by giving grants to poorest parishes to enable them to take on extra help. One early recipient of such a grant was Haworth, which enabled its minister, Patrick Brontë, to employ a curate, Arthur Nicholls, who later married Patrick's daughter, Charlotte. Charlotte summarised and praised the early work of the CPAS in the opening of her 1846 novel Shirley:

Of late years, I say, an abundant shower of curates has fallen upon the north of England, but in eighteen-hundred-eleven-twelve that affluent rain had not descended. Curates were scarce then: there was no Pastoral Aid - no Additional Curates' Society to stretch a helping hand to worn-out old rectors and incumbents, and give them the wherewithal to pay a vigorous young colleague from Oxford or Cambridge.

While the CPAS has since diversified in its methods, which now notably include its holidays for young people, it retains its original vision of "enabl[ing] churches to help every person hear and discover the good news of Jesus Christ."

== Work ==
The CPAS works with churches across Ireland and the United Kingdom. Its aim is to "enable churches to help every person hear and discover the good news of Jesus". Its activities include the Growing Leaders suite of resources, the Arrow Leadership Programme, weekends, and a range of events and resources for youth and children's leaders.

CPAS is responsible for Venture and Falcon holidays, which are holidays for children aged 8 to 18. Falcons are subsidised holidays for young people who might not otherwise be able to go on holiday. CPAS also has responsibility (sole or shared) for around 700 patronages of Anglican churches across the country. It largely proposes evangelical candidates for appointment by bishops.

Ruth Bushyager, the Bishop of Horsham, is the chair of trustees.

There is a head office team who develop and deliver tools, training and resources for churches.

Their records are held at the University of Birmingham Special Collections.

== Controversy ==
In March 2021, the Church Times reported a conflict in 2018 between CPAS and the PCC of St Luke's, West Holloway (a member of Inclusive Church), over the appointment of a new vicar. The PCC representatives could not agree with the patron on which candidates to shortlist, after two rounds of interviews. After a year elapsed, CPAS' right of presentation expired, and eventually the new vicar, John MacKenzie, was appointed by Sarah Mullally, Bishop of London. Joanne Grenfell, Bishop of Stepney, is working to resolve the situation by trying to find another parish with which to do a patronage swap. Neither John Dunnett, CPAS general director, nor Mike Duff, CPAS patronage secretary, commented to the Church Times.

Writing about the system of patronage, Martin Wroe suggested it is "time to disempower some of these hidden hierarchies and place a little more trust in the local".

=== Affirmations on Sexuality ===
Following the proposed introduction of same-sex blessings (Prayers of Love and Faith) by the Church of England, CPAS released an announcement that included a statement titled "Affirmations on Sexuality" (a copy of such a summary made by the Evangelical Alliance). This states, among other things, the following:

- "We affirm that marriage is an institution created by God in which one man and one woman enter into an exclusive relationship for life."
- "We oppose moves within certain churches to accept and/or endorse sexually active same-sex partnerships as a legitimate form of Christian relationship and to permit the ordination to ministry of those in such sexual relationships."
- "We oppose church services of blessing for civil partnerships and other forms of gay and lesbian relationships as unbiblical"

"Affirmations on Sexuality" also included the following paragraph:

We welcome and support the work of those individuals and organisations who responsibly seek to help Christians who experience same-sex attraction as in conflict with their commitment to live in accordance with biblical teaching. This help will involve counsel and pastoral support to live a chaste life and, as part of this process, some may seek and experience changes in the strength or direction of their same-sex attractions.

On 8 January 2024, following criticism, CPAS removed reference to the "Affirmations on Sexuality" from their website and noted that "CPAS is opposed to any form of conversion therapy". A follow up statement clarified that while "our patronage represent a broad family, holding a spectrum of convictions", the intention of the Affirmations was to express that the trustees of CPAS "hold to the doctrine of the Church of England on marriage and sexual ethics" (i.e. that marriage between one man and one woman for life is the only place for sexual activity).
