= Court of Ecclesiastical Causes Reserved =

Court in the Church of England

The Court of Ecclesiastical Causes Reserved is an appellate court within the hierarchy of ecclesiastical courts of the Church of England. Hearing cases involving church doctrine, ceremony, or ritual, the court has jurisdiction over both the Province of Canterbury and the Province of York. Appeals from the court are heard in a Commission of Review.

== Activity ==
The Court of Ecclesiastical Causes Reserved was created in 1963 by the Ecclesiastical Jurisdiction Measure 1963 with appellate jurisdiction in matters of doctrine, ritual or ceremonial.

Complaints against priests or deacons may be vetoed by their bishop and those against a bishop by the appropriate archbishop. Before a case is heard, a preliminary enquiry by a committee decides whether there is a case to answer. In the case of a priest or deacon, the Committee of Inquiry consists of the diocesan bishop, two members of the Lower House of Convocation of the province, and two diocesan chancellors. There are other provisions where the accused is a bishop.

If the committee allows the case to proceed, the Upper House of Convocation appoints a complainant against the accused in the Court for Ecclesiastical Causes Reserved, where the procedure resembles that of an assize court exercising jurisdiction but without a jury. However, the court sits with five advisers chosen from panels of theologians or liturgiologists.

As of 2012, the court has sat in only two cases:

- Re St Michael and All Angels, Great Torrington
- Re St Stephen Walbrook

The first case dealt with the introduction of an icon and candlestick into a church without a faculty (exemption from the usual practice) being granted beforehand. The second case allowed the use of a marble sculpture by Henry Moore as an altar table.

== Composition ==
The court's five judges are appointed by the Sovereign. Two must be judges (or have held high judicial office), and must also be communicant members of the Church of England; the remaining three must be (or have been) diocesan bishops.

In criminal cases there must be not be fewer than three nor more than five advisers, who are selected by the Dean of the Arches and Auditor from a panel of eminent theologians and liturgiologists.

=== Current members ===
The following were appointed to the court by royal warrant under the royal sign manual for a five-year term beginning on 1 December 2021:

- Martin Warner (Bishop of Chichester)
- Rachel Treweek (Bishop of Gloucester)
- Guli Francis-Dehqani (Bishop of Chelmsford)
- Keith Lindblom (a Lord Justice of Appeal)
- Stephen Males (a Lord Justice of Appeal)

=== Former members ===
Name	Position (at time of appointment)	Began	Re-appointed	References
Sir Anthony John Leslie Lloyd		23 October 1984		
Sir Hugh Harry Valentine Forbes		23 October 1984		
Richard Harries		23 October 1984		
Richard David Say		23 October 1984		
Kenneth John Woollcombe	Former Lord Bishop of Oxford	23 October 1984		
Sir Ralph Brian Gibson		10 June 1986	1 February 1992	
Eric Waldram Kemp	Lord Bishop of Chichester	23 October 1984	1 February 1992	
Sir Anthony John Leslie Lloyd			1 February 1992	
Archibald Ronald McDonald Gordon	Lord Bishop of Portsmouth	1 February 1992		
Andrew Alexander Kenny Graham	Lord Bishop of Newcastle	1 February 1992		
The Baroness Butler-Sloss	Former President of the Family Division	1 July 2006		
The Lord Harries of Pentregarth	Former Lord Bishop of Oxford	1 July 2006		
Sir John Frank Mummery	Lord Justice of Appeal	1 July 2006		
The Lord Hope of Thornes	Former Archbishop of York	1 July 2006		
Nicholas Thomas Wright	Lord Bishop of Durham	1 July 2006		
Christopher John Cocksworth	Lord Bishop of Coventry	1 July 2015		
Sir Christopher Simon Courtenay Stephenson Clarke	Justice of the High Court of Justice	1 July 2015		
Lord Hughes of Ombersley	Justice of the Supreme Court	1 July 2015		
David Stuart Walker	Lord Bishop of Manchester	1 July 2015		
Martin Clive Warner	Lord Bishop of Chichester	1 July 2015		
