= John Satterthwaite =

English bishop (1925–2014)

The Right Reverend John Satterthwaite
- Bishop in Europe
- Church: Church of England
- Diocese: Diocese in Europe
- In office: 1980–1993
- Predecessor: Himself (as Bishop of Fulham and Gibraltar)
- Successor: John Hind
- Other posts: Bishop of Fulham and Gibraltar; 1970–1980

Orders
- Consecration: c. 1970

Personal details
- Born: 17 November 1925
- Died: 23 May 2014 (aged 88)
- Denomination: Anglican
- Education: University of Leeds

John Richard Satterthwaite (17 November 1925 – 23 May 2014) was an English bishop in the Church of England. He was Bishop of Gibraltar and at the same time Bishop of Fulham (the suffragan bishop charged by the Bishop of London with the oversight of Anglican congregations in Northern and Central Europe), during which appointments he was called "Bishop of Fulham and Gibraltar". In 1980, when the new Diocese in Europe was created from the union of those two jurisdictions, he became Bishop in Europe ("Bishop of Gibraltar in Europe" in full) for the last third of the 20th century.

Satterthwaite was educated at the University of Leeds and the College of the Resurrection, Mirfield. He was ordained a deacon at Michaelmas 1950 (1 October) at St George's Church, Barrow-in-Furness and a priest the following Michaelmas (23 September 1951) at Carlisle Cathedral — both times by Thomas Bloomer, Bishop of Carlisle. He began his ordained ministry with curacies at St Barnabas's Carlisle and St Michael Paternoster Royal in the City of London, after which he was Vicar of St Dunstan-in-the-West before being ordained to the episcopate. He was consecrated a bishop on 28 October 1970, by Michael Ramsey, Archbishop of Canterbury (with ecumenical assistance), at Westminster Abbey; and died on 23 May 2014.
