= Peter Allan (priest) =

British Anglican priest and monk

The Reverend Peter Allan
- Former Principal of the College of the Resurrection
- Church: Church of England
- Diocese: Leeds
- In office: 2011–2019
- Predecessor: Joseph Kennedy
- Successor: Mark Sowerby
- Previous post: Monk of the Community of the Resurrection (1985–2024)

Orders
- Ordination: 1975 (deacon); 1976 (priest)

Personal details
- Born: 1950 (age 75–76)
- Denomination: Anglicanism
- Education: Wadham College, Oxford; College of the Resurrection

Peter George Allan (born 1950) is a British Anglican priest and monk. From 2011 to 2019, he was principal of the College of the Resurrection, an Anglo-Catholic theological college in Mirfield, West Yorkshire, England. He was a monk of the Community of the Resurrection between 1985 and 2024.

== Early life and education ==
Allan was born in 1950. He studied music at Wadham College, Oxford, graduating with a Bachelor of Arts (BA) degree in 1972: as per tradition, his BA was promoted to a Master of Arts (MA Oxon) degree in 1976. In 1972, he matriculated into the College of the Resurrection, Mirfield, to study theology and train for ordination. He left the college after three years to be ordained in the Church of England.

== Ordained ministry ==
Allan was ordained in the Church of England as a deacon in 1975 and as a priest in 1976. From 1975 to 1978, he served his curacy at St Andrew's Church, Stevenage, an Anglo-Catholic parish in the Diocese of St Albans. Then, from 1978 to 1982, he was chaplain of Wadham College, Oxford, and a curate of the University Church of St Mary the Virgin, Oxford.

In 1982, Allan joined the Community of the Resurrection as a novice. In 1985, he made his vows, thereby becoming a monk and a full member of the Community of the Resurrection. From 1985, he was the precentor of the community. In 2011, he was also appointed principal of the College of the Resurrection, an Anglo-Catholic theological college that is associated with the Community of the Resurrection. He was also a lecturer in moral theology and liturgical music at the college. He stepped down as principal at the end of the 2018/2019 academic year and was succeeded by Mark Sowerby, former Bishop of Horsham. In September 2019, he returned to parish life and became an assistant priest of the Severn Loop Parishes in the Diocese of Lichfield. At a Chapter meeting in July 2024, upon his own request, Allan was released from the Community of the Resurrection, marking his departure from monastic life.

=== Views ===
In January 2016, Allan signed an open letter addressed to the Archbishops of Canterbury and York, asking for "Acknowledgement that we, the Church, have failed in our duty of care to LGBTI members of the Body of Christ around the world" and calling for "Repentance for accepting and promoting discrimination on the grounds of sexuality, and for the pain and rejection that this has caused."

== Selected works ==
- Peter Allan; et al., eds. (1991). An English kyriale: music for the Eucharist. London: Harper Collins. ISBN 978-0005992692.
- Peter Allan; et al., eds. (1993). The Fire and the Clay: The Priest in Today's Church. London: SPCK. ISBN 978-0281047154.
- George Guiver; Peter Allan; et al., eds. (2001). Priests in a People's Church. London: SPCK. ISBN 978-0281054053.
