= Michael Chapman (priest) =

English Anglican priest (1939–2019)

Michael Robin Chapman (29 September 1939 - 15 March 2019) was an English Anglican priest who was the Archdeacon of Northampton from 1991 to his retirement in 2004.

Marsh was educated at Lichfield Cathedral School, Ellesmere College, the University of Leeds and the College of the Resurrection; and ordained deacon in 1963 and priest in 1964. After a curacy in Sunderland he was a Chaplain in the Royal Navy from 1968 until 1984. In that year he became Vicar of St Mark the Evangelist Church, Upper Hale, Farnham, Surrey, and in 1988 its Rural Dean, holding both posts until his appointment as Archdeacon.

He died in 2019, aged 79.

== Notes ==
Church of England titles
Preceded by Bazil Marsh	Archdeacon of Northampton; 1991–2004	Succeeded by Christine Allsopp
