= John Grimes (priest) =

(Cecil) John Grimes (1881–1976) was Archdeacon of Northampton from 1941 to 1959 and a resident canon of Peterborough Cathedral.

He was born at Stratford-on-Avon and educated at London University. Initially a civil engineer, he was ordained to the priesthood after a studying at Ripon College Cuddesdon in 1912. After a curacy at St Giles’, Reading he was a chaplain with the Indian Ecclesiastical Establishment in Bengal from 1915 to 1924. He was vicar of St Matthew's, Westminster from 1924 to 1925 and then Archdeacon of Calcutta until 1933. He was a vicar of St John the Baptist, Peterborough until 1938, then a rector of Thorpe Malsor until his appointment as an archdeacon.

He died on 19 November 1976.

== Notes ==
Church of England titles
Preceded by Walter Kelly Firminger	Archdeacon of Calcutta; 1926 – 1933	Succeeded by Ormonde Winstanley Birch
Preceded by Carey Frederick Knyvett	Archdeacon of Northampton; 1941 – 1959	Succeeded by Ronald Cedric Osbourne Goodchild
