= Owen Davys =

Owen Davys (25 May 1794 – 7 February 1875) was Archdeacon of Northampton from 1842 until his death.

Davys was born in Loughborough, and was educated at Uppingham School and St John's College, Cambridge. He was ordained in 1818. He held incumbencies at Humberstone, Cranwell, Rauceby and Fiskerton. He died in Peterborough, aged 80.

== Notes ==
Church of England titles
Preceded by William Strong	Archdeacon of Northampton; 1842–1875	Succeeded by Francis Thicknesse
