= Christine Allsopp =

Anglican archdeacon

Christine Allsopp is an Anglican priest who was Archdeacon of Northampton from 2005 to 2013.

Born on 19 January 1947 she was educated at St Albans Grammar School for Girls and the University of Aston. A former research chemist, she was ordained deacon in 1989 and priest in 1994. After a curacy at Caversham she was Vicar of Bracknell and then Rural Dean of Alderbury before her collation as Archdeacon.

She retired in September, 2013 and since then has been archdeacon emeritus.

== Notes ==
Church of England titles
Preceded by Michael Robin Chapman	Archdeacon of Northampton; 2005–2013	Succeeded by Richard Ormston
