= Martin Lloyd Williams =

Archdeacon of Brighton and Lewes (born 1965)

Martin Clifford Lloyd Williams (born 12 May 1965) was licensed as the first Archdeacon of Brighton and Lewes in the Church of England's Diocese of Chichester on 1 March 2015.

Lloyd Williams was educated at Westminster College and Trinity College, Bristol. He was ordained in 1994 and spent many years in Bath (Curate, St Andrew; Rector, St Michael; Rural Dean) before his appointment as Archdeacon.
