= William Strong (archdeacon of Northampton) =

William Strong (13 February 1756 Peterborough - 8 September 1842 Stanground) was Archdeacon of Northampton from 1797 until his death.

Strong was educated at Charterhouse and Queens' College, Cambridge; and ordained in 1781. He held incumbencies at Bolingbroke with Hareby and Billinghay; and was also an Honorary Chaplain to the King.

== Notes ==
Church of England titles
Preceded by William Brown	Archdeacon of Northampton; 1797–1842	Succeeded by Owen Davys
