= Ruth Bushyager =

British Anglican bishop (born 1977)

The Right Reverend Ruth Bushyager
- Bishop of Horsham
- Church: Church of England
- Province: Canterbury
- Diocese: Chichester
- Predecessor: Mark Sowerby

Orders
- Ordination: 2005 (deacon); 2006 (priest)
- Consecration: 15 July 2020 by Sarah Mullally

Personal details
- Born: Ruth Kathleen Frances Twitchen; March 1977 (age 49)
- Denomination: Anglican
- Education: University of Bristol; Wycliffe Hall, Oxford

Ruth Kathleen Frances Bushyager (née Twitchen; born March 1977) is a British Anglican bishop. Since July 2020, she has served as Bishop of Horsham, a suffragan bishop in the Diocese of Chichester.

== Early life and education ==
Bushyager was born in March 1977 in Essex, England. She studied at the University of Bristol, graduating with a Master of Science (MSci) degree in 1999. From 2000 to 2004, she was a policy adviser at the Cabinet Office. She then entered Wycliffe Hall, Oxford, an evangelical Anglican theological college to train for ordination. She graduated from the University of Oxford with a Bachelor of Arts (BA) in theology in 2004. She then undertook a further year of training, completing a diploma in Christian ministry, before leaving theological college to be ordained in 2005.

== Ordained ministry ==
Bushyager was ordained in the Church of England as a deacon in 2005 and as a priest in 2006. From 2014 to 2020, she was Vicar of St Paul's Church, Dorking in the Diocese of Guildford. She previously served in parish ministry in the Dioceses of Southwell and Nottingham and of Oxford, as a school chaplain, and as a missioner in the Diocese of London.

=== Episcopal ministry ===
In April 2020, Bushyager was announced as the next Bishop of Horsham, a suffragan bishop in the Diocese of Chichester. She is the first woman to serve as a bishop in the diocese. Her consecration as a bishop took place on the morning of 15 July 2020, in the Chapel of Lambeth Palace. The principal consecrator was Sarah Mullally, Bishop of London, making her the first female bishop in the Church of England to be consecrated by a bishop who is female.

She is chair of the trustees of Church Pastoral Aid Society (CPAS), an Anglican evangelical mission agency.

=== Views ===
In 2025 in a letter published in the Spectator on 18 October, Ruth Bushyager wrote in defence of the 5 Guiding Principles of the Church of England, saying "This was not a compromise but a settlement – one that enabled the majority to proceed with change while ensuring others were not forced to leave. The vision is one of mutual flourishing: not the quiet strangulation of a minority, but the creation of legal and pastoral provision for both convictions to flourish." In 2024 Ruth Bushyager signed an open letter published in the Telegraph stating that The Private Member’s Bill on assisted dying introduced to the House of Commons on Wednesday 16 October presents "a dangerous threat to our society. The Christian faith offers a defence of the dignity of life and a call to improve the quality of life for all those living including those who are dying" and arguing that reducing the value of human life to physical and mental capacity has "sinister implications" and pointing to examples in other countries where the scope of assisted dying has widened over time. In 2023, following the news that the House of Bishop's of the Church of England was to introduce proposals for blessing same-sex relationships, she signed an open letter which stated:

many Christians in the Church of England and the Anglican Communion, together with Christians from across the churches of world Christianity, continue to believe that marriage is given by God for the union of a man and woman and that it cannot be extended to those who are of the same sex. [...] Without seeking to diminish the value of many committed same-sex relationships, for which there is much to give thanks, we find ourselves constrained by what we sincerely believe the Scriptures teach which cannot be set aside.
