= Richard Ormston =

Anglican archdeacon (born 1961)

Richard Jeremy Ormston (born 17 November 1961) has been Archdeacon of Northampton since 2014.

Born in 1961, Ormston was educated at Oak Hill Theological College and ordained deacon in 1987 and priest in 1988. After a curacy at St Mary, Rodbourne Cheney, he was Rector of Collingtree with Courteenhall and Milton Malsor from 1991 to 2001 (and Rural Dean of Wootton from 1996 to 2001); then Rector of St Peter, Oundle from 2001 until his appointment as Archdeacon of Northampton. He was also Rural Dean of Oundle and an honorary canon of Peterborough Cathedral from 2003 until 2013. He was additionally Acting Archdeacon of Oakham, 1 December 2021 – 6 February 2022 and, briefly, Rural Dean of Towcester.

Church of England titles
Preceded by Christine Allsopp	Archdeacon of Northampton; 2014–present	Incumbent
