= Mark Sowerby =

British Anglican bishop (born 1963)

The Right Reverend Mark Sowerby
- Principal of the College of the Resurrection, Mirfield
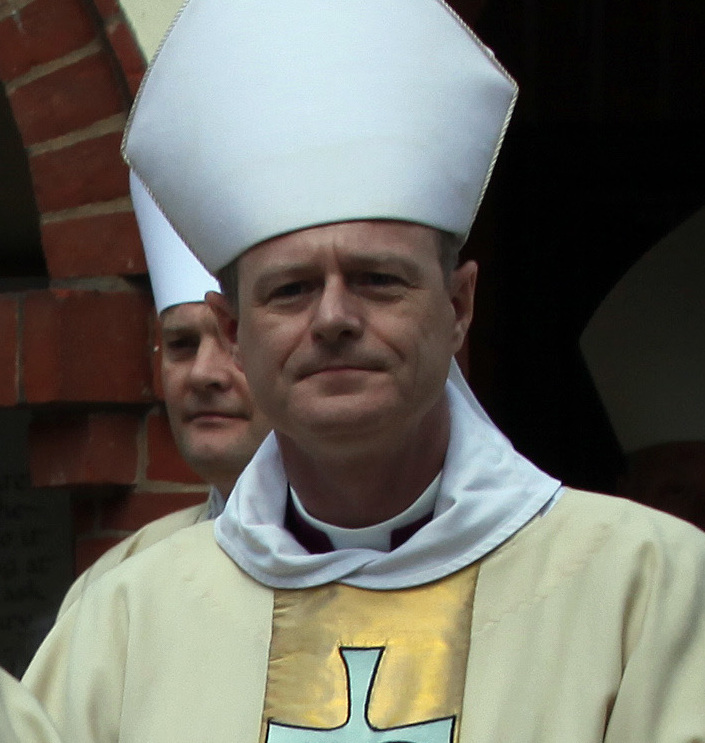
- Bishop Sowerby in 2012
- In office: 2019–present
- Predecessor: Peter Allan
- Other post: Bishop of Horsham (2009–2019)

Orders
- Ordination: 28 June 1987 (deacon) by David Young; 3 July 1988 (priest) by Malcolm Menin
- Consecration: 25 July 2009 by Rowan Williams

Personal details
- Born: 28 October 1963 (age 63) Ripon, West Riding of Yorkshire, United Kingdom
- Denomination: Anglican
- Residence: Bishop's House, Horsham
- Parents: Geoffrey (priest)
- Spouse: (m. 1989)
- Children: three
- Education: King's College London

Mark Crispin Rake Sowerby (born 28 October 1963) is a British Anglican bishop. Since 2019, he has been the Principal of the College of the Resurrection, Mirfield; he was previously Bishop of Horsham, a suffragan bishop (formerly an area bishop) in the Diocese of Chichester.

== Early life ==
Sowerby was born on 28 October 1963 in Ripon, West Riding of Yorkshire. His father, Geoffrey (a priest), was a minor canon of Ripon Minster. He was educated at Barnard Castle School, then a direct grant grammar school in Barnard Castle, County Durham, and at St Aidan's and St John Fisher Associated Sixth Form, an ecumenical sixth form college in Harrogate, North Yorkshire. He studied theology at King's College, London, and graduated in 1985, with a Bachelor of Divinity (BD) degree and the Associateship of King's College (AKC). He then entered the College of the Resurrection, Mirfield, an Anglo-Catholic theological college, to train for the priesthood. He left the college in 1987 to be ordained.

== Ordained ministry ==
Sowerby was made a deacon in the Church of England at Petertide (28 June) 1987 by David Young, Bishop of Ripon, during a service at Ripon Cathedral. He was ordained a priest the Petertide following (3 July 1988) by Malcolm Menin, Bishop of Knaresborough. His first posts were curacies at Knaresborough and Darwen after which he was Vicar of Accrington then Vocations Officer and Selection Secretary in The Ministry Division.

His last post before his appointment to the episcopate was Team Rector of St Wilfrid's Church, Harrogate. One of his final acts as rector was to welcome a proposal from NEDL to erect a primary electricity station in the curtilage of the church. This proposal, generated criticism from, amongst others, the Victorian Society, Private Eye magazine and residents of Harrogate.

=== Episcopal ministry ===
Appointed to become Bishop of Horsham – one of two suffragan bishops of the Diocese of Chichester – in 2009, Sowerby was ordained and consecrated a bishop by Rowan Williams, Archbishop of Canterbury, at Chichester Cathedral on 25 July 2009. At first, his post was as an area bishop, but the area scheme was wound up in 2013 and he remained a non-area suffragan. During a protracted investigation – while there was a vacancy in the diocesan see – into the efficacy of safeguarding practices in the diocese, Sowerby was additionally Acting Bishop of Chichester. (The senior suffragan of the diocese, Wallace Benn, Bishop of Lewes, was involved in the ongoing investigation.)

On 30 April 2019, it was announced that Sowerby would be the next Principal of the College of the Resurrection, an Anglo-Catholic theological college in West Yorkshire and his alma mater. He succeeded Peter Allan CR, who retired at the end of the 2018–2019 academic year; Sowerby resigned his see effective 31 August 2019. Since 2019, he has also been licensed an honorary assistant bishop of the Diocese of Leeds (in which Mirfield is situate).

=== Views ===
Sowerby previously held views consistent with traditionalist Anglo-Catholicism, such as rejecting the ordination of women as priests or bishops. In June 2015, he announced that he had changed his theological outlook and now accepts the ordination of women as priests and bishops. Consequently, he resigned from the Council of Bishops of The Society, a traditionalist Anglo-Catholic association in the Church of England.

== Personal life ==
Sowerby married in 1989 and has three children.

== Styles ==
- The Reverend Mark Sowerby (1988–2009)
- The Right Reverend Mark Sowerby (2009–present)

Church of England titles
Preceded by Lindsay Urwin	Bishop of Horsham; 2009–2019	Succeeded by Ruth Bushyager
