= Richard Butler (English priest) =

Archdeacon of Northampton, England

Richard Butler (died 14 September 1612) was Archdeacon of Northampton from 9 July 1611 until his death. Butler was among the earliest Arminians, along with John Buckeridge (his predecessor), Benjamin Carier, and Richard Neile.

Butler was educated at St John's College, Cambridge. He was ordained deacon and priest in 1588 at Peterborough. He held incumbencies at Spratton (starting 1591) and Ashton-in-the-Wall (starting 1602).

Butler attended the Hampton Court Conference of 1604, where he famously described Puritans as being Prostestants "frayed out of [their] wits". He received his Doctor of Divinity in 1608, on the same day as William Laud. Butler assisted Neile in the examination of Edward Wightman, who was the last person to be burned at the stake in England for heresy. Butler was one of the founding benefactors of St John's College, Oxford, to which he bequeathed certain medieval manuscripts, including Richard Rolle's Parce mihi.

Church of England titles
Preceded by John Buckeridge	Archdeacon of Northampton; 1707–1737	Succeeded by Thomas Dove
