= Archdeacon of Northampton =

Church of England ecclesiastical office

The Archdeacon of Northampton is a senior ecclesiastical officer within the Diocese of Peterborough. As such she or he is responsible for the disciplinary supervision of the clergy within its six rural deaneries: Brackley, Brixworth, Daventry, Greater Northampton, Towcester and Wellingborough. The incumbent is Richard Ormston, who took up his position in February 2014.

== History ==
This is a list of archdeacons of Northampton, historically a post in the Diocese of Lincoln, and then in the Diocese of Peterborough from that diocese's creation on 4 September 1541.

== List of archdeacons ==
=== High Medieval ===
- bef. 1092–bef. 1123: Nigel (first archdeacon)
- bef. 1123–aft. 1132: Robert
- bef. 1133–9 February 1169 (d.): William
- bef. 1174–1175: Herbert Poore
- 1175–aft. 1187: Savaric FitzGeldewin
- bef. 1194–aft. 1198: Wimar (Winemer)
- bef. 1200–aft. 1203: Richard of Kent
- bef. 1206–aft. 1231: Robert de Manecestre (i.e. of Manchester)
- bef. 1231–1246 (d.): John de Houton
- bef. 1247–20 November 1272 (d.): Giles le Rous (Rufus)
- bef. 1273–1280 (res.): Richard Gravesend
- bef. 1280–bef. 1291 (d.): Stephen of Sutton
- 9 January 1291–bef. 1316 (d.): Thomas of Sutton

=== Late Medieval ===
- 8 June 1316–bef. 1331 (d.): Gilbert Middleton
- Opposed (ineffectually) by claimants:
  - 1317 (d.): Thomas Grandison
  - 1317: Gauscelin Cardinal de Jean (Cardinal-priest of Santi Marcellino e Pietro)
- 6 January–1 March 1331 (disp.): Richard Bury d'Aungerville (displaced)
- 1 March 1331 – 14 April 1335 (d.): Peter Cardinal de Mortemart (Cardinal-priest of Santo Stefano al Monte Celio)
- 15 September 1335 – 20 November 1348 (d.): John Raymond Cardinal de Comminges (Cardinal-bishop of Porto)
- 1349–bef. 1351 (res.): Roger Neucroft
- ?–bef. 1351 (res.): John Gynwell
- 27 February 1351 – 1363 (res.): John Bokyngham
- 26 April–23 May 1363 (res.): William of Wykeham
- 14 June 1363 – 1371/2 (d.): William Askeby/Scoter
- 21 December 1371 – 1373 (res.): Henry Wakefield (elected Bishop of Ely, but set aside)
- bef. 1374–April 1379 (d.): Henry Piel
- bef. 1381–aft. 1381: Walter Skirlaw
- 23 February–March 1386 (res.): Henry Bowet
- 23 March 1386–bef. 1402 (d.): Thomas Butiller
- 14 July 1402–bef. 1403 (res.): Thomas Bekingham
- 4 June 1403 – 1413 (res.): Richard Courtenay
- The Bishop of Rome (then Pope Gregory XII) reserved the archdeaconry for John Bremor in 1413, but Bremor evidently did not obtain possession.
- 6 April 1413–?: John Stone
- 10 July 1419 – 1431 (res.): Robert FitzHugh
- 4 August 1431 – 9 April 1434 (d.): Ardicino Cardinal della Porta (seniore) (Cardinal-deacon of Santi Cosma e Damiano)
- 16 May 1434 – 1454 (res.): William Grey
- 17 August 1454–bef. 1457 (res.): George Neville
- 19 August 1457 – 1464 (res.): John Chadworth
- 23 August 1464–bef. 1468 (d.): William Say
- 27 November 1468 – 1471 (res.): John Rudying
- 6 August 1471–bef. 1482 (d.): John Collinson
- 24 March 1482–bef. 1500 (d.): Peter Huse or Busy
- 4 January 1500 – 1506 (res.): William Smith
- 26 August 1506–bef. 1548 (res.): Gilbert Smith

=== Early modern ===
On 4 September 1541, Northampton archdeaconry became part of the new Diocese of Peterborough.

- 28 May 1548–March 1549 (d.): John Apharry (ap Harry, Parry)
- 30 March 1549 – 1554 (res.): William Geffre
- bef. 1558–bef. 1571 (d.): William Binsley
- bef. 1579–bef. 1587 (d.): Nicholas Sheppard
- 12 November 1587–April 1598 (d.): James Howland
- bef. 1598–bef. 1604 (res.): William Bayly
- 23 March 1604 – 1611 (res.): John Buckeridge
- 9 July 1611–bef. 1612 (d.): Richard Butler
- 26 September 1612 – 24 July 1629 (d.): Thomas Dove, yr
- 31 July 1629–bef. 1665 (d.): John Quarles
- 25 October 1665 – 9 December 1679 (d.): John Palmer
- 4 January 1680 – 29 November 1707 (d.): Thomas Wolsey
- 12 December 1707 – 24 December 1737 (d.): Richard Cumberland
- 13 January 1738 – 7 August 1764 (d.): John Browne
- 6 September 1764 – 17 November 1797 (d.): William Brown
- 1 December 1797 – 8 September 1842 (d.): William Strong
- 15 September 1842 – 7 February 1875 (d.): Owen Davys

=== Late modern ===
- 1875–1911 (res.): Francis Thicknesse (also Bishop suffragan of Leicester, 1888–1902)
- 1911–1919 (res.): Holden Hutton
- 1919–1936 (res.): Norman Lang (also Bishop suffragan of Leicester until 1927; Assistant Bishop of Peterborough thereafter)
- 1936–1941 (res.): Carey Knyvett
- 1941–1959 (ret.): John Grimes (afterwards archdeacon emeritus)
- 1959–1964 (res.): Ronald Goodchild
- 1964–1991 (ret.): Bazil Marsh (afterwards archdeacon emeritus)
- 1991–2004 (ret.): Michael Chapman
- 2005–2013 (ret.): Christine Allsopp (afterwards archdeacon emeritus)
- 2014–present: Richard Ormston

== Sources ==
- Greenaway, Diana E. (1977), Fasti Ecclesiae Anglicanae 1066–1300, vol. 3, pp. 30–32
- King, H.P.F. (1962), Fasti Ecclesiae Anglicanae 1300–1541, vol. 1, pp. 10–12
- Horn, Joyce M.; Smith, David M. (1999), Fasti Ecclesiae Anglicanae 1541–1857, vol. 9, p. 20
- Horn, Joyce M. (1996), Fasti Ecclesiae Anglicanae 1541–1857, vol. 8, pp. 122–123
