= John Browne (academic) =

John Browne (1687–1764) was an Oxford academic and administrator. He was Fellow and Master of University College, Oxford, and also served as vice-chancellor of Oxford University.

== Biography ==
John Browne was the sixth son of Richard Browne of Marton, Yorkshire. On 23 May 1704, he matriculated as a student at University College, Oxford, and was then elected as a Browne Exhibitioner on 16 November 1705. On 27 October 1708, he was elected to be a Freeston Minor Exhibitioner and later on 23 August 1711 he was elected as a Skirlaw Fellow.

After being a student at University College, Browne was a Fellow at the College from 1711 to 1739. He served in a number of duties for the College, such as Dean, Praelector in Greek, and Registrar. He was also tutor to a number of students. In around 1714, Browne took on the living of Long Compton, Warwickshire.In 1738, Browne became Archdeacon of Northampton. In 1743, he became a Canon of Peterborough Cathedral. From 1745, he was Master of University College.

In 1753, as Vice-Chancellor of Oxford University, Browne chose the design for the Oxford Almanack. This included King Alfred, the supposed founder of University College at the time, in front of the Radcliffe Quad, University College's second quadrangle.

Browne bequeathed his books to the Master of University College and his successors. The library was originally located in a ground-floor room in the Radcliffe Quad of the College. However, when a new Master's Lodgings was built, the books were moved there. They form a decorative backdrop in the dining room, in fitted bookcases.

John Browne died on 7 August 1764.

Church of England titles
Preceded by Richard Cumberland	Archdeacon of Northampton; 1738–1764	Succeeded by William Brown
Academic offices
Preceded by Thomas Cockman	Master of University College, Oxford; 1745–1764	Succeeded by Nathan Wetherell
Preceded by John Purnell	Vice-Chancellor of Oxford University; 1750–1753	Succeeded by George Huddesford
