= Thomas Butiller =

English priest

Thomas Butiller was an English priest in the late 14th and early 15th centuries.

Butiller is first mentioned as Rector of Buriton in Hampshire in 1373, a post he held until 1382. The next year he became Archdeacon of Salisbury, but exchanged the next year with William Potyn for the parish of Lyminge in Kent. That benefice was exchanged a year later for the Prebendal Stall of Sidlesham in Sussex, which he held until 1389.

He was Archdeacon of Northampton from 1386 to 1402. He was a Canon (12th Stall) at Windsor from 1387 to 1389 and Dean from 1389 to 1402. One of his duties at Windsor was to supervise the swan-upping. He was Prebendary of Leighton Buzzard at Lincoln Cathedral from 1389 to 1391; and of Colworth at Chichester Cathedral from 1389 to 1402. He was put forward for a Canonry at Canterbury, but was not admitted. His last appointment was at Brightling in Sussex.
