= John Apharry =

English priest

John Apharry was an English priest in the 16th century.

Apharry was educated at the University of Oxford, where a John ap Harry or Parry is listed as the principal of Broadgate's Hall and where he graduated as Legum Doctor. He held livings at Church Eaton, Castor and Blymhill. He was Archdeacon of Northampton from 1548 until his death in 1549.
