= William Brown (priest) =

William Brown, DD (b Grantham 23 October 1710 - d Horbling 17 November 1797) was Archdeacon of Northampton from 1764 until 1797.

Brown was educated at Queens' College, Cambridge and ordained in 1740. He held incumbencies at Marston Trussell, Etton, Alwalton and Peakirk.

== Notes ==
Church of England titles
Preceded by John Browne	Archdeacon of Northampton; 1764–1797	Succeeded by William Strong
