= Simon Phipps (bishop) =

British Anglican bishop (1921–2001)

The Right Reverend Simon Phipps MC
- Bishop of Lincoln
- Church: Church of England
- Diocese: Diocese of Lincoln
- In office: 1974–1987
- Predecessor: Kenneth Riches
- Successor: Robert M. Hardy
- Other post: Bishop of Horsham

Orders
- Consecration: 1968

Personal details
- Born: 6 July 1921
- Died: 29 January 2001 (aged 79)
- Denomination: Anglican
- Parents: William & Pamela
- Spouse: Mary Welch (m. 1973)
- Education: Trinity College, Cambridge

Simon Wilton Phipps MC (1921–2001) was a British Anglican bishop, who served as Bishop of Lincoln between 1974 and 1987.

== Life ==
He was born on 6 July 1921, the son of Captain William Duncan Phipps R.N. and Pamela Ross, and was educated at Eton and Trinity College, Cambridge.

In 1940, he was commissioned into the Coldstream Guards. He fought both in North Africa, where he was wounded, and in Italy. On 19 April 1945, in the Allied advance to the River Po, he was again wounded during a reconnaissance mission and was subsequently awarded the Military Cross (MC). He reached the rank of major, before being demobilised in 1946.

Following the war, having read History at Trinity, he studied for the priesthood at Westcott House, Cambridge. A talented writer of lyrics, he was President of Footlights in 1949.

In 1953, after a short spell as a curate in Huddersfield, Phipps was appointed Chaplain at Trinity. That appointment was followed by ten years at Coventry as an Industrial Chaplain, during which time he lived in a small council flat on a new housing estate.

The modesty of his surroundings did not prevent him from entertaining his long-time friend, Princess Margaret, "to the great interest of his neighbours".

In 1968, Phipps was appointed as Suffragan Bishop of Horsham. In 1974 he was translated to Lincoln in 1974, where he served as Bishop until 1987.

== Marriage and death ==
In 1973, he married Mary Welch, who died in 2000. They had no children. Phipps died in January 2001.

== Sources ==
- Caroline Gilmour and Patricia Wyndham, Simon Phipps: A Portrait (Continuum, 2003)
- "The Right Reverend Simon Phipps". The Telegraph. 7 February 2001. Archived from the original on 4 June 2011.

Church of England titles
| New title | Bishop of Horsham; 1968–1974 | Succeeded by Colin Docker |
| Preceded by Kenneth Riches | Bishop of Lincoln; 1974–1987 | Succeeded by Robert Maynard Hardy |
