= Richard Cumberland (priest) =

Richard Cumberland was Archdeacon of Northampton from 1707 until 1737.

He was the son of Richard Cumberland, an English philosopher and Bishop of Peterborough from 1691 to 1718. Cumberland was born in Peterborough and educated at Queens' College, Cambridge. He held incumbencies at Elton and Peakirk; and was a Prebendary of Peterborough and Lincoln.

He died on 24 December 1737.

== Notes ==
Church of England titles
Preceded by Thomas Wolsey	Archdeacon of Northampton; 1707–1737	Succeeded by John Browne
