= Eric Kemp =

Bishop of Chichester from 1974 to 2001

The Right Reverend Eric Kemp FRHistS
- Bishop of Chichester
- Church: Church of England
- Province: Canterbury
- Diocese: Chichester
- Installed: 1974
- Term ended: 2001 (retirement)
- Predecessor: Roger Wilson
- Successor: John Hind
- Other posts: Bishop Emeritus of Chichester (2001–2009); Dean of Worcester (1969–1974)

Orders
- Ordination: 1939 (deacon); 1940 (priest)
- Consecration: 1974

Personal details
- Born: 27 April 1915
- Died: 28 November 2009 (aged 94)
- Denomination: Anglicanism
- Spouse: Patricia Kirk
- Children: 5
- Education: Exeter College, Oxford

Member of the House of Lords
- Lord Spiritual
- Bishop of Chichester; 28 November 1979 – 31 January 2001

Eric Waldram Kemp (27 April 1915 – 28 November 2009) was an English bishop in the Church of England. He was the Bishop of Chichester from 1974 to 2001. He was also one of the leading Anglo-Catholics of his generation and one of the most influential figures in the Church of England in the last quarter of the 20th century.

== Education ==
Kemp was educated at Brigg Grammar School and Exeter College, Oxford, graduating with the degrees of Bachelor of Arts in 1936, Master of Arts in 1940, Bachelor of Divinity in 1944 and Doctor of Divinity in 1961. He was elected a fellow of the Royal Historical Society in 1951 and received an honorary DLitt from the University of Sussex. He was made an honorary fellow of the University of Chichester in 2001.

== Ministry ==
Kemp trained for ordination at St Stephen's House, Oxford, from 1936 to 1939 where he later chaired the house council. He was made deacon on Trinity Sunday (4 June) 1939 and ordained priest the following Trinity Sunday (19 May 1940), both times by Cyril Garbett, Bishop of Winchester, at Winchester Cathedral. He was assistant curate of St Luke's Church in Newtown, Hampshire, from 1939 to 1941. He moved back to Oxford, where he remained for almost 31 years, first as priest librarian of Pusey House (1941–1946) and chaplain of Christ Church, Oxford (1943–1946) and then as fellow, tutor and chaplain of Exeter College, Oxford, from 1946 to 1969. He was dean of Worcester from 1969 to 1974 and Bishop of Chichester from 1974 to 2001.

Kemp was consecrated as a bishop on 23 October 1974 by Michael Ramsey, Archbishop of Canterbury, at Southwark Cathedral. This took place before the introduction of a mandatory retirement age, so Kemp was able to continue in the post for as long as he chose. As a result, on his retirement he was one of the oldest and one of the longest-serving diocesan bishops in Church of England history. He had also held subsidiary appointments as Chaplain to the Queen (1967–1969) and canon and prebendary of Lincoln Cathedral (1952–2001). In April 1998 he was appointed a chanoine d'honneur (canon of honour) of Chartres Cathedral. Following his retirement he was made Bishop Emeritus of Chichester.

== Family ==
Kemp's father-in-law, Kenneth E. Kirk, was Regius Professor of Moral and Pastoral Theology at the University of Oxford and Bishop of Oxford. Kemp wrote a book about Kirk and in 2001 presented his letters and papers to Lambeth Palace Library. He and his wife Patricia had five children. One of his daughters, Alice Kemp, has been ordained a Church of England priest in the Diocese of Bristol. One son is the playwright Edward Kemp, a former director of the Royal Academy of Dramatic Art. An aunt was the doctor and philanthropist Kathleen Rutherford.

== Significance ==
Kemp was one of the leading scholars of ecclesiastical law and a participant in conversations between the Church of England and the Methodist Church of Great Britain. He was a former member of the Court of Ecclesiastical Causes Reserved. In 1998 a volume of essays on English canon law was published in his honour.

He had special concern for homeless people and people living with HIV and Aids and was a supporter of the campaign to save the French Convalescent Home in Brighton. In 1994 he became president of the National Liberal Club.

He was one of only four bishops in the United Kingdom who declined to sign the Cambridge Accord, affirming the human rights of homosexuals.

He encouraged women to serve in the permanent diaconate in his diocese but was an opponent of the ordination of women to the priesthood and women priests were not licensed in the Diocese of Chichester during his episcopate. The first woman to be licensed in the diocese, following the appointment of Kemp's successor, John William Hind, was the Reverend Pat Sinton who was licensed as priest-in-charge of St Mary's Shipley in November 2001. In Kemp's time women were able to work within the diocese through the approval of the Archbishop of Canterbury.

== Publications ==
=== Author ===
- 1948: Canonization and Authority in the Western Church (London: Geoffrey Cumberlege, Oxford University Press)
- 1956: Bishops and Presbyters at Alexandria (London: Faber)
- 1957: An Introduction to Canon Law in the Church of England (London: Hodder and Stoughton)
- 1959: The Life and Letters of Kenneth Escott Kirk, Bishop of Oxford, 1937-1954 (London: Hodder & Stoughton)
- 1961: Counsel and Consent: aspects of the government of the Church as exemplified in the history of the English provincial synods (London: SPCK)
- 1964: The Anglican-Methodist Conversations: a comment from within (London: Oxford University Press)
- 1979: Square Words in a Round World (London: Fount)
- 2006: Shy but not Retiring: the memoirs of the Right Reverend Eric Waldram Kemp; edited and prepared for publication by Jeremy Matthew Haselock (London: Continuum ISBN 0-8264-8073-X)

=== Contributions ===
- 1948: E. G. Wood, The Regal Power of the Church: or, The fundamentals of the canon law (with a preface and a supplementary bibliography by E. W. Kemp (London: Dacre Press)
- 1954: N. P. Williams (London: SPCK) (sermons by Williams, with a memoir by Kemp)
- 1954: Papal Decretals Relating to the Diocese of Lincoln in the Twelfth Century (ed. with an introduction on the sources by Walther Holtzmann, with translations of the texts and an introduction on the Canon Law and its administration in the twelfth century by Eric Waldram Kemp, Publications of the Lincoln Record Society vol. 47, Hereford: Lincoln Record Society)

=== Edited ===
- 1969: Man: Fallen and Free; Oxford essays on the condition of man (London: Hodder & Stoughton)
