= Joe Kennedy (bishop) =

Scottish Anglican priest (born 1969)

The Right Reverend Dr Joe Kennedy
- Bishop of Burnley
- Church: Church of England
- Diocese: Diocese of Blackburn
- In office: 2024 to present
- Other posts: Vicar of St Saviour's Church, Oxton (2011–2024); Principal of the College of the Resurrection (2008–2011)

Orders
- Ordination: 2002 (deacon); 2003 (priest)
- Consecration: 19 July 2024 by Stephen Cottrell

Personal details
- Born: 1969 (age 56–57)
- Denomination: Anglicanism
- Education: University of Edinburgh; St Stephen's House, Oxford; St Hugh's College, Oxford; Keble College, Oxford

Joseph Kennedy (born 1969) is a Scottish Anglican bishop and academic. Since 2024, he has been Bishop of Burnley, a suffragan bishop in the Diocese of Blackburn. Having served in parish ministry in the Church of England and as a chaplain to two Cambridge University colleges, he was Principal of the College of the Resurrection from 2008 to 2011. He then served as vicar of St Saviour's Church, Oxton in the Diocese of Chester until his elevation to the episcopate.

== Early life and education ==
Kennedy was born in 1969 in Edinburgh, Scotland. He studied mathematics at the University of Edinburgh, graduating with a Bachelor of Science (BSc) degree in 1991. He remained at Edinburgh to study theology, and graduated with a Bachelor of Divinity (BD) degree in 1994. He trained as a teacher and completed his Postgraduate Certificate in Education (PGCE) at the Moray House College of Education in 1997.

In 1998, Kennedy entered St Stephen's House, Oxford, an Anglo-Catholic theological college, to train for ordination. During this time, he studied for a Master of Studies (MSt) degree at St Hugh's College, Oxford, which he completed in 2000. He left St Stephen's House in 2002 to be ordained in the Church of England. He continued his studies in the form of a Doctor of Philosophy (DPhil) degree at Keble College, Oxford. He completed his DPhil in 2006 with a doctoral thesis titled "A Critical Analysis of George A. Lindbeck's The Nature of Doctrine".

== Career ==
Kennedy was ordained in the Church of England as a deacon in 2002 and as a priest in 2003. He undertook his curacy in the Diocese of Oxford, first in the Benefice of Stratfield Mortimer (2002–2003), and then at the Benefice of Abingdon-on-Thames (2003–2005). In 2005, he joined Selwyn College, Cambridge, as a fellow and its dean of chapel. He was additionally chaplain to Newnham College, Cambridge. Then, in 2008, he became principal of the College of the Resurrection, a theological college in Mirfield, Yorkshire. He was made an honorary canon of Wakefield Cathedral in 2010.

After three years in charge of a theological college, Kennedy returned to parish ministry and became vicar of St Saviour's Church, Oxton in Diocese of Chester in 2011. He was additionally a lecturer and tutor at St Mellitus College North West, a non-residential theological college, from 2015 until 2020. He was also the rural dean of Birkenhead from 2021, a deanery that covers ten differing parishes.

=== Episcopal ministry ===
On 22 March 2024, it was announced that Kennedy would be the next Bishop of Burnley, a suffragan bishop in the Diocese of Blackburn. On 19 July 2024, he was consecrated as a bishop by Stephen Cottrell, the Archbishop of York, during a service at York Minster. The co-consecrators were Pete Wilcox, Bishop of Sheffield, and Helen-Ann Hartley, Bishop of Newcastle. He will then be welcomed into his new diocese during a service at Blackburn Cathedral on 8 September 2024.

== Personal life ==
Kennedy is married to Emily; she is a chartered accountant and head of external financial reporting at Oxfam as of 2024. Together, they have two children.
