= Martin Warner (bishop) =

English Anglican bishop (born 1958)

The Right Reverend Dr Martin Warner SSC
- Bishop of Chichester
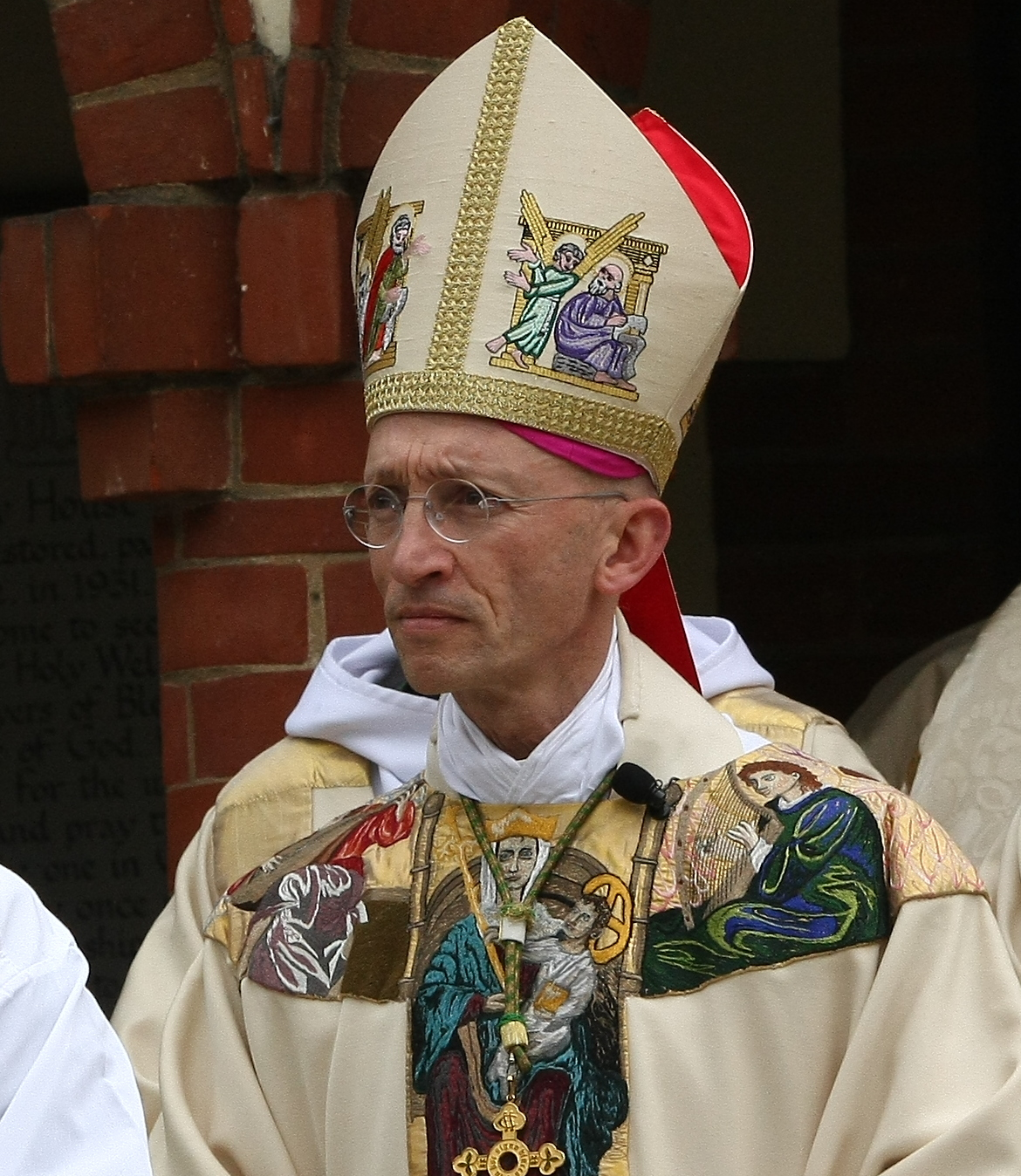
- Warner in May 2010, when Bishop of Whitby
- Church: Church of England
- Diocese: Chichester
- In office: 2012–2026
- Predecessor: John Hind
- Previous post: Bishop of Whitby (2010–2012)

Orders
- Ordination: 1984 (deacon); 1985 (priest)
- Consecration: 26 January 2010 by John Sentamu

Personal details
- Born: 24 December 1958 (age 67)
- Denomination: Anglican
- Residence: The Palace, Chichester
- Education: Durham University

Member of the House of Lords
- Lord Spiritual
- Bishop of Chichester; 3 January 2018 – 31 May 2026

Martin Clive Warner SSC (born 24 December 1958) is an Anglican bishop in England. From 2012 until 2026 he was the Bishop of Chichester, the diocesan bishop of the Diocese of Chichester. Previously, he was administrator of the Anglican Shrine of Our Lady of Walsingham (1993–2002) and the Bishop of Whitby in the Diocese of York (2010–2012). A traditionalist Anglo-Catholic, he does not ordain women to the priesthood, and is on the Council of Bishops of The Society.

== Early life and education ==
Warner was born on born 24 December 1958. He was educated at King's School, Rochester, Maidstone Grammar School and St Chad's College, Durham University (1977–80). He then trained for ordination at St Stephen's House, Oxford, later earning a Doctor of Philosophy (PhD) degree at the Durham University. His doctoral thesis was titled "Virginity matters: power and ambiguity in the attraction of the Virgin Mary".

== Ordained ministry ==
Warner was ordained in the Church of England as a deacon in 1984 and as a priest in 1985.

- Assistant curate at St Peter's, Plymouth (1984–1988)
- Team vicar of the Parish of the Resurrection, Leicester (1988–1993)
- Administrator of the Anglican Shrine of Our Lady of Walsingham (1993–2002)
- Priest in charge of Hempton with Pudding Norton (1998–2000)
- Honorary canon of Norwich Cathedral (2000–?)
- Associate vicar at St Andrew Holborn (2002–2003)

Warner was a canon residentiary at St Paul's Cathedral (2003–2009), the canon pastor from 2003 to 2008 and then canon treasurer until 2009.

=== Episcopal ministry ===
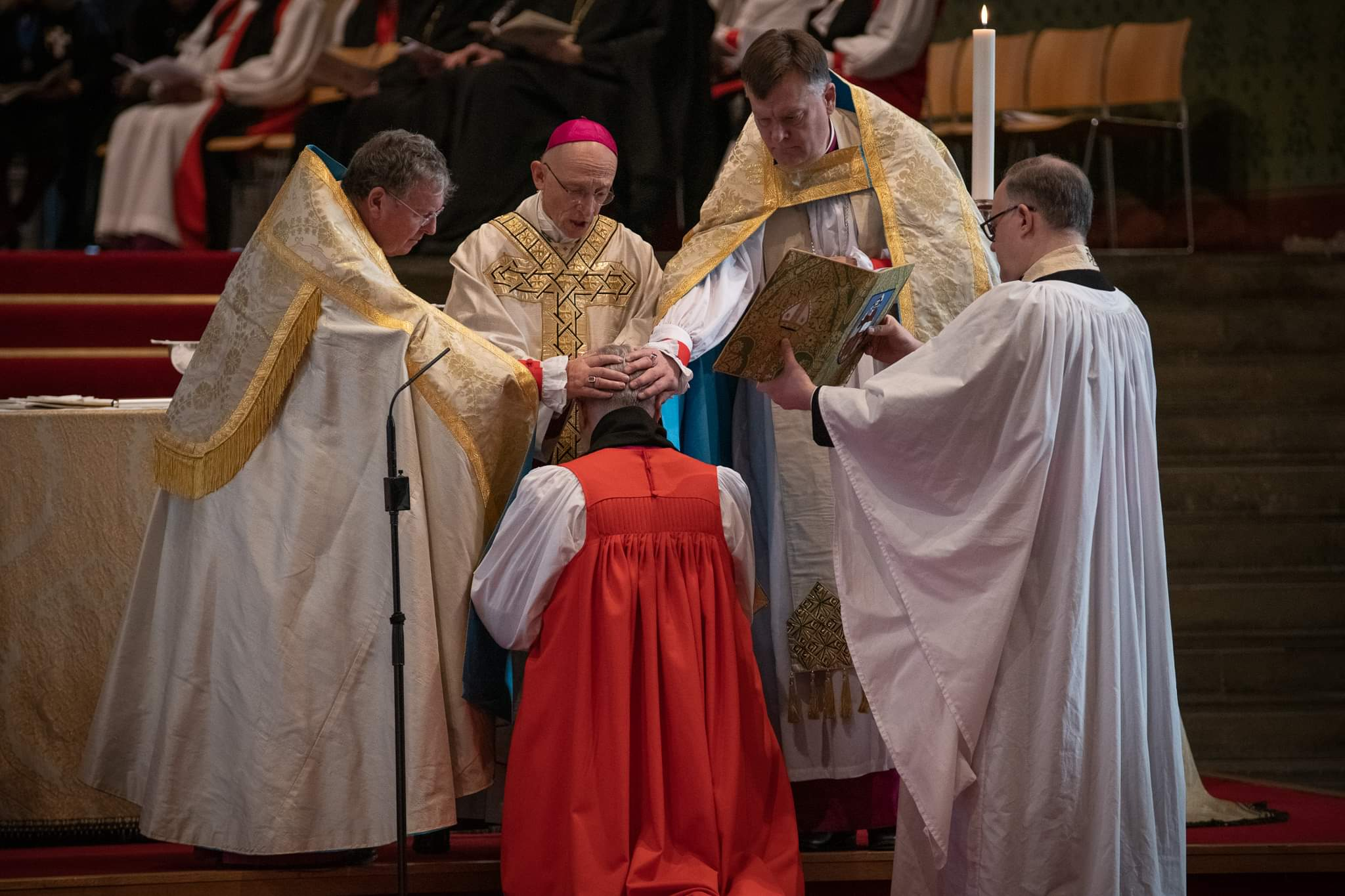
Paul Thomas' consecration in 2023

Warner was consecrated as Bishop of Whitby in the Church of England at York Minster on 26 January 2010 and then welcomed on 30 January 2010 at St Hilda's Church, Whitby. He suffered a cardiac arrest on 23 August 2010 while on holiday in Florence, but returned to work. From 2008 to 2011, Warner wrote the weekly "Sunday's Readings" column for the Church Times.

On 3 May 2012, Warner's appointment as the next diocesan Bishop of Chichester was announced, his election was confirmed on 2 July and his enthronement took place in Chichester Cathedral on 25 November.

In a compromise by John Sentamu, Archbishop of York, to whom the candidate professed canonical obedience, Warner officiated as principal celebrant in the laying-on of hands and Eucharist for the episcopal consecration of Philip North as suffragan Bishop of Burnley at York Minster on 2 February 2015 (Feast of Candlemas).

He was introduced to the House of Lords as a Lord Spiritual on 15 January 2018.

In February 2026, it was announce that he would be retiring as Bishop of Chichester in May 2026. He will return to parish ministry, and become priest in charge of St Peter's Church, Folkestone on 7 July 2026; it is a traditional Anglo-Catholic church in the Diocese of Canterbury under the episcopal care of the Bishop of Richborough.

=== Views ===
On 20 November 2012, Warner was one of three bishops (and one of the two diocesans) in the General Synod who voted against a motion to allow the ordination of women as bishops in the Church of England. His position on the issue has been criticised by some local clergy and parishioners across the Chichester diocese.

He is a member of the Council of Bishops of The Society, an association of traditionalist Anglo-Catholics.

In 2023, following the news that the House of Bishops of the Church of England was to introduce proposals for blessing same-sex relationships, he signed an open letter which stated:

many Christians in the Church of England and the Anglican Communion, together with Christians from across the churches of world Christianity, continue to believe that marriage is given by God for the union of a man and woman and that it cannot be extended to those who are of the same sex. [...] Without seeking to diminish the value of many committed same-sex relationships, for which there is much to give thanks, we find ourselves constrained by what we sincerely believe the Scriptures teach which cannot be set aside.

He voted against introducing "standalone services for same-sex couples" on a trial basis during a meeting of the General Synod in November 2023; the motion passed.

== Styles ==
- The Reverend Martin Warner (1984–2000)
- The Reverend Canon Martin Warner (2000–2003)
- The Reverend Canon Doctor Martin Warner (2003–2010)
- The Right Reverend Doctor Martin Warner (2010–present)

Church of England titles
Preceded by John Hind	Bishop of Chichester; 2012–2026	Succeeded by TBC
