= John Hind (bishop of Chichester) =

British theologian and bishop

The Right Reverend John Hind
- Bishop of Chichester
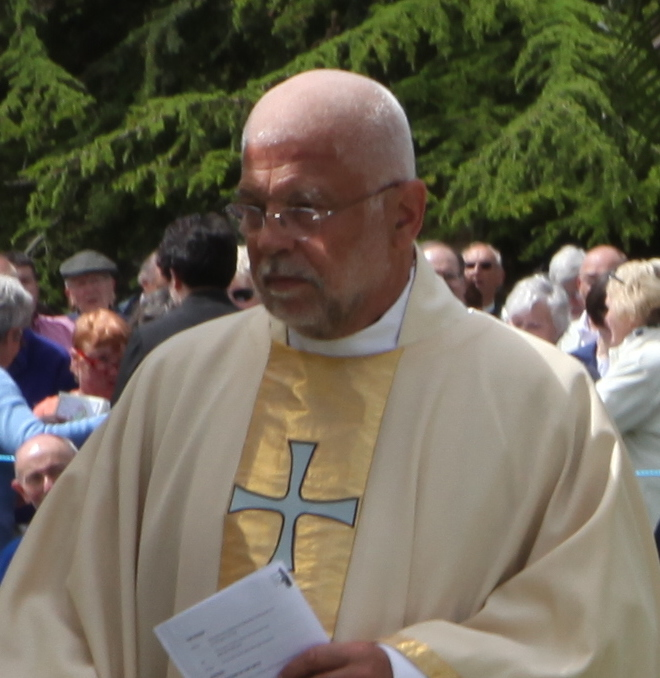
- Bishop Hind in 2012
- Church: Church of England
- Province: Canterbury
- Diocese: Chichester
- In office: 2001 to 2012
- Predecessor: Eric Kemp
- Successor: Martin Warner
- Previous posts: Bishop in Europe (1993–2001); Bishop of Horsham (1991–1993)

Orders
- Ordination: 1972
- Consecration: 1991 by George Carey

Personal details
- Born: 19 June 1945 (age 81) Watford, Hertfordshire, England
- Denomination: Anglican
- Parents: Harold Hind and Joan Kemp
- Spouse: Janet McLintock
- Education: Leeds University; Cuddesdon College

Member of the House of Lords
- Lord Spiritual
- Bishop of Chichester; 13 March 2008 – 30 April 2012

John William Hind (born 19 June 1945) is an Anglo-Catholic theologian and Church of England bishop. He served as Bishop in Europe from 1993 to 2001 and Bishop of Chichester from 2001 until he retired in 2012.

== Early life and education ==
Hind was born in Watford, Hertfordshire, on 19 June 1945. He attended Watford Grammar School for Boys and went to Leeds University where he studied theology before teaching in a secondary school and a college of education. Hind trained for ordination at Cuddesdon College.

== Ordained ministry ==
Hind was ordained at Southwark Cathedral in 1972. After parish ministry in the Diocese of Southwark; St John's Catford as a curate (1972–76) and Christ Church, Forest Hill as vicar (1976–82), Hind was appointed the principal of Chichester Theological College in 1982.

=== Episcopal ministry ===
Hind became the area and suffragan Bishop of Horsham in the Chichester diocese in 1991 and in 1993 became the Bishop in Europe ("Bishop of Gibraltar in Europe" in full).

On the retirement of Eric Kemp in 2001 after 26 years as Bishop of Chichester, Hind succeeded him in the see which had included Wilfrid, Richard of Chichester, Lancelot Andrewes and George Bell as its bishops.

In 2008 a priest in his diocese was convicted for historic child sex abuse, and a subsequent review by Baroness Butler-Sloss for the Church of England was critical of senior clergy for being slow to act on information available to them. In 2011 the Archbishop of Canterbury appointed an enquiry into the long running child protection issues in the diocese. The interim enquiry report found that there had been "an appalling history" over two decades of child protection problems, and many children had suffered hurt and damage. Because of concerns that safeguarding still remained dysfunctional, Lambeth Palace took over the oversight of clergy appointments and the protection of children and vulnerable adults in the diocese.

On 7 July 2011, Hind announced his intention to retire in April 2012. He duly retired effective 30 April 2012 – his suffragan Mark Sowerby became Acting Bishop of Chichester (since the senior suffragan in the diocese, Wallace Benn, was involved with an ongoing investigation into diocesan safeguarding procedures) and his successor (Martin Warner, Bishop of Whitby) was announced three days later.

On 28 May 2012 Hind was licensed as an honorary assistant bishop in the Diocese of Portsmouth.

=== Views ===
Hind belongs to the traditionalist Anglo-Catholic wing of the Church of England.

Although the Diocese of Chichester includes the city of Brighton and Hove, which has a disproportionately high percentage gay population, Hind has a history of opposition to initiatives such as (and including) civil partnership. He signed a petition organised by the Coalition for Marriage, opposing same-sex marriage.

Hind was also one of the bishops who signed a letter against Rowan Williams' decision not to block the appointment of Jeffrey John as Bishop of Reading in 2003, due to John being a self-identified homosexual. The other diocesan bishop signatories (referred to by their opponents, since there were nine, as the Nazgûl) were Michael Scott-Joynt (Bishop of Winchester), Michael Langrish (Exeter), Michael Nazir-Ali (Rochester), Peter Forster (Chester), James Jones (Liverpool), George Cassidy (Southwell & Nottingham), Graham Dow (Carlisle) and David James (Bradford).

In October 2009, the Sunday Telegraph claimed that Hind had said that he would be happy to be reordained as a priest in the Roman Catholic Church and that divisions in Anglicanism could make it impossible for him to stay in the Church of England. In a statement published in response to the article, Hind stated that this "is not the case" and "that I would not be willing to deny the priesthood I have exercised hitherto".

== Family ==
Hind is the elder son of Harold Hind (1915–97) and Joan Kemp (1918–76) and is married to Janet McLintock, a former social worker and Child protection Adviser for the Church of England and present Child Protection Adviser for the Diocese of Guildford. They have three children.

== Styles ==
- John Hind Esq (1945–1972)
- The Revd John Hind (1972–1991)
- The Rt Revd John Hind (1991–2009)
- The Rt Revd Dr John Hind (2009–present)
