= Ronald Goodchild =

British Anglican priest

Ronald Cedric Osbourne Goodchild (1910 – 28 December 1998) was the seventh Anglican Bishop suffragan of Kensington between 1964 and 1980, and the first area bishop from the 1979 institution of the London area scheme.

He was born in Parramatta, Australia in 1910, educated at St. John's School, Leatherhead and Trinity College, Cambridge and ordained priest in 1934.

After a curacy at Ealing he was Chaplain at Oakham School before wartime service as a chaplain with the RAFVR. When peace returned he rose steadily in the Church hierarchy being successively Warden of St Michael House, Hamburg, Secretary of the Student Christian Movement, Vicar of Horsham and finally Archdeacon of Northampton (1959–64) before elevation to the Episcopate in 1964.

In retirement he served as an Assistant Bishop at Exeter and died on 28 December 1998.

Church of England titles
| Preceded by Edward Roberts | Bishop of Kensington; 1964–1980 | Succeeded by Mark Santer |
