= College of the Resurrection =

Anglo-Catholic theological college in England

Coordinates: 53.6821°N 1.7130°W

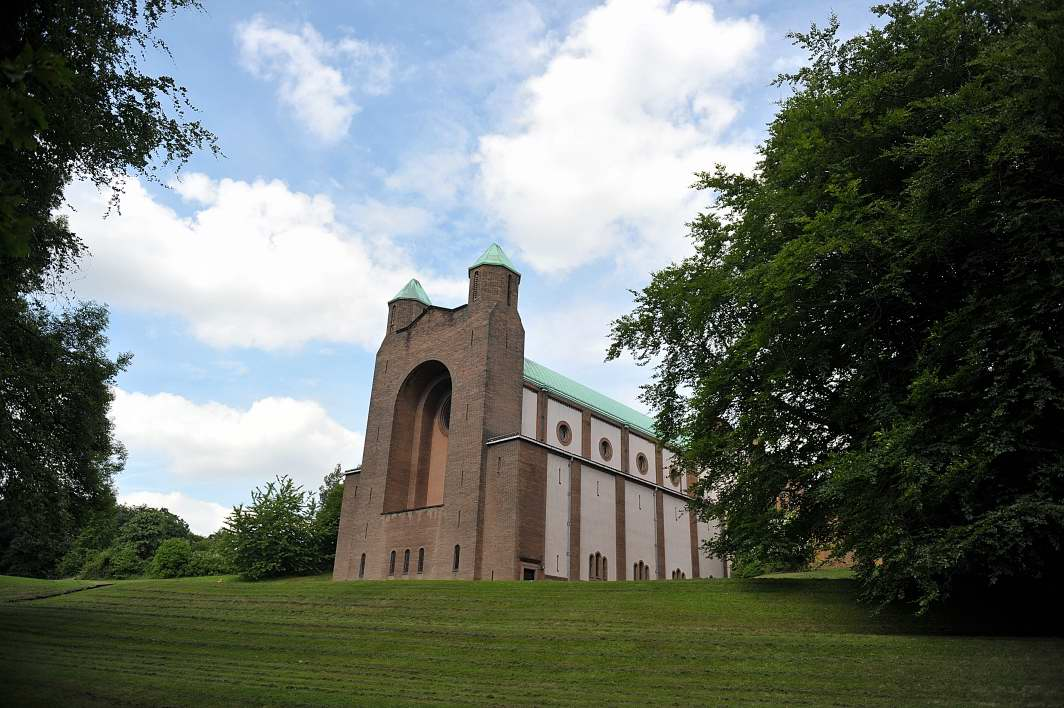
- Church of the College of the Resurrection
- Motto: Surrexit Alleluia!
- Type: Anglican theological college
- Established: 1903
- Affiliations: Church of England
- Principal: Mark Sowerby
- Academic staff: 5 full-time tutorial staff
- Location: Mirfield, West Yorkshire, United Kingdom
- Website: college.mirfield.org.uk

The College of the Resurrection, popularly known as Mirfield, is an Anglo-Catholic theological college of the Church of England in Mirfield, West Yorkshire, England.

The college was founded in 1902 and describes itself as "A Theological College like no other". The college has close links to the Community of the Resurrection. It trains men and women in the Anglo-Catholic tradition for the priesthood.

== Daily life ==
All resident students are expected to attend Matins and Evensong six days a week. On most days the college says Matins and celebrates Low Mass in the college chapel and joins the Community of the Resurrection to sing Evensong. Saturday is the normal day off each week when there are no obligations. On Sundays, students are expected to join the community for Matins and the Solemn Mass.

The college and community of the Resurrection maintain liturgical worship in the Catholic tradition using vestments and incense. Later in the morning, students normally go to a local parish church as part of their pastoral formation.

Single students live at the college, married students in nearby houses owned by the college. The married-student houses range in size from two to four bedrooms and none are more than a ten-minute walk from the college.

== University of Durham ==
The college, along with YTEP, began a new relationship with the University of Durham in 2020. This partnership provides a variety of learning programmes, from the Common Awards to a variety of masters programmes.

== Yorkshire Theological Educational Partnership ==
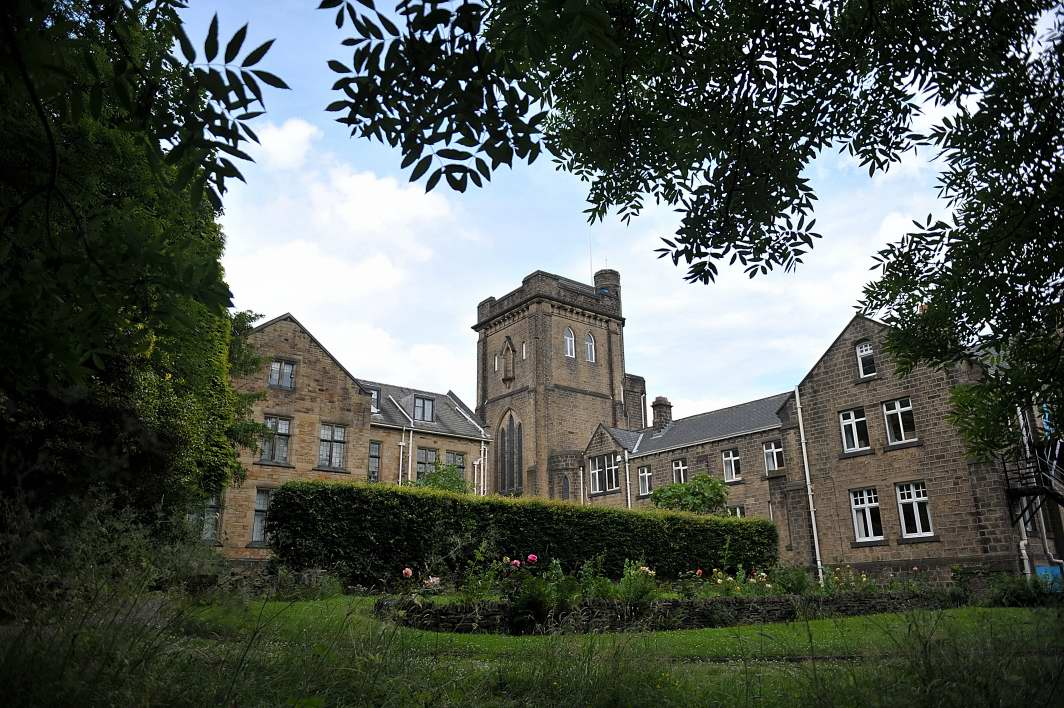
The College

The Yorkshire Theological Educational Partnership (formerly Ministry Course YMC), was established in 1970 as the North West Ordination Course. It was renamed in 1980 as the Northern Ordination Course. It took students from the dioceses of Chester, Blackburn, Liverpool and Manchester. It opened dialogue with the College of the Resurrection in 1996, establishing an Eastern arm in Yorkshire at the College of the Resurrection.

In 2008 as a result of the reconfiguration subsequent to the Hind Report, the Northern Ordination Course separated from its Manchester base remaining established at Mirfield. It was then renamed the Yorkshire Ministry Course and became located on the Mirfield site along with the college, centre and community. Now, the rebranded YTEP department serves the Dioceses of Leeds, of Sheffield and of York.

== Programmes ==
College buildings

The following programmes are offered in partnership with the University of Durham:

- BA (Honours) in Theological Studies

Normally three years full-time, but candidates who have a good honours degree in a subject other than theology, or the equivalent of Level 1 in theological study, may be admitted to the degree at Level 2 and so complete the course in two years.

- MA in Ministry and Theology

One year full-time, two years part-time or three and a half years on a professional development pathway. This is available for ordination candidates and others who have a 2.1 or above in a first degree (BA or equivalent) in theology/religious studies. Humanities, social science or other subjects are considered, where the applicant can show evidence of relevant experience, background or private study in theology.

- MA in Ministry and Biblical Studies

One year full-time, two years part-time or three and a half years on a professional development pathway. This programme allows students to draw on the expertise of the Department of Biblical Studies at Durham, while following a programme of study that maintains a focus on the practice of ministry.

- MA in Liturgy

One year full-time, two years part-time or three and a half years on a professional development pathway. This programme allows students to focus their studies on liturgy, while still offering the opportunity to draw from other areas of theology and biblical studies.

- Research degrees: MA by Research, MPhil, PhD

Candidates may apply via the college for a research degree of the University of Durham, provided that appropriate supervision can be arranged either at the college or in the Department of Biblical Studies at the university.

== Ecumenism ==
The college has had a long relationship with other Christian traditions, accepting students from many denominations outside of the Anglican Communion. Here are some examples:

- An annual scholarship for graduate students of the Romanian Orthodox Church.
- Student exchanges between Mirfield and the Lutheran Theological Institute in Sibiu.
- Helping to found the Romanian Orthodox parish of Saint Macarios the Great, Mirfield, in 2004.
- Accepting students from the Lutheran Church of Sweden.
- Accepting both Roman Catholic seminarians and Methodist students for ordination on exchange visits from their own colleges.
- Accepting students and priests from the Oriental Orthodox Churches.
- Working closely with the Armenian Apostolic Church.

== Teaching staff ==
The teaching staff in early 2026 includes:

- The Reverend Dr Dorothea Bertschmann – Academic Dean, Lecturer in Biblical Studies
- The Reverend Fr Tony Carroll – Lecturer in Christian Doctrine
- The Reverend Fr David Babbington – Dean of Pastoral Studies
- The Reverend Dr Jo Kershaw – Lecturer in Liturgy
- The Right Reverend Mark Sowerby – Principal

=== List of principals ===
| Period | Principal | Notes |
|---|---|---|
| 1902−1908 | The Reverend Fr Caleb Ritson CR | |
| 1908−1922 | The Reverend Fr Bernard Horner CR | |
| 1922–1928 | The Reverend Fr Timothy Rees CR | Appointed Bishop of Llandaff in 1931 |
| 1928–1933 | The Reverend Fr Wilfrid Shelly CR | |
| 1933–1940 | The Reverend Fr Thomas Haney CR | |
| 1940–1947 | The Reverend Fr Joseph Barker CR | |
| 1947−1949 | The Reverend Fr Douglas Edwards CR | |
| 1949–1955 | The Reverend Fr Andrew Blair CR | |
| 1956–66 | The Reverend Fr Hugh Bishop CR | |
| 1966–1975 | The Reverend Fr William Wheeldon CR | Left the Community of the Resurrection in 1976 to return to parish ministry |
| 1975–1984 | The Reverend Fr Benedict Green CR | |
| 1984–1990 | The Reverend Fr Denys Lloyd CR | Left the Community of the Resurrection in 1990 to join the Roman Catholic Church |
| 1990–1997 | The Reverend David Lane | An Anglican priest who was an oblate, rather than a professed member, of the Community of the Resurrection |
| 1998–2007 | The Reverend Christopher Irvine | Not a member of the Community of the Resurrection; now Canon Librarian of Canterbury Cathedral |
| 2008–2011 | The Reverend Joseph Kennedy | Not a member of the Community of the Resurrection; now Vicar of St Saviour's Church, Oxton |
| 2011–2019 | The Reverend Fr Peter Allan CR | Retired at the end of the 2018/2019 academic year |
| 2019 onwards | The Right Reverend Mark Sowerby | Principal; not a member of the Community of the Resurrection |

== Notable alumni ==
- Donald Arden – Archbishop of Central Africa
- Patrick Barron – Bishop of George, South Africa
- Tom Butler – Bishop of Southwark
- Richard Coles – musician, radio presenter and parish priest
- John Crook – Bishop of Moray, Ross and Caithness
- John Flack – Bishop of Huntingdon
- Anselm Genders CR – Bishop of Bermuda
- Jonathan Greener – Dean of Exeter
- Thomas Hannay – Primus of the Scottish Episcopal Church
- John Hannen – Bishop of Caledonia, Canada
- James Hughes – Archbishop of Central Africa
- Luke Irvine-Capel - Archdeacon of Chichester
- John Maund – Bishop of Lesotho, South Africa
- Eric Munn – Bishop of Caledonia, Canada
- Basil Peacey – Bishop of Lemombo, Portuguese Mozambique
- Edward Pugh – Bishop of Penrith
- Nicholas Reade – Bishop of Blackburn
- Ambrose Reeves – Bishop of Johannesburg, South Africa
- John Satterthwaite – Bishop in Europe
- Mark Sowerby – Bishop of Horsham
- Humphrey Taylor – Bishop of Selby
- Eric Trapp – Bishop of Bermuda
- Peter Wheatley – former Bishop of Edmonton
- Rowan Williams – former Archbishop of Canterbury
- Mark Wood – Bishop of Ludlow
