= Bishop of Horsham =

Episcopal title of the Church of England

The Bishop of Horsham is an episcopal title used by a suffragan bishop (area bishop from 1984 to 2013) of the Church of England Diocese of Chichester, in the Province of Canterbury, England. The title takes its name after the market town of Horsham in West Sussex.

Horsham was one of the thirteen new post-English Reformation bishoprics and dioceses proposed by King Henry VIII in an ecclesiastical revision proposal written in the king's own handwriting. The subsequent reallocation of former monastic incomes allowed for the eventual creation of only six of these thirteen dioceses. Nonetheless, an area of west Horsham became known as a 'Bishopric'. When new sees (both suffragan and diocesan) were established by the Church of England in the 20th century, the proposed Tudor dioceses which had not come into being were considered as episcopal titles. Horsham was one of those chosen (as was Leicester).

The current bishop is Ruth Bushyager. The bishops suffragan of Horsham were area bishops from when the Chichester area scheme was erected in 1984 until it was ended in 2013. The bishop oversees the archdeaconries of Chichester & Horsham.

== List of bishops ==
Bishops of Horsham
From	Until	Incumbent	Notes
1968	1974	Simon Phipps	Translated to Lincoln
1975	1991	Colin Docker	First area bishop from 1984
1991	1993	John Hind	Translated to Gibraltar in Europe, and later to Chichester
1993	2009	Lindsay Urwin OGS	Resigned as bishop on 28 February 2009; Administrator of the Anglican Shrine at Walsingham since February 2009 until his resignation in 2015. Assistant Bishop in the Diocese of Melbourne since 2016.
2009	2019	Mark Sowerby	Nominated on 19 June 2009, consecrated on 25 July 2009; last area bishop until 2013; resigned 31 August 2019.
2020	present	Ruth Bushyager	Consecrated 15 July 2020 (morning)

== See also ==
- Archdeacon of Horsham
