= Diocese of Chichester =

Diocese of the Church of England

Coordinates: 50.8363°N 0.7808°W

Diocese of Chichester Dioecesis Cicestrensis
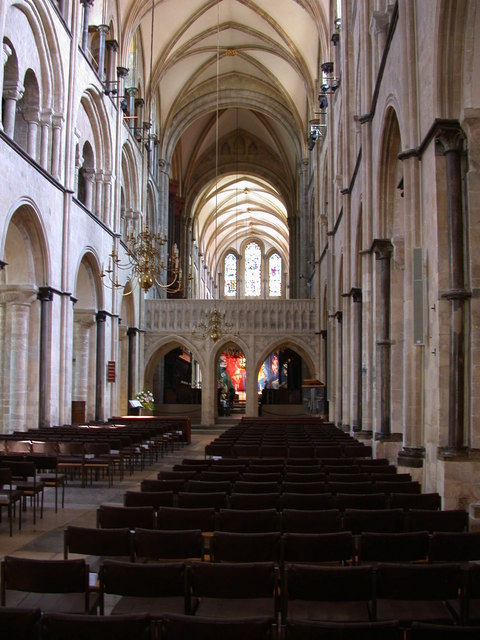
- Nave of Chichester Cathedral

- Coat of arms

- Flag

Location
- Ecclesiastical province: Canterbury
- Archdeaconries: Chichester, Horsham, Hastings, Brighton & Lewes

Statistics
- Parishes: 365
- Churches: 500

Information
- Cathedral: Chichester Cathedral (1075–present); Selsey Abbey (681–1075)
- Language: English

Current leadership
- Bishop: Martin Warner
- Suffragans: Ruth Bushyager, Bishop of Horsham; Will Hazlewood, Bishop of Lewes
- Archdeacons: Martin Lloyd Williams, Archdeacon of Brighton & Lewes; Angela Martin, Archdeacon of Horsham; Tom Carpenter, Archdeacon of Chichester; Russell Dewhurst, Archdeacon-designate of Hastings

Website
- chichester.anglican.org

The Diocese of Chichester is a Church of England diocese based in Chichester, covering Sussex. It was founded in 681 as the ancient Diocese of Selsey, which was based at Selsey Abbey, until the see was translated to Chichester in 1075. The cathedral is Chichester Cathedral and the diocesan bishop is the Bishop of Chichester. The diocese is in the Province of Canterbury.

== Organisation ==
The Bishop of Chichester has overall episcopal oversight of the diocese, with certain responsibilities delegated to the Bishop of Horsham and the Bishop of Lewes. The suffragan See of Lewes was created in 1909 and was the suffragan bishop for the whole diocese until the See of Horsham was created in 1968.

The four archdeaconries of the diocese are Chichester, Horsham, Hastings and Brighton & Lewes. Until 2014, the Archdeaconry of Chichester covered the coastal region of West Sussex along with Brighton and Hove. The Archdeaconry of Horsham covered the remainder of West Sussex; and the Archdeaconry of Lewes & Hastings covered East Sussex.

On 12 May 2014, it was announced that the diocese would take forward proposals to create a fourth archdeaconry (initially referred to as Brighton). Since Lewes itself would be within the new archdeaconry, Lewes & Hastings archdeaconry would become simply Hastings archdeaconry. On 8 August 2014, the Church Times reported that the archdeaconry of Brighton & Lewes had been created and Hastings archdeaconry renamed. On 12 October 2014, it was announced that, from 2015, Martin Lloyd Williams would become the first Archdeacon of Brighton & Lewes.

The 21 deaneries of the diocese are:

Diocese	Archdeaconries	Rural Deaneries
Diocese of Chichester	Archdeaconry of Chichester	Deanery of Arundel and Bognor
Diocese of Chichester	Archdeaconry of Chichester	Deanery of Chichester
Diocese of Chichester	Archdeaconry of Chichester	Deanery of Westbourne
Diocese of Chichester	Archdeaconry of Chichester	Deanery of Worthing
Diocese of Chichester	Archdeaconry of Brighton & Lewes	Deanery of Brighton
Diocese of Chichester	Archdeaconry of Brighton & Lewes	Deanery of Hove
Diocese of Chichester	Archdeaconry of Brighton & Lewes	Deanery of Lewes and Seaford
Diocese of Chichester	Archdeaconry of Hastings	Deanery of Battle and Bexhill
Diocese of Chichester	Archdeaconry of Hastings	Deanery of Dallington
Diocese of Chichester	Archdeaconry of Hastings	Deanery of Eastbourne
Diocese of Chichester	Archdeaconry of Hastings	Deanery of Hastings
Diocese of Chichester	Archdeaconry of Hastings	Deanery of Rotherfield
Diocese of Chichester	Archdeaconry of Hastings	Deanery of Rye
Diocese of Chichester	Archdeaconry of Hastings	Deanery of Uckfield
Diocese of Chichester	Archdeaconry of Horsham	Deanery of Cuckfield
Diocese of Chichester	Archdeaconry of Horsham	Deanery of East Grinstead
Diocese of Chichester	Archdeaconry of Horsham	Deanery of Horsham
Diocese of Chichester	Archdeaconry of Horsham	Deanery of Hurst
Diocese of Chichester	Archdeaconry of Horsham	Deanery of Midhurst
Diocese of Chichester	Archdeaconry of Horsham	Deanery of Petworth
Diocese of Chichester	Archdeaconry of Horsham	Deanery of Storrington

=== Bishops ===
Alongside the diocesan Bishop of Chichester (Martin Warner), the diocese has two suffragan bishops: the Bishop of Horsham (Ruth Bushyager) and the Bishop of Lewes (Will Hazlewood). The Bishop of Horsham oversees the archdeaconries of Chichester and Horsham, while the Bishop of Lewes oversees the archdeaconries of Brighton & Lewes and Hastings.

Other bishops living in the diocese are licensed as honorary assistant bishops:

- 1992–present: Michael Marshall, former suffragan Bishop of Woolwich, lives outside the diocese in Chelsea, London.
- 1995–present: David Wilcox, retired suffragan Bishop of Dorking, lives in Willingdon.
- 2005–present: Ken Barham, retired diocesan Bishop of Cyangugu, Rwanda, lives in Battle.
- 2009–present: Christopher Herbert, retired diocesan Bishop of St Albans, lives outside the diocese, in Wrecclesham, Surrey.
- 2010–present: Henry Scriven, Mission Director for Latin America (CMS) and former Assistant Bishop in Pittsburgh and Suffragan Bishop in Europe, lives in Abingdon-on-Thames, Oxfordshire, and is also licensed in Oxford and Winchester dioceses.
- 2011–present: Alan Chesters, retired diocesan Bishop of Blackburn, lives in Chichester, West Sussex.
- 2011–present: Laurie Green, former area Bishop of Bradwell, retired to Bexhill-on-Sea.

Three further bishops retired to West Sussex in 2013: Michael Langrish, former diocesan Bishop of Exeter, moved to Walberton; Christopher Morgan, former area Bishop of Colchester, lives in Worthing; and Geoffrey Rowell, retired Bishop in Europe and suffragan Bishop of Basingstoke, lived in Chichester until his death in 2017.

There is no alternative episcopal oversight (for parishes in the diocese that reject the ministry of priests who are women) in the diocese because the ordinary (Martin Warner) does not ordain women as priests.

=== Episcopal areas ===
From 1974 until 2013 (by area scheme from 1984 onwards), episcopal oversight of the diocese was divided: the Bishop of Chichester retained direct oversight of a coastal area including the See city and Brighton, and delegated Ordinary authority for the rest of West and East Sussex to the area Bishops of Horsham and of Lewes respectively.

== History ==
Christianity was introduced to the British Isles during the Roman occupation. When the Romans departed, there were waves of non-Christian invasions from northern Europe; these were mainly Angles, Saxons and Jutes. Celtic Christianity was driven, along with the Celts, into the remote western parts of the islands. The south of England was settled by Saxons. After the invasions had finished, Roman missionaries evangelized the southeast of England and Celtic missionaries evangelized the rest of the British Isles.

The Kingdom of Sussex remained steadfastly non-Christian until the arrival of Saint Wilfrid in 681 AD. Wilfrid built his cathedral church in Selsey and dedicated it to Saint Peter. The original structure would have been made largely of wood. The stones from the old cathedral would have been used in the later church. Some stonework discovered in a local garden wall was believed to have come from the palm cross that stood outside the original cathedral and is now integrated into the war memorial that is in the perimeter wall outside the church.

The cathedral founded at Selsey was probably built at Church Norton, where the chancel of the old church still remains. Selsey Abbey was the first seat of the South Saxon see. The seat was moved to Chichester in 1075 under William the Conqueror.

== Insignia and shield of the diocese ==
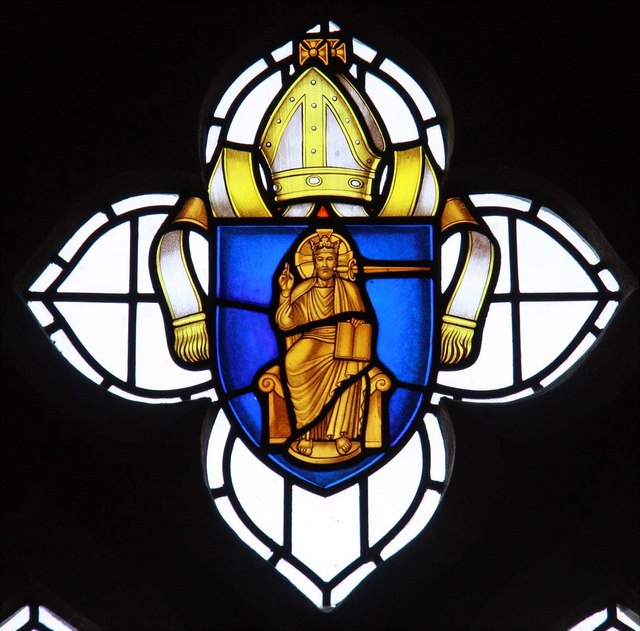
The coat of arms of the Diocese of Chichester in stained glass at St Cosmas and St Damian Church, Keymer

One of the earliest representations of the diocesan coat of arms is that on the seal of Bishop Ralph Neville (1224–1243). A similar representation appears on the seal of his successor, St Richard (1244–1253). In heraldic language the arms are blazoned as follows:

Azure a representation of Our Saviour seated crowned and a glory round His head, His right hand raised in benediction, His left resting on an open book Or, in His mouth a sword fessewise, point to the sinister Gules.

Most of the older English cathedrals have arms of a simple design, usually various combinations of crosses, swords, keys, and so on. Our Lady and the Holy Child are, however, shown in the top third of Lincoln's shield and occupy the whole of Salisbury's shield. Excluding the Diocese of Sodor and Man, which was linked with Denmark prior to 1546, Chichester is the only other old diocese that includes a human figure in its arms. Over the centuries, identifying the figure has attracted some unusual theories. The most common misconception, which was still being repeated in 1894, was that the arms show "Presbyter John sitting on a tombstone". Presbyter John, or "Prester John" as he is more commonly known, was a figure of medieval fantasy who appeared in many books and travellers' tales. It was said that he was an all-powerful and immensely rich Christian emperor who lived in the East or in Africa and who would come to the aid of Crusaders. A letter circulated in Europe in about 1165 referred to the annual visit of Prester John and his army, complete with chariots and elephants, to the tomb of the prophet Daniel in Babylonia Deserta. It was the imagery of this letter that seems to have become attached to Chichester's diocesan coat of arms.

It is much more likely that the imagery is parallel to that seen in an early fourteenth-century manuscript of the Apocalypse of St John. This illustrates several passages with a figure who variously has a sword across his mouth, holds an open book, and is seated on a throne. The clearest illustration accompanies chapter 19, verses 11–16:

I saw heaven standing open and there before me was a white horse, whose rider is called Faithful and True. With justice he judges and makes war. His eyes are like blazing fire, and on his head are many crowns. He has a name written on him that no-one knows but he himself. He is dressed in a robe dipped in blood, and his name is the Word of God. The armies of heaven were following him, riding on white horses and dressed in fine linen, white and clean. Out of his mouth comes a sharp sword with which to strike down the nations. "He will rule them with an iron sceptre." He treads the winepress of the fury of the wrath of God Almighty. On his robe and on his thigh he has this name written: King of kings and Lord of Lords.

In this manuscript, the main elements of the diocesan coat of arms are to be seen, and there is thus tangible support for what common sense suggests: that the figure is that of our Lord as ruler of the nations. The image was common in Byzantine iconography as Christ the Pantocrator.

In 1626 Thomas Vicars, vicar of Cuckfield, wrote a sermon which he illustrated with references to the Book of Revelation and also to Hebrews chapter 4, verse 12, "For the word of God is living and active. Sharper than any double-edged sword, it penetrates even to dividing soul and spirit, joints and marrow; it judges the thoughts and attitudes of the heart." He dedicated his sermon to his father-in-law, the then Bishop of Chichester:

The subject of the sermon is your Coate of Armes. The most godly and fairest Armes that ever I or any in the world set his eyes upon. Christ Jesus the great Pastor and Bishop of our soules sits in your azure field in a faire long garment of beaten gold, with a sharpe two-edged sword in his mouth. Is it accounted a great grace, and that for Kings and Princes too, to carrie in their shields, a Lyon, an Eagle, a Lilly, a Harpe or such-like animal or artificial thing? How much more honour is it then I pray you to carrie Christ Jesus in your shield, who is Lord of Lords and King of Kings?

The position of the sword in the diocesan coat of arms is a matter that has raised some questions. In the newly drawn coat of arms the sword has been placed across the mouth, whereas previously and in the cathedral's coat of arms the sword is placed to the right of the mouth. It seems likely that medieval versions had the former position, while later generations have preferred the latter.

A medieval window in Bourges Cathedral, France, depicts Christ with seven seals in his right hand and seven stars in his left. The sword is clearly across his mouth, as it is in the depiction of the same scene on the great Apocalypse tapestry in the château at Angers, also in France. In both of these representations, however, the sword points to the viewer's left, the opposite way from the diocesan arms.

== Safeguarding ==
In 2011 the Archbishop of Canterbury appointed an inquiry into long-running child protection problems in the diocese. The interim inquiry report found that there had been "an appalling history" over two decades of child protection problems and that many children had suffered hurt and damage. Because of concerns that safeguarding still remained dysfunctional, Lambeth Palace took over the oversight of clergy appointments and the protection of children and vulnerable adults in the diocese. Previously Baroness Butler-Sloss had carried out a review of historic child sex abuse problems that had led to the conviction of a priest in 2008.

On 13 November 2012 two former clergymen of the diocese, including the former Bishop of Lewes, Peter Ball, were arrested by police investigating allegations of child sex abuse in the 1980s and 1990s. The arrests followed the submission of reports by a safeguarding consultant from Lambeth Palace to the police. A trial date of 5 October 2015 was set for Ball and former Brighton priest Vickery House. Ball was later sentenced to prison for offences against adult men, but the child abuse charges were left on file. Vickery House was convicted of sex offences in the 1970s and 1980s against a boy and three men, and jailed for six and a half years.

On 5 April 2013, Hove Crown Court convicted Michael Mytton and the Revd Keith Wilkie Denford of sexually assaulting boys between 1987 and 1994 when they had been at St John the Evangelist's Church, Burgess Hill, in the Chichester diocese, with Mytton as organist and Denford as vicar. The church had employed Mytton despite his having been forced to leave a parish in Uckfield in 1981 because he had been convicted of committing two acts of gross indecency with a 12-year-old boy. Denford was jailed for 18 months and Mytton was given a suspended jail term.

In July 2013, following a ruling by the General Synod, the Church of England formally apologised for past child abuse and the church's failure to prevent it.

In December 2013, a 56-year-old retired priest in the diocese was arrested on suspicion of indecency, indecent assault and cruelty in 1988 and 1989. In April 2015, Jonathan Graves was charged with indecent assault against a boy and two women, and child cruelty against the same boy.

On 12 June 2015, Hove Crown Court convicted retired priest Robert Coles of sex offences against a young boy about 40 years earlier. He was already serving an 8-year sentence for sex offences against three other young boys in West Sussex, between 31 and 38 years earlier, and an additional 16-month sentence was added.

== Sources ==
- "Diocese of South Saxons". Archived from the original on 10 August 2018.
- "Church of England Statistics 2002". Archived from the original on 3 February 2007.
- "Diocese of Chichester Website". Diocese of Chichester.
- "A Church Near You". Church of England.
- Tatton-Brown, Tim (1994). Mary Hobbs (ed.). The Medieval Fabric in Chichester Cathedral: An Historic Survey. Chichester: Phillimore. ISBN 0-85033-924-3.
