= St Mary's Church, Maidenhead =

St Mary's Church
- Borough Church of St Andrew and St Mary Magdalene
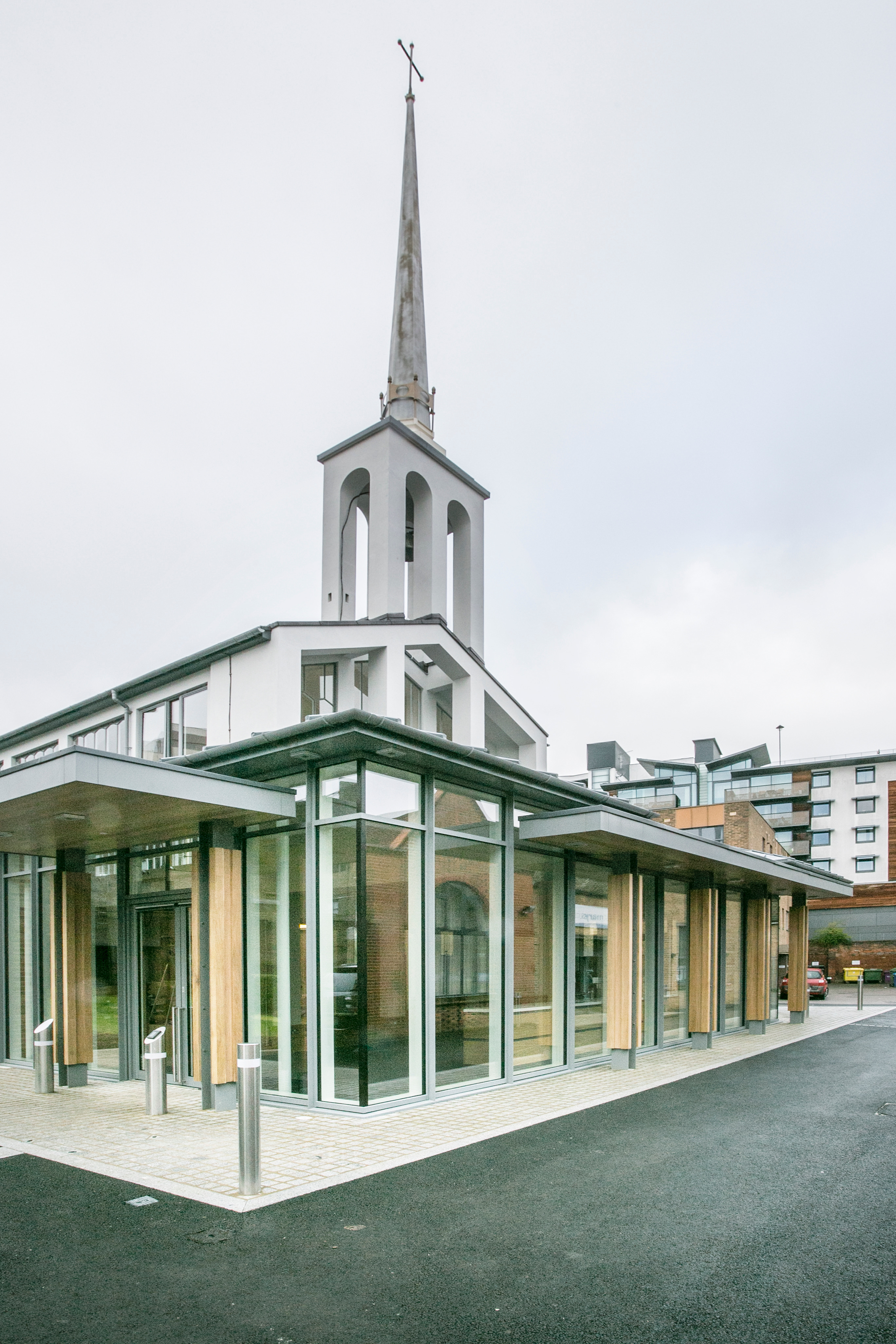
- Following refurbishment in 2018

- Location within England
- 51.5234°N 0.7185°W
- Location: Maidenhead, Berkshire
- Country: England
- Denomination: Church of England
- Churchmanship: Conservative Evangelical
- Website: stmarysmaidenhead.org

History
- Status: Parish church
- Founded: 1270
- Dedication: Andrew; Mary Magdalene
- Dedicated: 1451
- Consecrated: 1965

Architecture
- Functional status: Active
- Style: Modern

Administration
- Province: Province of Canterbury
- Diocese: Diocese of Oxford
- Archdeaconry: Archdeaconry of Berkshire
- Deanery: Maidenhead and Windsor
- Parish: Maidenhead St Andrew and St Mary Magdalene

Clergy
- Bishop: Rob Munro (AEO)
- Vicar: Jon Drake

St Mary's Church is a conservative evangelical Church of England parish church in the centre of Maidenhead, England. It has a congregation of mixed ages and backgrounds. The church aims "to know Jesus and make Jesus known."

== Buildings ==
There are several buildings on the St Mary's Church site. There is the church itself, the church halls, the 'Old Vic' (the vicarage from 1950 to 1992), the chapel and the Old Vic garden.

St Mary's Church has been rebuilt three times. Currently it is the fourth St Mary's Church. The fourth church was constructed in 1965. The spire is made of fibreglass and had to be hoisted into position by a crane. It had a major refurbishment starting in 2016, completing in 2018.

== Staff ==
Following the departure of the previous vicar, Revd Will Stileman, to All Souls Church, Langham Place, the current incumbent is Revd Jon Drake. The church employs two associate ministers, the Revds Ian Miller and Adam Curtis. In addition to the clergy, the church employs other ministry and administrative staff.

St Mary's receives alternative episcopal oversight from the Bishop of Ebbsfleet (currently Rob Munro), having passed a resolution in accordance with the House of Bishops’ Declaration on the Ministry of Bishops and Priests.
