= Evangelical Anglicanism =

Tradition within Anglicanism

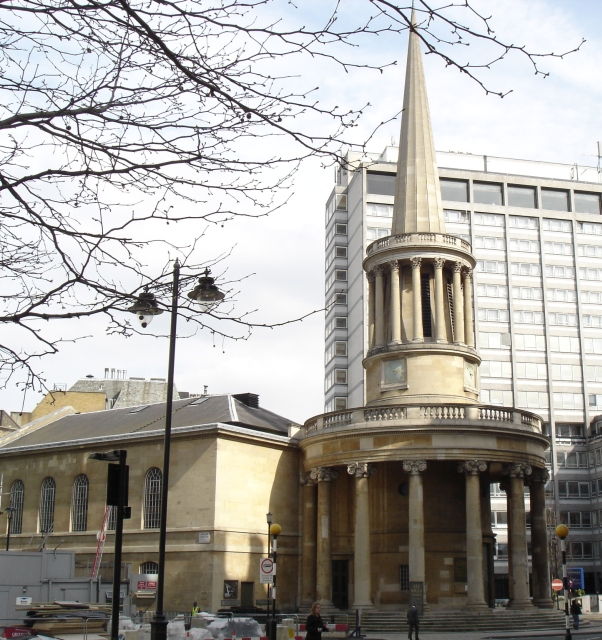
All Souls Church, Langham Place, is an evangelical congregation in the Church of England.

Evangelical Anglicanism or Evangelical Episcopalianism is a tradition or church party within Anglicanism that shares affinity with broader evangelicalism. Evangelical Anglicans share with other evangelicals the attributes of "conversionism, activism, biblicism and crucicentrism" identified by historian David Bebbington as central to evangelical identity. The emergence of evangelical churchmanship can be traced back to the First Great Awakening in America and the Evangelical Revival in Britain in the 18th century. In the 20th century, prominent figures have included John Stott and J. I. Packer.

In contrast to the high-church party, evangelicals emphasize experiential religion of the heart over the importance of liturgical forms. As a result, evangelicals are often described as being low church, but these terms are not always interchangeable because low church can also describe individuals or groups that are not evangelical.

== Description ==
In contrast to Anglo-Catholics, evangelical Anglicans stress the Reformed, Protestant nature of Anglicanism. Historically, evangelicals have come from both Calvinist as well as Arminian backgrounds.

According to J. I. Packer, evangelicals stress the supremacy of scripture; the majesty of Jesus Christ; the lordship of the Holy Spirit; the necessity of conversion (either instantaneous or gradual) and a new birth; the priority of evangelism and the importance of fellowship. The historian Gillis Harp adds that the substitutionary atonement of Jesus Christ is the focus of their preaching. Harp also claims that Evangelicals stress the need for a conversion experience, however Packer specifically denies that this is the case. Evangelical Anglicans have been particularly fierce critics of ritualism and sacerdotalism.

With respect to baptismal regeneration, evangelicals hold baptism to be "part of a process of regeneration, a step before eventual 'rebirth'." Evangelical Anglicans hold a Reformed view of baptism understood in light of covenant theology in which baptism seals or pledges the blessings of the New Covenant to the individual Christian. However, regeneration is not simultaneous with baptism. In the case of infant baptism, the sacrament "signifies and seals to them graces which they still need to receive later by faith."

Evangelicals maintain a Reformed view of Holy Communion, believing that Christ is spiritually or mystically present to the believer by faith, rather than corporeally present in the elements themselves. According to this view, known as receptionism, the body and blood of Christ are received spiritually by faith.

== By region ==
=== Church of England ===
==== 19th century ====
Evangelicalism emerged from the religious revivals of the 18th century. While previous movements in the Church of England had revolved around issues of church order and authority, evangelicals stressed lifestyle, doctrine and conduct. Evangelicals emphasized domestic religion, especially family prayer. Evangelical concern for the moral reform of society manifested itself in large scale support for missions, schools, charitable societies for the poor, and the formation of the Society for the Suppression of Vice. It was also demonstrated by political campaigns in the British Parliament, the most important being the movement to abolish slavery led by William Wilberforce. Wilberforce was a prominent figure in a network of evangelical social reformers nicknamed the Clapham Sect.

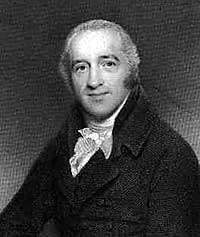
Charles Simeon (1759–1836) was a leading evangelical cleric

Charles Simeon was the most influential leader of evangelical Anglicanism. He established the Simeon Trust, a fund that became a major source of evangelical patronage. By the time of his death, the Trust controlled the livings of 42 churches, including Bath Abbey. He also helped to found the Church Missionary Society in 1799, which was meant to be an evangelical alternative to the high-church Society for the Propagation of the Gospel in Foreign Parts. The society sponsored mission work in India, Africa, and Australia. In 1804, the British and Foreign Bible Society was founded to provide Bibles in different languages to accompany the missionary work, though in 1831 there was a schism which led to the founding of the Trinitarian Bible Society.

Nineteenth-century evangelicals were fascinated with biblical prophecy as it related to future events, and some also promoted Christian Zionism, the belief in the restoration of the Jews to Palestine. The London Society for Promotion of Christianity Amongst the Jews (now the Church's Ministry Among Jewish People) was created in 1809. In the 1830s, the 7th Earl of Shaftesbury, a leading evangelical, helped persuade Lord Palmerston, the British Secretary of State for Foreign Affairs, to sponsor Jewish settlement. In 1841, Edward Bickersteth published The Restoration of the Jews to Their Own Land and the Final Blessedness of the Earth.

The first evangelical bishop, Henry Ryder, was appointed to Gloucester in 1815 by the Earl of Liverpool after initial objections that he was a "religious bishop". The second evangelical bishop, Charles Sumner, Bishop of Winchester, was not appointed until 1826, over 10 years later. His brother John later became Bishop of Chester and then Archbishop of Canterbury in 1848. The number of evangelical bishops grew afterwards, especially during Lord Palmerston's time as prime minister since he relied on Shaftesbury's advice when making appointments. In the latter half of the 19th century, the leading evangelical was J. C. Ryle, first Bishop of Liverpool. Ryle helped to found evangelical theological institutions such as Wycliffe Hall at the University of Oxford and Ridley Hall as alternatives to the diocesan-run colleges, which by this time were dominated by the ritualists.

Evangelical insistence on the necessity of conversion provoked controversy within the Church of England over the doctrine of baptismal regeneration. Evangelicals rejected this doctrine, a position summarized by the Bishop of Winchester, who wrote, "I must look, notwithstanding his baptism, for the Scriptural evidence of his being a child of God." The controversy came to a head in the late 1840s in what became known as the Gorham Judgment. In 1847, Henry Phillpotts, Bishop of Exeter, refused to induct George Cornelius Gorham as vicar of a parish in Devon on the grounds that Gorham did not believe in baptismal regeneration. Gorham appealed the case all the way to the Privy Council, which in 1850 ruled in Gorham's favour.

In 1844, a number of congregations separated from the Church of England. They formed the Free Church of England, a Protestant and reformed body, as a reaction to the ritualist movement.

==== 20th century ====
From the 1870s into the early 20th century, evangelicals came to feel increasingly marginalized as ritualism became more commonplace within the Church of England. As evangelicalism continued to lose ground to the high-church party, a split became apparent between conservative evangelicals and liberal evangelicals. Liberal evangelicals led by Vernon Storr coalesced into the Anglican Evangelical Group Movement. Their position was outlined in the 1923 collection of essays Liberal Evangelicalism, which argued that evangelicalism had been discredited and needed to move away from strict notions of penal substitutionary atonement and scriptural infallibility. Conservatives accused liberal evangelicals of being no different from the older broad church liberals that evangelicals had always opposed.

In 1922, disaffected evangelicals left the Church Missionary Society over moves to broaden the society's theological boundaries and established the Bible Churchmen's Missionary Society (now known as Crosslinks). Soon, there were BCMS missionaries in Africa, Burma, and among the Inuit. In 1925, what would become Trinity College in Bristol was established by the BCMS to train missionaries. Trinity, then known as Tyndale Hall, would maintain a conservative position, while other evangelical colleges like Ridley Hall would go in a more theologically open direction. The two later merged to form the present college.

The failure of the 1928 proposed Book of Common Prayer to be approved by Parliament was seen as a victory for evangelicals, though this was overturned when the ASB, and its successor Common Worship, were approved in the latter part of the twentieth century.

Beginning in the 1960s, evangelicals began to emerge from isolation. In response to Congregationalist minister Martyn Lloyd-Jones' call for the formation of a pan-evangelical denomination, John Stott of All Souls, Langham Place founded the Church of England Evangelical Council in 1960 to act as a collective voice of all evangelicals within the Church, and delivered a strong assertion of Anglican identity at the National Evangelical Anglican Congress in 1967. This produced a greater willingness to remain within the Church of England and to change it from within. Influential organisations include the Reform network and the Proclamation Trust, which have worked to oppose women's ordination and permissive attitudes toward homosexuality in the Church of England. Churchman, published by the Church Society, is an important journal for conservative evangelicals. The think tank Fulcrum and the journal Anvil represent the open evangelical perspective.

==== 21st century ====
As other church parties experienced decline in the 21st century, evangelicalism has seen a rise in influence and popularity within the Church of England. According to Peter Brierley, a researcher on church statistics, 40 per cent of Anglicans attended evangelical parishes. As of 2016, 70 percent of ordinands were reported to be evangelical, and 18 out of 42 dioceses had evangelical bishops. Justin Welby, Archbishop of Canterbury since 2013, is an evangelical with connections to Holy Trinity Brompton in London. Evangelical growth in recent years has been aided by church planting and urban evangelisation. However, some liberals within the church have criticized the growing influence of evangelicalism as a threat to the inclusive, broad church values of the Church of England.

In December 2014, it was announced that the suffragan see of Maidstone would be filled again in order to provide alternative episcopal oversight for particular members of the Church of England who take the conservative evangelical view on male headship and object to the ordination of female bishops. On 23 September 2015, Rod Thomas was consecrated Bishop of Maidstone. On 2 October 2022 Rod Thomas retired. He was replaced by Rob Munro, Bishop of Ebbsfleet in 2023.

=== Episcopal Church in the United States ===
==== 19th century ====
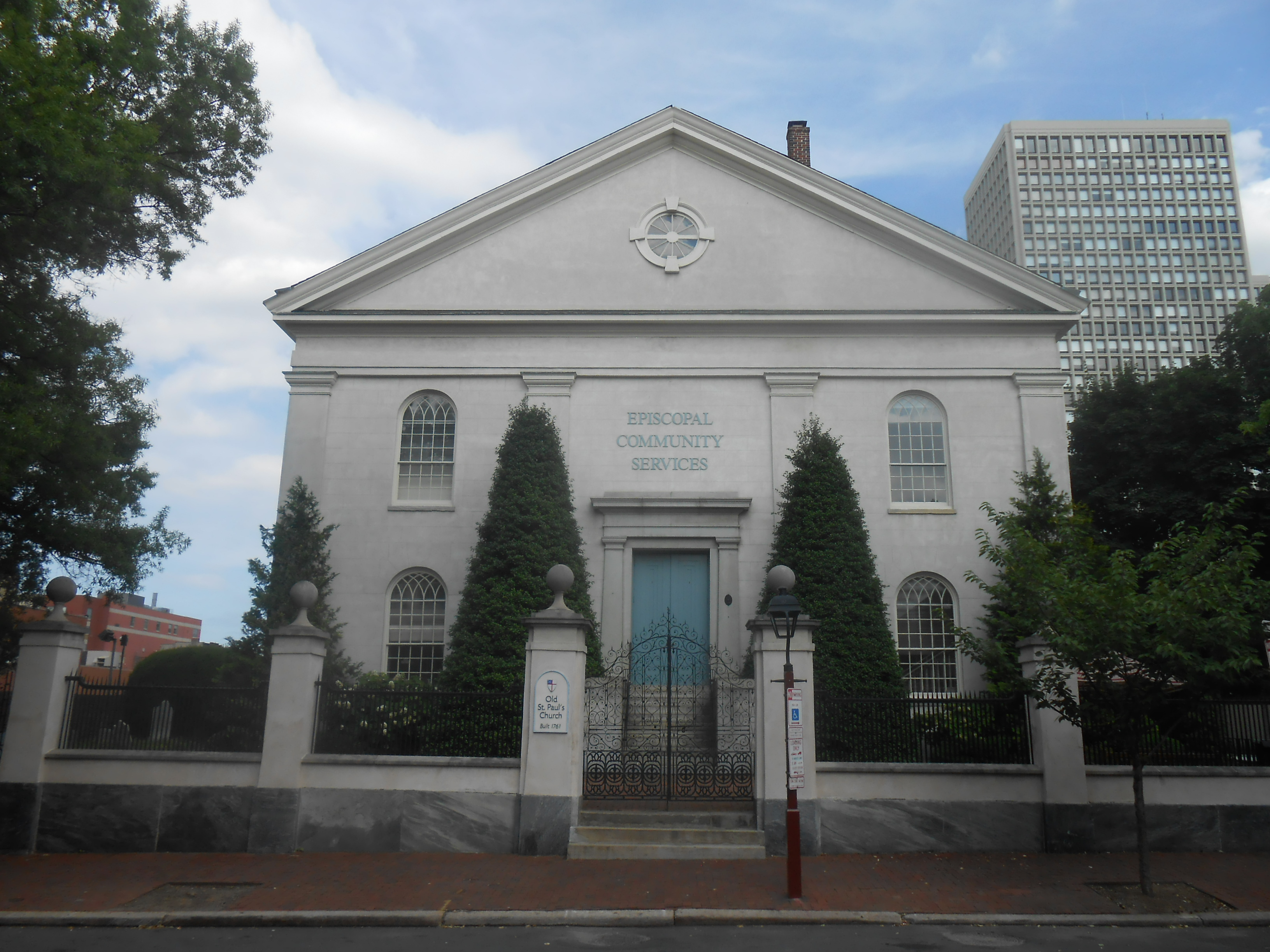
Old St. Paul's Church in Philadelphia (now Episcopal Community Services) was a prominent evangelical Episcopal church in the 19th century. Its ministers included Stephen Tyng.

In the 19th century, the newly organized Episcopal Church was divided between two competing church parties, the high-church party led by John Henry Hobart and the evangelical party (also simply called the low-church party). The evangelical party was influenced by their counterparts in England and included Wesleyans who chose to remain in the Episcopal Church rather than joining the Methodist Episcopal Church. Evangelical Anglicans, however, did not share the strong "sacramental emphasis" of the Methodists, who were also evangelicals.

Like evangelicals in other Protestant denominations, they stressed the need for a conversion experience and participated in the revivalism of the Second Great Awakening, holding revival meetings and prayer meetings. They also tended to disapprove of social amusements such as dancing, card-playing, and the theatre.

While the high-church party disapproved of participation in inter-denominational voluntary societies, evangelical Episcopalians strongly supported them. Leaders such as Alexander Viets Griswold, William Meade, James Milnor, Stephen Tyng and Charles McIlvaine participated in societies such as the American Bible Society, the American Tract Society, the American Sunday School Union, the American Colonization Society, the American Temperance Society and the American Seaman Friends Society. According to church historian William Manross, evangelicals often preached to the "outcast and the underprivileged", which made them more aware of social problems and, therefore, more enthusiastic supporters of efforts to reform antebellum America.

Participation in voluntary societies reflected evangelical Episcopalians' beliefs that every Christian had a responsibility to spread the gospel and righteousness in preparation for the millennial reign of Christ on earth. Like their English counterparts, millennial expectation fuelled an interest in biblical prophecy among evangelical Episcopalians. Bishop John P. K. Henshaw, Benjamin Allen (rector of Old St. Paul's in Philadelphia) and other Episcopal ministers published books or magazines dedicated to millennialism.

By 1844, two-thirds of Episcopal clergy were evangelical. Nevertheless, the growing influence of the Anglo-Catholic Oxford Movement on Episcopal Church leaders worried evangelicals. They experienced a loss of confidence in the church's institutions after 1844 when the church's General Convention refused to label the Oxford Movement a heresy. Their own attempts to stem the tide through heresy trials ultimately failed as well. In response, evangelicals chose to form their own distinctly evangelical Episcopal voluntary societies to promote education and evangelism, such as the Protestant Episcopal Society for the Promotion of Evangelical Knowledge (which later merged with what is now known as the Episcopal Evangelism Society) and the American Church Missionary Society (which was modelled on the English society).

After the American Civil War, the breach between evangelicals and high churchmen had deepened. While an older generation of evangelical leaders, such as McIlvaine, tried to preserve evangelical loyalty to the Episcopal Church, a younger generation was calling for schism and the creation of a distinctly evangelical church. In 1873, some of these evangelicals led by George David Cummins and Charles E. Cheney organized the Reformed Episcopal Church.

Towards the end of the 19th century, the old evangelical party would evolve into broad church liberalism. Broad church Episcopalians sought to promote theological openness and tolerance, as well as social ministry and higher criticism of the Bible. Bishop Thomas M. Clark is an example of a leading 19th-century evangelical who had become a broad churchman by the time of his death in 1903. However, it was younger evangelicals, those from evangelical families or who had been educated in evangelical Episcopal seminaries, who were most susceptible to liberalism. This was the case of leading broad churchman Bishop Phillips Brooks, who was educated at the evangelical Virginia Theological Seminary. Broad churchmen like Brooks preserved the old evangelical emphases on liturgical and ecumenical liberty and personal religious experience, but they rejected the core teachings of evangelical theology.

==== 20th century ====
The Fundamentalist–Modernist Controversy of the 1920s and 1930s had less of an impact on the Episcopal Church than in other Protestant denominations. Nevertheless, it did lead to a reconfiguration of Episcopal church parties. Broad churchmen with more evangelical leanings, such as Walter Russell Bowie and Bishop Edward L. Parsons began to identify as liberal evangelicals. These liberal evangelicals sought to embrace modern science while also having a personal relationship with God. Liberal evangelicals also advocated for closer ecumenical relationships and union with other Protestant churches.

Liberal evangelicals in the United States were influenced by liberal evangelicals in the Church of England. The difference between the American and English movements was that in the Episcopal Church the liberal evangelicals were the only evangelicals, whereas in England the liberals were countered by the conservative evangelicals.

By mid-century, there was no living memory of the 19th-century evangelicals, and Episcopalians were "reluctant" to acknowledge that they had ever existed. Beginning in the 1960s, however, conservative evangelicalism would re-emerge as an important force within the Episcopal Church. The evangelical revival in the Episcopal Church was part of a larger postwar evangelical resurgence known in North America as neo-evangelicalism, and it was promoted and supported by Anglicans from England, where evangelical Anglicanism had remained a vibrant tradition throughout the 20th century. The most influential voice from England was John Stott.

The new evangelicals would provide the strongest opposition to the liberal trajectory of the Episcopal Church, especially regarding progressive views on homosexuality. In the late 1980s, evangelicals began to form organizations aimed at promoting and defending their understanding of Anglican orthodoxy and changing liberal church policies. In 1996, Alden Hathaway, the Bishop of Pittsburgh, founded the American Anglican Council to represent evangelicals at the national level. Unable to alter the liberal program of the Episcopal Church, evangelical Episcopalians and their Anglo-Catholic allies looked to Anglican churches in the Global South for help in a process called Anglican realignment.

=== Anglican Church of Australia ===
In the Anglican Church of Australia, Calvinist evangelicalism is the dominant theological orientation of these dioceses:

- Anglican Diocese of Sydney
- Anglican Diocese of Tasmania
- Anglican Diocese of North West Australia
- Anglican Diocese of Armidale

Additionally, the following non-evangelical dioceses have evangelical bishops:

- Anglican Diocese of Bathurst (Mark Calder)
- Anglican Diocese of Canberra and Goulburn (Stuart Robinson, Mark Short)
- Anglican Diocese of the Northern Territory (Greg Anderson)
- Anglican Diocese of Bendigo (Matthew Brain)
- Anglican Diocese of Rockhampton (Peter Grice)

Two of Australia's largest theological colleges are Anglican and Evangelical: Moore Theological College in Sydney and Ridley College in Melbourne.

=== Africa ===
In Africa, evangelicalism is the primary theological orientation of the Church of Uganda, and it is low church in liturgical style. This is due largely to the fact that in much of East Africa Anglicanism was introduced by the evangelical Church Missionary Society. The evangelical character of the Anglican church in Uganda, as well as in the Anglican Church of Rwanda, was strengthened by the East African Revival of the 1930s and 1940s.

The growth of Pentecostalism in Africa has pushed the church in a more charismatic direction. It is not unusual for church services to feature spontaneous prayer, greater leadership from lay people, and praise and worship music.

== See also ==
- Anglican Church in North America
- Fellowship of Confessing Anglicans
- GAFCON
- Ridley Theological College
- Conservative Evangelicalism in the United Kingdom
