= St Peter and St Paul, Dagenham =

Coordinates: 51°32′23″N 0°9′43″E

- Dagenham Parish Church of Saint Peter and Saint Paul
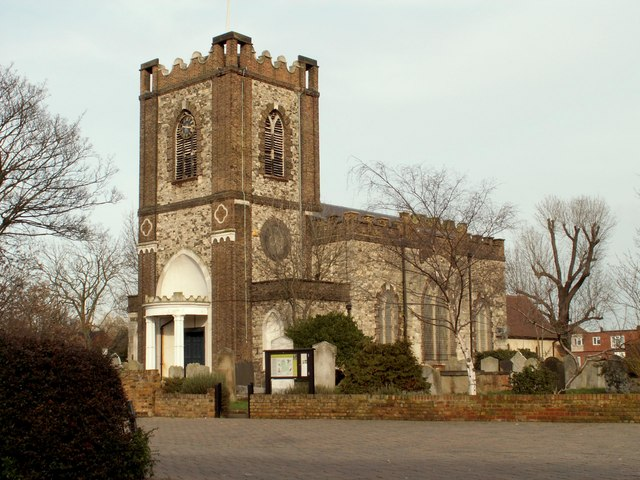
- St Peter and St Paul, Dagenham
- Location: Church Lane, Dagenham, Greater London, RM10 9UL
- Country: England
- Denomination: Church of England
- Previous denomination: Roman Catholic
- Churchmanship: Conservative Evangelical
- Website: dagenhamparishchurch.org

History
- Status: Active
- Dedication: Saint Peter; Saint Paul

Architecture
- Functional status: Parish Church
- Heritage designation: Grade II* listed building

Administration
- Province: Province of Canterbury
- Diocese: Diocese of Chelmsford
- Archdeaconry: Archdeaconry of Barking
- Deanery: Deanery of Barking & Dagenham
- Parish: Dagenham

Clergy
- Bishop: The Rt Revd Rod Thomas (AEO)
- Vicar: The Revd Joel Edwards

St. Peter and St. Paul, known commonly as Dagenham Parish Church, is a Church of England parish church in the London Borough of Barking and Dagenham, England, formerly part of Essex. It is of medieval origin, largely rebuilt at the beginning of the nineteenth century.

== History ==
The St. Peter and St. Paul was built in the early 13th century on a site given by Barking Abbey.

The original building was constructed with Kentish rag stone, brought across the River Thames. The North Chapel is described as "new" in a will of 1475, and the two bays separating the chancel and north chapel have moulded form centred arches, typical of late 15th century architecture.

During the reformation the church was plundered and spoiled, and most of its treasures confiscated. With the aid of the Fanshawe family, the building was later restored and strengthened. A stone buttress was added to the outside of the east wall, which can still be seen.

By 1770 the church was in a dangerous condition due to the state of the foundations of the tower, causing it to press on the west and south portions of the nave. Temporary repairs were carried out and plans made to rebuild the tower at a cost of £1,176.5s. Before this could be done, however, the tower collapsed on the morning of the second Sunday in Advent in the year 1800, destroying the nave and south aisle. A service would normally have been taking place at the time, but the vicar was late arriving with the keys and they were still waiting outside. The whole church, except for chancel and north chapel had to be rebuilt. The new work was carried out in stone rubble, re-using the old material, and brown brick. The reconstruction was completed by 1805. The new tower was built with a spire, since removed.

The architect of the rebuilding was William Mason, who had his name carved boldly on the arch over the west door. Ian Nairn described Mason's version of the gothic revival style as "Marvellous nonsense" and "pure froth, without a care in the world".

A peal of six bells was cast for the newly constructed tower in 1804 by Thomas Mears of Whitechapel. The tenor was inscribed with a long list names of trustees and others who had had a part in rebuilding the church, including that of the Reverend Henry Morice, vicar of Dagenham from 1801 to 1807. In 1933 the bells were recast by Gillet and Johnston of Croydon and hung in a new timber frame. Five years later, two new bells were added, cast by John Taylor and Co. of Loughborough, to complete the octave.

In 1841 a new gallery was added, and in 1844 an organ installed in the gallery where the village orchestra had once performed. By 1877 it was decided to lower the floor of the Nave by 15 inches - the reason the windows seem so high today. At the same time the organ was moved to the chancel, the pulpit replaced and the entire church refurnished with deal benches. The church was re-roofed in 1913 and the spire removed in 1921.

In 1938 electricity replaced the gas lamps, the organ pipes were placed in the gallery, and pumped by electricity, and the organ console enlarged.

On 28 June 1954, the church was designated a Grade II* listed building.

== Present day ==
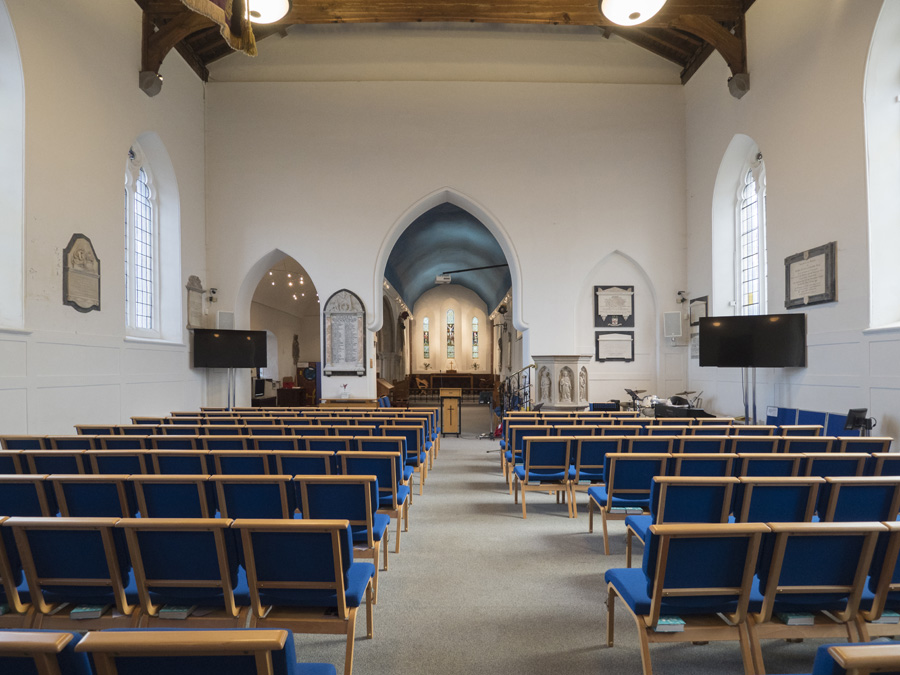
Interior of the church

The church continues to be active, meeting each Sunday at 10:30 am, as well as having a range of mid-week groups.

The parish is within the Conservative Evangelical tradition of the Church of England. It has passed resolutions to reject the ordination of women, and receives alternative episcopal oversight from the Bishop of Maidstone (currently Rod Thomas).
