= Church of England Evangelical Council =

- Abbreviation: CEEC
- Established: 1960
- Founder: John Stott
- Legal status: Charity
- Purpose: Promotion and unity of evangelical Anglicanism
- Region served: England
- President: Julian Henderson
- National Director: John Dunnett
- Affiliations: Church of England
- Website: www.ceec.info

The Church of England Evangelical Council (CEEC) is an association of mainly conservative evangelical Anglican members of the Church of England. It self-describes as the collective voice of the "vast majority" of evangelicals within the Church of England, and states its aim "to promote and maintain orthodox evangelical theology and ethics at the heart of the Church of England". It has been described as theologically conservative. It was founded in 1960 by the Anglican clergyman John Stott. It is registered with the Charity Commission for England and Wales: amongst its stated activities is the "promotion of consultation between evangelical Anglican leaders" and "to encourage and interact with evangelicals within the Church of England".

== Membership ==
Members of the council include bishops, representatives from mission societies and associations, and laypeople. Organisations affiliated with the council include Anglican Mainstream, Anglican Mission in England, Church Mission Society, Church Pastoral Aid Society, Church Society, Crosslinks, Reform, Fulcrum, and New Wine. The organisations include groups that are conservative evangelical, open evangelical and charismatic in orientation.

== Leadership ==
From 2000 to 2014, Wallace Benn, the Bishop of Lewes, was president of the CEEC. From 2021 to 2023, Keith Sinclair served as national director.

Since May 2023, the National Director of the CEEC has been Canon John Dunnett, formerly Head of the Church Pastoral Aid Society. Its president is currently Julian Henderson, Bishop of Blackburn.

== Reaction to same-sex blessings ==
In December 2023, the House of Bishops of the Church of England authorised a "selection of readings and prayers of thanksgiving, dedication and asking for God’s blessing for same-sex couples", while also noting that the Church's understanding of marriage "remains as a lifelong, faithful and exclusive covenant between one man and one woman".

In reaction, the CEEC has proposed "alternative spiritual oversight" (not to be confused with the Church of England's official alternative episcopal oversight offering) for those clergy "who now feel themselves to be in impaired fellowship with their diocesan bishop". This will be provided by "orthodox evangelical" honorary assistant bishops (Julian Henderson, Rod Thomas, and Pete Broadbent) and non-episcopal "overseers". This provision is proposed as a stepping stone towards official differentiation and a permanent "new structural arrangement". In July 2024, the CEEC commissioned its first group of 20 overseers including bishops Julian Henderson, Henry Scriven, Keith Sinclair, Pete Broadbent, Rod Thomas, and Rob Munro, with Mike Hill to be commissioned at a later date. Two of the initial twenty overseers are ordained women.

The CEEC also established the "Ephesian Fund" "to support orthodox Anglican ministry when in good conscience they might otherwise withdraw or reduce their giving to their parish church as a result of their bishop’s support for the Prayers of Love and Faith initiative".
