= John Richards (bishop of Ebbsfleet) =

The Right Reverend John Richards
- Bishop of Ebbsfleet (PEV)
- Province: Province of Canterbury
- In office: 1994 to 1998
- Successor: Michael Houghton

Orders
- Ordination: 1959 (deacon); 1960 (priest)
- Consecration: 29 April 1994

Personal details
- Born: 4 October 1933 Reading, Berkshire, England
- Died: 9 November 2003 (aged 70) Lewdown, Devon, England
- Denomination: Anglicanism
- Education: Reading School
- Alma mater: Sidney Sussex College, Cambridge; Ely Theological College

John Richards (4 October 1933 – 9 November 2003) was a British Anglican bishop. He was the first Bishop of Ebbsfleet from 1994 to 1998.

== Early life and education ==
Richards was born on 4 October 1933. He was educated a two all-boys grammar schools: the Reading School and Wyggeston Grammar School for Boys in Leicester. He read history and theology at Sidney Sussex College, Cambridge. He did his National Service in the Royal Artillery, and was preparing for deployment to the Egypt until the Suez Crisis ended in between the time his kitbag was dispatched and his personnel flight was due to take off for Egypt. He then trained for ordination at Ely Theological College, an Anglo-Catholic theological college, between 1957 and 1959.

== Ordained ministry ==
Richards was ordained in the Church of England as a deacon in 1959 and as a priest in 1960. His first post was a curacy at St Thomas' Exeter. Following this he was the Rector of Cookbury then the Rural Dean of Holsworthy. From 1974 until 1981, he was the Rector of Heavitree. He served as Archdeacon of Exeter from 1981 to 1994.

Richards was consecrated bishop on 29 April 1994 at St Paul's Cathedral, by George Carey, Archbishop of Canterbury. From 1994 to 1998, he served as the first Bishop of Ebbsfleet. Ebbsfleet is a provincial episcopal visitor in the Province of Canterbury for those who feel unable to accept the ordination of women. Richards himself was a classical Anglican, rather than a traditional Anglo-Catholic or a conservative evangelical.

He died on 9 November 2003.

Church of England titles
Preceded by Inaugural appointment	Bishop of Ebbsfleet; 1994 –1998	Succeeded by Michael Houghton
