= St John's Church, Hartford =

Coordinates: 53.2458°N 2.5441°W

St John the Baptist Church, Hartford
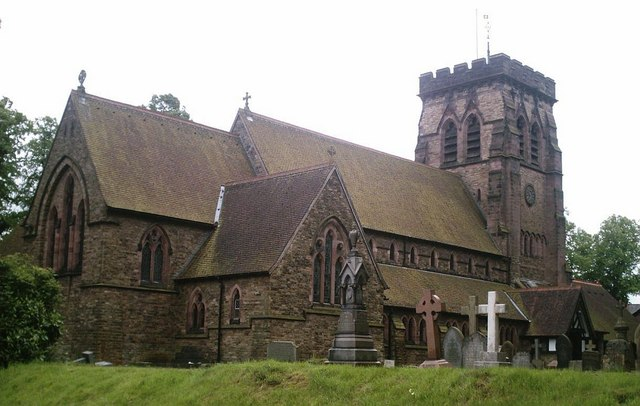
- St John the Baptist Church, Hartford, from the southeast

- Location in Cheshire
- OS grid reference: SJ 638,722
- Location: Hartford, Cheshire
- Country: England
- Denomination: Anglican
- Churchmanship: Conservative Evangelical
- Website: St John, Hartford

History
- Status: Parish church
- Founded: 1824
- Dedication: St John the Baptist
- Consecrated: 24 June 1875

Architecture
- Functional status: Active
- Heritage designation: Grade II
- Designated: 18 July 1986
- Architect: John Douglas
- Architectural type: Church
- Style: Gothic Revival
- Groundbreaking: 29 October 1873
- Construction cost: £12,508 (£1.41 million in 2025)

Specifications
- Materials: Buff and red sandstone, red tile roof

Administration
- Province: York
- Diocese: Chester
- Archdeaconry: Chester
- Deanery: Middlewich
- Parish: St John, Hartford

Clergy
- Vicar: Rev Mike Smith

St John the Baptist Church is in the village of Hartford, Cheshire, England. The church is recorded in the National Heritage List for England as a designated Grade II listed building, and is the Anglican parish church of Hartford and Greenbank. It is in the diocese of Chester, the archdeaconry of Chester and the deanery of Middlewich.

== History ==
The first church on the site was consecrated in 1824. Following this the population grew and the church became too small. In 1873 it was decided that a new and larger church was needed. The new church was designed by John Douglas. The foundation stone was laid on 29 October 1873. The new church was consecrated by William Jacobson, Bishop of Chester, on 24 June 1875. At this time, the church consisted of the chancel and nave with its porches and the foundations of the tower. The tower, also designed by John Douglas, was then added and this was dedicated by William Stubbs, Bishop of Chester, on 14 April 1887. On 20 June 1897 a ring of six bells was dedicated. The total cost of the church was £12,508 (£1.41 million in 2025). In the 1920s a choir vestry was added to the east wall. In 1990 the church pipe organ was replaced by an electronic organ. In 1993 the roof was refurbished and during the following year the pews were replaced by chairs. In 1997–98 an extension was added to the west end of the church to provide extra seating, toilets and a kitchen.

== Architecture ==
=== Exterior ===
The church is built in buff sandstone with red sandstone dressings and a red tile roof. Its plan consists of a five-bay nave with a clerestory, north and south aisles, a two-bay chancel with a vestry to the south and a chapel to the north, north and south porches and a west tower. The tower is in four stages with a stair turret at the southwest corner which rises higher than the tower. The parapet is embattled. The tower is around 70 feet (21 m) high.

=== Interior ===
Internally the plaster and wooden reredos depicts the Last Supper in a Gothic gilded setting. The authors of the Buildings of England series describe the interior as being "altogether interesting, with a primitive look", commenting in particular that the two sides of the chancel are different. The main entrance to the church is now through the west extension to the church.

== External features ==
The churchyard contains ten war graves of service personnel, three of World War I and seven of World War II.

== Present day ==
The church continues to be an active parish church in the Evangelical tradition, and regular services are held. In addition to Sunday services, the church has a busy mid-week programme and runs a wide variety of groups, cafes and community activities. In October 2009 work started to demolish and replace the church hall. It was replaced by St John's Church Centre, which opened in November 2010. The Church Centre is primarily used for church activities, but is also in frequent use by community and other groups.

The parish is within the conservative evangelical tradition of the Church of England, and it has passed resolutions to reject the ordination of women as presbyters (priests). In the 1990s, its clergy included future Bishop of Ebbsfleet Rob Munro.

== See also ==
- Listed buildings in Hartford, Cheshire
- List of new churches by John Douglas
