= Jonathan Goodall =

Roman Catholic priest (born 1961)

The Reverend Jonathan Goodall
- Parish priest
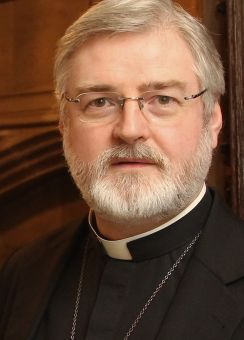
- Church: Roman Catholic Church
- Diocese: Diocese of Westminster
- Appointed: 25 February 2022
- Previous posts: Bishop of Ebbsfleet (CofE; 2013–2021)

Orders
- Ordination: 1 July 1990 (Anglican priest); 12 March 2022 (Catholic priest) by Richard Harries (Anglican); Vincent Nichols (Catholic)
- Consecration: 25 September 2013 by Justin Welby

Personal details
- Born: 1961 (age 64–65)
- Denomination: Roman Catholicism; Anglicanism (formerly)
- Spouse: Sarah Hicks (m. 1987)
- Children: 2
- Education: Royal Holloway, University of London; Wycliffe Hall, Oxford

Jonathan Michael Goodall (born 1961) is a British Roman Catholic priest and a former Church of England bishop. From 2013 to 2021, he was Bishop of Ebbsfleet, a suffragan bishop who is the provincial episcopal visitor in the western half of the Province of Canterbury for those "within the spectrum of Anglican teaching and tradition" who are "unable to receive the ministry of women as bishops or priests". He was ordained a Catholic priest on 12 March 2022.

== Early life ==
Goodall was born in 1961 in Yorkshire, England. He studied music at Royal Holloway College, University of London, before working in publishing. He trained for ordination at Wycliffe Hall, Oxford, an evangelical Anglican theological college.

== Church of England ==
He was ordained a deacon at Petertide 1989 (2 July) at St Mary the Virgin's Church, Aylesbury, by Richard Harries, Bishop of Oxford. He was ordained a priest the Petertide following (1 July 1990) at Christ Church Cathedral, Oxford, also by Richard Harries. Goodall served his title in the Bicester Team Ministry from 1989 to 1992; in the latter two years he was also assistant chaplain at HMP Bullingdon. He was a minor canon and sacrist of Westminster Abbey from 1992 to 1998, after which he served as research assistant and chaplain to the bishops of Gibraltar until 2005. From 2005 until his ordination and consecration to the episcopate he was chaplain and ecumenical secretary to the archbishops of Canterbury.

=== Episcopal ministry ===
On 2 August 2013, Goodall was announced as the next Bishop of Ebbsfleet, the provincial episcopal visitor (PEV) for the Province of Canterbury. On 25 September 2013, he was consecrated a bishop by Justin Welby, the Archbishop of Canterbury, at Westminster Abbey.

Goodall was a member of the Council of Bishops of The Society.

== Roman Catholic Church ==
On 3 September 2021, the Archbishop of Canterbury, Justin Welby, accepted Goodall's resignation from the See of Ebbsfleet following his decision to seek "full communion" with the Catholic Church after a "long period of prayer". Goodall is the second Bishop of Ebbsfleet who resigned in order to become a Roman Catholic. He was received into the Catholic Church at Archbishop’s House, Westminster, on 8 September 2021.

Goodall was ordained a Catholic priest on 12 March 2022 by Cardinal Vincent Nichols at Westminster Cathedral. He is incardinated in the Diocese of Westminster and is parish priest of St William of York Catholic Church, Stanmore.

== Personal life ==
Goodall married Sarah Hicks at Bradford, West Yorkshire, in 1987. They have two children; Thomas (born 1989) and Anna-Mary (born 1994).

== Styles ==
- Mr Jonathan Goodall (1961–1989)
- The Reverend Jonathan Goodall (1989–2013)
- The Right Reverend Jonathan Goodall (2013–2021)
- Mr Jonathan Goodall (2021–2022)
- The Reverend Jonathan Goodall (2022–present)

Church of England titles
Preceded by Jonathan Baker	Bishop of Ebbsfleet; 2013–2021	Succeeded by Rob Munro
