= Rob Munro (bishop) =

Church of England bishop

The Right Reverend Rob Munro
- Bishop of Ebbsfleet (PEV)
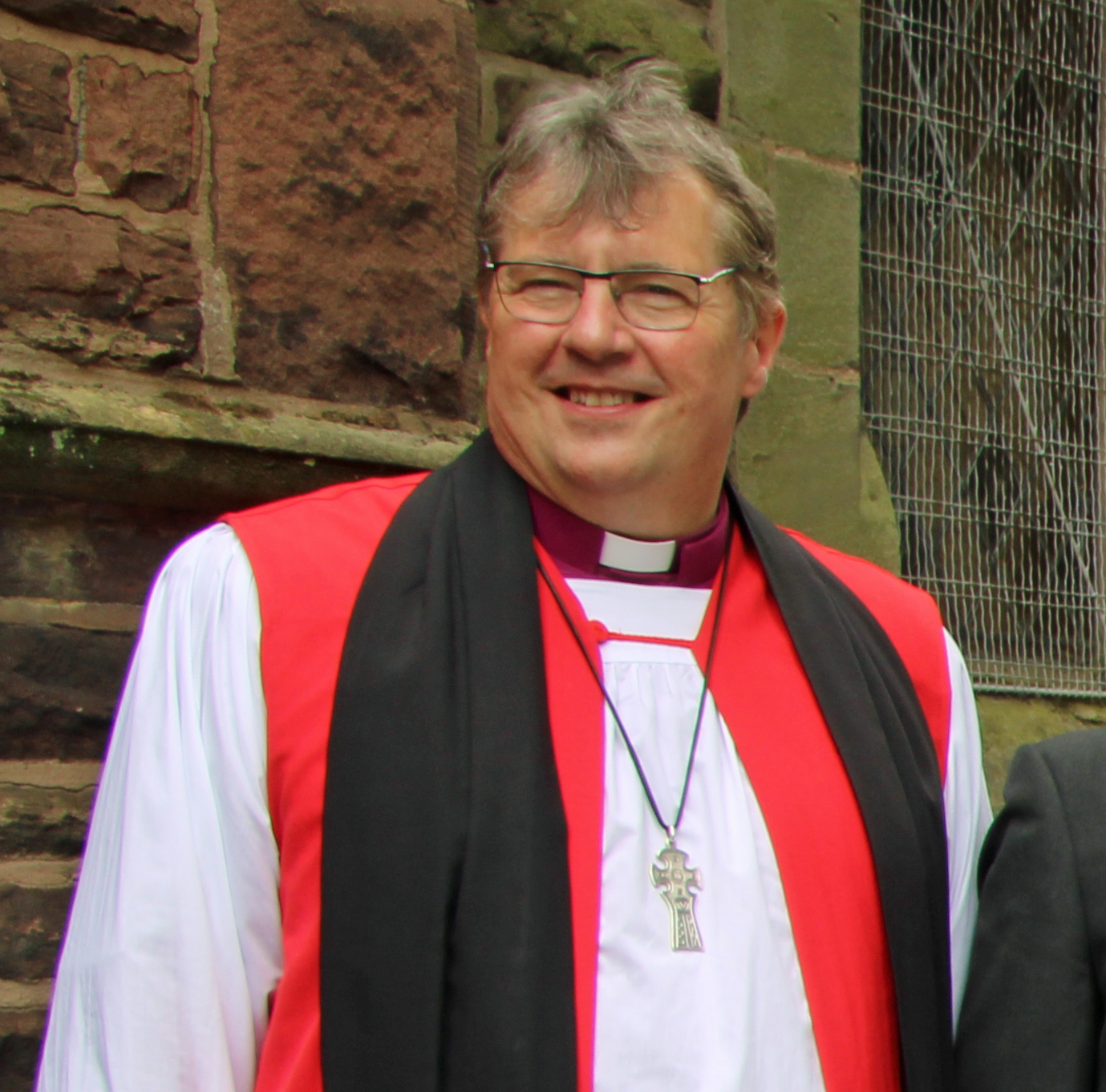
- Munro in 2023
- Church: Church of England
- Diocese: Canterbury
- In office: 2023–present
- Predecessor: Rod Thomas (as Bishop of Maidstone, PEV for conservative evangelicals); Jonathan Goodall (as Bishop of Ebbsfleet)
- Other post: Honorary assistant bishop in 10 dioceses (2023–present)
- Previous posts: Rector, St Mary's Cheadle (2003–2022)

Orders
- Ordination: 1993 (deacon); 1994 (priest)
- Consecration: 2 February 2023 by Justin Welby

Personal details
- Born: Robert Speight Munro; 8 May 1963 (age 63) Manchester
- Denomination: Anglicanism
- Spouse: Sarah
- Children: 3
- Education: University of Bristol; University of Manchester; Oak Hill Theological College; Reformed Theological Seminary

Robert Speight Munro (born 8 May 1963) is a British bishop in the Church of England. Since 2023, he has been Bishop of Ebbsfleet, the provincial episcopal visitor for conservative evangelical members and parishes of the church.

== Early life and education ==
Munro was born on 8 May 1963 in Manchester, England. He was raised as an atheist and converted to Christianity through the youth ministry of St Mary's Cheadle. Munro received a degree in maths at the University of Bristol. After university, he moved to London to study in the ministry training scheme at All Souls Langham Place, then known as All Souls College of Applied Theology. While at All Souls, Munro taught part-time at All Souls School. He returned to Manchester for teacher training at the University of Manchester and taught maths and physical education in Hazel Grove.

After a call to ordained ministry, Munro trained for ordination at Oak Hill College, a conservative evangelical theological college. He graduated with a Bachelor of Arts (BA) degree in theology and pastoral studies in 1993. He later studied for a doctorate from the Reformed Theological Seminary in the United States, graduating with a Doctor of Ministry (DMin) degree in 2008.

== Ordained ministry ==
Munro was ordained in the Church of England as a deacon in 1993 and as a priest in 1994. He first served his curacy at St John's Church, Hartford, in the Diocese of Chester. In 1997, he became rector of St Wilfrid's Church, Davenham, and in 2003 he returned to St Mary's Cheadle with St Cuthbert's as rector. He was additionally rural dean for Cheadle from 2016 to 2023.

In addition to his service in parish ministry, Munro held several positions in church leadership, including: chairman of the House of Clergy in the Diocese of Chester; an elected member of the General Synod of the Church of England from 2005 to 2022; a member of the Dioceses' Commission; and a council member of the Latimer Trust, the Church of England Evangelical Council and the Church Society. As a leader of the Fellowship of Word and Spirit (FWS), Munro supported the 2018 merger of FWS and Reform into the Church Society to unite English conservative evangelicals.

=== Episcopacy ===
In September 2022, Munro was announced as the next Bishop of Ebbsfleet, taking over the portfolio of alternative episcopal oversight held by the retired Bishop of Maidstone, Rod Thomas. On 2 February 2023, Munro was consecrated a bishop by Justin Welby at Canterbury Cathedral during the same service as Jane Mainwaring and Martin Gainsborough. The women bishops present did not take part in the laying on of hands for Munro, and Welby was only assisted by two other male bishops as co-consecrators (Mark Tanner, Bishop of Chester, and Jonathan Gibbs, Bishop of Rochester).

At the time of Munro's consecration, 148 resolution churches had passed resolutions requesting alternative episcopal oversight from the Bishop of Maidstone or his successor.

As of October 2024, Munro is an honorary assistant bishop in 10 dioceses: Blackburn, Sheffield, London, Oxford, Chelmsford, Chester, Durham, Southwark, Peterborough and Bath and Wells.

=== Views ===
Munro came into office as the General Synod was discussing Anglican bishops' approval (through the Living in Love and Faith process) of same-sex blessings in the Church of England and revisiting the restrictions imposed on gay clergy in same-sex marriages or civil partnerships. Munro commented that the General Synod debate:

"could threaten to break our unity on the doctrine of marriage, redefine our sanctity with respect to holiness and sexual activity, undermine our catholicity having little obvious regard for the wider Anglican Communion or beyond, and jeopardis[e] our apostolicity with respect to the clear teaching of Scripture. [...] Our received doctrine of marriage, in accordance with Scripture, is that '[...] the union of one man and one woman marriage is in its nature a union permanent and lifelong, for better for worse, till death them do part, of one man with one woman, to the exclusion of all others on either side" (Canon B30), and that includes understanding that 'sexual intercourse, as an expression of faithful intimacy, properly belongs within marriage exclusively' (1999 House of Bishops teaching document Marriage: A Teaching Document). Any move away from this understanding will have serious consequences for our Anglican communion and our mission. It is a serious concern that some recent public pronouncements appear to be at variance with this."

In December 2023, following the General Synod vote to commend and the subsequent introduction of prayers and blessings for same-sex relationships, he expressed his "great sorrow" and stated that it was a "serious error" that risks "misleading them about issues of sin and salvation". In a letter to the clergy under his supervision, Munro strongly recommended against the use of the new prayers, arguing that they have questionable legal status, are a potential confusion of Biblical teachings, and lack clear guidance for conscience; however, he also invited the clergy not to leave the Church of England and offered spiritual advice to those who may need it following the decision.

== Personal life ==
Munro is married to Sarah; they have three adult children.

Church of England titles
Preceded by Jonathan Goodall as Bishop of Ebbsfleet Rod Thomas as PEV for complementarian parishes	Bishop of Ebbsfleet; 2023–present	Incumbent
