= Hartford Bridge =

Hartford Bridge may refer to:

- Hartford Bridge, Cheshire, a bridge in Cheshire, England
- RAF Hartford Bridge, former name of Royal Air Force Blackbushe, Hampshire, England
- Hartford Bridge or Bulkeley Bridge, over the Connecticut River in Hartford, Connecticut, United States

== See also ==
- Hartfordbridge, a small village in Hampshire, England
- Hertford bridge or Bridge of Sighs, Hertford College, Oxford, England
- West Hartford Bridge, carrying Town Highway 14 across the White River, West Hartford, Vermont, United States
