= Anglican Mainstream =

English conservative Christian organisation

- Abbreviation: AM
- Formation: 2004
- Type: Anglican realignment Social conservatism
- Headquarters: Eynsham, Oxfordshire, England
- Convenor: Philip Giddings
- Affiliations: Global Anglican Future Conference; Christian Concern; Christian Institute
- Website: anglicanmainstream.org

Anglican Mainstream is a conservative Anglican organisation from the Church of England. It describes itself as "a community within the Anglican Communion committed to promote, teach and maintain the Scriptural truths on which the Anglican Church was founded". It is best known through its website, which posts items of interest or concern to its constituency. The convenor of the organization's UK steering committee is Philip Giddings.

== Britain and Ireland ==
It brings together Anglicans in the British Isles who are concerned to maintain a traditional position on controversial issues. Participating organisations include evangelical groups in England, Scotland, Wales and Ireland, such as Reform, Church Society, the Church of England Evangelical Council, the New Wine network, the Scottish Anglican Network and mission agencies. It has close links with similar groups in North America and South Africa.

== Anglican realignment ==
Anglican Mainstream is also involved in partnering with growing churches in the developing world through Anglican International Development (AID). It has strong links with the Fellowship of Confessing Anglicans, and supports the Anglican realignment and the Global Anglican Future Conference (GAFCON).

== Social conservatism ==
Anglican Mainstream is concerned about a number of social issues including abortion and end of life issues, the status of marriage and family, evangelism, the cultural challenge of secular society and general Anglican church life in Britain and overseas. Of all the issues with which it is concerned, its stance on issues of sexuality has drawn controversy, particularly its support for abstinence from homosexual activity and the ex-gay movement, which it considers to be a minority group often ignored or silenced. Liberal pro-LGBTQ+ rights groups such as Changing Attitude have been particularly opposed to Anglican Mainstream, especially over their scientific stance that sexual orientation is an unalterable fact of human nature.

In 2012, Anglican Mainstream was part of a coalition of Christian groups intending to run a two-week campaign in which some London buses would carry an advertisement reading "Not gay! Post-gay, ex-gay and proud. Get over it!" in the same style as adverts produced by Stonewall, the gay rights group. The intention was to draw attention to the existence of ex-gays and the possibility of change, a claim which is contradicted by mainstream psychologists. After receiving appropriate permissions the campaign was then prohibited by London's mayor, Boris Johnson, because of the offence he believed it would cause.

== See also ==
- Reform (Anglican)
- Core Issues Trust
- Mediawatch-UK
