= Philip Giddings =

Philip Giddings is a British retired political scientist and academic, specialising in parliamentary government. He is a lecturer in politics at the University of Reading. He is also a lay leader in the Church of England, and heads the conservative evangelical Anglican movement called Anglican Mainstream.

== Early life and education ==
Giddings earned his DPhil degree at Oxford University.

== Career ==
=== Academic career ===
In 1972, Giddings joined the staff at the University of Reading as a lecturer in politics. There, he was Warden of Mansfield Hall. He was later promoted to senior lecturer. Before his retirement, he served as director of the university's Centre for Ombudsman and Governance Studies and Head of its School of Politics and International Relations. He retired from academia in 2011.

=== Church of England ===
In his position as leader of the House of Laity in the Church of England, Giddings was instrumental in the defeat of a motion for the ordination of women as bishops in late 2012. Giddings' speech against that motion led a priest from Leicester to propose a motion of no-confidence in Giddings on the grounds that it was "a significant contributor to the reputational damage the Church of England is already suffering at the hands of the press". The no-confidence motion was defeated in January 2013, though Giddings said that the vote of a sizeable minority against him would lead him to consider "how to proceed from here".

Giddings also took a stand against the proposed appointment of Jeffrey John as Bishop of Reading, saying that "practising homosexuals cannot hold a position of leadership" in the Church of England. John, however, has affirmed that he is celibate.

== Honours ==
In 2016, he was awarded the Canterbury Cross for Services to the Church of England by the Archbishop of Canterbury, Justin Welby, "for sustained excellence in voluntary service to the Church".

== Selected publications ==
- Parliamentary Socialisation: Learning the Ropes or Determining Behaviour?, 2011
- When Gordon Took the Helm: The Palgrave Review of British Politics 2007-2008, 2008
- The Future of Parliament: Issues for a New Century, 2005
- Britain in the European Union: Law, Policy and Parliament, 2004
- Westminster and Europe: The Impact of the European Union on the Westminster Parliament, 1996
- Parliamentary Accountability: A Study of Parliament and Executive Agencies, 1994
- Marketing Boards and Ministers, 1974
