= Rod Thomas (bishop) =

Church of England bishop

The Right Reverend Rod Thomas
- Bishop of Maidstone (PEV)
- Church: Church of England
- Diocese: Diocese of Canterbury
- In office: 2015–2022
- Successor: Rob Munro (as Bishop of Ebbsfleet)
- Other posts: Vicar of Elburton, Diocese of Exeter (1999–2015)

Orders
- Ordination: 1993 (deacon); 1994 (priest)
- Consecration: 23 September 2015 by Justin Welby

Personal details
- Born: Roderick Charles Howell Thomas; 7 August 1954 (age 72)
- Denomination: Anglicanism
- Spouse: Lesley
- Children: 3
- Education: London School of Economics; Wycliffe Hall, Oxford

Roderick Charles Howell Thomas (born 7 August 1954) is a retired Church of England bishop. He was the Bishop of Maidstone, a provincial episcopal visitor for conservative evangelical members and parishes of the church, from 2015 until his retirement in 2022.

== Early life ==
Thomas was born on 7 August 1954 in London, England. He was educated in Ealing, West London. He studied economics at the London School of Economics, and graduated in 1975 with a Bachelor of Science (BSc) degree.

Having completed his degree, Thomas joined the Civil Service. He left the Civil Service to become a researcher for the Institute of Directors. He ended his business career as Director of Employment and Environmental Affairs at the Confederation of British Industry, before leaving in 1991 to train for ordained ministry.

His early years were spent as a member of the Exclusive Plymouth Brethren. At the age of 12, under the influence of Billy Graham, John Stott and Maurice Wood, and having attended Emmanuel Church, Wimbledon, he became an Anglican. In 1991, he entered Wycliffe Hall, Oxford, a Church of England theological college, to train for ordained ministry.

== Ordained ministry ==
Having completed his training, Thomas was ordained in the Church of England as a deacon in 1993 and as a priest in 1994. He served his curacy at St Andrew's Church, Plymouth. He remained at St Andrew's Church as a curate from 1995 to 1999. From 1999 to 2005, he was priest-in-charge of St Matthew's Church, Elburton. From 2005 to 2015, he was vicar of Elburton. In 2012, he was additionally appointed a Prebendary of Exeter Cathedral.

Outside his parish ministry, Thomas held a number of appointments. He was a member of the General Synod of the Church of England from 2000 to 2015. He has been a member of the Reform organisation for nearly two decades, and its chairman from 2007 to 2015: Reform is a conservative evangelical Anglican organisation that opposes the ordination of women to the priesthood and promotes conservative attitudes to homosexuality. Up to 2015, he was a member of the executive committee of the Anglican Mission in England (AMiE), a missionary society set up by the Fellowship of Confessing Anglicans operating outside the Church of England.

=== Episcopal ministry ===
On 5 May 2015, Thomas was announced as the next Bishop of Maidstone, a provincial episcopal visitor for conservative evangelical members and parishes of the church. On 23 September 2015, he was consecrated a bishop at Canterbury Cathedral by Justin Welby, the Archbishop of Canterbury.

By 19 December 2016, 71 parishes had passed resolutions for conservative evangelical reasons, of which 31 had requested Alternative Episcopal Oversight (AEO) from the Bishop of Maidstone. By January 2018 there were 114 parishes with 53 receiving AEO, and by January 2019 there were 133 parishes with 63 receiving AEO.

Thomas is additionally an honorary assistant bishop in the dioceses of Birmingham, Bristol, Canterbury, Chelmsford, Chester, Ely, Exeter, Lichfield, London, Manchester, Norwich, Oxford, Rochester, Sheffield and Southwark. Thomas additionally is recorded as exercising AEO in the dioceses of Carlisle, Derby and Portsmouth, but is not listed by Crockford's as exercising AEO in those dioceses.

In January 2022, it was announced that Thomas would retire as Bishop of Maidstone on 2 October 2022.

In July 2024, he was commissioned by the Church of England Evangelical Council as an "overseer" to provided alternative spiritual oversight (not to be confused with the Church of England's official alternative episcopal oversight) to evangelical clergy and parishes in the Church of England who maintain traditional teaching on the doctrine of marriage and sexual ethics, following the General Synod's support for the introduction of a service of blessing for same sex couples.

== Views ==
Thomas has been described as a complementarian evangelical and as a conservative evangelical. He has expressed his support for the Nashville Statement, describing it as a "wonderfully clear statement about God's design for His creation insofar as it relates to marriage, sexual relationships and gender identity".

In 2006, it was announced that Jeffrey John (Dean of St Albans) had entered into a civil partnership with his male partner. Thomas replied to this news: "It is something that will only serve to deepen the crisis that the Church of England faces over the whole issue of human sexuality." He stated in December 2016: "I continue to believe that God's Word is clear that sexual intimacy should be experienced only within heterosexual marriage and not otherwise".

== Personal life ==
In 1981, Thomas married Lesley Easton. They have three children: two sons and one daughter.

Church of England titles
Preceded by Graham Cray as Bishop of Maidstone	Bishop of Maidstone; 2015–2022	Succeeded by Rob Munro as PEV for complementarian parishes
