= Listed buildings in Hartford, Cheshire =

Hartford is a civil parish in Cheshire West and Chester, England. It contains 14 buildings that are recorded in the National Heritage List for England as designated listed buildings. The parish is almost entirely residential and rural. The West Coast Main Line and the Chester to Manchester railway lines run through it, as do the River Weaver and the Weaver Navigation, and the A556 and the A559 roads. The listed buildings include houses and associated structures, a farmhouse and farm buildings, a hotel, a railway viaduct and a tunnel under a railway, a milepost, a church, and a war memorial.

== Key ==
Grade	Criteria
Grade II*	Particularly important buildings of more than special interest.
Grade II	Buildings of national importance and special interest.

== Listed buildings ==
Name and location	Photograph	Date	Notes	Grade
Hartford Hall Hotel; 53.2409°N 2.5368°W		Late 16th–early 17th century	This originated as a hall with a cross wing, and has developed by extensions in the 19th century into two parallel ranges. The older part is constructed in timber framing that has been stuccoed, and the later parts are in brick. The building has a slate roof. It is in two storeys, and has a five-bay front, with a projecting two-storey gables porch. The windows are casements.	II
Barn, Brown Heath Farm; 53.2478°N 2.5583°W	—	17th century	A timber-framed building on a brick plinth with a roof that is partly slated and partly covered in sheeting. It has a rectangular plan, and is in two storeys with a three-bay north front. The internal partitions are timber-framed.	II
The Hollies; 53.2427°N 2.5378°W		Early 18th century	A house remodelled and extended in about 1840, it is constructed in brick with slate roofs. It has an L-shaped, plan, is in two storeys, and has a four-bay west front. Three of the bays have a cast iron verandah. The windows are casements.	II
The Riddings; 53.2407°N 2.5437°W	—	18th century	Originally a house, it was remodelled in the mid-19th century, and has since been converted into flats. It is constructed in stuccoed brick, and has a hipped slate roof. It is a symmetrical two-storey building, and has a three-bay north front. There is an Ionic porch, and the windows are sashes.	II
Hartford Beach; 53.2496°N 2.5411°W	—	1802	The house was remodelled between 1814 and 1824 for Thomas Marshall, and has since been divided into two houses. It is constructed in stuccoed brick, and has a hipped slate roof. The house is in Neoclassical style with Gothic details.	II*
Hodge Lane Farmhouse; 53.2474°N 2.5680°W	—	Early 19th century	Extended later in the 19th century, the farmhouse is constructed in brick with slate roofs. It is in two storeys, and has a three-bay front. The windows are a mixture of casements and sashes.	II
Milepost; 53.23994°N 2.56267°W	—	Early to mid-19th century	A cast iron turnpike milepost with a domed cap carrying curved plates giving the distance in miles to Chester, Kelsall and Northwich.	II
Whitehall; 53.2430°N 2.5390°W		1835	This was built as a country house, designed by John Douglas, senior, and later used as council offices. It is constructed in stuccoed brick, and had a hipped slated roof. The building is in an L-plan, with two storeys, and has a seven-bay entrance front. This has an Ionic porch approached by three steps. The other (garden) front has a central canted bay.	II
Front wall and steps, Whitehall; 53.24298°N 2.53914°W		1835	Designed by John Douglas, senior, these are constructed in sandstone. It consists of a symmetrical wall with piers at the ends, and a central gateway with piers, which is approached by five steps.	II
Vale Royal Railway Viaduct; 53.2316°N 2.5372°W		1837	Built by Joseph Locke and George Stephenson for the Grand Junction Railway crossing the Weaver Navigation. It is constructed in sandstone and consists of five equal arches. Between the arches are pilasters, and a modillion cornice runs along the whole structure. Pylons for electrification were added in the 1960s.	II
Cattle tunnel 53.2335°N 2.5398°W	—	1837	Built by Joseph Locke and George Stephenson for Lord Delamere to allow the passage of cattle through the railway embankment. It consists of a barrel vaulted tunnel 40 metres (44 yd) long, with a semicircular arch carrying a keystone at each end bearing the Delamere arms.	II
Barn, Hodge Lane Farm; 53.2474°N 2.5683°W	—	Mid-19th century	The barn is constructed in brick with a slate roof. It has a rectangular plan, and is in two storeys with a six-bay east front. Each bay contains a stable door, a fixed window, and a circular pitch hole.	II
St John's Church; 53.2458°N 2.5441°W		1873–75	The church was designed by John Douglas, and the tower, also designed by Douglas, was built in 1885–87. Porches and a western extension were added in 1997–78. The church is constructed in buff sandstone with dressings in red sandstone, and tiled roofs.	II
War memorial 53.24562°N 2.54478°W		1921	The war memorial stands in the centre of a path in the churchyard of St John's Church. It is in stone, and consists of a decorated lantern cross surmounted by a Latin cross, on a grooved octagonal shaft. The shaft stands on an octagonal plinth on a base of three steps. On the front of the plinth is a carved inscription and on the other faces are the names of those lost in the first World War. The steps carry another inscription and the names of those lost in the Second World War.	II

== See also ==
- Listed buildings in Cuddington
- Listed buildings in Davenham
- Listed buildings in Northwich
- Listed buildings in Weaverham
- Listed buildings in Whitegate and Marton
