= Michael Houghton (bishop) =

Michael Alan Houghton (1949 – December 1999) was a British Anglican bishop who served as Bishop of Ebbsfleet from 1998 to 1999.

Houghton was born on 14 June 1949. He was educated at King Edward's School, Birmingham, the University of Lancaster and subsequently Durham University (1970–71), where he undertook a PGCE. He worked for British Rail and as a teacher before deciding to study for the priesthood at Chichester Theological College.

He was a curate at All Hallows, Wellingborough and from 1984 to 1990 served abroad in the "tiny missionary diocese" of Jamestown, Saint Helena. After returning to England he became the vicar of St Peter's, Folkestone and a tutor of the College of the Ascension in Selly Oak. He was appointed the second Bishop of Ebbsfleet in 1998.

He died in office following a heart attack aboard a train on 18 December 1999.

Church of England titles
Preceded by John Richards	Bishop of Ebbsfleet; 1998 –1999	Succeeded by Andrew Burnham
