= Hartford, Cheshire =

Village in Cheshire, England

Coordinates: 53.2450°N 2.5490°W

Hartford
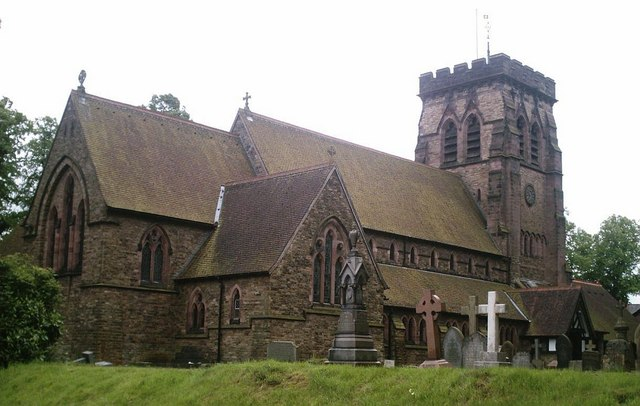
- St. John the Baptist Church, Hartford

- Location within Cheshire
- Population: 5,515 (2001)
- OS grid reference: SJ635715
- Civil parish: Hartford
- Unitary authority: Cheshire West and Chester
- Ceremonial county: Cheshire
- Region: North West
- Country: England
- Sovereign state: United Kingdom
- Post town: NORTHWICH
- Postcode district: CW8
- Dialling code: 01606
- Police: Cheshire
- Fire: Cheshire
- Ambulance: North West
- UK Parliament: Mid Cheshire

Hartford is a village and civil parish in the unitary authority of Cheshire West and Chester and the ceremonial county of Cheshire, England. It lies in the Cheshire Plain, to the south-west of the town of Northwich, at the intersection of the A559 road and the West Coast Main Line. It is surrounded by the parishes of Weaverham to the north, Kingsmead and Davenham to the east, Whitegate and Marton to the south and Cuddington to the west.

The village forms part of the Mid-Cheshire parliamentary constituency. In the 2011 Census, the population of the parish was 5,558.

== History ==
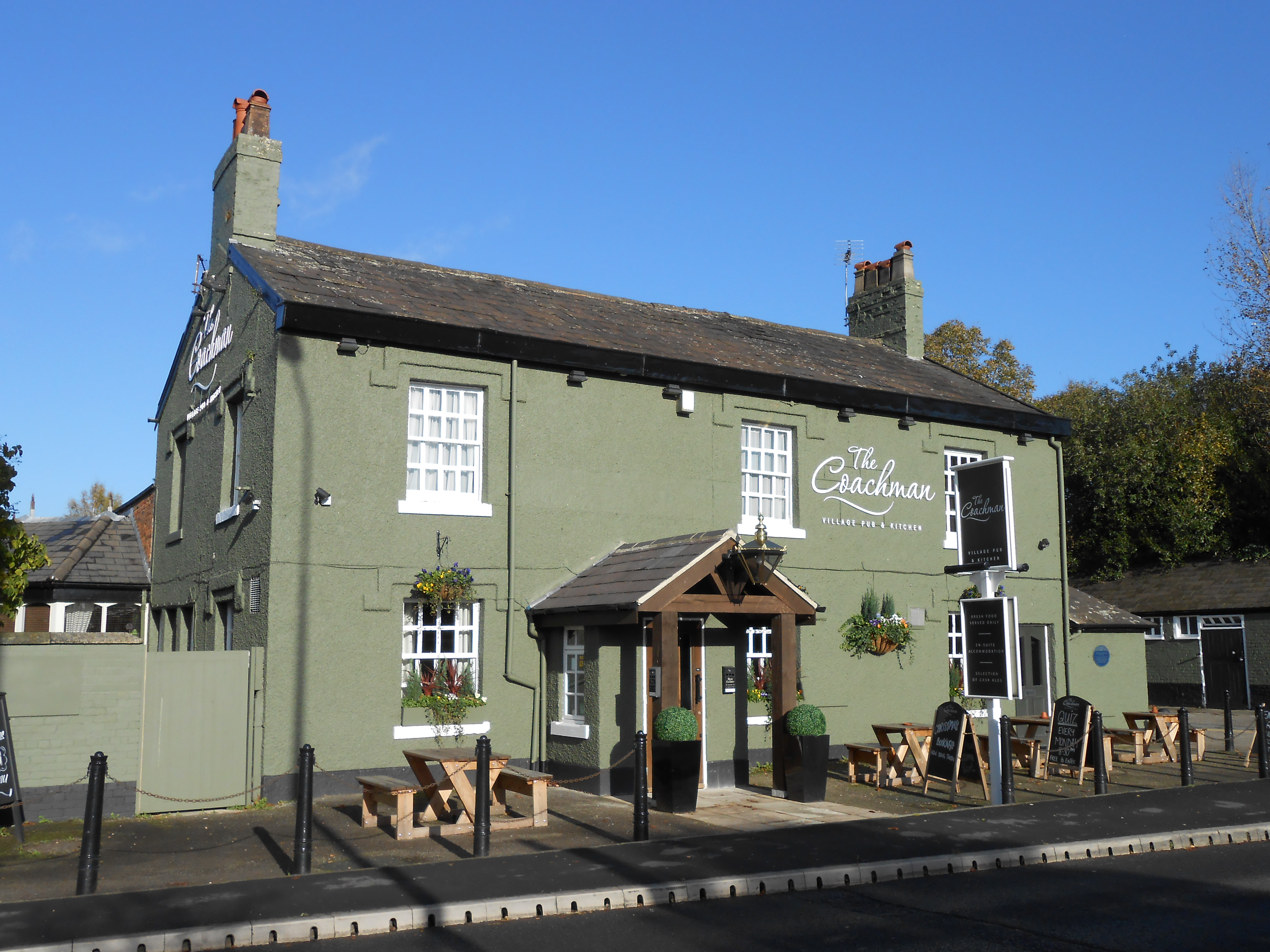
The Coachman Inn

Hartford was recorded in the Domesday Book of 1086, when the Manor was held by Gilbert de Venables as part of the Barony of Kinderton. Prior to the reign of Edward III, it was held by a family who assumed the local name, from which it passed to the Horton, Massey, Holcroft, Marbury and Davies families.

In 1644, during the English Civil War, a battle was fought at Hartford Green when Royalists from Chester encountered the Parliamentary forces from Northwich.

St John the Baptist Church was built in 1875, on the site of an earlier church that was consecrated in 1824. The original building was replaced because the village's population grew and the church became too small. The new building was designed by John Douglas.

Hartford was formerly a township divided between two ancient parishes; the greater part belonged to Witton chapelry of Great Budworth ancient parish, and a much smaller part in Weaverham cum Milton ancient parish. It also formed part of Eddisbury Hundred and was placed in Northwich poor law union in 1836. It was constituted a civil parish in 1866 and, in 1875, was added to the newly formed Northwich rural sanitary district.

Hartford railway station opened in 1837. A war memorial to those from the village who fought in World War I was erected in 1921 and stands in the centre of a path in the churchyard of St John's Church.

From 1894 to 1974, the whole of Hartford was part of Northwich rural district and it was served by Vale Royal borough council. In April 2009, the latter ceased to exist and Hartford is now a civil parish within the unitary authority of Cheshire West and Chester.

== Landmarks ==
Hartford has a number of listed buildings, including Hartford Hall Hotel, listed at Grade II, which dates from the 16th century, and Vale Royal Railway Viaduct, built in 1837 and also Grade II. Hartfordbeach (or Hartford Beach), on the northern edge of the village, has a Grade II* house, The Beeches.

St John the Baptist Church holds Evangelical services. Hartford also has a Methodist Church.

Hartford has a number of local shops across two shopping parades, including a coffee shop, hairdressers, dry cleaners, a florist, a cafe and a butcher. The village is also home to a number of pubs. It is home to Hartford Tennis Club, Hartford Cricket Club, a bowling club and a golf course with a driving range. A theatre owned by the independent school, The Grange, is located at their senior school off Bradburns Lane.

== Education ==
Hartford is an educational hub, with roughly the same number of students attending the numerous schools in the village as inhabitants.

It is home to several schools, including St. Nicholas Catholic High School, Hartford Church of England High School, Hartford Primary School (locally known as "Riddings Lane"), St. Wilfrid's Catholic Primary School and Hartford Manor Community Primary School. There are two schools which cater for children with learning disabilities called Cloughwood Academy and Greenbank. The private Grange School is also located in Hartford.

== Transport ==
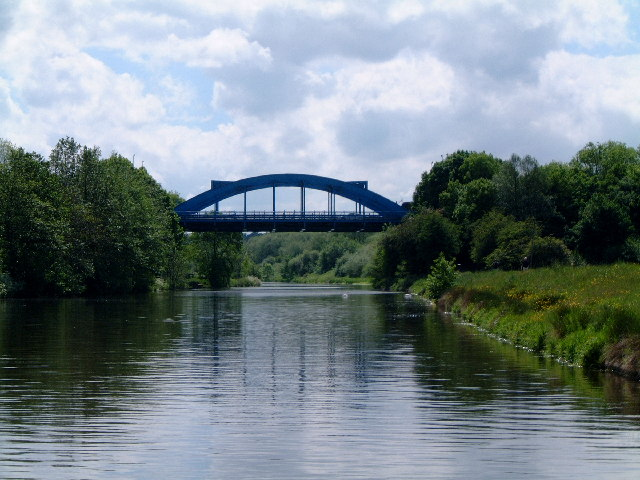
Hartford Bridge, where the A556 crosses the Weaver Navigation

Hartford is bisected by the A559, known as Chester Road. The A556 road bypasses the village as part of the Northwich bypass. The bridge that carries the road over the River Weaver is known as Hartford Bridge, or Blue Bridge, and was built in 1938.

The village is served by two railway stations:

- Hartford is a stop on the West Coast Main Line; London Northwestern Railway operates services between Liverpool Lime Street and Crewe and Avanti West Coast operates direct services from Hartford to London Euston
- Greenbank is on the Mid-Cheshire Line; Northern Trains operates services between Chester, Stockport and Manchester Piccadilly.

== Notable people ==
- Adolphus Rooke (1814–1881), settler in Van Diemen's Land, worked as a brewer and farmer, became a local politician
- Lal Hilditch (1894–1977), also known as Clarrie Hilditch, footballer who played 301 games for Manchester United F.C.
- Ronald Littledale (1902–1944), British Army officer, prisoner of war and escaped from Colditz Castle in WWII
- Ann Todd (1907–1993), a film, TV and stage actress
- Tim Lamb (born 1953), sports administrator and former cricketer, he played for Middlesex County Cricket Club

== See also ==
- Listed buildings in Hartford, Cheshire
- Hartford Manor
