= Paul Thomas (bishop) =

British Anglican bishop

The Right Reverend Paul Thomas SSC
- Bishop of Oswestry (PEV)
- Church: Church of England
- Diocese: Lichfield
- In office: 2023 to present
- Other post: Chairman of Forward in Faith (2023–present)
- Previous post: Vicar of St James's Church, Paddington (2011–2023)

Orders
- Ordination: 2002 (deacon); 2003 (priest)
- Consecration: 2 February 2023 by Martin Warner

Personal details
- Born: Paul Richard Thomas; 1975 (age 50–51)
- Denomination: Anglicanism
- Education: Cardiff University; Ripon College Cuddesdon

Paul Richard Thomas SSC (born 1975) is a British Anglican bishop who has served as Bishop of Oswestry, a suffragan bishop in the Diocese of Lichfield, and the provincial episcopal visitor for the western half of the Province of Canterbury (a position formerly held by the Bishop of Ebbsfleet) since February 2023. Previously, from 2011, he was vicar of St James's Church, Paddington.

== Early life and education ==
Thomas was born in 1975 and raised in Carmarthenshire, Wales. In 1992 while at high school, he was a contestant on the TV quiz show Blockbusters with a close win against Doctor Sema Mandal, a graduate of Gonville and Caius College. He studied medieval English at Cardiff University, graduating with a Bachelor of Arts (BA) degree in 1996. He continued his studies and graduated with a Master of Arts (MA) degree in 1998 or 1999. He trained for ordained ministry at Ripon College Cuddesdon, a theological college near Oxford. He graduated with a further BA in 2001 and an MA in 2006.

== Ordained ministry ==
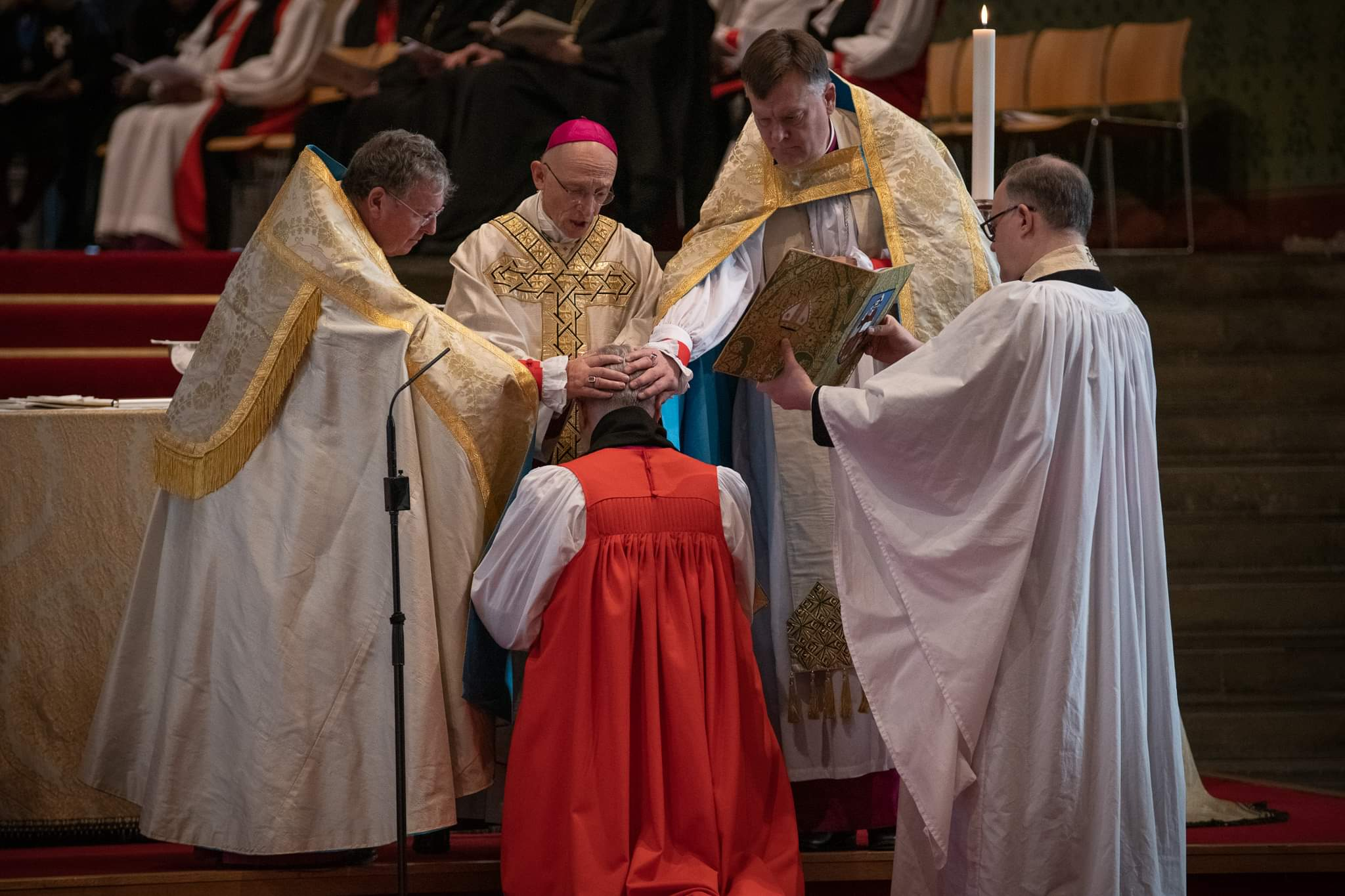
Thomas' consecration in 2023

Thomas was ordained in the Church of England as a deacon in 2002 and as a priest in 2003. From 2002 to 2006, he served his curacy in the parish of St Mary with Christ Church, Wanstead in the Diocese of Chelmsford. He was an assistant priest at St Marylebone Parish Church from 2006, and then additionally a chaplain at St Marylebone School and chaplain to the Royal Academy of Music from 2008.

In 2011, Thomas was appointed vicar of St James's Church, Paddington. Having stepped down as school chaplain when he left Marylebone, he continued as chaplain to the Royal Academy of Music until 2012. He was additionally area dean of Westminster Paddington from 2016 to 2021 and acting Archdeacon of Charing Cross from 2017 to 2019. He was also a school chaplain at Wellington College, Berkshire, from 2018 to 2019.

=== Episcopal ministry ===
On 2 December 2022, it was announced that Thomas would be the first Bishop of Oswestry, a suffragan bishop in the Diocese of Lichfield. The Bishop of Oswestry is also the provincial episcopal visitor for traditionalist Anglo-Catholic parishes (i.e. those which reject the ordination of women as priests and bishops) in the thirteen dioceses of the western half of the Province of Canterbury. This role had formerly been undertaken by the Bishop of Ebbsfleet, and as such Thomas is the first PEV Bishop of Oswestry. He was consecrated a bishop at Candlemas, 2 February 2023, by Martin Warner, Bishop of Chichester, at Canterbury Cathedral.

Thomas became chairman of Forward in Faith on Saint Andrew's Day, 30 November 2023.

On 31 March 2025, Thomas was made an honorary assistant bishop in the Diocese of Birmingham.

== Selected works ==
- Thomas, Paul (2012). Using the Book of Common Prayer: a simple guide. London: Church House. ISBN 9780715142769.
