= Hartford Church of England High School =

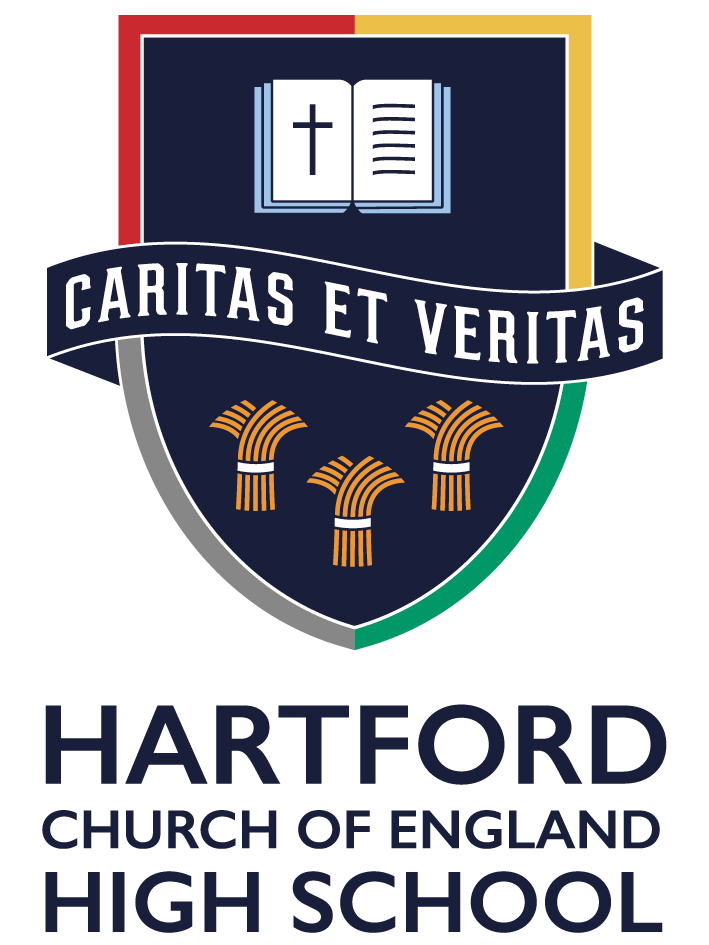

Location
- Neot Road; Hartford, Cheshire, CW8 1LH; England
- 53.2490°N 2.5367°W

Information
- Former name: Hartford High School
- Type: Voluntary aided school
- Motto: "Caritas et veritas"
- Religious affiliation: Church of England
- Established: 1978
- Founder: Merged
- Local authority: Cheshire West and Chester
- Department for Education URN: 138148 Tables
- Ofsted: Reports
- Chair Governor: Maurice McBride
- Head teacher: Rachel Pickerill
- Gender: Coeducational
- Age: 11 to 16
- Enrolment: 1076
- Houses: Riddings; Beeches; Whitehall; Hollies
- Colour: Navy blue
- Publication: Newsletter
- Website: www.hartfordchurchofenglandhighschool.co.uk

Hartford Church of England High School is a voluntary aided Church of England secondary school on Neot Road in Hartford, Cheshire. It has been rated as 'Good' by Ofsted.

== Description ==
Situated in Hartford, Cheshire, Hartford Church of England High School educates students from the local villages of Barnton, Greenbank, Castle, Winnington, Weaverham, Cuddington and the local town, Northwich. The school caters for 1,050 students from the age of eleven through sixteen. The school was formerly a split-site school, with an East site and a West site, though after the demolition of the main East site building the two main buildings exist entirely on the West site. In addition to the two main buildings, there is a Science & Administration Building on the East site and Music and Art Blocks on the West site.

On 20 and 21 June 2023, Ofsted inspected the school and concluded its overall effectiveness rating as 'Good', including such categories as 'quality of education', 'behaviour and attitudes', 'personal development' and 'leadership and management'.

== History ==
The school was founded in 1978 with the merger of two single-sex schools under the name 'Hartford High School'. The school became a voluntary aided Church of England secondary school at the end of the 2012 academic year. In this process, the school motto was changed to "Caritas et veritas" (love and truth), and the logo had a representation of a cross added to it.

Until the end of the 2019 academic year, the school was a split-site school, with the two main buildings being the 'West Building' and the 'East Building'. Located approximately 200 metres apart, the two buildings were linked by a secure path for students, separate from public realm areas. The 'East Building' has been replaced with a £7m new building on the West site. Upon demolishing the 'East Building', the school is now in one place except for the small Science & Administration Building on the East side.
