= All Souls Church, Langham Place =

Coordinates: 51.5180°N 0.1432°W

All Souls Church
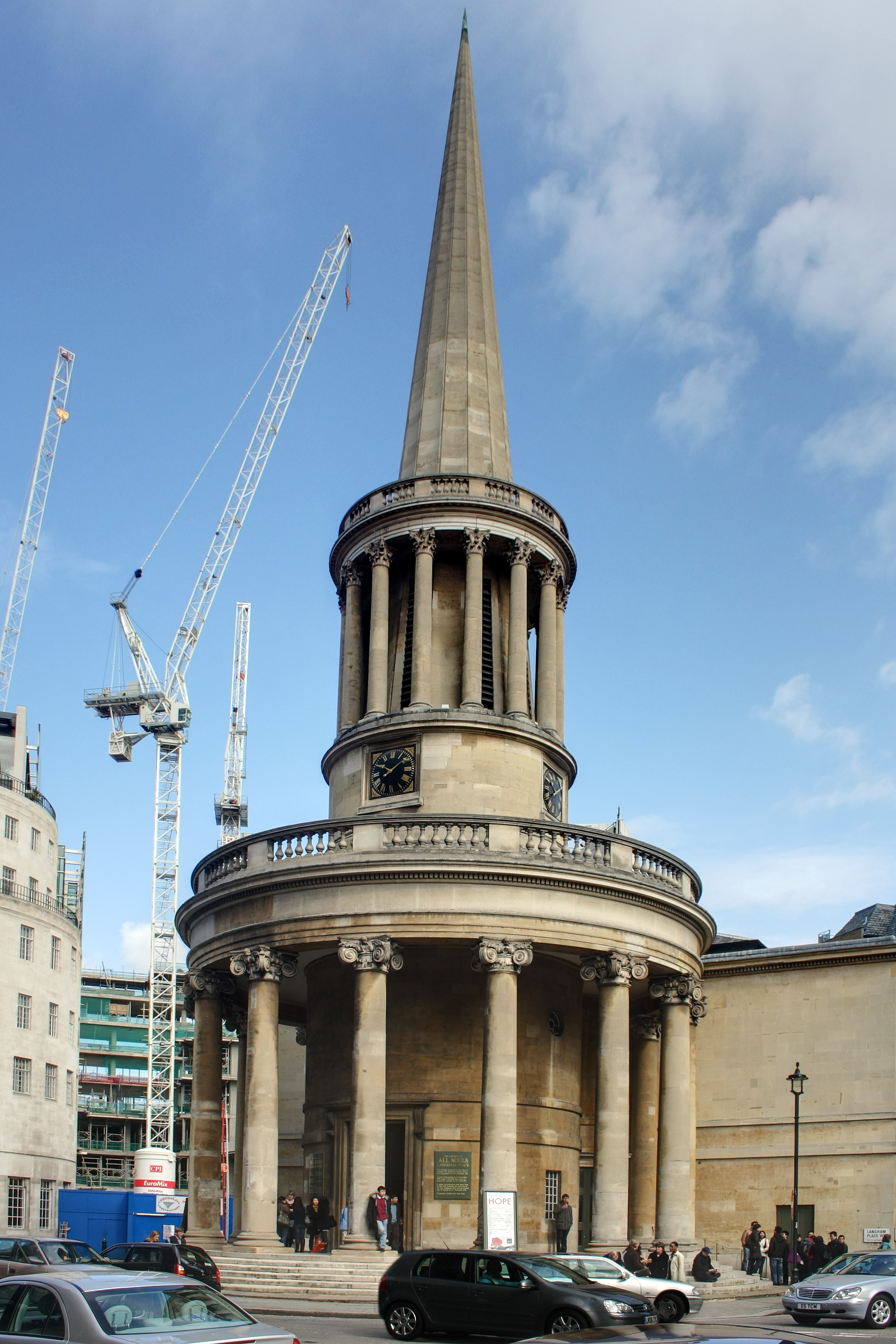
- All Souls Church in 2009
- All Souls Church
- OS grid reference: TQ 2893 8154
- Location: Regent Street, Marylebone, Greater London
- Country: England
- Denomination: Church of England
- Churchmanship: Conservative evangelical
- Website: allsouls.org

History
- Consecrated: 1824

Architecture
- Heritage designation: Grade I
- Architect: John Nash
- Style: Neoclassical, Regency

Administration
- Diocese: Diocese of London

Clergy
- Bishop: Rob Munro (AEO)
- Rector: Charlie Skrine

All Souls Church is a conservative evangelical Anglican church in the City of Westminster, situated in Langham Place in Marylebone, at the north end of Regent Street. It was designed in Regency style by John Nash and consecrated in 1824.

As the church stands directly opposite Broadcasting House, the BBC often uses the church. As well as the core church membership, many hundreds of visitors come to All Souls, bringing the average number of those coming through its doors for services on Sundays to around 2,500 every week.

== History ==
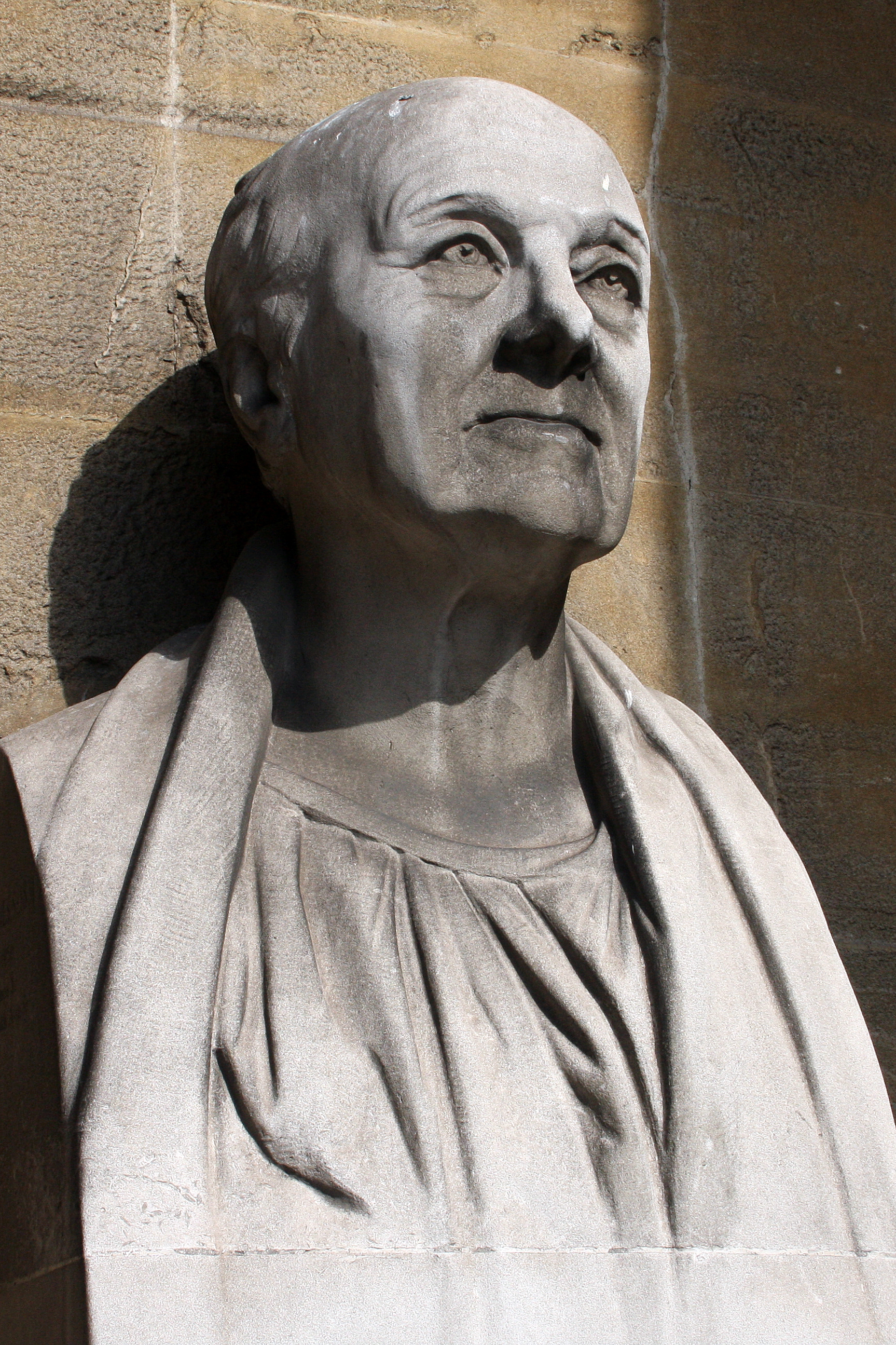
Bust of the architect John Nash outside the church

The church was designed by John Nash, favourite architect of King George IV. Its prominent circular-spired vestibule was designed as an eye-catching monument at the point where Regent Street, newly-laid out as part of Nash's scheme to link Piccadilly with the new Regent's Park, takes an awkward abrupt bend westward to align with the pre-existing Portland Place.

All Souls was a Commissioners' church, a grant of £12,819 (equivalent to £1,220,000 in 2025) being given by the Church Building Commission towards the cost of its construction. The commission had been set up under Church Building Act 1818 (58 Geo. 3. c. 45), and Nash, as one of the three architects employed by the Board of Works, had been asked to supply specimen designs as soon as the act was passed. It was, however, one of only two Commissioners' churches to be built to his designs, the other being the Gothic Revival St Mary, Haggerston. All Souls is the last surviving church by John Nash.

The building was completed in December 1823 at a final cost of £18,323 10s 5d. It was consecrated "with solemn grandeur" on 25 November 1824 by William Howley, Bishop of London, later Archbishop of Canterbury.

== Architecture ==
The church is built of Bath stone. It consists of a prominent spired circular vestibule, attached to a much more reticent main church by the width of a single intercolumniation. The idiosyncratic spire is composed of seventeen concave sides encircled by a peripteros of Corinthian columns, making two separate sections.

Nash's design was not met with universal praise. A reviewer for The Mirror of Literature, Amusement, and Instruction 2 August 1828, wrote:

To our eye, the church itself, apart from the tower, (for such it almost is) is perhaps, one of the most miserable structures in the metropolis,—in its starved proportions more resembling a manufactory, or warehouse, than the impressive character of a church exterior; an effect to which the Londoner is not an entire stranger. Here, too, we are inclined to ascribe much of the ridicule, which the whole church has received, to its puny proportions and scantiness of decoration, which are far from being assisted by any stupendousness in their details, the first impression of which might probably have fixed the attention of the spectator. Indeed, the whole style of the tower and steeple appears peculiarly illadapted for so small a scale as has here been attempted.

== Crown appointment ==
The Rector of All Souls Church is still appointed by the Crown Appointments Commission at 10 Downing Street. The links with the Crown date back to the time of George IV when the Crown acquired the land around the church. The Coat of Arms adorns the West Gallery.

== Post-war restoration ==
On 8 December 1940, a Luftwaffe parachute mine exploded during the Blitz, and caused some damage to the church, damaging the ceiling. Photographs of the wartime damage showed that most of the building survived, including most of the furnishings. The church was closed for some ten years while repair works were carried out. During this time, the congregation met for worship at St Peter's, Vere Street. The building was restored and furnishings replaced by the architect Harry Stuart Goodhart-Rendel, who was responsible for many church interiors, and was also responsible for the restoration and new fittings in 1923–1927. Although many furnishings survived the bombing, such as the pulpit, these, along with the rest of Goodhart-Rendel's work was disposed of in a later renovation campaign.

== Mid-1970s building project ==
Despite only having recently been fully restored in 1951, the church was again extensively renovated and modified in 1975–1976, in an unusually invasive scheme for a Grade I listed building, under the supervision of then rector, Michael Baughen. A large basement was excavated under the church to provide a church hall and other spaces for the congregation and visitors to meet together after services and during the week. The rebuilt floor was also raised to facilitate this, resulting in the original proportions of the room being significantly changed, resulting in the current squat appearance, with very low ceilings under the galleries, and unusually low windowsills. The gallery fronts were also replaced and date from this time, and the west gallery was also extended forward, now looking rather unusually unsupported for a classical building. The then-new Waldegrave Hall was built in the typical style of the 1970s, with wall-to-wall carpeting and fluorescent lighting. It is also designed in such a way that the original brick foundations of the church are visible.

At the same time, the opportunity was taken to restructure the interior of the church to make it more suitable for then-present-day forms of worship favoured by the more evangelical wing of the Church of England in the 1970s, and no original furnishing remains apart from the organ case and the reredos. The side altar in the south aisle was also removed, and the area is now used for chair storage. At present, the body of the church is carpeted, and stackable chairs and tables are provided to enable alternative uses of the space.

== Organ and music ==
All Souls is well known for its musical tradition and part of this includes the Hunter organ installed in the west gallery in a Spanish mahogany case designed by Nash. The case was enlarged and extended in 1913. In 1940, anticipating war damage to the church, the organ was dismantled and put into storage, then in 1951 remodelled and rebuilt, with a new rotatable electric manual and pedal console, and installed in the chancel by the firm of Henry Willis (IV). The organ was again rebuilt, by Harrison & Harrison, during the building project of 1975–1976, when a four-manual console was added, plus a positive division and a pronounced fanfare-trumpet en-chamade. In 1933, John Ivimey was appointed as organist and Director of Music.

Musical worship mixes contemporary and traditional styles, featuring either the church's worship band, orchestra, singing group or choir at all the main regular Sunday services, under the leadership of Michael Andrews. In 1972, the All Souls Orchestra was founded by former director of music and Emeritus Conductor, Noël Tredinnick, and has accompanied Sir Cliff Richard, Stuart Townend and other notable Christian artists. The orchestra and a massed choir perform annually at the Royal Albert Hall for the All Souls "Prom Praise" concert, which also tours across the UK and internationally. "Prom Praise for Schools" is sometimes held alongside Prom Praise, providing children from across the Diocese of London the chance to sing with the All Souls Orchestra. In 2012, the All Souls Orchestra celebrated its 40th anniversary, alongside special guests including Graham Kendrick, Keith & Kristyn Getty, and Jonathan Veira.

== Present day ==
All Souls celebrates three services each Sunday, 9:30 am and 11:30 am and an evening service at 5:30 pm. There is also a midweek service on Wednesday during term time at 11:45am.

Sermons from Sunday services are uploaded for free streaming and download by the following Monday afternoon. The archive now contains over 3,000 sermons.

The church stands in the conservative evangelical tradition of the Church of England. As it rejects the ordination/leadership of women, it receives alternative episcopal oversight from the Bishop of Ebbsfleet (currently Rob Munro).

== Clergy ==
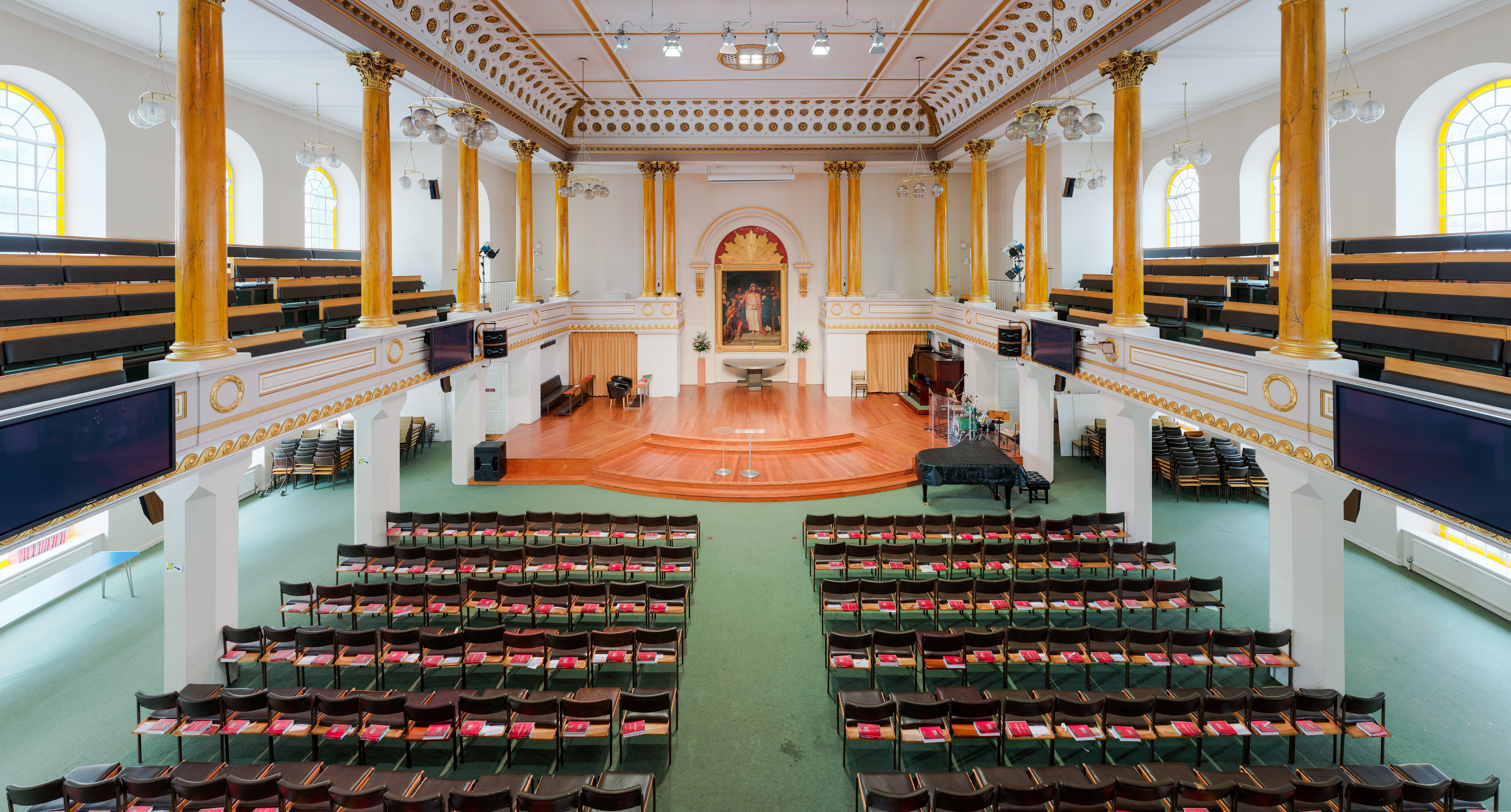
All Souls' Church interior as viewed from the balcony

The current rector is the Revd Charlie Skrine who was installed on 28 April 2021.

One of the church's most notable clerics was John Stott CBE, who was associated with All Souls for his entire ministry and virtually all his life. The author of more than fifty Christian books, Stott was regarded as an important theologian and leader of the evangelical movement during the 20th century. Stott was a curate at All Souls 1945–1950 and rector 1950–1975. He resigned as rector in 1975 to pursue his wider ministry, but maintained his involvement with the church and was given the title of Rector Emeritus, which he held until his death in 2011. Stott's obituary in Christianity Today described him as "An architect of 20th-century evangelicalism [who] shaped the faith of a generation."

The Revd Richard Bewes was rector from 1983 until his retirement in 2004. He was awarded an OBE for services to the Church of England. The Revd Hugh Palmer was rector from 2005 until his retirement in 2020. From July 2012 he was also a chaplain to the Queen.

Other notable former clergy include Rico Tice, who developed the Christianity Explored course; an introduction to Christian beliefs based on the Gospel of Mark and influenced by the conservative evangelical tradition.

== List of rectors ==
- George Chandler, Rector 1825–1847
- Charles Baring, Rector 1847–1855, later Bishop of Gloucester
- William Thomson, Rector 1855–1861, but in residence only in 1855; later Archbishop of York
- Edward Revell Eardley-Wilmot, Vicar 1855–1861, Rector 1861–1872
- John Minet Freshfield, Rector 1873–1878
- Sholto D. C. Douglas, Rector 1878–1886
- William Hay Chapman, Rector 1886–1893
- Johnston Hamilton Acheson, Rector 1893–1898
- Francis Scott Webster, Rector 1898–1920
- Arthur Buxton, Rector 1920–1936
- Harold Earnshaw Smith, Rector 1936–1950
- John Stott, Rector 1950–1975
- Michael Baughen, Rector 1975–1982, later Bishop of Chester
- Richard Bewes, Rector 1983–2004
- Hugh Palmer, Rector 2005–2020
- Charlie Skrine, Rector 2021–

== See also ==
- List of churches and cathedrals of London
- List of Commissioners' churches in London
