= The Society (Church of England) =

Independent association of Church of England clergy and lay people

The Society under the patronage of Saint Wilfrid and Saint Hilda
- Classification: Anglican
- Orientation: Principally Anglo-Catholic, with some Prayer Book Catholic parishes
- Polity: Episcopal
- Leader: Jonathan Baker (Bishop of Fulham, chair)
- Region: England
- Congregations: Over 400 active member parishes
- Official website: sswsh.com

The Society, more fully The Society under the patronage of Saint Wilfrid and Saint Hilda, is an independent association of Anglo-Catholic clergy and lay people in the Church of England which defines itself as "an ecclesial body, led by a Council of Bishops". It was formed for those who, for theological reasons, are unable to receive the ministry of women priests or bishops, or of male clergy who have been ordained by female bishops, to flourish and grow within the Church of England. The parishes of The Society enjoy a relationship of full communion with their bishop and with all the other parishes of The Society. It is supported by Forward in Faith and administered by its director.

The Society's stated purposes are:

- to promote and maintain catholic teaching and practice within the Church of England
- to provide episcopal oversight to which churches, institutions and individuals will freely submit themselves
- to guarantee a ministry in the historic apostolic succession in which they can have confidence

== History ==
Plans for creation of The Society were announced on 24 September 2010, by a group of bishops of the Church of England who did not ordain women to the priesthood. This was in preparation for the new situation that would arise following the ordination of women to the episcopate. Its council of bishops began to meet regularly in 2013. In 2014, its members appointed a bishop's representative for each diocese of the Church of England. Registration began in 2014 of male transitional or permanent deacons and female permanent deacons as "Deacons of The Society" and male priests as "Priests of The Society".

== Council of bishops ==
The Society's council of bishops are Church of England bishops. As of August 2025, the following bishops are on the council:

- The Rt Rev'd Jonathan Baker, Bishop of Fulham (Chairman)
- The Rt Rev'd Stephen Race SSC, Bishop of Beverley
- The Rt Rev'd Philip North CMP, Bishop of Blackburn
- The Rt Rev'd Martin Warner SSC, Bishop of Chichester
- The Rt Rev'd Will Hazlewood SSC, Bishop of Lewes
- The Rt Rev'd Paul Thomas SSC, Bishop of Oswestry
- The Rt Rev'd Luke Irvine-Capel SSC, Bishop of Richborough

== See also ==
- Category:Anglo-Catholic churches in England receiving AEO
- Saint Wilfrid
- Saint Hilda of Whitby
- List of Anglo-Catholic churches in England
