= St Nicholas Catholic High School =

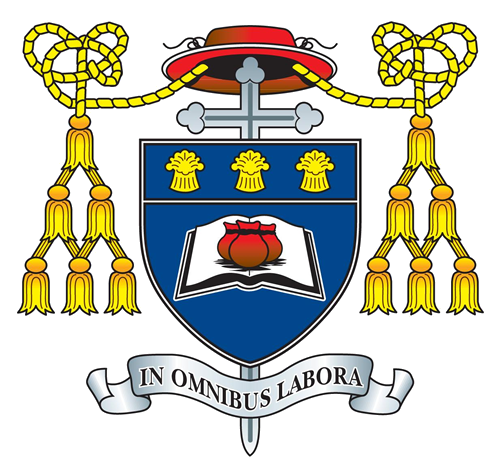

Location
- Greenbank Lane; Hartford, Cheshire, CW8 1JW; England; 53°14′56″N 2°31′43″W

Information
- Type: Voluntary aided high school
- Motto: In Omnibus Labora; (Labour in all things)
- Religious affiliations: Catholic; Diocese of Shrewsbury
- Established: 1965; 61 years ago
- Local authority: Cheshire West and Chester
- Department for Education URN: 111450 Tables
- Ofsted: Reports
- Chair: Jonathan Reid
- Headteacher: Craig Burns
- Gender: Mixed
- Age: 11 to 18
- Enrolment: 1,288
- Colours: Teal; black; white; red; gold
- Website: st-nicholas.cheshire.sch.uk

St Nicholas Catholic High School is a mixed voluntary aided school and sixth form in Hartford, near Northwich, Cheshire for students aged 11 to 18. The headteacher is Craig Burns. The students who enroll there study for 5 years and after GCSEs, they have the possibility of going to the associated Sixth Form.

== History ==
St Nicholas Catholic High School opened as a secondary modern on 6 September 1965, with Michael O'Connor as its first head teacher and Father R. Velarde, Parish Priest of St. Wilfrid's, Northwich as the first Chairman of Governors. It was the first Catholic secondary school in mid-Cheshire.

In 1972, the school became a comprehensive, and changed its name to St Nicholas High School. At the same time, a new science and languages block was built to the side of the original building. In 1979, a new sixth form block was opened by Mark Carlisle, the Secretary of State for Education. Remodelled science laboratories followed in 1989, and a music suite and additional science laboratories in 1992.

In 1995, O'Connor retired after 30 years as headmaster, and was succeeded by Gerard Boyle. In 2003, the school was awarded Business and Enterprise status. The school also holds the Eco-Schools Green Flag, Healthy Schools status and the Inclusion Quality Mark.

St Nicholas has extended and refurbished the originally standing Sports Hall with Science and Language rooms at the rear at a total cost of £11.5m, as well as a refurbished Sixth Form Centre and new Geography rooms.

Following the retirement of Gerard Boyle at the end of the 2009 term, his successor was Kieran Kelly.

When Kieran Kelly retired at Christmas 2016, the Deputy Headteacher Angela Norman took over as Acting Headteacher until Richard Woods took up post as Headteacher at Easter 2017.

Woods remained Headteacher until Christmas 2022 when he left to become deputy director of Schools for the Shrewsbury Diocese. John Heffernan, the Deputy Headteacher served one term as Acting Headteacher before Craig Burns took up post at Easter 2023.

== Ofsted ==
In its 2004 Ofsted inspection, the school and sixth form was rated "very good". In the July 2011 inspection, it was rated "outstanding". The school was reassessed in 2019 and downgraded to "good" due, in part, to the performance of disadvantaged students. The school was reassessed again in 2024, where it was graded "good".

== Catchment area ==
As there are few Catholic high schools in Cheshire, St Nicholas' catchment area extends as far away as Helsby and Knutsford. It also includes Barnton, Davenham, Kingsmead, Middlewich, Weaverham and Winsford. The Sixth Form catchment area also includes the area of St. Thomas More Catholic High School in Crewe, which does not have its own sixth form. Buses run from all the mentioned towns and villages to and from St Nicholas, but due to recent cuts the bus service has come under threat.

== Residentials and retreats ==
Residentials and retreats are normally organised during the month of January. Year 7 pupils usually stay at Conwy Centre in Anglesey for three days. Usually, Year 7 pupils go on a retreat day to St Wilfrids RC Church. Year 10 pupils have attended retreats to Savio House in Bollington, Cheshire for a number of years, more recently some have attended retreats at Brettargh Holt in Cumbria and Middleton Grange in North Yorkshire.

== Notable former pupils ==
- Nicky Maynard – ex-footballer
- David Mannix – ex-footballer
