= Reform (Anglican) =

Reform was a conservative evangelical organisation within Evangelical Anglicanism, active in the Church of England and the Church of Ireland.

Several large Anglican churches in England were members of Reform, such as Jesmond Parish Church (in Newcastle upon Tyne), St Ebbe's, Oxford and St Helen's Bishopsgate (located in the City of London).

In May 2018, Reform merged with the Church Society.

== History ==
Reform was started in 1993 to oppose the ordination of women to the priesthood (like Forward in Faith in the Anglo-Catholic tradition) but has recently focused on advocating a conservative view of homosexuality. Reform has also been involved in encouraging people to be involved in the structures of the Church of England and to celebrate what is good about what the Church of England officially believes. Reform is keen to recognise the unique value of women's ministry within the church. Some Reform members support ordination of women to the priesthood, but not their appointment in charge of a parish or similar. Reform members are also divided over the issue of the remarriage of divorced persons and the issue is left out of the definition of marriage found in the Reform Covenant.

Reform stand firmly in the more Reformed tradition of the Church of England, but while they disagree of the interpretation placed upon Anglicanism by Forward in Faith (e.g. views about the Eucharist, the meaning of ordination, prayers for the dead and to the saints) they pledged at their 2006 conference their co-operation with that Anglo-Catholic grouping to oppose the acceptance of women as bishops within the Church of England.

On 19 February 2018 it was announced that Reform, along with another body, the Fellowship of Word and Spirit, was to merge into the organisation Church Society. In May 2018, Reform and the Fellowship of Word and Spirit merged with the Church Society to provide a united voice for conservative evangelicals within the Church of England.

== Leadership ==
From 2007 to 2015, Rod Thomas has been chairman of Reform. In 2015, it was announced that he was to be the first dedicated conservative evangelical bishop, as the new Bishop of Maidstone: he took up the appointment upon his consecration as a bishop in September 2015.

Thomas's successor as chairman of Reform was Mark Burkill, the Vicar of Christ Church, Leyton.

== List of associated churches ==
- Christ Church, Westbourne
- Holy Trinity, Eastbourne
- St Peter's, Tunbridge Wells
- St Mary's Eastrop, Basingstoke
- Sherbornes with Pamber Parish Church
- Christ Church, Surbiton
- Emmanuel Wimbledon
- St Nicholas, Tooting
- Christ Church, Peckham
- Christ Church, Mayfair
- All Souls, Langham Place
- Christ Church, Leyton
- Holy Trinity, Lyonsdown
- St George's, Dagenham
- Dagenham Parish Church
- St Helen's Bishopsgate, London
- Dundonald Church, Wimbledon
- St Peter's, Harold Wood
- All Saints, Wandsworth
- St John's, Great Clacton
- All Saints, Little Shelford
- St Andrew the Great, Cambridge
- All Saints, Riseley
- Christ Church, Matchborough
- Christ Church, Wyre Forest
- Jesmond Parish Church, Newcastle
- St Ebbe's Church, Oxford
