= Graham Cray =

British Anglican bishop

The Right Reverend Graham Cray
- Archbishops' Missioner and Team Leader of Fresh Expressions
- Church: Church of England
- In office: 2009–2014
- Other posts: Bishop of Maidstone (2001–2009); Principal, Ridley Hall (1992–2001)

Orders
- Ordination: 1971 (deacon); 1972 (priest)
- Consecration: March 2001 by George Carey

Personal details
- Born: 21 April 1947 (age 79)
- Denomination: Anglican
- Parents: Alan & Doris
- Spouse: Jacqueline Webster (m. 1973)
- Children: Two daughters
- Education: University of Leeds; St John's College, Nottingham

Graham Alan Cray (born 21 April 1947) is a retired British Anglican bishop. He was the Bishop of Maidstone in the Diocese of Canterbury from 2001 to 2009, and was the Archbishops' Missioner and Team Leader of Fresh Expressions from 2009 to 2014.

== Early life and education ==
Cray grew up without his mother Doris, who killed herself when he was 8 years old. Cray was educated (gaining a Bachelor of Arts), at Leeds University and St John's College, Nottingham.

== Ordained ministry ==
He began his ministry as a curate at St Mark's Church, Gillingham. Cray later spent 14 years at St Michael-le-Belfrey in York (at first working with, and later succeeding, David Watson) before becoming Principal of Ridley Hall theological college in Cambridge.

Cray was consecrated a bishop in March 2001. He served as the Bishop of Maidstone, a suffragan bishop in the Diocese of Canterbury, between 2001 and 2009. In 2009, he was appointed to lead the Archbishops' (of Canterbury and of York) Fresh Expressions team. He retired from full-time ministry in 2014.

He is the Chairman of Soul Survivor. In 2024 Cray was subject to disciplinary action for failing to pass on information regarding allegations against Mike Pilavachi.
