= Hartford Bridge, Cheshire =

Hartford Bridge
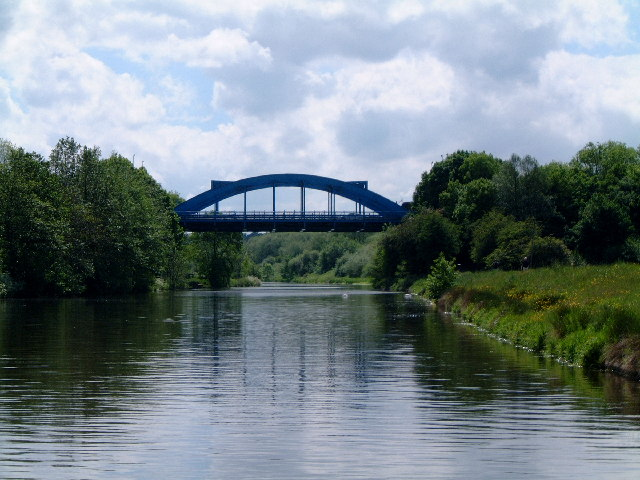
- Hartford Bridge
- Coordinates: 53°14′15.8″N 2°31′48.2″W
- Carries: A556
- Crosses: River Weaver
- Locale: Hartford, Cheshire

History
- Opened: 1938

Statistics
- Toll: None

Location
- Interactive map of Hartford Bridge

The Hartford Bridge, or Blue Bridge, is a single-span road bridge crossing the River Weaver at Hartford, Cheshire in England. The bridge is located on the A556 as part of the Northwich bypass.
