= Bishop of Oswestry =

Church of England flying bishop

The Bishop of Oswestry is a suffragan bishop of the Diocese of Lichfield who fulfils the role of a provincial episcopal visitor in the Church of England. Since 2023, Paul Thomas has been the Bishop of Oswestry.

== Background ==
Following the first ordinations of women in 1993 to the priesthood in the Church of England, Bishops suffragan of Ebbsfleet and of Richborough were appointed "provincial episcopal visitors" — known as "flying bishops" — to provide episcopal oversight for parishes throughout the province of Canterbury which reject the ministry of bishops who have participated in the ordination of women.

== Creation of bishopric ==
In June 2022, it was announced that, from January 2023, oversight of traditionalist Anglo-Catholics in the west of Canterbury province (formerly the Bishop of Ebbsfleet's area) would be taken by a new Bishop of Oswestry, suffragan to the Bishop of Lichfield; while oversight of conservative Evangelicals (formerly the duties of a Bishop suffragan of Maidstone) would be taken by the next Bishop of Ebbsfleet. The Bishop of Oswestry was to serve the western 13 dioceses of the southern province (Bath and Wells, Birmingham, Bristol, Coventry, Derby, Exeter, Gloucester, Hereford, Lichfield, Oxford, Salisbury, Truro, and Worcester). On 2 December 2022, Paul Thomas, Vicar of St James's Church, Paddington, was announced to be the first Bishop of Oswestry; he was consecrated in Canterbury Cathedral on 2 February 2023 (the Feast of Candlemas) by Martin Warner, Bishop of Chichester, on behalf of Justin Welby, Archbishop of Canterbury, who was present during the service.

== Controversy ==
The choice of Oswestry as the see's name was publicly criticised by Oswestry town councillor Jonathan Upton, who, in a letter to the Bishop of Lichfield, protested: "The response received to this announcement in Oswestry is one of upset and anger. The people of Oswestry feel deeply unhappy that our town's name is being used by the Anglican church as a tool of appeasing the opponents of gender equality and modern interpretation of the scripture." He reported St Oswald's Parish Church had declared it supported female clergy or clergy from the LGBT community working with it, and that, apart from St Oswald's and the other parish church in the town, ordained women were serving the remainder of the area's rural parishes as vicars.

== List of bishops ==
Bishops of Oswestry
From	Until	Incumbent	Notes
1889	2023	vacant	
2023	present	Paul Thomas	announced December 2022; consecrated 2 February 2023.

== See also ==
- Bishop of Beverley
- Bishop of Richborough
- List of Anglo-Catholic churches in England
