= Crosslinks =

- Bible Churchmen's Missionary Society
- Formation: 1922
- Type: Anglicanism; Conservative evangelicalism
- Legal status: Active
- Headquarters: London England
- Mission Director: John McLernon
- Website: crosslinks.org

Crosslinks is an evangelical Anglican missionary society, drawing its support mainly from parishes in the Church of England and Church of Ireland. It was known as the Bible Churchmen's Missionary Society (BCMS) until 1992. The BCMS was created as the result of a conservative split from the Church Missionary Society.

== Foundation ==
BCMS was founded on 27 October 1922 as a result of a split in the Church Missionary Society (CMS). A number of CMS missionaries and supporters had become unhappy at its drift towards theological liberalism. BCMS was intended as a continuation of CMS's original theological and missionary principles. The Society was quickly established under the forceful leadership of Daniel Bartlett, who dominated its first 25 years. Another significant early supporter was Dean Wace. While the parting was less than amicable, Bartlett ruled that all BCMS missionaries should transfer to areas where the CMS had not previously operated, in an attempt to restore charitable relations. Another priority was the establishment of a training college (1925) in line with BCMS's theology, which later became Trinity College, Bristol.

The ecclesiastical historian Adrian Hastings has argued that this is one of the few English parallels to the Fundamentalism controversy in the US. He notes that BCMS differed from CMS by "only one word" – Bible. However, it is noteworthy that in contrast to US examples, BCMS remained committed to the Church of England and the Church of Ireland, despite their theological diversity.

27 October anniversary has become part of Crosslinks' traditions, and is commemorated by enthusiasts as Crosslinks Day.

== History ==
The first BCMS missionary was 84-year-old Archdeacon A. W. Mackay of Saskatchewan, Canada. He worked among the Inuit of Canada. In 1923, work began in India, followed by China and Burma. In 1927, officials in Ethiopia invited BCMS to begin work there, but it was not until 1929 that BCMS's first missionaries to Africa arrived in Morocco. The same year saw a specific request to begin work in Kenya and Uganda.

The worldwide turmoil around the Second World War led to the Society's withdrawal from a number of countries: Ethiopia (1937 war), Burma (1942 invasion), and China (1949–51 expulsion). The late 1940s also saw Bartlett finally relinquish leadership to A. T. Houghton. The following decades saw an increasing focus on East Africa, particularly the Karamoja area of Uganda, and the Diocese of Karamoja retains a strong Crosslinks connection.

In the second half of the twentieth century, the tide of decolonisation led to the scaling down and rethinking of activities in Africa and India. BCMS/Crosslinks has participated in two trends common to most Western missionary societies:

- Missionaries are as likely to come from the Global South as to go there. Given the distribution of Anglicans, this has tended to mean African mission partners joining Crosslinks.
- The West is now seen as a mission field. Crosslinks brings African pastors to England and Ireland, it has an environmental protection programme in Western Europe (A Rocha) and starts new churches in urban England as it traditionally did in rural Africa.

The Crosslinks name emphasises the society's principle that Mission is from everywhere to everywhere. The name also helps to make possible work in some of the 60 or so countries where Bible, Church and Missionary are not acceptable.

== See also ==
- Church Mission Society
- History of Christian missions
