= Bishop of Ebbsfleet =

Church of England flying bishop

The Bishop of Ebbsfleet is a suffragan bishop who fulfils the role of a provincial episcopal visitor in the Church of England. From its creation in 1994 to 2022, the Bishop of Ebbsfleet served traditionalist Anglo-Catholic parishes that are unable to receive the ministry of women bishops or priests. Since 2023, the bishop has served conservative evangelical parishes that reject the ordination and/or leadership of women due to complementarian beliefs.

== Traditionalist catholic bishops ==
The see was erected under the Suffragans Nomination Act 1888 by Order in Council dated 8 February 1994 and licensed by the Archbishop of Canterbury as a "flying bishop" to provide episcopal oversight for parishes throughout the province which do not accept the sacramental ministry of bishops who have participated in the ordination of women. The position is named after Ebbsfleet in Thanet, Kent. In the southern province, the bishops of Ebbsfleet and of Richborough each ministered in 13 of the 40 dioceses; the Bishop of Ebbsfleet served the western 13 dioceses: Bath and Wells, Birmingham, Bristol, Coventry, Derby, Exeter, Gloucester, Hereford, Lichfield, Oxford, Salisbury, Truro and Worcester. Until the creation of the suffragan See of Richborough in 1995, the Bishop of Ebbsfleet served the entire area of the Province of Canterbury with the exceptions of the dioceses of London, Rochester and Southwark which came under the oversight of the Bishop of Fulham.

Jonathan Goodall was announced as the fifth Bishop of Ebbsfleet on 2 August 2013. His episcopal consecration took place on 25 September 2013 at Westminster Abbey. He had been the chaplain and ecumenical secretary to the Archbishop of Canterbury. He was the fourth of the five bishops to be affiliated with the Society of the Holy Cross. On 3 September 2021 he resigned his episcopacy in order to be received into the Roman Catholic Church.

== Conservative evangelical bishops ==
In June 2022, it was announced that, from January 2023, oversight of traditionalist Anglo-Catholics in the west of Canterbury province (formerly the Bishop of Ebbsfleet's area) would be taken by a new Bishop of Oswestry, suffragan to the Bishop of Lichfield. Oversight of conservative evangelicals would be taken by the next Bishop of Ebbsfleet; the See of Maidstone (the original conservative evangelical flying bishop) would be left vacant, available for other uses. As such, from 2023, the Bishop of Ebbsfleet will provide alternative episcopal oversight to parishes who have passed resolutions that reject the ordination and/or leadership of women due to complementarian beliefs. On 9 December 2022 the appointment was announced of Rob Munro as the next Bishop of Ebbsfleet and he was consecrated bishop on 2 February 2023.

== List of bishops ==
Bishops of Ebbsfleet (traditionalist Anglo-Catholics)
From	Until	Incumbent	Notes
29 April 1994	31 October 1998	John Richards	Retired; died November 2003
December 1998	18 December 1999	Michael Houghton SSC	Died in office
30 November 2000	31 December 2010	Andrew Burnham SSC	Resigned to become a Roman Catholic
16 June 2011	13 February 2013	Jonathan Baker SSC	Translated to Fulham
25 September 2013	8 September 2021	Jonathan Goodall SSC	Resigned to become a Roman Catholic
8 September 2021	2023	vacant	
Bishops of Ebbsfleet (conservative evangelicals)
2023	present	Rob Munro	

== See also ==
- Bishop of Beverley
- Bishop of Richborough
- List of Anglo-Catholic churches in England
