= Bishop of Maidstone =

Alternative conservative episcopal church oversight

The Bishop of Maidstone is an episcopal title used by a suffragan bishop of the Church of England Diocese of Canterbury, in the Province of Canterbury, England. The title takes its name from the county town of Maidstone in Kent. The see is currently vacant.

== Canterbury suffragan ==
Until 2009, the suffragan Bishop of Maidstone had a similar, though subordinate, role to that of the Bishop of Dover: to assist the diocesan bishop (the Archbishop of Canterbury) in the episcopal leadership of the Diocese of Canterbury. It was decided at the diocesan synod of November 2010 that a new bishop would not be appointed; rather the Archdeaconry of Ashford was erected.

== "Headship" bishop ==
On 4 December 2014, it was announced that the see of Maidstone would be filled again in order to provide alternative episcopal oversight for particular members of the Church of England who take a conservative evangelical view on male "headship". On 23 September 2015, Rod Thomas was consecrated Bishop of Maidstone.

In June 2022, it was announced that, from January 2023, oversight of conservative Anglo-Catholics in the west of the Province of Canterbury (formerly the Bishop of Ebbsfleet's area) would be taken by a new Bishop of Oswestry, suffragan to the Bishop of Lichfield; while oversight of conservative Evangelicals would be taken by the next Bishop of Ebbsfleet; the See of Maidstone would be left vacant, available for other uses.

== List of bishops ==
Bishops of Maidstone
From	Until	Incumbent	Notes
1944	1946	Leslie Owen	Translated to Lincoln
1946	1956	no appointment	
1956	1966	Stanley Betts	
1966	1969	no appointment	
1969	1976	Geoffrey Tiarks	
1976	1980	Richard Third	Translated to Dover
1980	1987	Robert Hardy	Translated to Lincoln
1987	1992	David Smith	Translated to Bradford
1992	2001	Gavin Reid	
2001	2009	Graham Cray	
2009	2015	vacant	
Bishops of Maidstone (AEO)
From	Until	Incumbent	Notes
2015	2022	Rod Thomas	Retired 2 October 2022.
