= Provincial episcopal visitor =

Church of England bishop

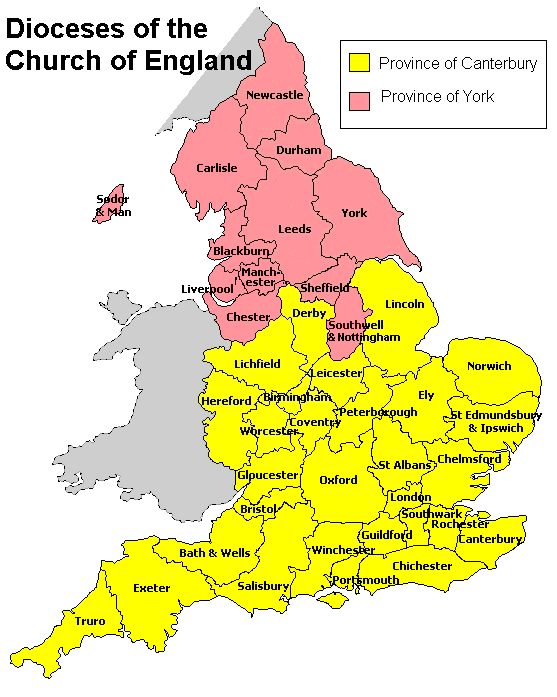
Dioceses of the Church of England

A provincial episcopal visitor (PEV), popularly known as a flying bishop, is a Church of England bishop assigned to minister to many of the clergy, laity and parishes who on grounds of theological conviction "are unable to receive the ministry of women bishops or priests" as well as the ministry of male bishops or priests at whose ordination a female bishop presided. The system by which bishops oversee these churches is referred to as alternative episcopal oversight (AEO).

== History ==
The Church of England ordained its first women priests in 1994. According to acts of the General Synod passed the previous year (Priests (Ordination of Women) Measure 1993), if a parish does not accept the ministry of women priests it can formally request that none be appointed to minister to it. Via the Episcopal Ministry Act of Synod 1993, if the local bishop has participated in the ordination of women as priests, a parish can request to be under the pastoral and sacramental care of another bishop who has not participated in such ordinations. In such a case the parish still remains in the diocese of the local diocesan bishop, at whose invitation the "flying bishop" makes his visitation.

The act empowered the metropolitans of the Church of England's two provinces to appoint provincial episcopal visitors as suffragan bishops whose main purpose is to be available for such visits to parishes across the province. Accordingly, four PEV bishops were appointed across the two provinces.

In December 2010, the then bishops of Richborough, Ebbsfleet and Fulham resigned from the Church of England to join the Personal Ordinariate of Our Lady of Walsingham in full communion with the Roman Catholic Church. On 5 May 2011, their successors as PEVs were announced. In September 2021 Jonathan Goodall, the bishop of Ebbsfleet, also resigned to join the Roman Catholic church.

In 2014, with the ordination of women to the episcopate, the previous Acts of Synod were replaced with the House of Bishop's Declaration on the Ministry of Bishops and Priests. The declaration enables continued pastoral and sacramental provision for traditional Anglo-Catholics and complementarian evangelicals within the Church of England.

In preparation for changes to the episcopacy The Society, of Saint Wilfrid and Saint Hilda, was formed by traditional catholic bishops within the Church of England. The Society is an ecclesial body, formed to uphold catholic teaching, led by a Council of Bishops within which bishops, priests and parishes of The Society are in full communion. The Society "guarantee[s] a ministry in the historic apostolic succession in which they can have confidence"; i.e. a ministry of male priests who are ordained by male bishops at whose episcopal consecration a male bishop in the historic apostolic succession presided. Since 2014, the consecration of traditional catholic Bishops has been delegated to three Bishops who share their theological conviction.

On 4 December 2014, it was announced that the See of Maidstone would be filled again in order to provide a further provincial episcopal visitor for particular conservative evangelical members of the Church of England who take a complementarian view on headship.

In June 2022, it was announced that, from January 2023, oversight of traditionalist Anglo-Catholics in the west of Canterbury province (formerly the Bishop of Ebbsfleet's area) would be taken by a new Bishop of Oswestry, suffragan to the Bishop of Lichfield; while oversight of conservative evangelicals (formerly the duties of a Bishop of Maidstone) would be taken by the next Bishop of Ebbsfleet. On 10 December 2024, it was announced that Luke Irvine-Capel, the next Bishop of Richborough, would be "based" in the Diocese of Portsmouth.

An independent review published in 2025 highlighted the unsustainable workload of one complementarian evangelical covering the whole of England and one traditionalist Anglo-Catholic bishop covering the Northern Province. It recommended an additional, part-time bishop for the Northern Province due to higher sacramental demand of Anglo-Catholic parishes and additional "deputisable support" for the Bishop of Ebbsfleet.

== List of PEV and AEO bishops ==
=== Province of Canterbury ===
In the Province of Canterbury:

- Bishop of Richborough: The Right Revd Luke Irvine-Capel SSC
- Bishop of Oswestry: The Right Revd Paul Thomas SSC
- Bishop of Ebbsfleet: The Right Revd Rob Munro. Provides AEO for complementarian evangelicals.
- Bishop of Fulham: The Right Revd Jonathan Baker. Provides AEO for the Diocese of London and Diocese of Southwark.
- Diocese of Chichester, the diocesan Bishop of Chichester: The Right Revd Martin Warner SSC and Bishop of Lewes: The Right Revd Will Hazlewood SSC.

=== Province of York ===
In the Province of York:

- Bishop of Ebbsfleet: The Right Revd Rob Munro. Provides AEO for complementarian evangelicals.
- Bishop of Beverley: The Right Revd Stephen Race SSC
- Diocese of Blackburn: the diocesan Bishop of Blackburn: The Right Revd Philip North CMP

== Oversight areas ==
In the southern province, the Bishops of Oswestry and Richborough minister in 27 of the 30 dioceses. Of the three remaining dioceses, London and Southwark are ministered to by the Bishop of Fulham and Chichester by its diocesan and suffragan bishops. The Bishop of Oswestry serves parishes the western 13 dioceses (Bath and Wells, Birmingham, Bristol, Coventry, Derby, Exeter, Gloucester, Hereford, Lichfield, Oxford, Salisbury, Truro and Worcester), while the Bishop of Richborough serves the eastern half (Canterbury, Chelmsford, Ely, Europe, Guildford, St Edmundsbury & Ipswich, Leicester, Lincoln, Norwich, Peterborough, Portsmouth, Rochester, St Albans and Winchester).

In the northern province, the Bishop of Beverley ministers to 13 of the 14 dioceses, while the Diocese of Blackburn is covered by its diocesan bishop.

The Bishop of Ebbsfleet serves ministers in 32 of the 42 dioceses across both the northern and southern provinces.

A list collated by the Women and the Church in 2025 catalogued 567 parishes that had current petitions for alternative episcopal oversight, 145 of which were complementarian evangelical and 422 were traditional Anglo-Catholic.

== See also ==
- List of Anglo-Catholic churches in England
- Apostolic visitor
- Canonical visitation
- The Society
- Forward in Faith
