= Conservative evangelicalism in the United Kingdom =

Theological movement within Protestantism in the United Kingdom

Conservative evangelicalism is a term used in the United Kingdom to describe a theological movement found within evangelical Protestantism. The term is used more often in this sense (as one strand of evangelicalism), but conservative evangelicals themselves tend to use it interchangeably and synonymously with evangelical. Conservative evangelicals are sometimes called fundamentalists, but they typically reject that label and are keen to maintain their distinct identity, which is more Reformed. Reformed fundamentalism shares many of the characteristics of conservative evangelicalism. In this sense, conservative evangelicalism can be thought of as distinct from liberal evangelicalism, open evangelicalism, and charismatic evangelicalism. Some conservative evangelical groups oppose the ordination of women as ministers or clergy and/or women holding leadership positions.

== History ==
=== Before the Second World War ===
By the 1930s, the term conservative evangelical was being used in contradistinction to liberal evangelical. The points of distinction were largely that while liberal evangelicals "maintain some of the other typical evangelical emphases", they do not maintain, and often repudiate, the total reliability of the Bible, and usually do not preach substitutionary atonement, even if they stress the cross in a doctrinally undefined way.

Organisations such as the Bible Churchman's Missionary Society (now Crosslinks) and the Inter-Varsity Fellowship of Evangelicals Unions (now UCCF) were distinctively conservative evangelical in the Anglican and university spheres respectively, while movements such as the Anglican Evangelical Group Movement and the Student Christian Movement could be described as liberal evangelical, the former organisation glad of the title "Liberal Evangelical".

The conservative evangelical movement was small and as such largely defensive, in part because "in academic circles it was almost universally assumed that a CE view of the Bible was dead". The Keswick Convention, which would later have a very significant role in the shaping of conservative evangelicalism in the UK, was a small outpost of evangelicalism still thoroughly committed to the sufficiency and authority of the Bible.

=== 1960s ===
A key event in the development of British conservative evangelicalism was the 1966 National Assembly of Evangelicals, a convention organised by the Evangelical Alliance. Martyn Lloyd-Jones made an unexpected call for evangelicals to unite as evangelicals and no longer within their "mixed" denominations. This view was motivated by a belief that true Christian fellowship requires evangelical views on central topics such as the atonement and the inspiration of Scripture. The meeting was chaired by the evangelical Anglican John Stott. Lloyd-Jones and Stott were the two leading figures within the conservative evangelical movement at that time, Lloyd-Jones being a key figure to many in the Free Churches and Stott likewise amongst evangelical Anglicans. The two leaders clashed spectacularly as Stott, though not down as a speaker that night, used his role to urge Anglican clergy not to make any rash decisions, saying that Lloyd-Jones' opinion went against history and the Bible.

The following year saw the first National Evangelical Anglican Congress, which was held at Keele University. At this conference, largely due to Stott's influence, evangelical Anglicans committed themselves to full participation in the Church of England, rejecting the separationist approach proposed by Lloyd-Jones.

These two conferences effectively fixed the direction of a large part of the British evangelical community. Although there is an ongoing debate as to the exact nature of Lloyd-Jones's views, they undoubtedly caused the two groupings to adopt diametrically opposed positions. These positions, and the resulting split, continue largely unchanged to this day.

From at least around this time, conservative evangelicals have on occasion been referred to as fundamentalists, but typically reject that label and are keen to maintain their distinct identity, which is more Reformed.

=== 1970s ===
From the war up until the 1960s, conservative evangelicals had been less of a distinct group within evangelicalism than they had before the war. The contributions, during the war, of C. S. Lewis to the evangelical cause helped to blend the lines between conservative evangelicals and others committed to evangelical distinctives from outside the movement. The stand taken by Stott and Lloyd-Jones against the liberalization of Christianity in the 1960s, meant that the biggest disagreements between evangelicals were over how to maintain evangelical distinctives in the light of the increasing shift of the major denominations toward liberalism. However, there were distinctions and disagreements within evangelicalism that went beyond this. With the dawn of the 1970s, evangelicals "were less united than they had been on church policies and on some theological issues." One of the most significant of these was the rise of the relatively young Charismatic movement, which saw the importation of some of what had previously been Pentecostal distinctives into the other mainline Protestant denominations (but at this stage, largely within the evangelical constituency). The impact of this movement was so large that "By the 1970s, it was said, the majority of younger evangelicals in the Church of England were charismatic in outlook."

The conservative evangelical movement can now be said to have a clearer definition from charismaticism. But the two movements could never be clearly separated as "Many congregations included a charismatic element ... This was partly because the more extreme groups tended to leave and form their own congregations, and partly because a charismatic element was more often accepted as a possible constituent of a broader fellowship, even by those who did not share its emphases."

=== 21st century ===
In the 21st century there are an estimated 2 million evangelicals in the UK. According to research performed by the Evangelical Alliance in 2013, 87 per cent of UK evangelicals reported attending Sunday morning church services every week and 63 per cent reported attending weekly or fortnightly small groups. An earlier survey conducted in 2012 found that 92 per cent of evangelicals agreed it is a Christian's duty to help those in poverty, 45 per cent reported attending a church which has a fund or scheme that helps people in immediate need, and 42 per cent reported attending a church that supports or runs a foodbank. Sixty-three per cent believed in tithing and reported giving around 10 per cent of their income to their church, Christian organisations, and various charities. A 2011 report indicated that 83 per cent of UK evangelicals believed that the Bible has supreme authority in guiding their beliefs, views, and behaviour and 52 per cent read or listened to the Bible daily. The Evangelical Alliance, formed in 1846, was the first ecumenical evangelical body in the world and works to unite evangelicals, helping them listen to, and be heard by, the government, media and society.

In December 2014, it was announced that the Church of England would appoint a new Bishop of Maidstone to provide alternative episcopal oversight for conservative evangelical members of the church who take an alternative view on "headship". In September 2015, Rod Thomas was consecrated as the Bishop of Maidstone and became the first flying bishop for conservative evangelicals.

The conservative evangelical presence in the Church of England is represented by groups such as the Church Society, Reform, and the Fellowship of Word and Spirit, whose mission is the continued reformation of the Church of England. In May 2018 these groups officially merged into Church Society. The Anglican Mission in England (supported by GAFCON) and the Free Church of England seek to plant Anglican churches outside the established structures of the Church of England.

In 2007 Word Alive split from Spring Harvest due to the increasingly liberal theology of Spring Harvest leaders, prompted by Steve Chalke's denial of the penal substitution theory of atonement, and along with the Keswick Convention is a distinctly conservative evangelical convention.

In recent years, there has been a resurgence in cross-denominational partnerships between conservative evangelicals (which suffered in the disagreement between John Stott and Martyn Lloyd-Jones), particularly in the training of gospel workers. Such initiatives include 9:38, the Proclamation Trust (who run the Cornhill Training Course), and the Gospel Partnerships (who run the Ministry Training Course).

== See also ==
- Anti-Catholicism in the United Kingdom
- Conservative Christianity
- Church of England (Continuing)
- Higher Life movement
- John Smyth (barrister)
- Protestantism in the United Kingdom
