= Anglican Network in Europe =

Anglican realignment proto-province

- Abbreviation: ANiE
- Classification: Anglican
- Orientation: Primarily evangelical and Reformed; Confessing Movement
- Polity: Episcopal
- Presiding Bishop: The Rt. Rev. Andy Lines
- Associations: GAFCON
- Region: Europe
- Origin: 2020
- Separated from: Church of England, Church in Wales, Scottish Episcopal Church
- Congregations: 116 (2026)
- Official website: https://www.anglicannetwork.org/

The Anglican Network in Europe (ANiE) is a Christian denomination in the Anglican tradition with churches in Europe (primarily in England). Formed as part of the worldwide Anglican realignment, it is a member jurisdiction of the Global Fellowship of Confessing Anglicans (GAFCON) and is under the primatial oversight of the chairman of the GAFCON Primates Council. ANiE runs in parallel with the Free Church of England (RECUK). GAFCON recognizes ANiE as a "proto-province" operating separately from the Church of England, the Scottish Episcopal Church, the Church in Wales and other Anglican Communion jurisdictions in Great Britain and the European continent. ANiE is the body hierarchically above the preexisting Anglican Mission in England; the former is the equivalent of a province whilst the latter is a convocation, the equivalent of a diocese.

== History ==
ANiE's origins date to 2013, when Anglican bishops at the second Global Anglican Future Conference in Nairobi endorsed the provision of episcopal oversight for Anglicans who could not in good conscience remain in their local dioceses or provinces. "We commit ourselves to the support and defence of those who in standing for apostolic truth are marginalized or excluded from formal communion with other Anglicans in their dioceses. We have therefore recognized the Anglican Mission in England (AMiE) as an expression of authentic Anglicanism both for those within and outside the Church of England," the 2013 GAFCON communique said.

AMiE was initially "authorised by the GAFCON Primates to work within and, where necessary, outside the structures of the Church of England as a missionary society." Anglican priest Andy Lines was designated general secretary for AMiE, for which episcopal oversight was provided by a panel of bishops led by John Ellison, a retired Bishop of Paraguay. In 2015, Ellison was investigated by the Diocese of Salisbury due to his service as an overseer for AMiE's Christ Church Salisbury. In 2016, AMiE unveiled a plan to plant 25 churches by 2025 and 250 churches by 2050.

In 2017, in anticipation of the Scottish Episcopal Church becoming the first Anglican church in the British isles to approve same-sex marriage, the GAFCON Primates Council meeting in Lagos authorized the consecration of a missionary bishop for Europe to support Anglican clergy and churches in Great Britain that could no longer in good conscience remain within the Canterbury-aligned church structures:

During our meeting, we considered how best to respond to the voice of faithful Anglicans in some parts of the Global North who are in need of biblically faithful episcopal leadership. Of immediate concern is the reality that on 8th June 2017 the Scottish Episcopal Church is likely to formalize their rejection of Jesus' teaching on marriage. If this were to happen, faithful Anglicans in Scotland will need appropriate pastoral care. In addition, within England there are churches that have, for reasons of conscience, been planted outside of the Church of England by the Anglican Mission in England (AMiE). These churches are growing, and are in need of episcopal leadership. Therefore, we have decided to consecrate a missionary bishop who will be tasked with providing episcopal leadership for those who are outside the structures of any Anglican province, especially in Europe.

On June 30, 2017, Anglican Church in North America Primate Foley Beach consecrated Lines as missionary bishop to Europe on behalf of GAFCON. The consecration was attended by 1,400 Anglican representatives from all over the world, including 11 primates, 3 archbishops, and 13 bishops. The Primates who attended were Nicholas Okoh (Nigeria), Stanley Ntagali (Uganda), Daniel Deng Bul (Sudan and South Sudan), Jacob Chimeledya (Tanzania), Jackson Ole Sapit (Kenya), Onesphore Rwaje (Rwanda), Zacharie Masimango Katanda (Congo), Daniel Sarfo (West Africa), Gregory Venables (South America), Ng Moon Hing (Southeast Asia), and Mouneer Anis (Jerusalem and the Middle East). Lines ordained the first clergy specifically called to AMiE in December 2017 and provided oversight in Scotland through the Scottish Anglican Network under the auspices of ACNA member diocese the Anglican Network in Canada.

In 2020, the GAFCON Primates Council voted to establish the Anglican Network in Europe as a "proto-province" with a presiding bishop and two convocations: the AMiE and the newly formed Anglican Convocation Europe (ACE). In 2022, four new assistant bishops were appointed to assist Lines in AMiE and ACE.

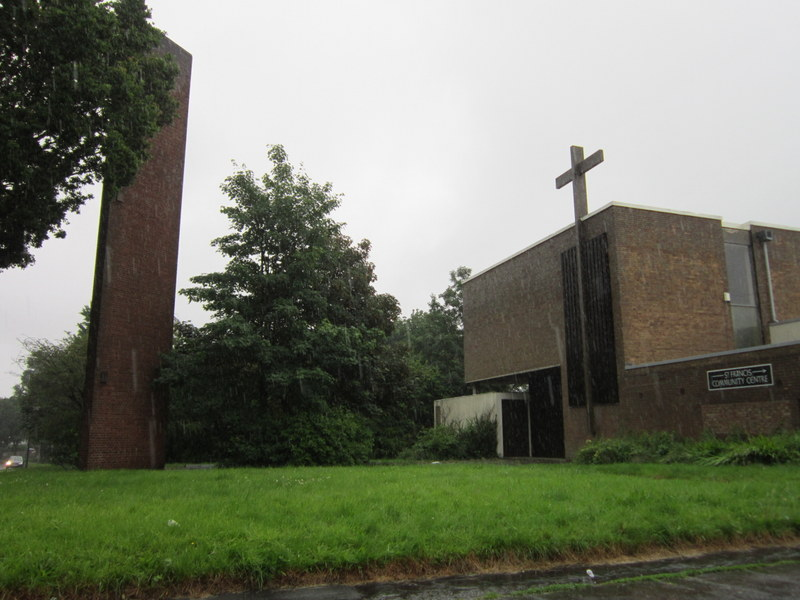
Church of Restoration (the former St. Francis' Church) is the headquarters of Anglican Missionary Congregations in Manchester.

In 2024, the Church of Nigeria released Anglican Missionary Congregations (AMC), a group of congregations serving Nigerian expatriates in Europe, to the jurisdiction of ANiE. AMC became the ANiE's third convocation.

== Beliefs ==
In its canons and constitution, ANiE "receives and accepts as its Doctrinal Basis the Canonical books of the Old and New Testaments as the inspired Word of God, containing all things necessary for salvation, and the final authority and unchangeable standard for Christian faith and life."

As "faithful expressions of this doctrine," ANiE accepts the faith as summarized in the Apostles' Creed, the Nicene Creed and the Athanasian Creed; the 1662 Book of Common Prayer and the Ordinal; the Thirty-Nine Articles of Religion agreed in 1562 and finalized upon incorporation into the BCP in 1571; and GAFCON's Jerusalem Statement and Declaration of 2008. These doctrinal commitments cannot be amended by future ANiE synods.

== Structure ==
ANiE encompasses three convocations that function as dioceses, each with its own character; field of operation; and its own constitution, canons and synod. The network is governed by a presiding bishop and a synod including representatives, clergy and lay, from the member convocations. The basic level of organization is the local congregation. Each congregation is part of a convocation led by bishops. The two convocations, AMiE and ACE, may have overlapping jurisdictions, with at least one ACE congregation located in England.

ANiE's operations remain provisional, and according to the network's canons, "ANiE looks forward to the day, when under God, this provincial framework becomes a fully operational Province where the Presiding Bishop and the Province take their place in the councils of the Church."

=== Convocations ===
Diocese	Territory	Cathedral	Bishop(s)	Founded	Number of Congregations (2024)
Anglican Mission in England	England	None	Tim Davies; Assistant: Lee McMunn	2013	36
Anglican Convocation Europe	Europe	None	Andy Lines; Assistants: Stuart Bell (Wales), Josep Rossello (Spain); Retired: Ian Ferguson (Scotland)	2020	25
Anglican Missionary Congregations	Europe	None	Gideon Ilechukwu	2024	56

== Churchmanship ==
ANiE's structure and canons allow for a range of Anglican churchmanship and doctrinal distinctives within the framework of the doctrinal commitments summarized above. For example, AMiE represents the conservative evangelical thread in Anglicanism often represented by Reform in the Church of England or the Anglican Diocese of Sydney. AMiE's canons forbid Anglo-Catholic vesture, take a strict approach to remarriage after divorce, and require doctrinal subscription for church membership. The ACE canons are looser and encompass the Anglo-Catholic and charismatic traditions within Anglicanism.

In alignment with the Anglican Church in North America, ANiE also encompasses diverse views on the ordination of women. AMiE holds complementarian views, forbidding the ordination of women as priests or bishops and debating the ordination of female deacons. "It offers a theological defence of this position, affirming the equality of men and women as 'created image bearers of God,' and the ministry of men and women as 'equally valid, valuable and necessary in God's eyes,' and yet 'only godly and gifted male candidates' will be admitted by AMiE to the presbyterate," says Justin Welby biographer Andrew Atherstone. By contract, ACE permits the ordination of women as deacons and priests but not as bishops "out of respect for the diversity of views within global Anglicanism, and for the sake of unity."

== Ecumenical relations ==
ANiE is in full communion with GAFCON member provinces representing approximately 40 million of the 85 million worldwide Anglicans, including the Anglican Church in Brazil, Anglican Church of Chile, Province of the Anglican Church of the Congo, Anglican Church of Kenya, Church of the Province of Myanmar, Church of Nigeria, Anglican Church in North America, Province of the Anglican Church of Rwanda, Anglican Church of South America, Province of the Episcopal Church of South Sudan, and the Church of Uganda.

ANiE also has communion with other Anglican jurisdictions that are GAFCON affiliates in Europe and worldwide, including the Reformed Evangelical Anglican Church of South Africa, Church of Confessing Anglicans Aotearoa New Zealand, Free Church of England, Reformed Episcopal Church, Diocese of the Southern Cross and several GAFCON-affiliated dioceses of the Anglican churches of Australia, Tanzania and West Africa.

ANiE is not in communion with the Church of England nor a member of the Canterbury-recognized Anglican Communion but according to Jonathan Baker, the Bishop of Fulham, "There are various contacts at a personal level, both locally and at church leadership level, between clergy as well as laity of the Church of England and AMiE, and as far as it is possible to work constructively alongside AMiE, the Church of England seeks to do so."
