= Proprietary chapel =

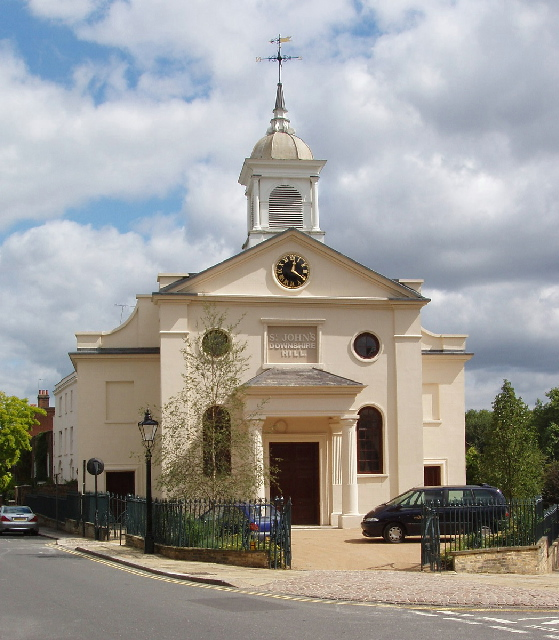
St John's Downshire Hill, Hampstead

A proprietary chapel is a chapel that originally belonged to a private person, but with the intention that it would be open to the public, rather than restricted (as with private chapels in the stricter sense) to members of a family or household, or members of an institution. Generally, however, some of the seating—sometimes a substantial proportion—would be reserved for subscribers.

== Background ==
In 19th-century Britain they were common, often being built to cope with urbanisation. Frequently they were set up by evangelical philanthropists with a vision of spreading Christianity in cities whose needs could no longer be met by the parishes. Some functioned more privately, with a wealthy person building a chapel so they could invite their favourite preachers. They are anomalies in English ecclesiastical law, having no parish area, but being able to have an Anglican clergyman licensed there.

During the first half of the nineteenth century "proprietary" chapels flourished in Belgravia, Bath, and other fashionable resorts. They were extra-parochial, and were often run on a commercial basis, supported by pew-rents and sometimes built over wine vaults ... An ingratiating preacher, preferably an invalid ..., a well-nourished verger, and genteel pew-openers did their best to attract the quality ... An advertisement from the Times (1852) gives a good idea of the "ethos" of the proprietary chapel "A young man of family, evangelically disposed, and to whom salary is no object, may hear of a cure in a fashionable West End congregation by addressing the Reverend A.M.O. at Hatchards, Booksellers, Piccadilly."

Historically a number of Anglican churches were proprietary chapels. Over the years, many were converted into normal parishes (for example Redland Parish Church in Bristol), but some remain as functioning proprietary chapels. Those chapels which though extant no longer consider themselves to be part of the Church of England are listed under "Former proprietary chapels".

== Current proprietary chapels ==
- Christ Church in Bath. The church was founded in 1798 in order that those who could not afford pew rents would have somewhere to worship.
- Emmanuel Church in Wimbledon, London.
- St James's Church in Avonwick, Devon. The church was dedicated on 6 August 1878. It was built as a proprietary chapel by the Cornish-Bowden family, whose descendants still own the church.
- St John's Downshire Hill in Hampstead, London.
- St Peter-in-Ely. Catharine Maria Sparke, widow of Canon Edward Bowyer Sparke, decided to build a church in memory of her husband who had been keenly aware of the need for a church for Ely's riverside district. On St Peter's Day, 1889 the foundation stone was laid and on Monday 30 June 1890 the church was dedicated to St Peter by the Bishop of Ely, Lord Alwyne Compton.
- Trinity Church, Buxton, Derbyshire.

== Former proprietary chapels ==
- St James' Church in Ryde on the Isle of Wight. This was formerly a proprietary chapel within the Church of England, but in 2020 it resolved to become part of the Anglican Mission in England.
- St Mary's Church, Castle Street, Reading (not to be confused with the larger but similarly named Minster Church of St Mary the Virgin, which is only a few yards away) is an extant church which formerly functioned as a proprietary chapel within the Church of England, but now forms part of the Church of England (Continuing).
- St Ninian's Church, Whitby is a proprietary chapel. Since leaving the Church of England in the 1990s, it has been successively a part of the Holy Catholic Church (Anglican Rite), the Anglican Catholic Church (UK) and the Catholic Church of England and Wales (CCEW). It is now run by a group of supporters.
- St John the Evangelist's Church, Chichester is a redundant former proprietary chapel which is now in the care of the Churches Conservation Trust but it is still used for concerts and occasional services.
- St John's Chapel, Bedford Row (demolished 1863) was formerly a proprietary chapel.
- Trinity Chapel, Conduit Street, London, was a proprietary chapel from its establishment in 1691 until demolition in 1875.

== See also ==
- Cappella gentilizia
- Proprietary church
