= Holy Cross Cathedral (Loganville, Georgia) =

Anglican cathedral in Loganville, Georgia

Coordinates: 33°51′08″N 83°54′56″W

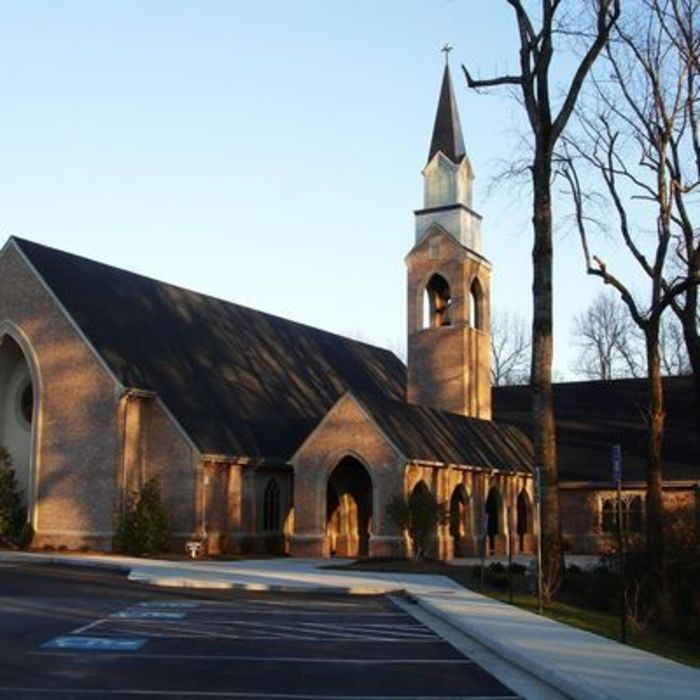
- Holy Cross Cathedral
- Location: Loganville, Georgia
- Country: United States
- Denomination: Anglican Church in North America
- Previous denomination: Anglican Church of South America
- Website: hcanglican.org

History
- Founded: 2004
- Founder: The Most Rev. Foley Beach
- Dedicated: 2005

Administration
- Diocese: South

Clergy
- Bishop: The Most Rev. Foley Beach
- Dean: The Very Rev. Michael Guernsey (November 2018 to December 2025)

Holy Cross Cathedral is an evangelical Anglican church in Loganville, Georgia. Founded in 2004 as part of the Anglican realignment, it serves today as the cathedral parish for the Anglican Diocese of the South and the diocesan seat of the Primate of the Anglican Church in North America, Foley Beach.

== History ==
Holy Cross Anglican Church was founded in February 2004 when Foley Beach, then a priest in the Episcopal Diocese of Atlanta, departed the Episcopal Church in response to the consecration of Gene Robinson as bishop of New Hampshire. The church plant dedicated its current building at 3836 Oak Grove Road in Loganville in late 2005. In 2009, Holy Cross was the site of the inaugural gathering of the Order of the Daughters of the Holy Cross, an Anglican women's organization.

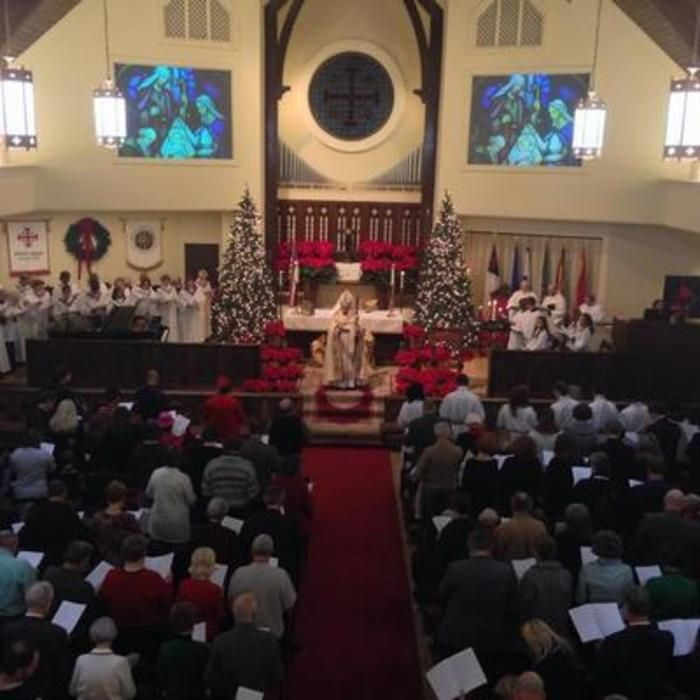
A Christmastide service at Holy Cross Cathedral.

During Holy Cross's early years, it was under the episcopal oversight of Bishop Frank Lyons in the Anglican Church of South America's Diocese of Bolivia. In 2010, Beach was elected and consecrated as the first bishop of the Diocese of the South. He remained as rector of Holy Cross until 2013, when he transitioned to full-time episcopal ministry and was succeeded by Henry Baldwin. In 2015, Holy Cross was designated as the diocese's cathedral and rebranded as Holy Cross Cathedral. Baldwin was succeeded as rector by Michael Guernsey. Guernsey stepped down in December 2025 following an investigation into problems with leadership and communication.

== Programs ==
As the cathedral of the Diocese of the South, Holy Cross hosts diocesan offices and important events like synods and diaconal ordinations.

The cathedral offers an on-site columbarium for interments in its chapel.

Holy Cross's congregation includes members from as many as 23 different nationalities, according to Beach.
