= Stuart Bell (bishop) =

Welsh Anglican bishop

The Right Reverend Stuart Bell
- Bishop
- Church: Anglican Network in Europe
- Diocese: Anglican Mission in England, Anglican Convocation Europe

Orders
- Ordination: 1972 (priest)
- Consecration: 18 March 2023 by Foley Beach

Personal details
- Denomination: Anglicanism
- Spouse: Prudence
- Children: 3
- Education

Stuart Rodney Bell is an Assistant Bishop in the Anglican Convocation in Europe with primary responsibility for Wales. He was consecrated on March 18, 2023, becoming the first Assistant Bishop in Wales for the Anglican Network in Europe, a "proto-province" recognized by the Global Fellowship of Confessing Anglicans. He was formerly a Canon of the Church in Wales and a former rector of St Michael's Church, Aberystwyth.

A native of Torquay, Bell sought ordination, expressing a call to Wales. He learned the Welsh language and began his ministry in 1971. He identified himself with the Evangelical wing of the church, and was involved in the Evangelical Fellowship of the Church in Wales. In 1988 he became rector of Aberystwyth, in charge of Saint Michael's and All Angels, Aberystwyth, which he claimed had the largest Anglican congregation in Wales.

Bell was appointed Bishop of Wales in August 2022 by Archbishop Foley Beach along with Bishop Andy Lines to act as the assistant bishop with responsibility for Wales, and consecrated in Aberystwyth on 18 March 2023. He currently is leading a new Anglican church, Fellowship 345, in Rhydypennau, near Aberystwyth.

== Personal life ==
Bell is married to Prudence, and together they have three children.

== Bibliography ==
- "New Anglican jurisdiction is launched for Europe". Anglican Ink. Anglican Link. 8 December 2020.
- "New bishops for the Anglican Network in Europe". Anglican Ink. Anglican Link. 10 October 2022.
- "Anglican Network in Europe - Stuart Bell Consecration Service". www.anglicannetwork.org.
- Bell, Stuart R. (2022). Recovering his reputation : The ministry of a late developer. Wales. ISBN 979-8444394014.
- "UK news in brief". www.churchtimes.co.uk.
- "Stuart's Bell Consecration | GAFCON". www.gafcon.org.
- Grey-Warter, Philip de (18 March 2023). "Stuart Bell consecrated for Wales". Anglican Ink © 2023.
- "Stuart Bell". Wales Leadership Forum.
