= Stuart Bell (disambiguation) =

Stuart Bell (1938–2012) was a British Labour Party politician.

Stuart Bell is also the name of:

- Stuart Bell (bishop), bishop in Wales, consecrated 2023
- Stuart R. Bell (born 1957), American academic
- Stuart Bell (writer) (born 1987), English writer, editor and translator of French literature
