= Ernest Stroud =

Cleric of the Church of England (1931–2014)

Ernest Charles Frederick Stroud (20 May 1931 – 18 June 2014) was an English Anglican clergyman who was Archdeacon of Colchester from 1983 to 1997.

Stroud was educated at Merrywood Grammar School and Durham University. and ordained in 1961. He worked for Esso before ordination in 1961. After a curacy in South Kirkby he was Priest in charge at St Ninian, Whitby. He was Vicar of All Saints, Chelmsford then of St Margaret of Antioch, Leigh on Sea before his years as an Archdeacon. Stroud died on 18 June 2014, at the age of 83.

== Notes ==
Church of England titles
Preceded by James William Roxburgh	Archdeacon of Colchester; 1983–1997	Succeeded by Martin William Wallace
