= Church of Confessing Anglicans Aotearoa/New Zealand =

Christian denomination in New Zealand

Coordinates: 43.509°S 172.639°E

- Classification: Anglican
- Orientation: Confessing Movement
- Polity: Episcopal
- Bishop: Jay Behan
- Associations: GAFCON
- Region: New Zealand
- Language: English
- Headquarters: St Albans, Christchurch, New Zealand
- Origin: 2019
- Separated from: Anglican Church in Aotearoa, New Zealand and Polynesia
- Parishes: 20
- Official website: confessinganglicans.nz

The Church of Confessing Anglicans Aotearoa/New Zealand (CCAANZ) is an evangelical Anglican denomination in New Zealand. It is not a member of the Anglican Communion as recognised by the current Archbishop of Canterbury, but is recognised by the Global Anglican Future Conference (GAFCON). The church consists of 20 parishes, some of which consist of clergy and church members who left the Anglican Church in Aotearoa, New Zealand and Polynesia after it allowed bishops to authorise blessings of same-sex marriages, and some of which were newly established at the time of the formation of the church.

== History ==
The Church of Confessing Anglicans Aotearoa/New Zealand grew out of the New Zealand branch of the Fellowship of Confessing Anglicans and was established on 17 May 2019. This followed the decision by the Anglican Church in Aotearoa, New Zealand and Polynesia to allow the blessing of same-sex marriages and civil unions.

== Leadership ==
Bishop Jay Behan of the Church of Confessing Anglicans Aotearoa/New Zealand

Jay Behan is the inaugural bishop. Behan's episcopal consecration took place on 19 October 2019, led by Archbishop Foley Beach of the Anglican Church in North America, the chairman of GAFCON Primates' Council. The consecration service was attended by several representatives of GAFCON, including Archbishop Laurent Mbanda of the Anglican Church of Rwanda and Archbishop Glenn Davies of the Anglican Diocese of Sydney (among nine bishops of the Anglican Church of Australia), Bishop Andy Lines of the Anglican Mission in England and the retired Bishop Derek Eaton of the Anglican Diocese of Nelson in New Zealand. Bishop Richard Ellena also a former Bishop of Nelson was present, and brought greeting from the New Zealand Church Missionary Society.

== Structure ==
CCAANZ is an autonomous, extra-provincial Anglican diocese governed by a synod comprising representatives from all member parishes. The synod elects a standing committee with delegated authority when synod is out of session.

As of September 2024 CCAANZ has 20 member parishes.

== Beliefs and practices ==
CCAANZ describes its core beliefs as:

- Faith is in one God – Father, Son, and Holy Spirit.
- Hope is in the only Saviour, Jesus Christ, who died and rose again for us.
- Final authority and unchangeable standard for Christian faith and life is the Bible.
- Doctrine is expressed in the Apostles, Nicene and Athanasian Creeds, the Book of Common Prayer (1662), the 39 Articles of Religion, and the Ordinal.
- Acceptance of the Jerusalem Declaration as a contemporary expression of Anglican doctrine and practice.

CCAANZ ordains women and men as priests and deacons.
