= David Samuel =

David Samuel may refer to:

- David Samuel, 3rd Viscount Samuel (1922-2014), Israeli member of the British House of Lords
- David Samuel (bishop) (born 1930), Continuing Anglican bishop in England
- David Samuel (rugby union) (1869–1943), Welsh international rugby union forward

== See also ==
- David Samuels (disambiguation)
