= St John's Downshire Hill =

St John's Church, Downshire Hill
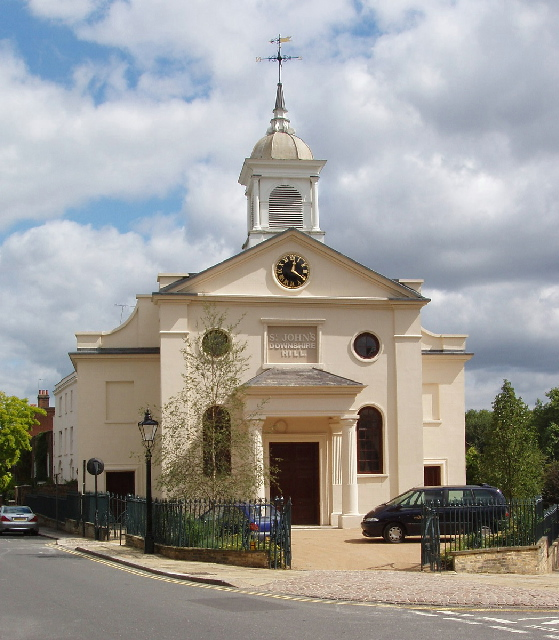
- St John's Downshire Hill, Hampstead
- St John's Church, Downshire Hill
- 51°33′21″N 00°10′11″W
- OS grid reference: TQ 26982 85697
- Country: England
- Denomination: Church of England
- Churchmanship: Conservative evangelical
- Website: sjdh.org

History
- Dedication: St John

Architecture
- Heritage designation: Grade I listed
- Completed: 1823

Administration
- Diocese: Diocese of London
- Archdeaconry: Hampstead
- Deanery: North Camden
- Parish: St Stephen with All Hallows

Clergy
- Bishop: The Rt Revd Rob Munro (AEO)

St John's Downshire Hill, Hampstead, is a proprietary chapel of the Church of England, located in Downshire Hill, Hampstead, London, in the Parish of St Stephen with All Hallows. Referred to as St John's Church, the building is formally a chapel. The church should not be confused with St John-at-Hampstead, which is located in Church Row, Hampstead, being the parish church of what is now the neighbouring parish.

== History ==
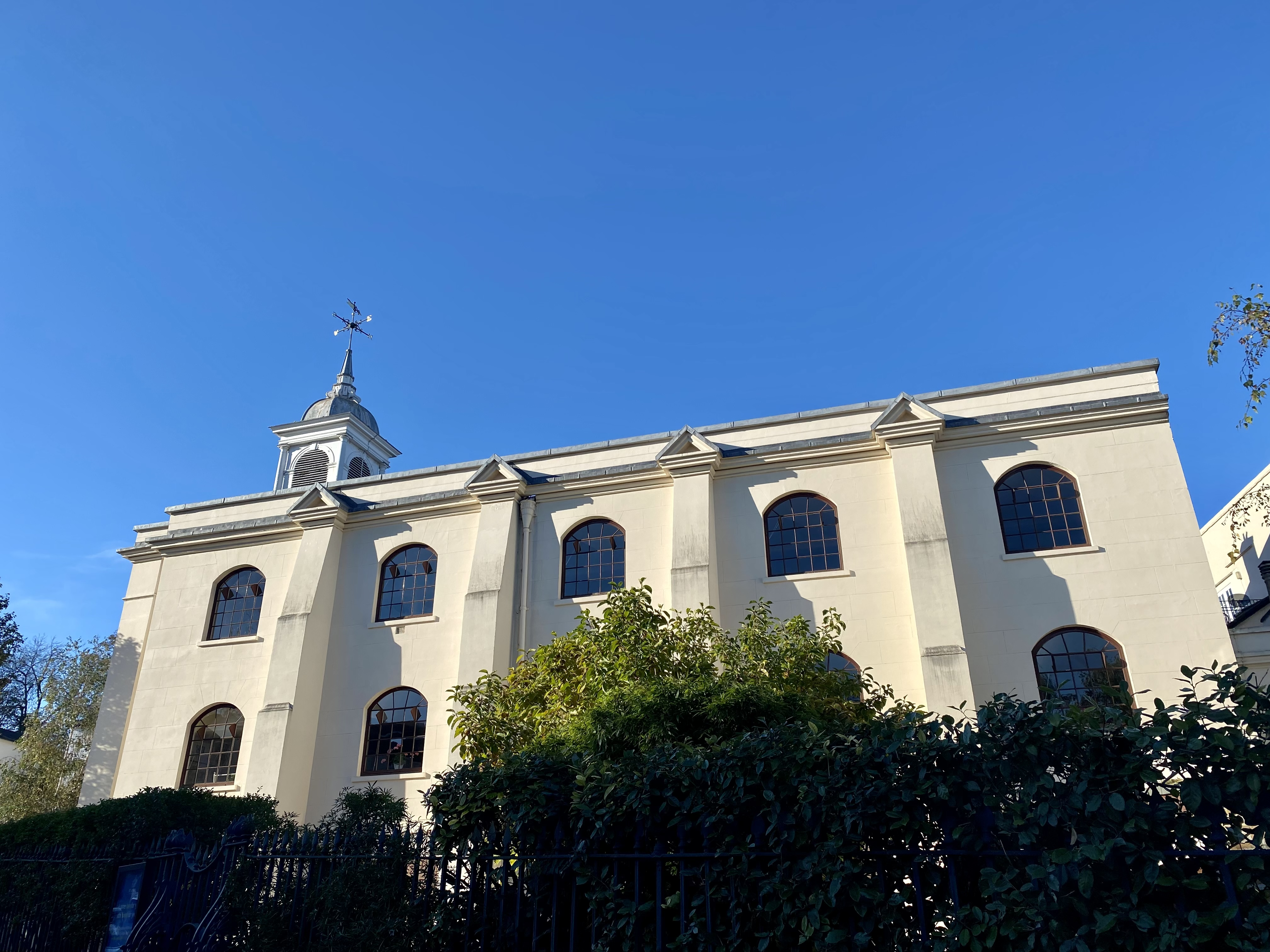
A view of St John's from Keats Grove

=== Construction and first services ===
During a period in which much of the surrounding area was being developed, a new church was considered as an essential local amenity. The copyhold for the site of the church on Downshire Hill was purchased from the Manor of Belsize in 1812 by a group which passed this in 1817 to a trio comprising Christian minister James Curry, "speculative" builder William Woods and lawyer Edward Carlisle, Woods being involved in other development, both in Hampstead and elsewhere in London. Curry had offered to pay the cost of the building project if he was appointed minister. The dedication of the new church to St John may indicate that it was originally intended as a chapel of ease for the parish church of St John-at-Hampstead.

The building was completed in 1823, with the first service held on 26 October 1823. The first minister of the church was William Harness, a lifelong friend of Lord Byron (Curry had fallen ill by the time of the church's opening, and died soon after the opening; Woods also surrendered his interest in the building in January 1824). Harness departed in 1825 and was followed by a group of four ministers who remained for only short period.

=== Controversy in 1832 ===
In 1832, the copyhold was purchased by John Wilcox, an admirer of George Whitefield, with the aid of a loan from a local dissenter. Wilcox established evangelical ministry at the church, but encountered opposition from Samuel White, perpetual curate of the parish of St John, Hampstead, whose permission was required to conduct services in the parish, since Downshire Hill was at that time located in the same parish. Unlike Wilcox, who was the son of a Gloucester publican, White had effectively inherited his curacy in Hampstead from his father, and a contemporary periodical noted theological differences between White and Wilcox's Calvinist doctrinal position. Wilcox had made known that he would preach as a dissenter if not given permission to as an Anglican minister and, after he ignored a letter from White informing him he did not have White's permission to officiate at services at St John's Downshire Hill, White began proceedings against Wilcox for officiating without the permission of the incumbent.

A consistory court ruled in favour of White, but local feeling was on the side of Wilcox. The poet John Keats, who was living nearby at the time in what is now Keats House had earlier referred to White as "the Person of Hampstead quarrelling with all the world" and a petition was organised and signed by influential local people including the then Lord of the Manor of Belsize, Lord Galloway, and Sara Coleridge. The outcome of the case also attracted strong criticism at the time in the Church of England magazine:

"In the existing state, therefore, of our Ecclesiastical law, a clergyman may incur every penalty for preaching, praying and administering the Sacrament, which he could incur were he guilty of adultery, drunkenness, profane swearing, or other outrageous and abominable conduct... It will be observed that this decision has no reference whatever to any real or supposed want of religious instruction in the parish...[T]he existing chapel on Downshire Hill may perish with the dry rot – may be turned into... a Ballroom, a Theatre or a Gambling House, but according to existing law, it can never be opened as a place of worship for the Church of England, until the Incumbent of the parish gives consent."

The decision of the court prevailed, with the church closing until 1835. The church's name remained infamous in ecclesiastical circles for some years following. Wilcox remained in the area during this time, apparently devoting his time to educating local children at a St John's Church School which he had founded at his own expense, also on Downshire Hill, before dying in December 1835.

=== 1835–1916 ===
In 1835, an alternative minister was found who was approved of by Dr White: John Ayre was minister of St John's between 1835 and 1855; he remained the longest-standing minister of St John's for many years after.

In 1862, the copyhold of the church was converted to a freehold, following a payment by the official copyholder at that time.

With the need for increased capacity to accommodate churchgoers, a new parish church in the area was planned. In 1863, St John's was proposed as the new parish church. The proposal was rejected on the grounds that the 900 capacity of the church was too small, although in 1851 1,370 attended a service with a sermon delivered by the Archbishop of Canterbury. The plot was also considered too small to rebuild a larger church which led to a new parish church being built nearby at Rosslyn Hill named St. Stephen's, with the then minister of St John's Downshire Hill, Joshua Kirkman, becoming the first vicar of St. Stephen's.

The scholar Robert Baker Girdlestone was minister of St John's from 1889 to 1903.

=== 1916–present ===
In 1916, following financial difficulties during the First World War, the freehold was bought by Mr Albert Leslie Wright, the son of Rev. Henry Wright who had been the minister 1872–1880. Leslie Wright then leased the church back to the congregation for a nominal rent. In his will he directed that trustees "postpone the sale of the said chapel so long as there is sufficient congregation", with the choice of trustees (CPAS) ensuring that the church would continue along evangelical lines following his death. Leslie Wright died in 1938, with the church continuing to operate according to these provisions until the freehold of the property was purchased by the congregation from Wright's trustees in 2003.

The church has had strong links to overseas Christian mission, with Rev. Henry Wright beginning an enduring link with the Church Missionary Society, donations to missionary societies forming the largest item of expenditure annually from the earliest church records (1872) until World War I, and various ministers involved in overseas missionary work, including Douglas Butcher (1957–1960, was Honorary Canon of Cairo cathedral and later returned to the Middle East), Douglas Paterson (1962–1965, later joined the Ruanda Mission) and Kenneth Howell (1972–1979, earlier first Bishop of Chile, Bolivia and Peru).

Tom Watts was licensed as the senior minister of St John's in January 2018.

The chapel stands in the conservative evangelical tradition, and has passed resolutions rejecting the leadership and/or ordination of women. It receives alternative episcopal oversight from the Bishop of Ebbsfleet (currently Rob Munro).

== Building ==
The church building is Grade I listed and has a Regency stuccoed, cream-painted facade. Its notable features include a Doric porch, portico and cupola and a double-staircased vestibule. The main auditorium features a five-bay nave and galleries on three sides.

The church has no recessed chancel, inscribed panels (previously along with a prominent pulpit and small communion table, although these are no longer present), along with a frieze of biblical text (in gold lettering). The features are characteristic of the emphasis on preaching in evangelical Anglican churches during the period of initial construction.

The original wooden box pews are still present in the church. The pews were moved to the sides of the church during the renovation of 2003–4.

The east window features an eagle, a symbol of St John and the biblical gospel. There is a Bevington & Sons organ in the west gallery, built in 1873 and installed in 1880. The clock on the front of the building was made in 1823 by John Moore and Son of Clerkenwell.

The building received major renovations in 1896, 1950 (following war damage), 1973, 1982 and 2004, in each case following fundraising appeals. During the 2003-4 renovations, foundations were put in and an undercroft constructed.

== As the sole proprietary chapel in the Diocese of London ==
Although in the 19th century, there were upwards of 50 proprietary chapels in London, St John's Downshire Hill is now the only proprietary chapel remaining in the present Diocese of London, and one of only a handful in the whole of England. As such, it is effectively financially independent of the Church of England, neither contributing or receiving from Diocese funds. The ongoing running costs, including the costs of employing its full-time staff and the upkeep of the building, are provided entirely by the present congregation.
