= Foley Beach =

American Anglican bishop

The Most Reverend Foley Beach D.D.
- Archbishop of the Anglican Church in North America
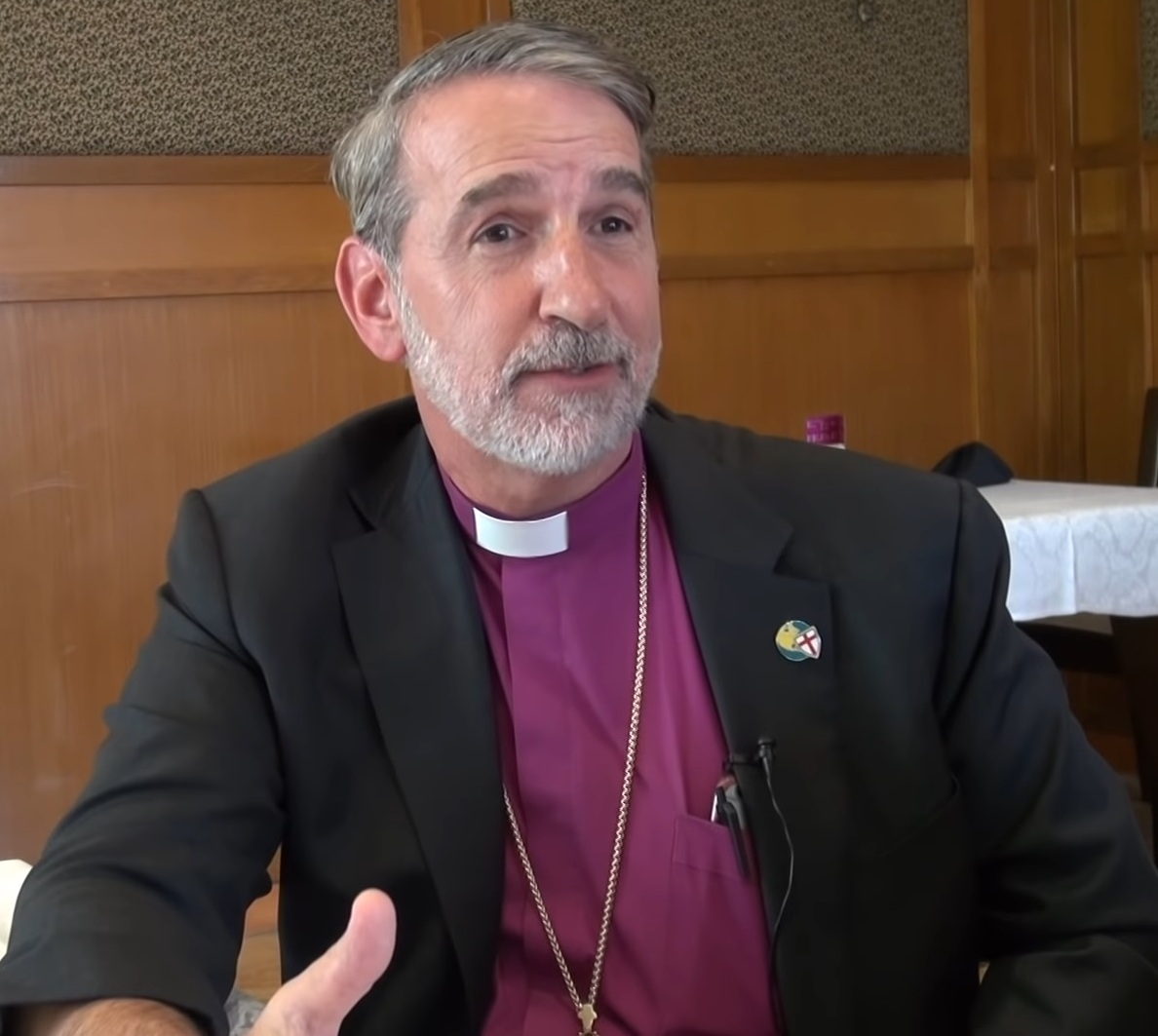
- Archbishop Beach in 2018
- Church: Anglican Church in North America
- Diocese: Anglican Diocese of the South
- In office: 2014–2024
- Predecessor: Robert Duncan
- Successor: Steve Wood
- Other post: Bishop of the Anglican Diocese of the South (2010–present)

Orders
- Ordination: 1992
- Consecration: October 9, 2010 by Robert Duncan

Personal details
- Born: October 31, 1958 (age 68) Atlanta, Georgia, U.S.
- Education: Georgia State University; University of the South

Ordination history
History
Episcopal consecration
- Consecrated by: Robert Duncan
Episcopal succession
Bishops consecrated by Foley Beach as principal consecrator
- Keith Andrews: January 25, 2015
- Ronald Jackson: January 8, 2016
- Andy Lines: June 30, 2017
- Walter Banek: August 23, 2017
- Michael Williams: April 12, 2018
- Mark Nordstrom: April 12, 2018
- Andrew Williams: March 16, 2019
- Ryan Reed: September 21, 2019
- Jay Behan: October 19, 2019
- Mark Engel: February 13, 2021
- Steven Tighe: March 6, 2021
- Alan J. Hawkins: November 5, 2021
- Dan Gifford: February 6, 2022
- Chip Edgar: March 12, 2022
- Alex Cameron: August 6, 2022
- Willie J. Hill Jr.: August 13, 2022
- Alex Farmer: August 27, 2022
- Tim Davies: October 21, 2022
- Ian Ferguson: October 21, 2022
- Lee McMunn: October 21, 2022
- Christopher Warner: February 18, 2023
- Stuart Bell: March 18, 2023
- Bill Jenkins: April 29, 2023
- Brian Wallace: September 9, 2023
- Benjamin Fischer: February 5, 2024
- Jacob Worley: February 24, 2024
- Allen Kannapell: March 16, 2024
- Charlie Camlin: March 21, 2024
- Mike Stewart: March 23, 2024
- Darryl Fitzwater: October 4, 2024

Foley Thomas Beach (born October 31, 1958) is an American Anglican bishop. He was the second primate and archbishop of the Anglican Church in North America, a church associated with the Anglican realignment movement, and is the first diocesan bishop of the Anglican Diocese of the South. Beach was elected as the church's primate on June 21, 2014. His enthronement took place on October 9, 2014. During his primacy, he served as chairman of the Global Fellowship of Confessing Anglicans Primates Council and led the ACNA through a period that included the COVID-19 pandemic.

== Early life and ministry ==
Beach was born on October 31, 1958, in Atlanta, Georgia. He studied at Georgia State University in Atlanta, receiving a B.A. degree in 1980. A member of the Episcopal Church, Beach worked as a youth minister at the Episcopal Cathedral of Saint Philip, in Atlanta, from 1980 to 1987, and a lay associate minister at the Church of the Apostles, in Atlanta, from 1987 to 1989. Beach is a graduate of the School of Theology of the University of the South, where he received an M.Div. degree in 1992. He was ordained a deacon and a priest in the Episcopal Diocese of Atlanta in 1992. He was nominated deacon-in-charge, afterwards rector, of St. Alban's Episcopal Church, in Monroe, Georgia, where he served from 1992 to 2004. He left the Episcopal Church following the consecration of Gene Robinson as the first openly non-celibate gay bishop of the Anglican Communion. He was later deposed as a priest (sometimes referred to as defrocking) by the Episcopal Diocese of Atlanta in July 2004, although he had been received and placed in good standing as a priest in the Diocese of Bolivia in the Anglican Communion. Beach then planted Holy Cross Anglican Church in Loganville, Georgia, which held its first service on February 8, 2004 with over 350 in attendance.

Beach was elected as the first bishop of the Anglican Diocese of the South, a newly formed diocese of the Anglican Church in North America, as well as rector and pastor of Holy Cross Anglican Church in Loganville, Georgia, since its founding, from February 2004 to December 2013. It became the diocese's pro-cathedral in 2010, and it is now the cathedral church of both the Anglican Diocese of the South and of Anglican Church in North America's primate. After the formation of the Anglican Church in North America in June 2009, Beach was elected the leader of a group of parishes in the Southeast and was consecrated as the first bishop of the Diocese of the South on October 9, 2010. Beach has a radio and internet ministry featuring weekly broadcasts of sermons and daily one-minute audio devotional teaching ministry, A Word from the Lord, which is dedicated to sharing "Biblical teaching using the instruments of radio, print, the Internet, and satellite technology so that people might discover the living Jesus for themselves and become more faithful followers of Jesus by hearing and applying the Word of God in their lives."

== Archbishop of the Anglican Church in North America ==
Beach was elected the second archbishop of the Anglican Church in North America after a three-day conclave held at the crypt of the Roman Catholic Basilica of St. Vincent Archabbey, in Latrobe, Pennsylvania. The contentious vote finally ended "unanimously" with all votes ultimately going to Beach after the multiple balloting that took place over the three-day conclave, on June 21, 2014. "Over the course of three days of intense conversation and sometimes vigorous fellowship [disagreement] and in the end we were all clear where we were headed and the person who could best lead us there was ... Foley Beach," said Archbishop Emeritus Robert Duncan following the election of Beach. He took office at the conclusion of the provincial assembly of the Anglican Church in North America on June 25, 2014. His investiture took place at the Church of the Apostles in Atlanta, Georgia, on October 9, 2014, with an attendance of 2,000 people and seven Anglican archbishops who afterwards recognized him as a fellow primate and archbishop of the Anglican Communion. However, according to the traditional instruments of communion and the Archbishop of Canterbury, the Anglican Church in North America is not a member of the Anglican Communion. This has been an intentional choice of the bishops because of the non-Biblical drift of the leadership of the Anglican Communion. Beach was able to finalize the efforts to have the Church of England recognize the Orders of the Anglican Church of America as valid in 2017.

Beach subscribes to the right of each diocese to their own decision on the ordination of women. He was keen in following Robert Duncan's main prerogatives, including social engagement, church planting, ecumenism and full integration into the Anglican Communion, with the support of the Fellowship of Confessing Anglicans and the Global South. He initiated the Matthew 25 Initiative Matthew 25 Initiative encouraging congregations to minister to the least, the last, and the lost in their local communities.

Shortly after his investiture, Beach held an eighteen-day journey that took him to the Church of the Province of South East Asia, the Church of the Province of Myanmar and the Anglican Diocese of Sydney, from November 11–29, 2014. The main purpose of the journey was to strengthen the ties between the Anglican Church in North America and these three Anglican realignment churches. He first visited the Church of the Province of South East Asia, from November 11–14, 2014, where he took part with a 37-member delegation of the Anglican Church in North America at a mission consultations roundtable held at St. Andrew's Cathedral in Singapore, also meeting Archbishop Bolly Lapok and visiting both Singapore and Malaysia. He followed this with a visit to the Church of the Province of Myanmar, where he was welcomed by Archbishop Stephen Than Myint Oo, and to the Anglican Diocese of Sydney, meeting Archbishop Glenn Davies, who invited him to preach at St. Andrew's Cathedral in Sydney.

During a meeting of the Anglican Primates of the Global South, a coalition representing the majority of the world's Anglicans, from October 14–16, 2015, in Cairo, Egypt, Beach was seated as a member of the Global South Primates Council with voice and vote, and he will continue to have voice and vote in future meetings. This follows his seating on the Gafcon Primates Council with primates representing the vast majority of the Anglican Communion. In December 2015 at the invitation of Archbishop Onesipore Rwaje, Beach preached at the Anglican Church of Rwanda’s Bishops and Clergy Conference. Beach was invited by the Archbishop of Canterbury, Justin Welby, to the Anglican Communion primates' gathering that took place on January 11–15, 2016.

In July 2016 Beach participated in the Enthronement of Jackson Ole Sapit as the new Archbishop and Primate of Kenya at All Saints Cathedral in Nairobi. In November 2016 Beach visited the Province of South East Asia, preaching the Diocese of Singapore and ministering in Kathmandu, Nepal. Representing the Gafcon Primates Council, he announced on the same day that the Scottish Episcopal Church voted to approve same-sex marriage, on June 8, 2017, that the Rev. Canon Andy Lines would be consecrated Missionary Bishop to Europe and Scotland by the Gafcon Primates at the Anglican Church in North America's Third Provincial Assembly, in Wheaton, Illinois, taking place on June 30, 2017, on behalf of the Global Anglican Future Conference. In May 2018 Beach represented the Gafcon Primates Council by installing Miguel Uchôa as the first Archbishop of the Anglican Province of Brazil. In January 2018, Beach was invited to speak to the bishops of South Sudan at the election of their new Archbishop and Primate, Justin Badi Arama.

At the conclusion of GAFCON III, in June 2018 in Jerusalem, it was announced that Beach would succeed Nicholas Okoh, Primate of the Church of Nigeria, as chair of the Global Anglican Future Conference's primates council. Beach served as Chairman until 2023 when Archbishop Laurent Mbanda, Archbishop and Primate of Rwanda was elected. In August 2018 Beach participated in a preaching mission to Tanzania at the invitation of Bishop Stanley Hotay.

Beach visited England, Wales and Scotland, on October 24–31, 2018, where he was accompanied by Bishop Andy Lines of the Anglican Mission in England. He preached at several Anglican churches to express his full support for the Anglican realignment in Great Britain and Ireland. He also met Christopher Cocksworth, Bishop of Coventry, responsible for the Church of England project "Living in Love & Faith". In January 2019 Beach was invited to participate in the consecration of the a new bishop for Kushtia, Bangladesh, Heman Halderin, in Rajshahi. In October 2019, at the invitation of Archbishop and Primate of the Indian Ocean, James Wong, Beach preached to bishops and clergy in Seychelles; and in October 2019, representing the Gafcon primates, he was the chief consecrator of Jay Behan as the first bishop of the Church of Confessing Anglicans Aotearoa/New Zealand.

== Ecumenical and inter-faith dialogue ==
The Anglican Church in North America has had ecumenical talks with various denominations including the Missouri Synod Lutheran Church, the North American Lutheran Church, the Orthodox Church in America, the Roman Catholic Church, the Evangelical Lutheran Church of Latvia, the Presbyterian Church in America, World Methodist Fellowship, and the Good Shepherd Church of India. Beach led a delegation in August 2015 for Ecumenical discussions with Patriarch Kirill and the Russian Orthodox Church. Beach signed Full Communion Concordances with the Free Church of England in 2015, the Episcopal Missionary Church in 2020, the Evangelical Lutheran Church of Latvia in 2023, and the Filipino Independent Catholic Church in 2024. In 2023 Beach led a delegation to the Vatican with discussions with the Roman Catholic Church regarding resurrecting the Malta Statement from the 1960s regarding steps for Eucharistic Fellowship.

He visited Pakistan in November 2019, at the invitation of the Kul Masalak Ulama Board Leadership, where he met Moderator Humphrey Peters and Bishop Azad Marshall, of the Church of Pakistan. He also was present in an interfaith gathering with Muslim scholars in Lahore on 19 November 2019. In February 2020 Beach was invited by Ugandan Archbishop and Primate Stephen Kaziimba to preach at his enthronement and lead his personal pre-enthronement spiritual retreat in Kampala. In March 2020 Beach was invited by Archbishop and Primate Ezekiel Kondo to Khartoum to a preaching mission and ministry to the Sudanese bishops. In September 2021 at the invitation of Archbishop and Primate Henry Ndukuba of Nigeria, Beach preached and ministered at the Standing Committee of the Church of Nigeria in Lagos, Nigeria. In June 2023 Beach was invited to preach to the nation at the annual Uganda Martyr’s Day Remembrance in Kampala. In October 2023 Beach ministered in North India in the Anglican Diocese of Bengal at the invitation of Bishop Probal Dutta.

== Succession ==
Beach was succeeded as archbishop by Steve Wood in June 2024.

== Personal life ==
He is married to Allison and they have two adult children.

Religious titles
New title	Bishop of the South; 2010–present	Incumbent
Preceded by Robert Duncan	Archbishop of the Anglican Church in North America; 2014–2024	Succeeded by Steve Wood
Preceded by Nicholas Okoh	Chairman of Global Fellowship of Confessing Anglicans; 2019–2023	Succeeded by Laurent Mbanda
