= Anglican Diocese of the South =

Anglican diocese in the southeastern United States

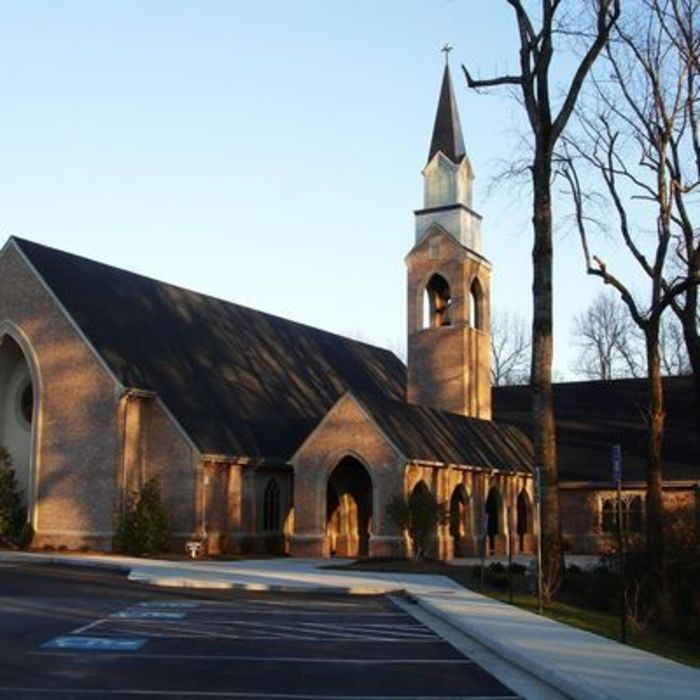
- The diocesan cathedral in Loganville, Georgia

Location
- Ecclesiastical province: Anglican Church in North America

Statistics
- Parishes: 55 (2025)
- Members: 6,961 (2025)

Information
- Rite: Anglican
- Cathedral: Holy Cross Cathedral, Loganville

Current leadership
- Diocesan bishop: The Most Rev. Foley Beach
- Assistant bishop: The Rt. Rev. Dr. Frank Lyons

Website
- adots.org

The Anglican Diocese of the South is a diocese of the Anglican Church in North America, encompassing 50 parishes in the American states of Alabama, Arkansas, Georgia, Kentucky, Mississippi, Missouri, North Carolina, Tennessee and West Virginia, as well as Christ Church Plano, the provincial pro-cathedral under the oversight of Bishop of the South Foley Beach in his capacity as ACNA archbishop. The state with most parishes is Georgia, with 23. The diocesan headquarters are located in Atlanta, Georgia. Holy Cross Cathedral in Loganville, Georgia, serves as the cathedral.

== History ==
The Anglican Diocese of the South was created on June 9, 2010 as a new diocese of the Anglican Church in North America. Its first bishop is Foley Beach, consecrated on October 9, 2010, at the Church of the Apostles, in Atlanta, Georgia, by Archbishop Robert Duncan. Beach has been Rector and Pastor of the Holy Cross Anglican Church, in Loganville, since 2004.

On April 18, 2012, the Anglican Diocese of the South announced the temporary affiliation of T. J. Johnston, of the Anglican Mission in the Americas, as Assisting Bishop, a measure to "provide a temporary jurisdictional connection" at least for 180 days until the future of the AMiA clergy and parishes is clarified.

On June 21, 2014, Beach was elected the second Archbishop of the Anglican Church in North America, with his enthronement taking place on 9 October 2014. He remained as bishop of the Anglican Diocese of the South. Archbishop Beach called the Right Reverend Dr. Francis Lyons III as assisting bishop since 2014.

In 2026, 14 parishes in the western area of the diocese—Arkansas, Missouri, Mississippi and West Tennessee—applied to the ACNA to be recognized as a new diocese. The ACNA's Provincial Council approved the new diocese, to be called the Anglican Diocese of the Mid-South, at its June 2026 meeting. The congregations will remain part of the Diocese of the South until the new diocese elects its first bishop in 2027.

== Parishes ==
In 2025, the Diocese of the South reported 55 congregations (up 10% from 2022) with 6,961 members (down 7% from 2022) and 6,356 in average Sunday attendance (up 13% from 2022). Notable parishes in the Diocese of the South include:

Church	Image	City	Year founded	Year completed	Notes
St. Mark's Anglican Church		Moultrie, Georgia	1912	1923	
Holy Cross Cathedral		Loganville, Georgia	2004	2005	Diocesan cathedral
