= Frank Lyons =

21st-century Anglican bishop

The Right Reverend Frank Lyons
- Assistant Bishop
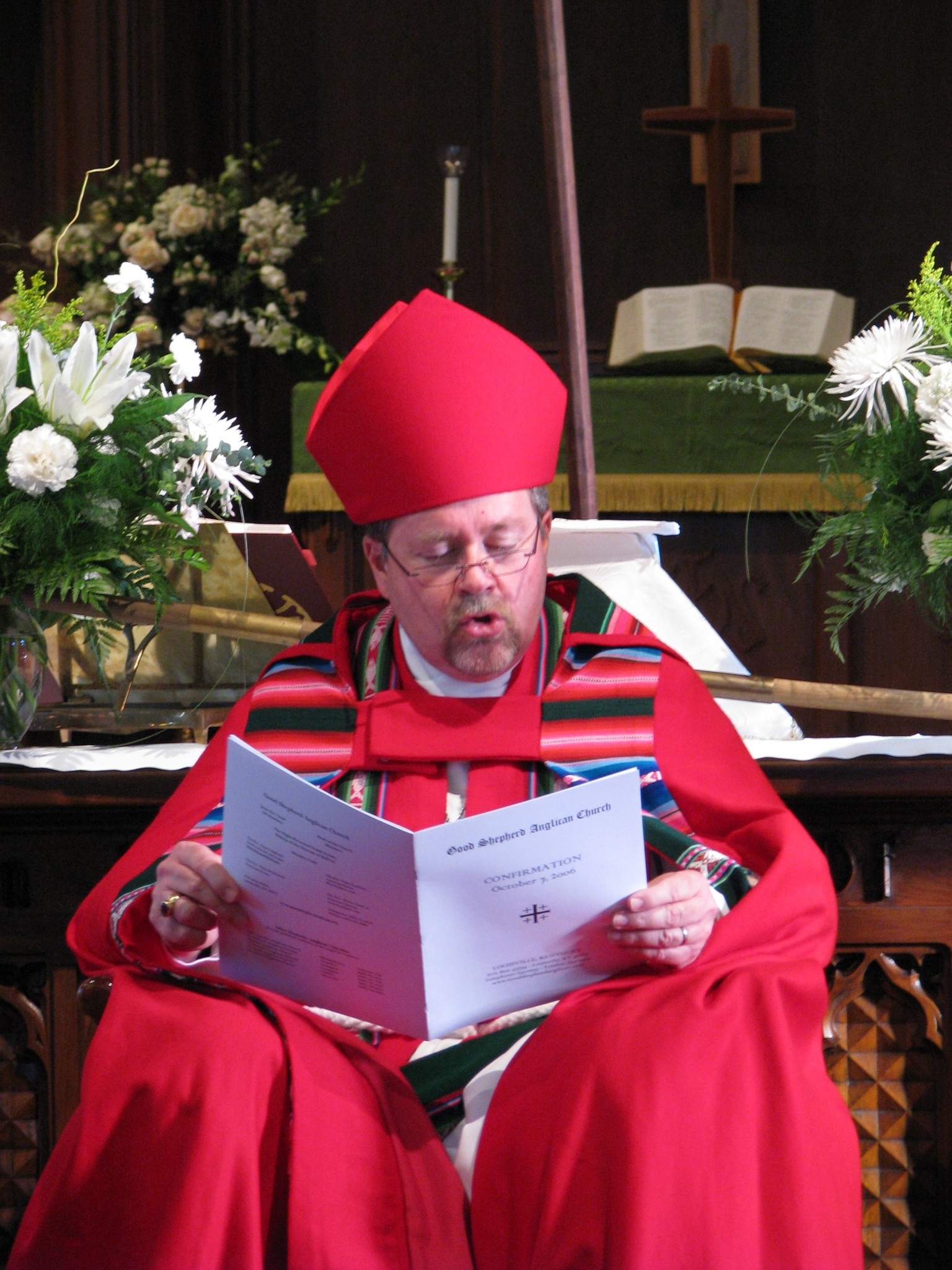
- Church: Anglican Church in North America
- Diocese: Anglican Diocese of the South
- Other post: Anglican Bishop of Bolivia

Orders
- Ordination: 1980
- Consecration: 2001

Personal details
- Born: 1954 (age 71–72)

Francis "Frank" Raymond Lyons III (born 1954) is an American-born Anglican bishop who has been a missionary in South America. From 2001 to 2012, he was bishop of Bolivia. In 2012, he was appointed assistant bishop in the Anglican Diocese of Pittsburgh. In January 2015, he became assisting bishop in the Anglican Diocese of the South.

== Early life, education, and career ==
Lyons was born in Maryland and raised in an Episcopal parish near Potomac, Maryland. At 17, he discerned a calling to serve as a bishop, based on 1 Timothy 3:1.

Lyons attended Wheaton College for both bachelor's and master's degrees. It was there that he met his future wife, Shawnee. He attended seminary at Nashotah House, and after graduation unsuccessfully sought ordination in the Episcopal Diocese of Washington. Why Lyons' pursuit of ordination there was refused is a matter of controversy. Lyons was ordained in 1980 in the Episcopal Church's extraprovincial jurisdiction in Ecuador, where he and his wife served as missionaries. They later served at churches in California, and then from 1993 to 2001 in Honduras. The Lyonses were supported by the Society of Anglican Missionaries and Senders.

== Episcopacy ==
In 2001, Lyons was elected bishop of the Diocese of Bolivia, one of seven dioceses in the Anglican Church of the Southern Cone of America (now called The Anglican Church of South America). The diocese was very small; at the time of his election, it included only four parishes. By 2012, that number had grown to eight.

Lyons became known in the United States for providing oversight to theologically conservative Episcopal parishes who wished to break away from the Episcopal Church after its consecration of Gene Robinson as a bishop in 2003. By 2007, he oversaw as many as 40 parishes and was an active participant in the Anglican Church of the Southern Cone's role in the Anglican realignment. These U.S. parishes were known as the "Northern Deanery" of the Diocese of Bolivia.

In August 2012, Lyons accepted an appointment as assistant bishop in the Anglican Diocese of Pittsburgh. He supported Robert Duncan in his dual roles as diocesan bishop of Pittsburgh and archbishop of the Anglican Church in North America. Lyons had a special assignment to oversee parishes outside of the Pittsburgh region.

In January 2015, Lyons became assisting bishop in the Anglican Diocese of the South. He assists Archbishop Foley Beach in providing episcopal pastoral care and leadership including confirmations and ordinations, and leading the deans, along with other areas of leadership and care within the diocese.

== Notes ==
Anglican Communion titles
Preceded by Gregory Venables	Bishop of Bolivia; 2001–2012	Succeeded by Raphael R. Samuel
