= St. Mark's Anglican Church (Moultrie, Georgia) =

Coordinates: 31.17303°N 83.78849°W

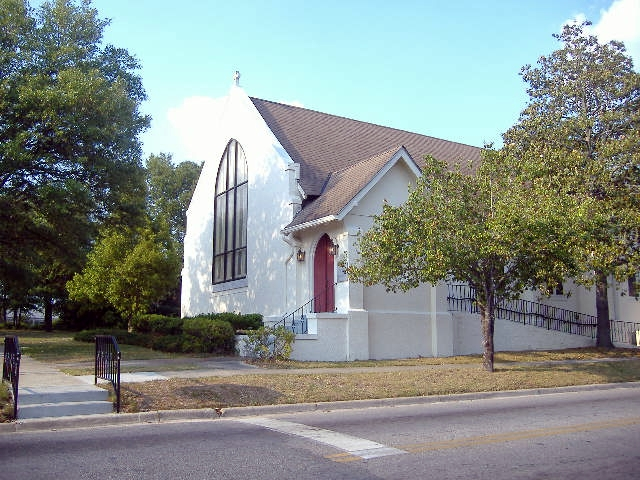
- St. Mark's Anglican Church
- Denomination: Anglican Church in North America
- Previous denomination: Episcopal Church
- Churchmanship: Anglo-Catholic
- Website: www.stmarksmoultrie.org

History
- Former name: St. John's Episcopal Church

Administration
- Diocese: South

Clergy
- Rector: The Rev. Canon Jay Thomas

St. Mark's Anglican Church is an Anglican church in Moultrie, Georgia, United States. Originally known as St. John's Episcopal Church in the Diocese of Georgia, it joined the Anglican Church in North America and the Anglican Diocese of the South during the Anglican realignment.

== History ==
The church dates to 1912, when an Episcopal priest in Fitzgerald began holding services in Moultrie. Services were held at a Presbyterian church and in private residences. In 1919, land was purchased to construct a building; ground was broken in 1922 and the church was dedicated in 1923.

In July 2012, the rector, Fr. Will McQueen, the vestry and the congregation left the historic church building and founded St. Mark's Anglican Church. They met temporarily in the chapel of Trinity Baptist Church. In late 2013, the congregation re-purchased the building from the Diocese of Georgia.

== Churchmanship ==
St. Mark's follows the Anglo-Catholic tradition of worship. It uses the 2019 Book of Common Prayer (ACNA) and 1940 Hymnal for all services.

== See also ==
- Anglican realignment
- Anglican Church in North America
- Anglican Diocese of the South
