= St Ninian's Church, Whitby =

Former church in Whitby, North Yorkshire, England

Church of St Ninian, Whitby
- New Chapel
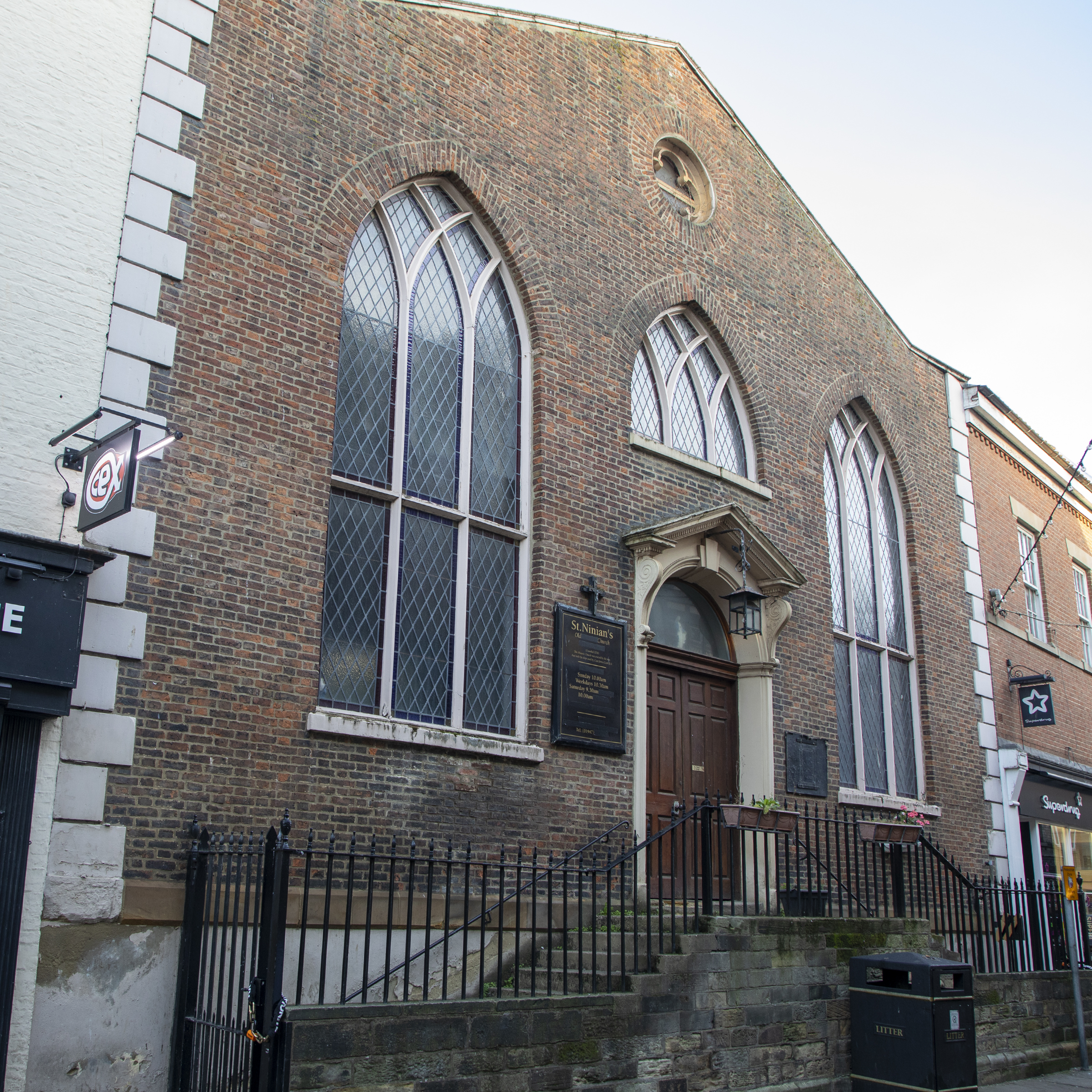
- Church of St. Ninian, Baxtergate
- Church of St Ninian, Whitby
- 54.486°N 0.615°W
- OS grid reference: NZ 89818 10964
- Location: Whitby, North Yorkshire
- Country: England
- Denomination: Non-denominational
- Previous denomination: Episcopal; Church of England; Anglican Catholic Church

History
- Dedication: St Ninian
- Dedicated: 1863

Architecture
- Functional status: Closed
- Years built: 1776-1778
- Completed: October 1778; 247 years ago
- Closed: 2019; 7 years ago

Specifications
- Capacity: 800 (1778); 600 (1882)

Listed Building – Grade II*
- Designated: 23 February 1954
- Reference no.: 1148349

The Church of St Ninian is a former place of worship in Whitby, North Yorkshire, England. The building was a proprietary chapel, the only one in the whole of Yorkshire, and one of only two Anglican churches to be dedicated to St Ninian in England. St Ninian's used to serve as an Anglican place of worship (as a chapel of ease to St Mary's Church, which is on the east cliff at Whitby). St Ninian's later became involved in the Anglican Catholic Church after a disagreement with the Church of England over the ordination of women priests. The church is noted for its interior woodwork, crafted by men who worked in the shipyards at Whitby noted for turning out the ships used by Captain Cook on his explorations looking for Terra Australis. The church was the second-oldest Anglican church in the town of Whitby, with more churches and chapels being built after St Ninian's.

The church ceased to be a functioning religious house in 2019.

== History ==
A chapel of ease called St Ninian's was known to have been in existence on Baxtergate in Whitby since the late 14th century. This was located quite near to the harbour walls near Horse-Mill Ghaut. (Note: A Ghaut is a localised term for a narrow alleyway leading down to the waters edge. It is believed to derive from the Scandinavian word gat meaning a way through. Whilst the word seems common in India, it is not used elsewhere in England.) This has led to some speculation of it being a Medieval bridge chapel. The current chapel, of late 18th century origin, was built on the opposite side of the road to the earlier Chapel, and as the altar does not face towards the east, the church was noted for not being orientated. It was originally opened as an Episcopal chapel and was sometimes known as Baxtergate Chapel, before later becoming St Ninians.

The 1778 church was built by local people and owned by them, not the Church of England. As such, it is known as a Proprietors Church, the only one in Yorkshire, and believed to be only one of four such churches in England. Thirty of the townsfolk paid £64 each towards the building costs, which entitled them to a free pew. The rest of the pews in the church were available to anyone, and their collection plate offerings paid for the minister's salary. As the church was free of the local diocese, the minister at that time was appointed by the patrons of the church. However, the minister was under licence from the Archbishop of York. Some of the original owners of the church included Thomas Fishburn and Thomas Milner; Fishburn's Yard in the town built three of the ships that Captain Cook used on his voyages, and Milner owned the Earl of Pembroke, which was bought by the Royal Navy and renamed Endeavour. As a result of this, the church always had a strong link to the seafarers in the town.

As the structure is a proprietary chapel, the families of those who paid for the church inherit the ownership, though by its closure, very few of the owners could be traced.

The inhabitants of lower Whitby were unhappy with having to travel up to St Mary's Church, which was on the hilltop of the East Cliff; one of the reasons cited for the building of St Nininan's was to alleviate that journey from the west bank of the river, up the 199 steps to the church. So they formed a shareholders fund to build their own church, and purchased a site on Baxtergate for £500, with the final cost of the entire church coming in at £2,000. They petitioned the Archbishop of York for an Anglican minister, and the rights given to a chapel of ease. The archbishop is said to have acceded as he was now free of having to build another church. The church was traditionally a chapel of ease to the Church of St Mary, on the east cliff at Whitby. In 1863, the church was dedicated to St Ninian; previous to this, it had been known as either Baxtergate Chapel (or less commonly as New Chapel.) It was only one of two Anglican churches in England to be dedicated to St Ninian. (Note: Another source states four in England, but one other is a Catholic church, and the former Church of St Ninian in Fenton was demolished by the end of the 19th century. Saint Ninian, as a dedication, exists in several churches elsewhere in the United Kingdom.)

Between 1881 and 1882, the church was extensively renovated with the box-pews removed in favour or ordinary pews, which reduced the number the church could host from 800 to 600. In the 1890s, the church was closed again for renovations, to a design drawn up by Edward H Smailes, who had the chancel and apse completely renovated. The upper galleries were not changed during this time, so whilst the lower floor has an Anglo-Catholic feel to its design, the galleries are the same now as they were when they were built in the 1770s. In 1892, three bells were acquired from Mears and Stainbank, though these have remained not been hung in a belfry.

In 1994, the church voted to leave the Church of England and join the Anglican Catholic Church over the ordination of women priests. It was the first church in Britain to leave the established Church of England structure "wholesale". In 1994, the Bishop of Whitby wrote to the Archbishop of York asking for the licence of St Ninian's to be revoked on account of the repairs needed to be made at the church. The problems of the decaying church could have led to falling masonry, and this would incur legal liability problems for the 30 owners of the church. However, only 15 members of the church could be located, and the approval status for church decisions needed a 51% majority or higher. The original 30 investors in the church passed on their rights through inheritance, sale, transfer, and in at least one instance, bankruptcy. Up until its secession from the Church of England, St Ninian's was the second oldest Anglican church in the town of Whitby (only the Church of St Mary is older), with the other churches in the town following in the 19th century.

In 1998, the Archbishop of York (David Hope) revoked the licence for the church to hold traditional Anglican services after the dispute with the "traditionalist members could not be resolved". Later, in 2013, the church announced its intent to breakaway from the Anglican Catholic Church and become independent, but in 2019, the church separated from the Anglican Catholic Church. It is now run by a supporters group who open it to visitors.

== Architecture ==
Completed in October 1778, the external walls are finished in brown brick, and the internal designs were akin to the wooden designs of the local ships. The cupboards in the vestry were fashioned to be like the locker's on ships, again a legacy of those who built the interior of the church in the first place. A Whitby mast-maker, Isaac Allanson, supplied the men and materials for the three galleries that line the church on three sides, with supports made from oak wood. The carpenters were used when the ship-building trade was "slack", or could be spared from the yard.

Supporting the roof is nearly 30,000 feet (9,100 m) of sawn timber. At that time, imports of timber were being hampered by a blockade caused by the American War of Independence. This increased the overall cost for all the proprietors. The roof is built from slate, which was transported overland from Hull in the 1770s. The land route was preferable to delivery by sea as shipping was affected by the war, which was ongoing at that time.

The Architect Journal from 1874 described the building as a "debased edifice of Queen Anne, or any way, of Dolly Varden architecture..."

The chancel screen, polygonal timber pulpit, and stone font, all originate from the early 20th century. In 1954, the building was grade II* listed.

== Notable people ==
- William Scoresby, attended the church when it had an evangelical preacher (Dr Richard Holloway) in charge. Scoresby later became a priest, inspired by Holloway.
- Ernest Stroud, was the incumbent vicar at St Ninian's in the early 1960s

== See also ==
- Grade II* listed buildings in North Yorkshire (district)
- Listed buildings in Whitby (central area - west)
- Ship and boat building in Whitby
