= Michael Youssef =

Egyptian-American pastor

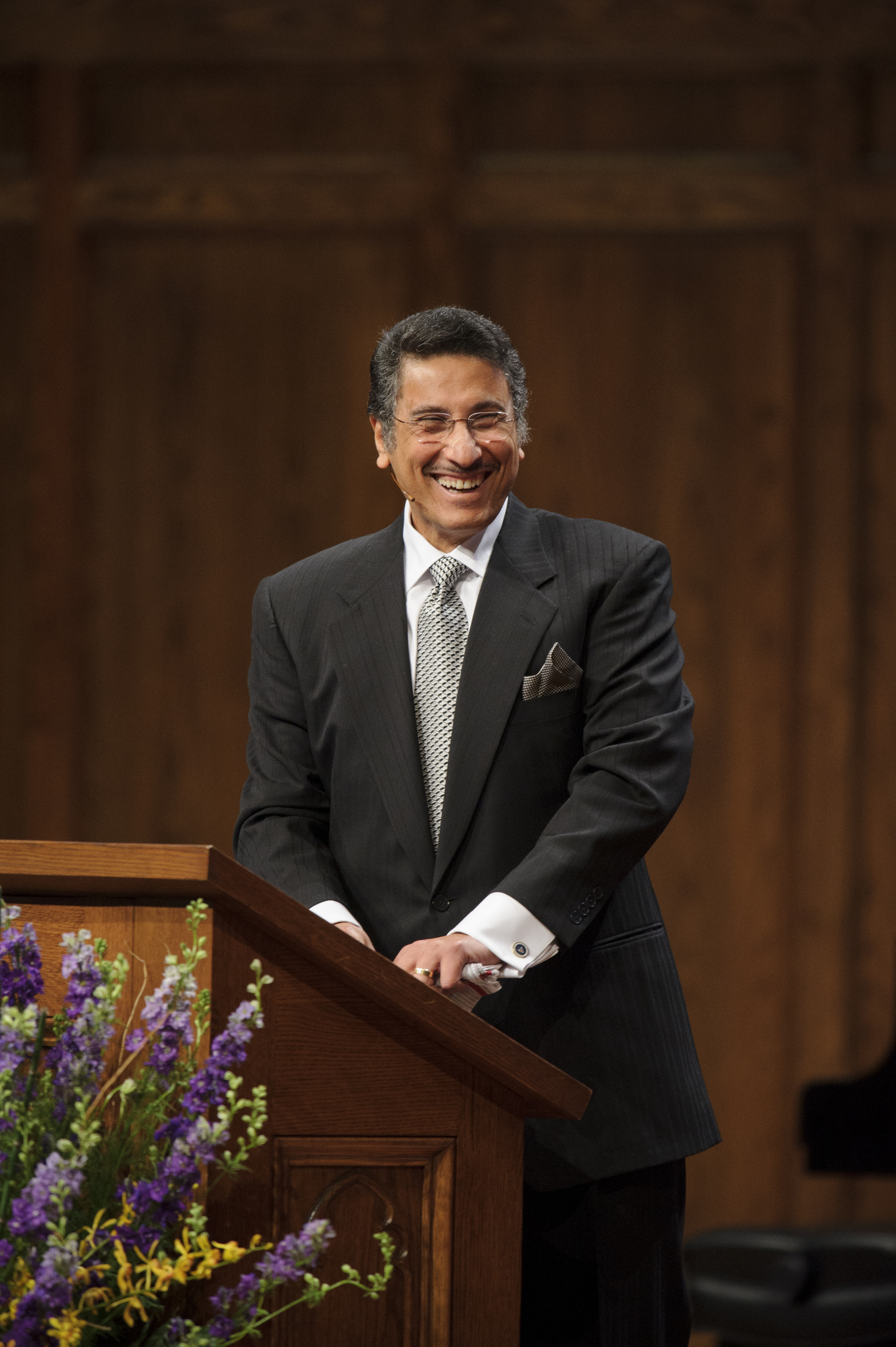
- Youssef preaching at the Church of the Apostles
- Born: September 25, 1948 (age 77); Egypt
- Education: Ph.D. in social anthropology from Emory University and degrees from Fuller Seminary and Moore Theological College.
- Occupation: Pastor
- Spouse: Elizabeth Youssef (m. 1971)
- Website: apostles.org

Michael Youssef (born September 25, 1948) is an Egyptian-American pastor. He is the founding rector and senior pastor of the Church of the Apostles in Atlanta, Georgia, and the executive president of Leading the Way.

== Life and career ==
Youssef was born in Egypt, where he became a Christian. The Six Day War in 1967 caused Youssef to flee Egypt with just a suitcase. He lived in Lebanon and Australia before moving to the United States. While in Australia, Youssef studied at Moore Theological College in Sydney, was ordained as a minister, and met his wife, Elizabeth.

The Youssefs immigrated to the United States in 1977, and in 1984 Youssef became a U.S. citizen. He earned additional degrees from Fuller Theological Seminary in California and Emory University in Georgia.

Youssef worked for nearly 10 years with the Haggai Institute, traveling around the world and teaching courses in evangelism and church leadership to church leaders. He founded the Church of the Apostles in 1987. He has authored more than 50 books, including The Barbarians Are Here, End Times and the Secret of the Mahdi, and Jesus, Jihad and Peace.

Youssef founded Leading The Way in 1988, a ministry in Atlanta, Georgia, with a focus on reaching Muslims in the Middle East. He is also the founding pastor of the Church of the Apostles in Atlanta.

Youssef and his wife live in Atlanta and have four grown children and eight grandchildren.

== Publications ==
- Fearless Living in Troubled Times: Finding Hope in the Promise of Christ's Return (2017)
- Life-Changing Prayers: How God Displays His Power to Ordinary People (2018)
- Saving Christianity? (2020)
- Is the End Near?: What Jesus Told Us About the Last Days (2022)
- How to Read the Bible: As If Your Life Depends on It (2023)
- Heaven Awaits (2024)
- God's Final Call (2025)
