= Raphael R. Samuel =

21st-century Anglican bishop

Raphael Samuel (born 16 January 1957) is a Singaporean former Anglican Bishop of Bolivia. He is the first Asian bishop in the Spanish speaking world.

== Early life and education ==
Samuel studied at the Anglo-Chinese Schools. In 1974, he joined the Republic of Singapore Navy and left in 1980 to study at Trinity Theological College for four years.

== Ecclesiastical career ==
In 1993, Samuel went to Bolivia as a missionary.

In August 2012, Frank Lyons, Bishop of Bolivia, accepted an appointment as assistant bishop in the Anglican Diocese of Pittsburgh and left Bolivia after 11 years in Bolivia. A local was initially considered for the position but he withdrew from the position. Samuel was then elected as Bishop,

In 2013, Samuel was consecrated bishop of the Diocese of Bolivia, one of seven dioceses in the Anglican Church of the Southern Cone of America (now called The Anglican Church of South America).

== Personal life ==
Samuel is married to Michelle Lee who he met while studying at Trinity Theological College. They have one son.
