= St James' Church, Ryde =

Coordinates: 50°43′46″N 01°09′50″W

St. James's Church, Ryde
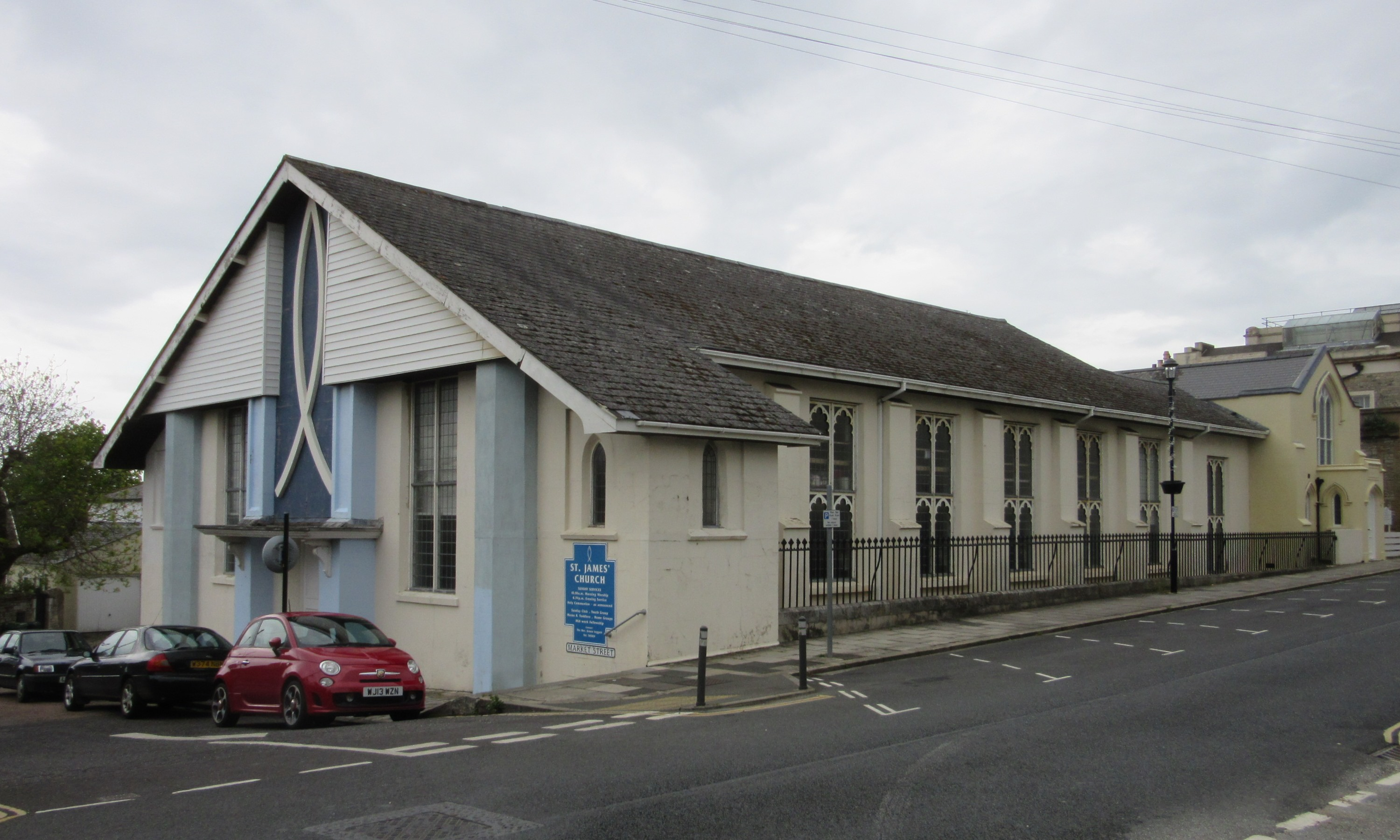
- St. James's Church, Ryde
- Denomination: Anglican Mission in England
- Churchmanship: Conservative Evangelical
- Website: Church website

History
- Dedication: St. James

St. James's Church, Ryde is a proprietary chapel located in Ryde, Isle of Wight. Until 2020 it was part of the Church of England, when it left to join the Anglican Mission in England.

== History ==
The church was built in 1827 on Lind Street, as only the second Church of England building in Ryde. It was commissioned by W. Hughes, with his brother Revd. Augustus Hewitt serving as the inaugural minister. Both brothers left in 1830, with Hughes being elected to Parliament as M.P. for Oxford. Revd. Richard Waldo Sibthorp, a Fellow of Magdalen College, Oxford, purchased the chapel and ministered to its congregation until 1841. From then, it was passed on several times, before in 1903 it was transferred to a group of five trustees, which holds it to this day. Since 1904 it has been part of the Church Society group of churches.

=== Organ ===
The organ was built in 1911 by James Ivemey of Southampton. It was later replaced by an organ originally in a Methodist church on St. Peter's Street in Winchester. One of the few recorded organists was a certain 'Miss Watts' around 1921. A specification of the organ can be found on the National Pipe Organ Register.

== Present Day ==
St James' Church continues to be highly active with services at 10:30am and 6:30pm each Sunday, as well as a range of youth groups and mid-week groups.

It is within the Conservative Evangelical tradition of the Church of England and before it left that church had passed resolutions to reject the ordination of women.
