= William Harness =

English cleric and man of letters

William Harness (1790–1869) was an English cleric and man of letters.

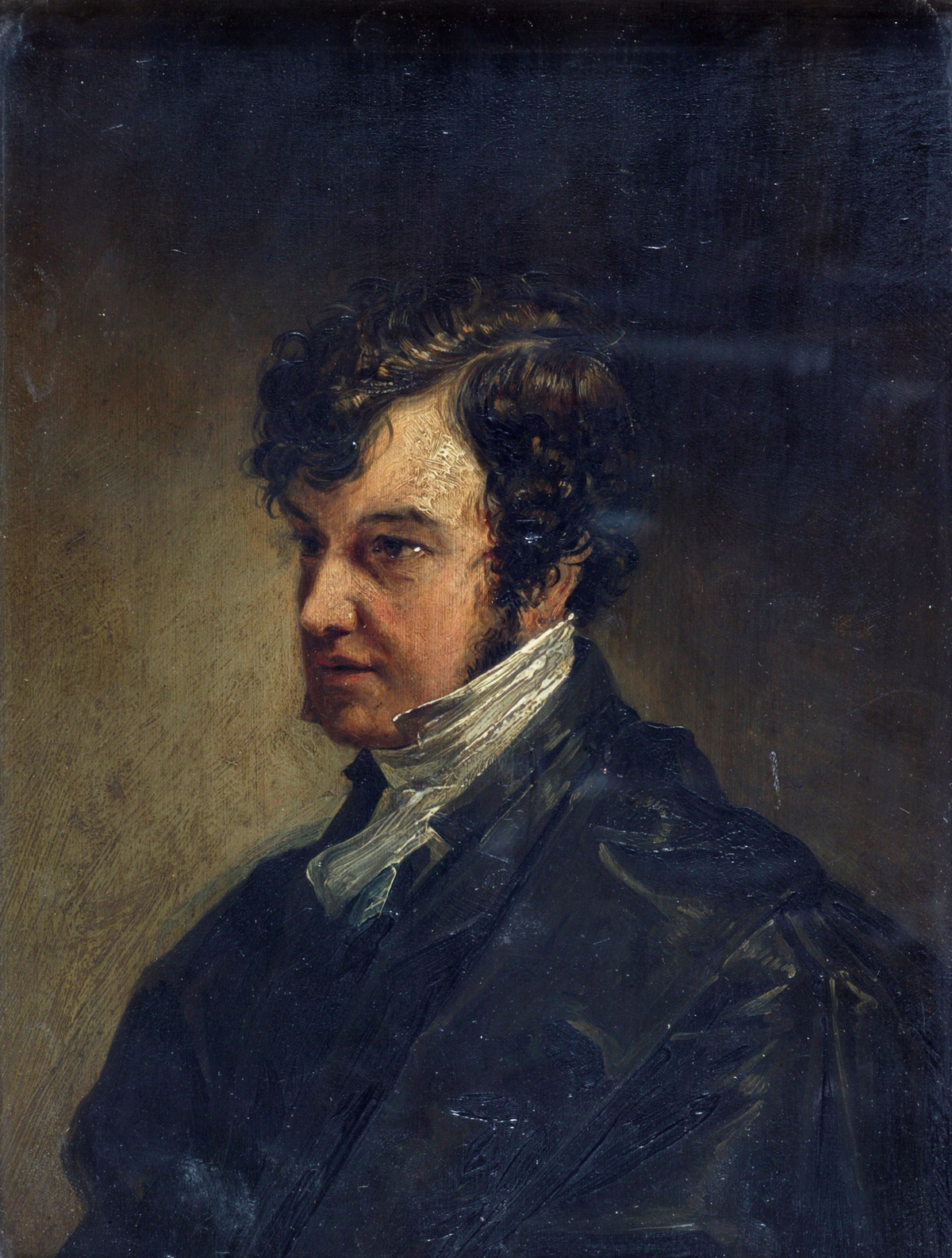
William Harness, portrait from the 1820s by George Lance

== Life ==
Born near Wickham in Hampshire on 14 March 1790, he was son of John Harness, M.D., commissioner of transports, and elder brother Henry Drury Harness. In 1796 he went to Lisbon with his father, and in 1802 entered Harrow School. There he knew Lord Byron, with whom he had a physical disability of the leg in common. He went on to Christ's College, Cambridge, where he graduated B.A. 1812, M.A. 1816.

Some letters from Byron to Harness survive from two short periods between February and June 1808, and then in December 1811. All Byron's letters seek to re-establish a recalled Harrow friendship and latterly became increasingly intimate in tone. Harness spent part of Christmas 1811 with Byron and another friend, Francis Hodgson, at Newstead Abbey but the friendship cooled so much immediately after, that there is no correspondence at all. The following month, Byron declared to his friend John Cam Hobhouse that "Hodgson was with me...& a Mr Harness of Harrow a mighty friend of mine, but I am sick of Harrow things".

Harness took holy orders, and was ordained curate of Kilmeston, Hampshire, in 1812. He was curate of Dorking 1814-16, and then preacher at Trinity Chapel, Conduit Street, London, and minister and evening lecturer at St. Anne's, Soho. At Hampstead he was curate from 1823 to 1826, and then, owing to his popularity as a preacher, became incumbent of St Peter's Church, Regent Square in London, from 1826 to 1844. On the opposite side of Regent Square, Edward Irving's chapel was situated, and in 1831 Harness preached a pointed sermon entitled Modern Claims to Miraculous Gifts of the Spirit. On visiting Stratford-on-Avon, and finding the inscription on Shakespeare's monument in a poor state, he had it restored.

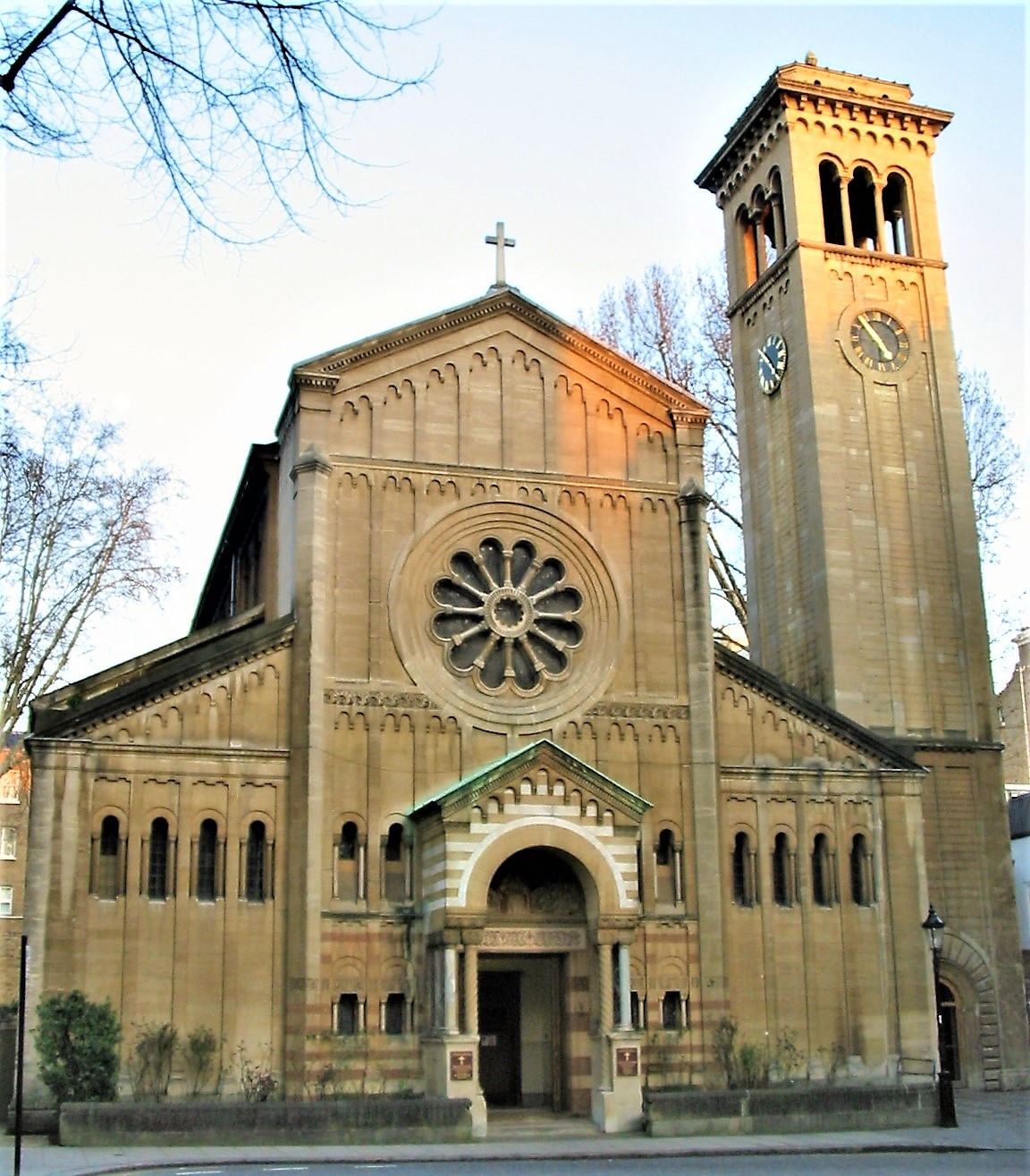
All Saints, Knightsbridge (1849), from 1955 a Russian Orthodox cathedral

In 1841 Lord Lansdowne appointed Harness clerical registrar of the privy council. From 1844 to 1847 he was minister of Brompton Chapel, London. During this period, at the suggestion of Henry Milman, he undertook to build the church of All Saints, Knightsbridge, raising money and contributing himself. The church was opened in 1849, and he became the perpetual curate for the rest of his life.

On 1 March 1851 Harness acted as one of the stewards at the farewell dinner given to William Charles Macready In 1866 he was appointed Rugmere prebendary in St Paul's Cathedral, and preached there.

While on a visit to one of his former curates, Edward Neville Crake, dean of Battle, Harness died in a fall down the stone staircase of the deanery, on 11 November 1869. He was buried at Bath, Somerset. A brass tablet was erected to his memory in All Saints' Church, Knightsbridge, and a prize with his name was founded by the subscriptions of his friends at Cambridge for the study of Shakespearean literature. His close friends included Sarah Siddons, Fanny Kemble, Mr. and Mrs. Charles Kean, Robert Southey, William Wordsworth, Miss Mitford, Catherine Maria Fanshawe, Joanna Baillie, Harriet Martineau, and Thomas Hope. The Rev. A. G. L'Estrange wrote The Literary Life of the Rev. William Harness (1871).

== Works ==
Harness's writings, besides sermons, were:

- The Wrath of Cain. A Boyle Lecture, 1822.
- The Connexion of Christianity with Human Happiness, from the Boyle Lectures, 1823, 2 vols.
- The Life of W. Shakspeare, as vol. i. in The Dramatic Works of Shakspeare, edited by W. Harness, 1825, 8 vols.
- The Plays of P. Massinger adapted for family reading, edited by W. H., 1830.
- The Dramatic Works of J. Ford, edited by W. H., 1831.
- Welcome and Farewell: a Drama by W. H., 1837.
- Parochial Sermons, 1837.
- Christian Education. Four Sermons, 1840.
- The Image of God in Man. Four Sermons preached before the University of Cambridge, 1841.
- The First-Born: a Drama by W. H., 1844.
- The Errors of the Roman Creed considered in Six Sermons, 1851.
- Christian Unity, a practicable Christian Duty, 1852.
- The Life of Mary Russell Mitford, 1870. Completed amid much opposition.
- The Literary Remains of C. M. Fanshawe, 1876.

Harness wrote charades for his friends; three of these were inserted by Miss Mitford in Blackwood's Magazine in 1826; there in 1827 he contributed a tale entitled Reverses, which had a success. His writings in the Quarterly Review were considered to carry weight. In 1844, as "Presbyter Catholicus", he wrote a pamphlet Visiting Societies and Lay Readers. A Letter to the Lord Bishop of London, against Bishop Charles Blomfield's proposal for a metropolitan visiting and relief association.

== Notes ==
Attribution

This article incorporates text from a publication now in the public domain: Stephen, Leslie; Lee, Sidney, eds. (1890). "Harness, William". Dictionary of National Biography. Vol. 24. London: Smith, Elder & Co.
