= David Samuels =

David Samuels may refer to:

- David Samuels (political scientist), political science professor
- David Samuels (writer) (born 1967), American author
- Dave Samuels (1948–2019), American musician

== See also ==
- David Samuel (disambiguation)
