= Merrywood Grammar School =

Former school in Bristol, England

Coordinates: 51.4296°N 2.5809°W

Information
- Established: 1937
- Closed: 1995

Merrywood Grammar School was a grammar school in Knowle, Bristol. It opened in 1937 and closed in 1995. Its site now houses Knowle West Health Park.
