= David Samuel (bishop) =

David Norman Samuel (born 1930) is a retired English Continuing Anglican bishop. He was the first Presiding Bishop of the Church of England (Continuing), from 1995 to 2001. This Christian denomination was founded on 10 February 1994.

Samuel was originally ordained a deacon in the Church of England in 1961 and a priest the following year. On 11 June 1995 he was consecrated as a bishop by Albion W. Knight, Jr., a former Presiding Bishop of the United Episcopal Church of North America. On 13 September 1998, Samuel consecrated Edward Malcolm as assistant bishop of the denomination. Malcolm then succeeded Samuel in 2001, becoming the second presiding bishop of the church. On 23 November 2013, Samuel also consecrated Edward J. Malcolm as the third presiding bishop.

Samuel has opposed moves toward reunification between the Roman Catholic and Anglican churches.

Samuel is President of the Protestant Reformation Society and of the Protestant Truth Society.

He is the author of Pope or Gospel? (1982), Mirror to the Nation (1999), The Church in Crisis (2004) and Without Excuse - A Vindication of the Argument from Design (2004).

Religious titles
New title	Presiding Bishop of the Church of England (Continuing); 1995–2001	Succeeded by Edward Malcolm
