= Andy Lines =

British Anglican bishop (born 1960)

The Right Reverend Andy Lines
- Presiding Bishop
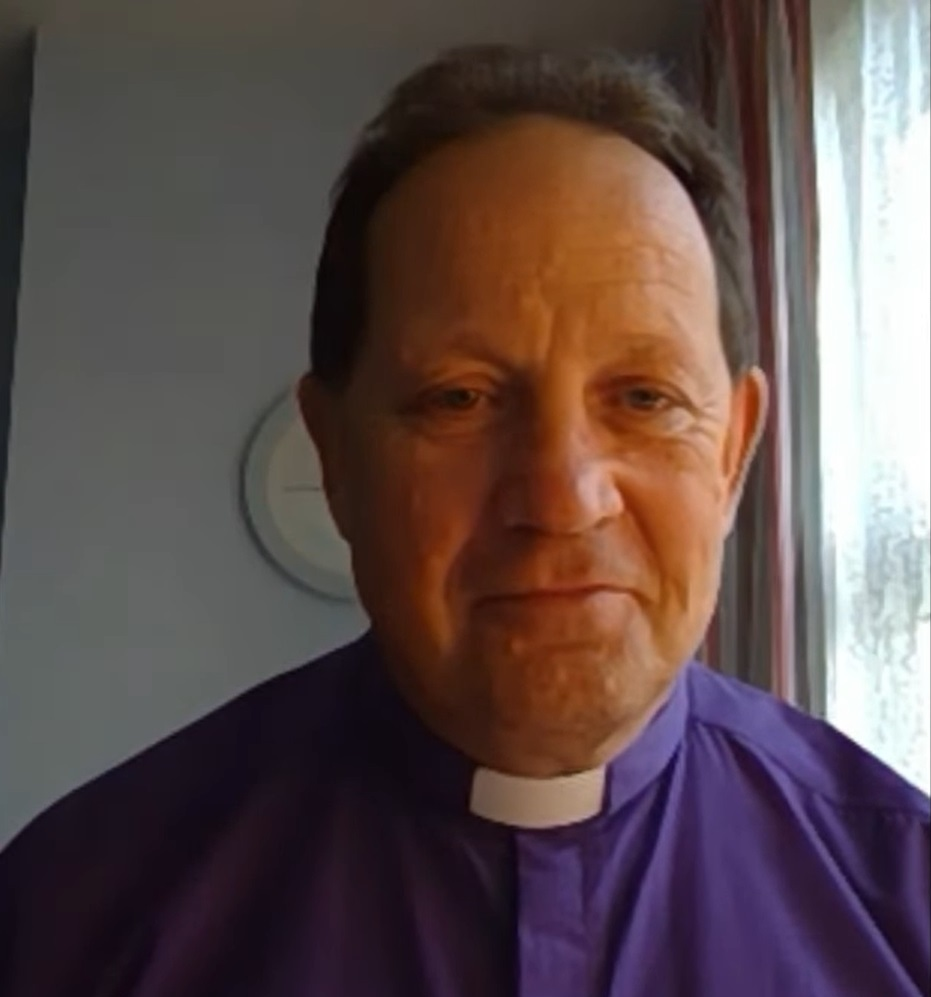
- Lines interviewed on Anglican Unscripted in 2020
- Church: Anglican Network in Europe
- Diocese: Anglican Mission in England, Anglican Convocation Europe

Orders
- Ordination: 1997 (deacon); 1998 (priest)
- Consecration: 30 June 2017 by Foley Beach

Personal details
- Born: 1960 (age 65–66)
- Denomination: Anglicanism
- Education: University College, Durham; Royal Military Academy Sandhurst; All Nations Christian College
- Military career
- Allegiance: United Kingdom
- Branch: British Army
- Service years: 1979–1988
- Rank: Captain
- Service number: 509184
- Unit: 2nd Royal Tank Regiment

Andrew John Lines (born 1960) is a British Anglican bishop. Since June 2017, he has been the Missionary Bishop to Europe of the Anglican Church in North America (ACNA), a province outside the Anglican Communion. In 2020, he became the first presiding bishop of the Anglican Network in Europe, a "proto-province" recognized by the Global Fellowship of Confessing Anglicans. Since 2000, he has been Mission Director and CEO of Crosslinks. He is also the chairman of the executive committee of the Anglican Mission in England (AMiE), the missionary arm of GAFCON in England. In June 2017, it was announced that he would be made a bishop for ACNA and GAFCON; he was consecrated on 30 June 2017.

== Early life and education ==
Lines was born in 1960. He studied at University College, Durham, graduating with a Bachelor of Arts (BA) degree in 1982. He trained for ordained ministry at the All Nations Christian College in Ware, Hertfordshire.

=== Military service ===
Lines was sponsored through university by the British Army: he held an undergraduate cadetship from 1979 to 1982. On 31 August 1979, he was made a second lieutenant (on probation) (undergraduate cadetship). On 19 July 1982, he was made a second lieutenant (on probation). He then underwent officer training at the Royal Military Academy Sandhurst.

In May 1983, having completed his training, Lines' commission in the Royal Tank Regiment was confirmed. His rank and seniority were then adjusted: he was confirmed as a second lieutenant (backdated to 19 July 1982) and granted seniority in that rank from 1 August 1978; he was promoted to lieutenant (backdated to 19 July 1982) with seniority from 1 August 1980. He served in the 2nd Royal Tank Regiment, and was based in London. He was promoted to captain on 1 February 1985. He resigned his commission on 19 September 1988, thereby leaving the British Army.

== Ordained ministry ==
Lines was ordained for the South American Mission Society (SAMS) as a deacon in 1997 and as a priest in 1998. From 1991 to 1999, he was a missionary in Paraguay. He was made an honorary canon of the Diocese of Paraguay in 2000.

In October 2000, Lines was appointed General Secretary of Crosslinks and he returned to England. His title was later changed to Mission Director and chief executive officer (CEO). From 2001, he also held permission to officiate in the Diocese of Southwark of the Church of England. In addition, he is Chairman of the Anglican Mission in England, the missionary arm of GAFCON in England, and Chairman of the GAFCON UK Task Force.

On 5 June 2017, Lines was received into the Diocese of the South of the Anglican Church in North America (ACNA), an Anglican realignment ecclesiastical province that is outside of the Anglican Communion.

=== Episcopal ministry ===
On 8 June 2017, it was announced that Lines had been chosen as the Missionary Bishop to Europe of the Anglican Church in North America (ACNA). On 26 June 2017, he was officially elected a "Bishop for Special Mission" by the College of Bishops of ACNA. He was consecrated a bishop on 30 June 2017; the principal consecrator was Foley Beach, Archbishop of the ACNA, and he was assisted by GAFCON-linked bishops of the Anglican Communion. As Missionary Bishop, he provides oversight to those Anglican churches in Europe that exist outside of current Anglican structures (such as the Church of England, Scottish Episcopal Church and the Convocation of Episcopal Churches in Europe). One priest of the Scottish Episcopal Church stated that his consecration "offers new life for bereft orthodox Anglicans in Scotland".

On 24 November 2017 the congregation of Christ Church, Harris, a Scottish Episcopal church in the Western Isles, announced that they could no longer remain under the oversight of their local bishop, Kevin Pearson, Bishop of Argyll and the Isles, owing to his support of the SEC's approval of same-sex marriage. They would instead be receiving the episcopal ministry of Andy Lines.

==== Controversy ====
The creation of a missionary bishop by GAFCON and the ACNA has been regarded as controversial. In a June 2017 pastoral letter Justin Welby, the Archbishop of Canterbury and head of the Anglican Communion, stated the following:

The idea of a "missionary bishop" who was not a Church of England appointment, would be a cross-border intervention and, in the absence of a Royal Mandate, would carry no weight in the Church of England. Historically, there has been resistance to cross-border interventions and ordinations from the earliest years of the universal Church's existence. [...] I would also like to remind you of the 1988 Lambeth Conference resolution number 72 on episcopal responsibilities and diocesan boundaries. This resolution reaffirms the historical position of respect for diocesan boundaries and the authority of bishops within these boundaries. It also affirms that it is deemed inappropriate behaviour for any bishop or priest of this Communion to exercise episcopal or pastoral ministry within another diocese without first obtaining the permission and invitation of the ecclesial authority thereof.

Lines' consecration was welcomed by two bishops of the Church of England: Julian Henderson, the Bishop of Blackburn, and Keith Sinclair, the Bishop of Birkenhead.

=== Views ===
Lines holds a complementarian position on women's ministry and leadership. He has spoken out against homosexuality. On 3 September 2016, he described the appointment of Nicholas Chamberlain as Bishop of Grantham as "divisive" and stated that "Christian leaders are to be above reproach"; Chamberlain had revealed that he was in a celibate homosexual relationship on 2 September 2016, almost a year after his consecration.

== Personal life ==
Lines is married to Mandy. Together they have three children: a son and two daughters.
