= St Mary's Church, Castle Street, Reading =

St Mary's Church, Castle Street
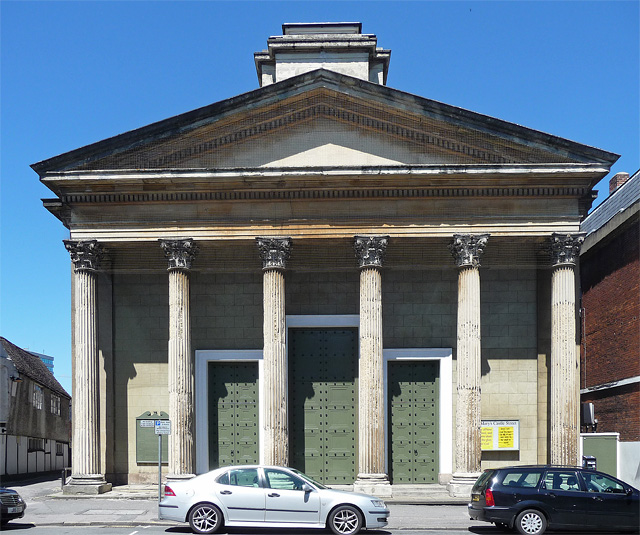
- St Mary's Church, Castle Street

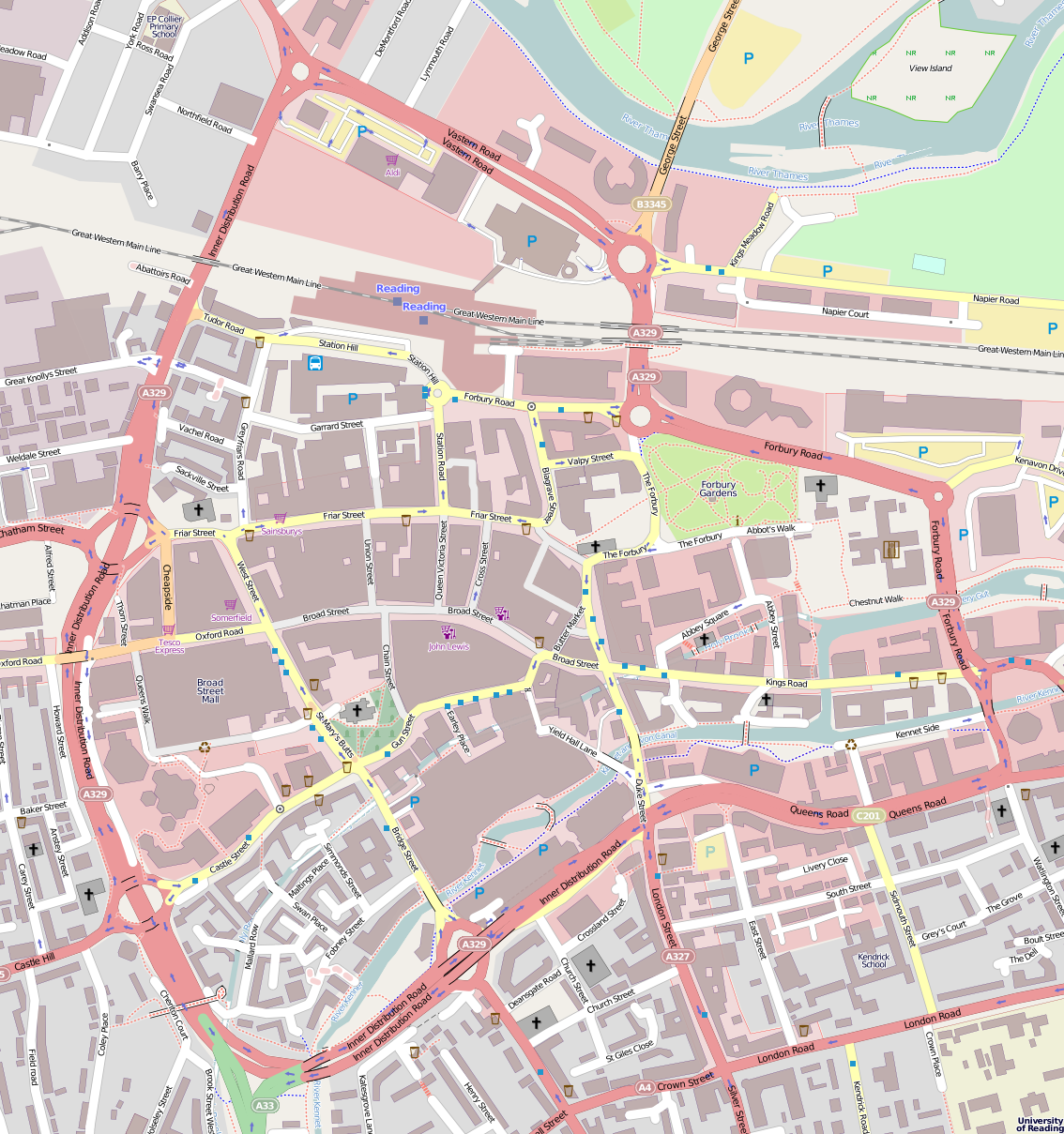
- Location within Reading Town Centre
- 51°27′13.59″N 0°58′29.32″W
- Location: Reading
- Country: England
- Denomination: Church of England (Continuing)

History
- Founded: 1798
- Dedication: none

Architecture
- Functional status: Active
- Heritage designation: Grade II*
- Architects: Richard Billing; Henry and Nathaniel Briant (portico)
- Style: Corinthian

Administration
- Diocese: N/A
- Archdeaconry: N/A

St Mary's Church, Castle Street is an independent church within the Continuing Anglican movement. It is located in the town centre of Reading, in the English county of Berkshire, and is a few yards from the similarly named, but much older Minster Church of St Mary the Virgin.

In 1798, there was a disagreement between the Bishop and the congregation of St Giles' Church in nearby Southampton Street. Many of the congregation left and founded a new chapel in Castle Street, on the site of Reading's old gaol. This chapel eventually became the Church of St Mary, Castle Street.

The church is a Grade II* listed building. The original 1798 building by Richard Billing was a simple Georgian building, but in 1840 the present hexastyle portico in Corinthian style was added by local brothers Henry and Nathaniel Briant. The frontage is rendered in stucco while the capitals of the portico are probably formed of Coade stone.

The church has a late-18th-century gallery in five bays with marbled Doric ground floor and Ionic gallery columns. There is a modillion cornice to the coved central ceiling and a small projecting chancel with a bay for the mid-19th-century organ. The instrument, by Vowles of Bristol, is dated 1870, and was moved to St Mary's from Bristol in 1987. The church used to be lit by two mid-19th-century cast iron chandeliers.

Today the church forms part of the Church of England (Continuing), a small group of four congregations outside the Church of England, self-identified on their website as "evangelical, reformed, Anglican".

== Gallery ==
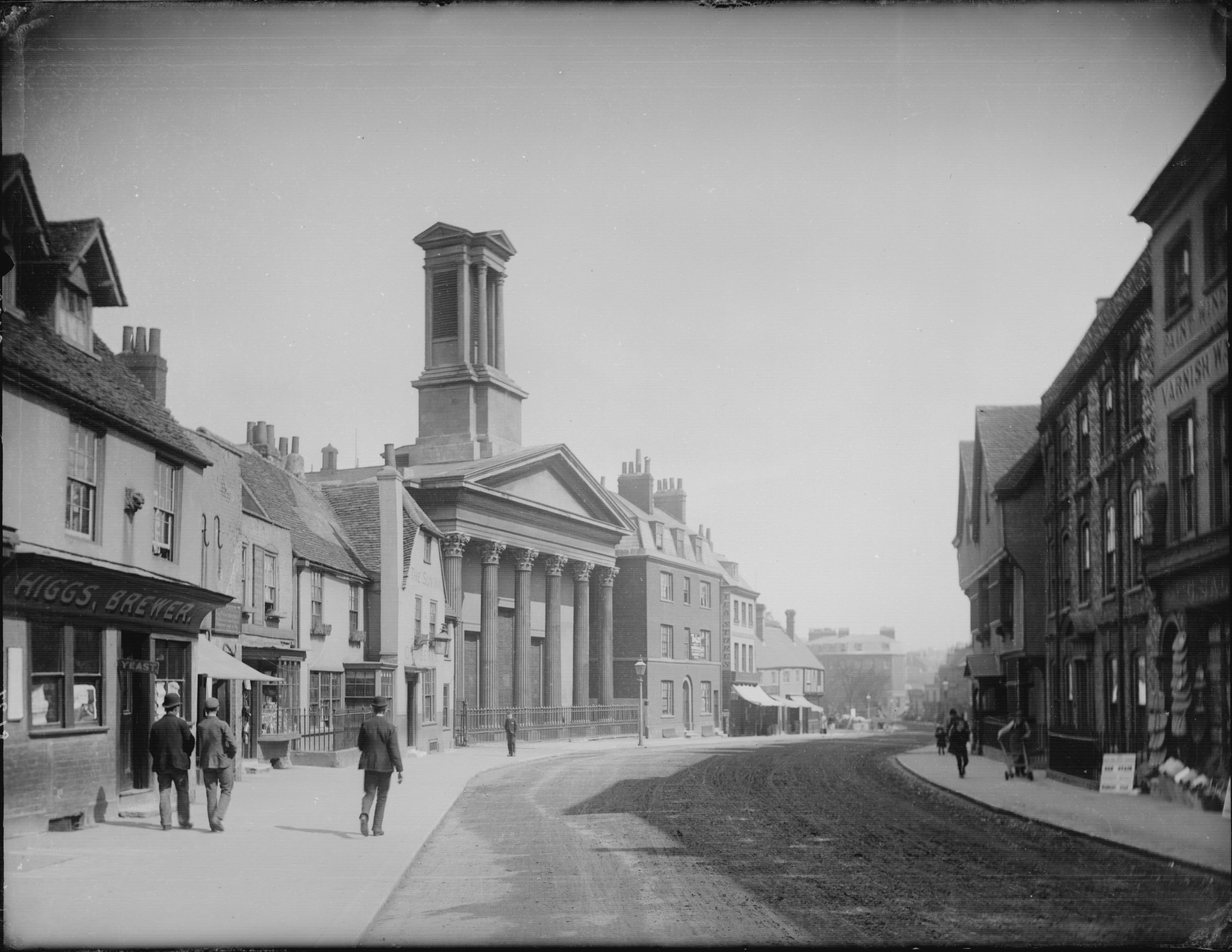
The church in 1890 by Henry Taunt

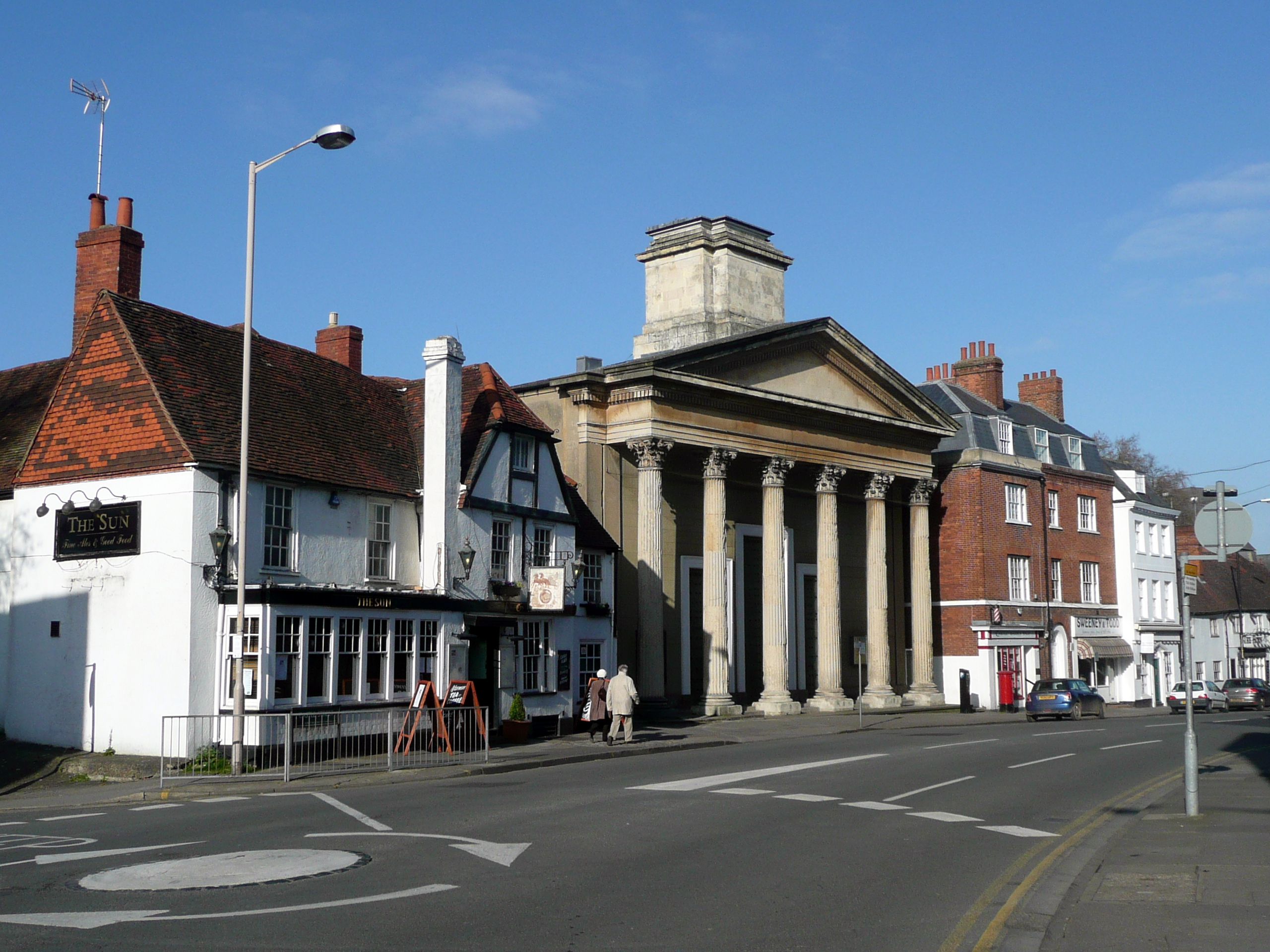
The church in its current street context
