= Trinity Chapel, Conduit Street =

Coordinates: 51.51166°N 0.14256°W

Trinity Chapel was a proprietary chapel in Conduit Street, London. It opened in 1691, and was demolished in 1875.

== History ==
The chapel was originally a moveable timber structure on wheels, placed on Hounslow Heath so that James II could celebrate mass there. After his abdication it was moved to Conduit Street, where it was situated on the south side facing St George Street.

Thomas Tenison, at that time the rector of St Martin-in-the-Fields, later Archbishop of Canterbury, urged that it should be an Anglican chapel of ease for his parish, and it was opened for service in July 1691. Since the site was not freehold, a district could not be assigned to it and it remained a chapel of ease; subsequently St George's, Hanover Square was built nearby. The chapel was later acquired by James Robson, High Bailiff of Westminster, who rebuilt it in brick.

Ministers at the chapel included Thomas Hollingbery (appointed 1777), George Robson (1807), John Thomas Hinds (1831) and Henry Hamilton Beamish (1832). Edward Walford wrote that "the Rev. Dr. Beamish made it by his fervid and eloquent discourses, if not so fashionable, at all events so crowded, that it was impossible to accommodate the congregations which he drew together, without the erection of galleries. The chapel was plain and ugly enough before, but by this addition it was made fairly the most ugly of the then existing proprietary chapels."

The chapel closed in 1875, the ground landlord requiring the site for secular building, and it was demolished.
