= Church of the Apostles (Atlanta) =

Evangelical church in Atlanta, Georgia, US

Coordinates: 33°51′10″N 84°25′47″W

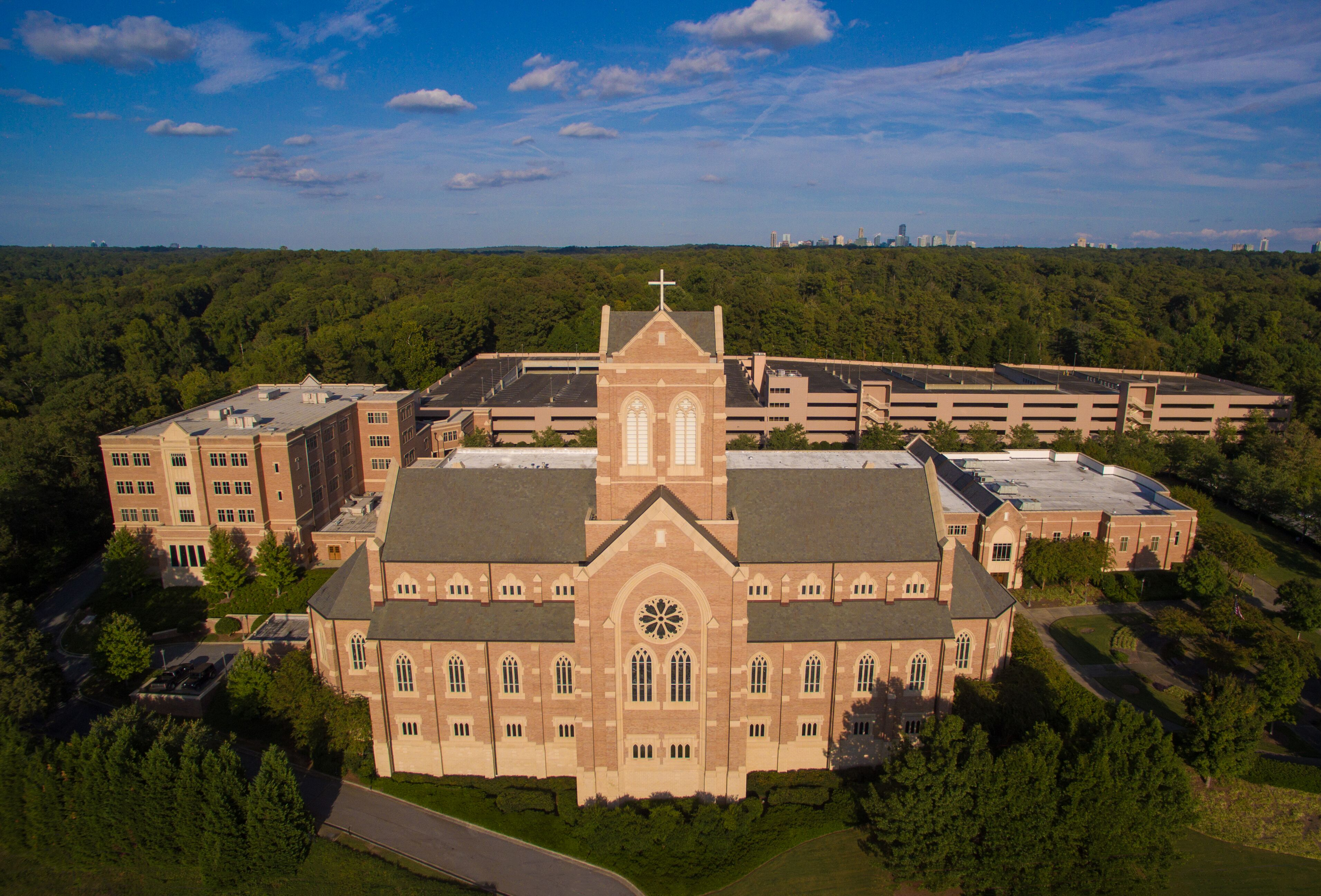
Exterior view of the church

The Church of the Apostles is an American evangelical church located in the Buckhead neighborhood of Atlanta, Georgia. The church was founded in 1987 by Michael Youssef, who left Egypt to attend college in Australia and later immigrated to the United States in 1977.

== History ==
The church was started by Pastor Michael Youssef and 28 people who held a meeting in a local school in 1987. Before its expansion in the late 1990s, the church had 1,150 members and a capacity to seat 1,500. In 2006 at least 3,000 people attended services in the $70 million brick building, then recently completed.

== Facility ==
The prominent Neo-Gothic building is visible from Interstate 75, just south of the Mt. Paran Road exit. The sanctuary seats 2,800, is 240 feet (73 m) high, consists of 100,000 square feet (9,300 m^{2}) of space, and has over 90 stained-glass windows. The west stained-glass windows depict the Apostles, and the stairwell and perimeter stained-glass windows depict the life of Jesus. The rose window is also notable. In addition to the main sanctuary, the facility also includes a 450-seat chapel, fellowship hall, classrooms, administrative space and a parking garage. The site (just south of Nancy Creek) was the location of the old Allstate Insurance office building.

== Ministries ==
The church currently offers, or has recently offered, the following ministries to its congregation and attendees (some are external programs hosted by the church):

- Family Ministry
- Children's Ministry
- Young Families: 20s & 30s, Genuine Wisdom (for single or married women in their 20s and 30s), MAN UP (for single or married men in their 20s and 30s.)
- Student Ministry or "STS" (Student to Student) for 5th - 12th-grade students
- Apostles College Fellowship
- Sunday Morning Classes
- Small Groups: Small Groups usually meet in homes every week or every other week. Some groups also meet at the church.
- Women's Ministry
- Men's Ministry: Men's Fraternity, Men's Small Groups, PATH (one-on-one mentoring), Radical Mentoring, Next Generation Fraternity (Men 25-40)
- Congregational Care: CrossCurrent, DivorceCare, Financial Peace University, GriefShare, Living Waters, OnPath, Stephen Ministry
