= Anglican Mission in England =

Anglican convocation affiliated to the Anglican Network in Europe

Location
- Country: England
- Ecclesiastical province: Anglican Network in Europe

Statistics
- Parishes: 29 (2024)

Information
- Denomination: Anglican
- Rite: Anglican

Current leadership
- Bishop: Tim Davies
- Assistant bishop: Lee McMunn

Website
- Official website

The Anglican Mission in England (AMiE) is an Anglican convocation affiliated to the Anglican Network in Europe that seeks to establish Anglican churches in England outside the Church of England. It was created with the support of the Global Anglican Future Conference, and is part of the Anglican realignment.

== Leadership ==
AMiE has two bishops: Diocesan Bishop Tim Davies and Assistant Bishop Lee McMunn (consecrated as Assistant Bishop in AMiE, 21 October 2022). Andy Lines was the first convocation bishop: he was consecrated on 30 June 2017 as the Missionary Bishop to Europe of the Anglican Church in North America. Andy Lines is now the Presiding Bishop of ANiE.

== History ==
AMiE was formed with the support of GAFCON (The Global Anglican Future Conference). GAFCON gave their full support at their second meeting in Nairobi, in October 2013. Initially its congregations were church plants that had been ejected from the Church of England for various reasons. More recently, evangelical Anglican churches have begun to plant churches under the AMiE banner.

The movement has received the support of the Archbishop of Nigeria, Nicholas Okoh.

In 2016 AMiE set out its vision to plant 25 churches by 2025 and 250 churches by 2050.

Bishop Lines ordained the first nine men as deacons and priests on 7 December 2017, at East London Tabernacle, a Baptist church in east London. Previously, clergymen associated with AMiE had come from the Church of England, or been ordained by Anglican bishops overseas. Eight men were ordained as deacons and one as a priest, all working for AMiE churches. For example, Robert Tearle, 24, was to serve as deacon at Trinity Church Scarborough, a 2017 church plant.

On 14 December 2020, AMIE became a proto-diocese (convocation) affiliated to the newly created Anglican Network in Europe; the network's other convocation is the Anglican Convocation in Europe, which has six churches in Scotland, Portugal, Cornwall and Surrey.

== Theological position ==
AMiE takes a conservative stance on human sexuality, opposing same-sex marriage and women's ordination. Members of the executive of AMiE are required to hold complementarian views. AMiE leaders have made accusations that there is false teaching in Church of England leadership. Bishop Lee McMunn has stated that, while many "faithful Anglicans" remain within the Church of England, others find their route to ordination "blocked by liberal clergy who do not believe orthodox Anglican teachings".

AMiE's stated intent is not to threaten Anglicans within current structures, but to provide support for those already outside the structures.

== Churches ==
AMiE became a convocation on 14 December 2020 and a diocese on 17 June 2023. In June 2024 it had 29 member churches alongside three pioneer congregations led by licensed church planters. Tim Davies and Lee McMunn were consecrated assistant bishops on 21 October 2022 along with Ian Ferguson (asst bishop, ACE).

Name	Location	History	Minister	Assistant minister(s)	Former ministers	Building?
Anchor Church Lymington and Pennington	Lymington, Hampshire	Planted as AMiE church 2019 from Christ Church Westbourne in Bournemouth.	Christopher Henderson (since 2019; ordained CoE 2016)	James Ivin (ordained deacon in AMiE 2023)		Meets in a primary school.
Becontree Church	Becontree, London	Planted as AMiE church 2014 from Dagenham Parish Church (DPC).	Rob Newham (since 2020)		Mike Reith (2014-20; formerly vicar of DPC)	Meets (since 2023) in its own building (built 1930, previously belonged to London City Mission).
Christ Church Balham (CCB)	Balham, London	Sometime Free Church of England; joined AMiE later.	Andy Palmer (ordained CoE; formerly curate, St John's Downshire Hill)			Meets in a school.
Christ Church Bracknell	Bracknell, Berkshire	Licensed church plant. Planted January 2026.	Nick Algeo			
Christ Church Central Sheffield (CCCS)	Sheffield, South Yorkshire	Planted 2005 from Christ Church Fulwood (CCF).	Tim Davies (since 2005; ordained CoE 1993; also Acting Diocesan Bishop)			Meets (since 2017) in its own building (former bar).
Christ Church Greenbank	Greenbank, Cheshire	Planted as CoE church 2002. Joined AMiE 2024.	Dimitri Aldridge			Meets in a railway station.
Christ Church Hessle	Hessle, East Yorkshire		Adam Johnston (since 2022)			Meets in a memorial hall.
Christ Church Huntingdon	Huntingdon, Cambridgeshire	Planted as CoE BMO 2018 from St Andrew the Great, Cambridge. Joined AMiE 2024.	Charlie Newcombe (since 2018; ordained CoE 2007)			Meets in a primary school.
Christ Church Newland	Newland, Kingston upon Hull	Founded 2020 by departing vicar and congregation of St John's, Newland (SJN).	Scott McKay			Meets in a sixth form college.
Christ Church Orchard Park	Orchard Park, Kingston upon Hull	Planted 1970 from Trafalgar Street Church, Hull. Previously Orchard Park Free Church, then Hull Orchard Park Evangelical Church. Joined AMiE 2020.	Rob Tearle			Meets in its own building.
Christ Church Riverside	Newland, Kingston upon Hull	Planted from SJN. Joined AMiE 2020.	Peter Birnie			Meets in a primary school.
Christ Church South Cambs	Sawston, Cambridgeshire	Planted as CoE BMO 2006 from All Saints, Little Shelford (ASLS). Joined AMiE 2013.	Vacant	Ed Mezzetti (since 2022; ordained presbyter in AMiE 2024)	Tim Chapman (since 2006; ordained CoE 2002; formerly curate, ASLS; left to plant an FIEC church, Christ Church Saffron Walden).	Meets in a secondary school.

- Christ Church South Devon. Plymstock, Plymouth. Founded 2024 partly by departing minister and some members of Sherford Community Church BMO (SCC) and partly from St Matthew's Elburton. Minister: Tom Brassil (ordained CoE c. 2014). Meets in an independent church.
- Christ Church Stockport. Stockport, Greater Manchester. Founded 2017/18. Senior minister: Matt Thompson (since 2018; ordained AMiE 2017). Associate minister: Jon Cawsey (since 2018; ordained AMiE 2017). Bishop: Lee McMunn. Meets in rooms owned by a charity.
- Christ Church Walkley. Walkley, Sheffield. Planted 2012 from CCF and CCCS. Pastor: Pete Jackson (since 2012; ordained AMiE 2017). Associate pastor: Kenny Larsen (since 2012; ordained AMiE 2017). Meets in its own building (former memorial hall).
- Cornerstone Church Colchester. Colchester, Essex. Planted 2020 by departing minister and some members. Full church status 2023 (the 25th AMiE church). Minister: John Parker (ordained CoE). Meets in a primary school.
- Cornerstone Church Grays. Grays, Essex. Founded 2020 by departing minister and some members of St Mary's and Emmanuel, Chadwell St Mary. Pastor: Mike Walton (ordained CoE). Meets in a school.
- Grace Church Harrogate. Harrogate, North Yorkshire. LIcensed church plant, planted 2024 from TCS. Meets monthly in a house.
- Grace Church Newton Hall. Newton Hall, Durham. Planted 2017 from Christ Church Durham, a non-aligned Anglican church. Joined AMiE 2021. Minister: Mark Rainbow (ordained 2017). Meets in a community centre.
- Grace Church South Shields. Licensed church plant. Joint plant from HTG and St John's, Hebburn.
- Grace Church Sydenham. Planted 2015 from Grace Church Dulwich and St Helen's Bishopsgate. Joined AMiE 2018. Minister: Tim Iles (ordained CoE 2011). Meets in a community centre.
- Grace Church Windsor. Planted c. 2014 as Windsor Fellowship from St Mary's Maidenhead and Latimer Minster. Joined AMiE and changed name March 2024. Former minister: Tim Hiorns (2021-25; ordained CoE; formerly curate, All Saints Crowborough). Meets in a URC church.
- Holy Trinity Gateshead (HTG). Gateshead, Tyne and Wear. Planted c. 2005 from Jesmond Parish Church. Joined AMiE 2021. Minister: Chris Houghton (since 2022; ordained AMiE 2017; formerly asst. min., CCCS).
- Hope Church East Cowes. East Cowes, Isle of Wight. Licnesed church plant, planted 2023 from SJR. Minister: James Pontin (formerly asst. min., SJR). Meets in a community centre.
- Hope Church Goldthorpe. Goldthorpe, South Yorkshire. Planted 2020 from two South Yorkshire churches. Joined AMiE 2021. Vacant. Previous pastor: Chris Taylor (2021-25). Meets in a school.
- Hope Church Tyneside. Wallsend, Tyne and Wear. Founded 2022 by departures from the CoE. Senior minister: Ben Cadoux-Hudson (since 2022). Meets in a school.
- Hope City Church Wolverhampton. Wolverhampton, West Midlands. Founded 2020. Joined AMiE Jan 2024. Senior minister: Graham Phillips (ordained deacon in AMiE Jan 2024). Meets in a science park.
- Life Church Hackbridge. Hackbridge, London. Licensed church plant, planted Sept 2025 from CCB and Holy Trinity Wallington. Minister: Jonny Burgess (ordained AMiE 2023, 2024). Meets in a community centre.
- Living Word Church Birkenhead. Licensed church plant.
- Redeemer Church Thanet. Planted 2021. Minister: Peter Harvey (ordained CoE 2018).
- Rock Church Denton. Denton, Greater Manchester. Licensed church plant, planted November 2025. Planter: Mark Glew (ordained CoE; resigned as minister of St Mary's, Haughton Green, Denton, 2024).
- St James's, Ryde (SJR). Ryde, Isle of Wight. Founded as CoE proprietary chapel 1827; joined AMiE 2020. Minister: Ben Williamson (since 2025; formerly minister, GCCB). Former minister: James Leggett (ordained CoE 1993).
- St Joseph's, Benwell. Benwell, Newcastle upon Tyne. Planted 2016. Minister: Ken Matthews. Associate minister: Ben Pryke. Assistant minister: David Milnes (ordained AMiE 2024, 2025).
- Trinity Church Bristol. Bristol, Bristol. Planted 2017. Minister: Carl Bicknell (ordained CoE 2010).
- Trinity Church Lancaster. Lancaster, Lancashire. Planted 2015. Minister: Martin Soole (ordained AMiE 2017).
- Trinity Church Scarborough (TCS). Scarborough, North Yorkshire. Planted 2017 from SJN. Minister: Lee McMunn (since 2017; ordained CoE 2005; also Assistant Bishop).

== Former AMiE churches ==
Name	Location	Web	Clergy	Founded	Notes
Anchor Anglican Church, Fowey	Fowey, Cornwall		Philip de Grey-Warter	2019	Formed when the vicar of Fowey Parish Church left the CoE. Left 2020/21. Now part of the Anglican Convocation in Europe (see above).
Christ Church, Salisbury					Now part of IPC (International Presbyterian Church).
Christ Church Wyre Forest	Kidderminster, Worcestershire			2002	Founded 2002 by departing vicar and congregation of St John's Kidderminster. Minister (until 2025): Leo Davidson (ordained CESA). Former minister: Charles Raven. In 2025 merged with an FIEC church, Kidderminster Evangelical Church (KEC), to form a new FIEC church, Grace Church Kidderminster, meeting in the KEC building.
Cornerstone Church Crewe	Crewe, Cheshire		Matt Guest (ordained CoE 2015)	2019	Church plant from Christ Church, Wharton. Left 2020/21.
Grace Church Bude	Bude, Cornwall		Alistair Harper (ordained AMiE 2017)	2019	May be defunct or never have started.
Grace Community Church Bury (GCCB)	Bury, Greater Manchester				Planted 2023. Minister: Ben Williamson. Closed 2025.
King's Church Guildford	Guildford, Surrey		Richard Leadbeater (ordained CoE 2010)	2014	Left 2020/21. Now part of FIEC.

== See also ==
- Free Church of England
- Church of England (Continuing)
