= Church of England (Continuing) =

Division of the Continuing Anglican Movement

The Church of England (Continuing) is part of the Continuing Anglican Movement. It was founded in 1994.

Since 2008 the church has regularly exhibited at the Christian Resources Exhibition at Esher, Surrey and elsewhere in England. It publishes a magazine called The Journal as well as other literature and books. It holds an annual conference. The 2023 conference was held at St Mary's Church, Castle Street, Reading and a day conference is due to be held there in late 2024.

== Origins and doctrine ==
The church was founded on 10 February 1994 at a meeting chaired by David Samuel at St Mary's, Castle Street, Reading, as a reaction against the use of contemporary-language liturgies (particularly the 1980 Alternative Service Book) and the recently approved ordination of women as priests.

The church assents to the unmodified Thirty-Nine Articles of Religion of the Church of England (constitution section 1), and the King James Bible and the 1662 Book of Common Prayer for liturgy. It also follows the historic three-fold ministry of bishops, priests, and deacons, ordained according to the Ordinal of the 1662 Book of Common Prayer. Its doctrine is Calvinist, and it stands in the conservative evangelical Protestant tradition.

The church maintains a conservative view on Christian leadership, and women are not permitted to teach at meetings or to exercise authority in the church (constitution section 3).

== Congregations ==
The Church of England (Continuing) has one church building, St Mary's in Reading, which was the church of its founding member, David Samuel. A second group meets in Wolverhampton, in the former Long Street synagogue (built 1903). Additionally, small groups meet in a rented hall in Wimbledon, and a community centre in Frinton-on-Sea.

These are the four congregations listed by the church as of 2020:

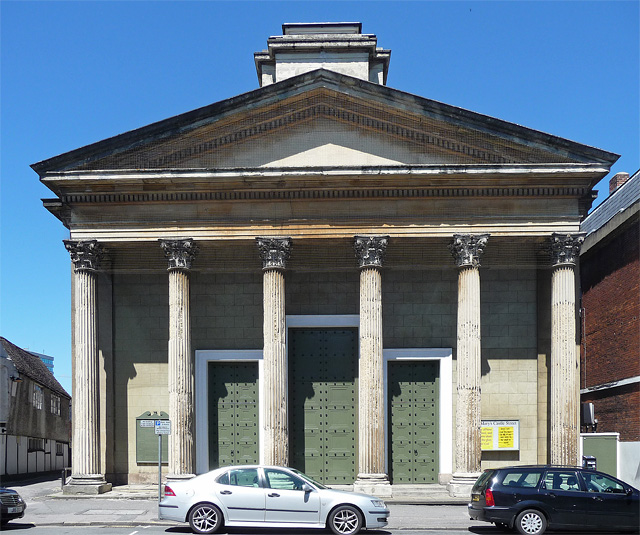
- St Mary's church, Castle Street, Reading, Berkshire.
  St Mary's Church, Castle Street, Reading, Berkshire – minister, Edward J. Malcolm
- St John's Church, Wimbledon, London – minister, Peter Ratcliff
- St Silas' Church, Wolverhampton - minister Kyle Mulholland, who left the CoE to join in 2024. Before that the church had been in vacancy for twelve years.
- Holy Trinity Church, Frinton-on-Sea – lay minister, Philip Lievesley

A fifth congregation, at Nuffield, has since closed.

== Leadership ==
The church has had three presiding bishops since its foundation:

- David Samuel, 1995–2001
- Edward Malcolm, 2001–2013
- Edward J Malcolm, 2013–present

The first bishop of the church was its founder, David Samuel, who is now retired. He consecrated as his successor Edward Malcolm, minister of St Silas' Wolverhampton, who died on 17 November 2013. The current presiding bishop is Edward J. Malcolm, minister of St Mary's, Reading, who was also consecrated by David Samuel, one week after the death of Edward Malcolm in 2013.

The bishop, Edward J Malcolm, is currently one of only three active clergymen in the church, although there are several lay readers and preachers.

The church establishes its episcopal succession from Albion Knight (1924–2012), Archbishop of the United Episcopal Church of North America, who consecrated David Samuel on 11 June 1995. The closest link of episcopal succession with the Church of England is John Moore (Archbishop of Canterbury), who consecrated William White of Pennsylvania in 1787, and from whom Knight claimed his succession.
