= Keswick Convention =

Annual evangelical Christian gathering in England

Keswick Convention Trust
- Keswick Ministries is the operational name for The Keswick Convention Trust
- Founded: 1875
- Founder: Rev T D Harford-Battersby, Robert Wilson
- Type: Registered as a British charity and a private company, limited by guarantee with no share capital
- Purpose: To promote Bible teaching at an annual Convention in Keswick and on other occasions with the aim of encouraging holy and Biblical life styles.
- Location: Keswick, Cumbria, UK
- Coordinates: 54°36′03″N 3°07′44″W (Convention Centre, Skiddaw St); 54°36′10″N 3°08′27″W (Rawnsley Centre)
- Region served: UK
- Key people: John Risbridger (Chairman); James Robson (Ministry Director); Jodi Whitehouse (Operations Director); Steve Adam (Hon Treasurer); Simon Overend (Secretary)
- Revenue: ▲£ 2,461,842 (2016)
- Employees: 12
- Volunteers: 600 (during Convention weeks)
- Website: www.keswickministries.org

The Keswick Convention is an annual gathering of conservative evangelical Christians in Keswick, in the English county of Cumbria.

The Christian theological tradition of Keswickianism, also known as the Higher Life movement, became popularised through the Keswick Conventions, the first of which was a tent revival in 1875 at St John's Church in Keswick.

== History ==
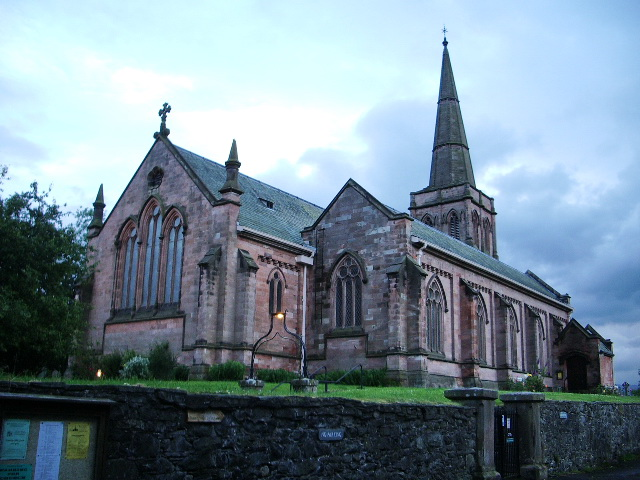
St John's Church, Keswick

The Keswick Convention began in 1875 as a focal point for the Higher Life movement in the United Kingdom. It was founded by an Anglican, Canon T. D. Harford-Battersby, and a Quaker, Robert Wilson. They held the first Keswick Convention in a tent on the lawn of St John's vicarage, Keswick, beginning with a prayer meeting on the evening of Monday, 28 June. During the conference—which continued till Friday morning—over 400 people attended uniting under the banner of "All One in Christ Jesus"—which is still the convention's watchword.

Robert Pearsall Smith, a Quaker lay leader influenced by the Plymouth Brethren, probably influenced the convention's use of the American term "convention", rather than the British "conference". During the same time period, D. L. Moody—the New England evangelist—also employed the same term to denote a special Christian gathering.

Among the Keswick Convention's early notable speakers were the Anglicans J. W. Webb-Peploe, Evan Henry Hopkins, E. W. Moore, William Haslam, W. Hay, M. H. Aitken and Handley Moule, as well as the South-African reformed pastor Andrew Murray and a Baptist, Frederick Brotherton Meyer. The founder of the China Inland Mission, Hudson Taylor, also spoke; and in response Amy Carmichael decided to dedicate her life to missions.

By 1897 the New York Times was reporting that over 1,200 ministers were attending the annual convention, from every part of the United Kingdom and beyond.

In 1903 at the convention, Barclay Fowell Buxton and Paget Wilkes founded the Japan Evangelistic Band. The convention also influenced John George Govan, who later founded The Faith Mission in Scotland; and the highly influential founder of the Iwerne camps, E. J. H. Nash, valued the Keswick Convention and considered R. A. Torrey his theological mentor.

It was Stephen Olford who introduced Billy Graham to the Keswick message at a Keswick Convention in 1946. Graham wrote in his autobiography, Just As I Am, that this teaching came to him as a second blessing.

At the 1965 convention, the Rev. John Stott, Rector of All Souls, Langham Place, gave the week's Bible readings on Paul's epistle to the Romans, chapters 5 to 8. His exposition of chapter 6, in particular concerning "death to sin", is now regarded as a key watershed in recent Keswick teaching, departing from the approach taken to this passage in earlier years. Price and Randall state that "more than thirty years on the so called traditional Keswick stance on Romans 6 would now hardly ever be heard from the Keswick platform".

In 1969 a second week was added to the programme, this taking the form of a "Holiday Convention" giving more free time for visitors to enjoy the local area. In 1975 the centenary celebrations were held, with the highlight being an address by Billy Graham before some 15,000 people gathered at the town's Crow Park on the shores of Derwentwater.

A new building, Keswick Convention Centre was opened on 12 July 1987, on the site in Skiddaw Street. The rear of the roof became a point of support for the tent erected for each year's convention event. The following year during the second convention week, the tent was destroyed in a storm on the Monday night. Two days later a replacement tent had been acquired and erected and the programme was able to be resumed as normal.

In order to extend the range of activities undertaken, Rawnsley Hall, formerly part of the Keswick School, was purchased by the Convention Trust in 1997. This is located about 10 minutes walk from the Convention Centre and now forms the focal point for all the older children's and youth work.

In January 2000, a position statement was issued by the Convention Council to address the question as to how Keswick see its role in the 21st century. The following specific goals were set out:

- The lordship of Christ in personal and corporate living
- Life transformation through the fullness of the Holy Spirit
- Evangelism and mission in the British Isles and world-wide
- Discipleship and training of people of all ages
- Demonstration of evangelical unity, in particular sustaining Keswick's breadth of involvement with all evangelical "tribes".

In 2001, in response to a need for additional funds and for additional capacity—notably for families and younger people—a third week was added.

Keswick Ministries was established in 2003 with the aim of taking the Bible teaching ministry at the convention to a wider audience both nationally and internationally throughout the year using the many and varied forms of media available.

== Modern format ==
=== Organisation ===
Keswick Convention is run by Keswick Ministries, the operational name for Keswick Convention Trust. The charity exists to promote bible teaching at the annual convention with the aim of encouraging holy and biblical lifestyles. Trustees are drawn from a number of Christian organisations and denominations but on a personal basis only not as sponsored or in delegated roles. The Trust employs a full-time operations manager and a small number of permanent staff, based at the Convention Centre. During the convention event itself a heavy reliance is placed on recruiting volunteers to join the various support teams.

During 2013 the Council decided to create a new post of chief executive officer who would be responsible for the development of the convention, the wider work of Keswick Ministries, the use of the two sites and the strategic partnerships. Jonathan Lamb, a previous chairman of the council, was subsequently appointed as the first CEO and minister-at-large, commencing 5 May 2014.[6]

In the 21st century, the annual convention is still centred in a large purpose-built tent erected over a concrete showground with audio-visual facilities to aid praise and teaching. The venue is entered via the Convention Centre: a narrow two-storey block containing offices, a small shop etc., which fronts the site on Skiddaw Street. Additionally, events (including the main youth activities) take place around Keswick chiefly in the convention's other venue, its own Rawnsley Centre, but also in local churches and meeting halls. The aggregate attendance over the three weeks in 2015 was 12,000.

The convention comprises three consecutive weeks in July and finally ending on the first Friday in August. Each week has its own presenters, speakers and musicians, but to a common theme. The weekly pattern starts with the opening meeting on Saturday evening and concludes with the Communion and celebration service on Friday evening. A major feature of each week is the morning Bible readings running from Monday to Friday. These consist of a series of expositions, usually from one book of the Bible, given by the principal guest speaker for that week. Each week covers a different part of the Bible. Other invited speakers cover related topics in the evening meetings, seminars and book café events.

The event does not charge any admission or registration fees but relies on voluntary donations to meet expenditures. An amount of 110 pounds per person is needed. The 15,000 visitors to the convention find their own accommodation in the town, either in hotels, B&Bs, self-catering properties, or on one of a number of caravan or camping sites nearby. The campsite at Crosthwaite is run as a trading subsidiary of the trust to help funding.

=== Media and publications ===
All meetings in the main tent are recorded on video and audio formats. A compilation CD of the year's praise and worship is released each Autumn. Talks from the Keswick Convention are broadcast weekly on a Christian radio station, Trans World Radio, as part of the Keswick Programme hosted by Trevor Newman.

The convention publishes, in December, a Year Book in paperback format giving a selection of the teaching from that year's events. Other books are also published throughout the year featuring Keswick speakers and topics.

BBC Radio 4 has broadcast from the convention for its Sunday Worship programme on a number of occasions in recent years.

=== Keswick Youth and Children ===
Keswick Youth & K4K (Keswick for Kids) are parallel programs within the main event. They offer a range of Bible teaching and activities for those aged 3–18 years. Both purposefully teach the same material as the main event in order to support families learning together and facilitate conversations across generations. Across the 3 weeks the event draws around 3000 young people.

Since 2018 Keswick has partnered with Growing Young Disciples who assist with the training the Keswick Youth & K4K volunteers.

=== Other events ===
The Keswick Convention hosts two shorter "Bible Weeks" (Spring and Autumn) and other events throughout the year. Related to, but not directly managed by the convention, there are up to 20 "Keswick-style" events which take place over the year in various towns and cities in the United Kingdom. The convention also has close links with Word Alive which takes place in Spring in North Wales.

== The Derwent Project ==
In May 2015, it was reported that the site of Keswick's former pencil factory would become the new base for the convention. Keswick Ministries announced that it had completed a deal to buy the site from local businessman Keith Graham, of Pelican Ventures Ltd. The site is adjacent to the existing Rawnsley site and Simon Overend, operations manager, said that the idea of a single integrated site is very attractive and will allow the convention to grow even further and give flexibility over both sites. The move has been generally welcomed by townsfolk and Allerdale borough council. Tony Lywood commented that he very much welcomed the sale to Keswick Ministries, which is an idea that he had promoted for a long time, as it would solve so many issues for the Keswick Convention and the town. The pencil museum will still remain on the site, which was vacated by the Cumberland Pencil Co in 2008 when it relocated to a new facility in Workington. Planners want to see the pencil factory premises retained for industrial use.

The subsequent launch of “The Derwent Project” was one of the high spots over the three weeks of the 2015 Convention. The project aims to raise £5 million over the next three years. Most of the funds needed relate to the costs of acquiring the new site, demolishing the derelict buildings, improving access on foot and by car, and landscaping the combined sites to make them ready for an enlarged and integrated summer Convention in 2017. Jonathan Lamb, CEO, added that there are currently no immediate plans to dispose of the Skiddaw Street site at which the main meetings are currently held since this site will be needed to sustain the convention's operations for the next year or two. However, in the future, he recognised that the site might be developed for alternative purposes compatible with the locality.

Further details released during 2016 are that the project will feature a main building, an all year round 400-seat auditorium plus up to six "break out" en suite rooms and accommodation for 60 people. There will also be a dining area, toilets and an integrated space for the siting of the main convention tent and associated marquees. Updates during the 2016 Convention confirmed that the site had in fact been purchased during 2015 by another Christian trust (The Lind Trust) on behalf of the convention. The requirement is to repay The Lind Trust £3m by September 2018. The Keswick Ministries reported that the cost was more likely to be higher than that reported by Jonathan Lamb who earlier reported that the overall expenditure was now expected to be nearer £7m.

At the 2017 Convention it was reported that there had been good internal support for the Project. The purchase of The Pencil Factory Site from The Lind Trust had recently been completed one year earlier than planned and for which The Lind Trust had generously agreed to forgo £400,000 of the £3m price. Development of the site including reuse (not demolition) of the Pencil Factory buildings would now be the next focus for fundraising for the Project.

== Convention themes and Bible reading speakers ==
From 1978 the annual ministry book published each December has taken the title of the convention theme for that year (although only since 1991 has the convention itself been given a specific theme in the pre-publicity). In addition to the main speakers listed below, who are all men, each week has up to 16 other speakers covering seminars, evening celebrations and afternoon events. A full list of all speakers for the years 1875 to 1996 is given in Maurice Rowlandson's book.

Year	Theme	Week 1	Week 2	Week 3
1978	The Gospel, The Spirit, The Church	John Stott	Dick Lucas	
1979	The Lord is King	Alec Motyer	Eric Alexander	
1980	The People and the King	Donald English	Bp John B.Taylor	
1981	Purity and Power	Dick Lucas	Alan Flavelle	
1982	Walking with the King	Alec Motyer	Philip Hacking	
1983	Living the Light	Richard France	David Jackman	
1984	God's Very Own People	Donald English	Stuart Briscoe	
1985	Giving God the Glory	Eric Alexander	Michael Baughen	
1986	Rebuilding The Foundations	Dick Lucas	Keith Weston	
1987	New Beginnings, Old Paths	Raymond Brown	David Jackman	
1988	Real People - Real Faith	Donald English	Stuart Briscoe	
1989	Servants of the King	Philip Hacking	Chuck Smith	
1990	Looking To Jesus	Michael Baughen	Charles Price	
1991	The Kingdom, Power and the Glory	R. T. Kendall	Roy Clements	
1992	The Cross and the Crown	Derick Bingham	Raymond Brown	
1993	Dangerous Faith	Donald English	Alistair Begg	
1994	The Whole Family of God	Philip Hacking	Jim Graham	
1995	The Light of His Coming	Alec Motyer	Roy Clements	
1996	Clean Hands	Michael Wilcock	Stuart Briscoe	
1997	A Voice in the Wilderness	Michael Baughen	Charles Price	
1998	Truth on Fire	Chris Wright	Alistair Begg	
1999	Deep Impact	Don Carson	Nigel Lee	
2000	One Lord, One Church, One Task	John Stott	Jonathan Lamb	
2001	A Different Drumbeat	Michael Baughen	Steve Gaukroger	Stuart Briscoe
2002	Learning Together as God's Royal Family	Bruce Milne	Liam Goligher	Steve Brady
2003	From Base Camp To Summit	Joseph Stowell	Charles Price	Vaughan Roberts
2004	Out of Control?	Alistair Begg	Jonathan Lamb	Derek Tidball
2005	The Glory of the Gospel	Sinclair Ferguson	Steve Gaukroger	Dominic Smart
2006	The Church in the Power of the Spirit	Chris Wright	Ajith Fernando	Vaughan Roberts
2007	Unshackled ? Living in Outrageous Grace	Alec Motyer	Steve Brady	Ian Coffey
2008	Creation, Chaos & Christ	David Cook	Liam Goligher	Charles Price
2009	Faith that Works	Dale Ralph Davies	Jonathan Lamb	Vaughan Roberts
2010	Christ-centred Renewal	Don Carson	Paul Mallard	Alistair Begg
2011	Word to the World Good news to the nations	Ajith Fernando	Chris Wright	Peter Maiden
2012	Going the Distance Living in the light of the future	Simon Manchester	Steve Brady	Jeremy McQuoid
2013	The Transforming Trinity Knowing the triune God	Charles Price	John Lennox	Steve Gaukroger
2014	Really? Searching for reality in a confusing world	Vaughan Roberts	Jonathan Lamb	Chris Sinkinson
2015	The Whole of Life for Christ	John Risbridger	Paul Mallard	Liam Goligher
2016	Power to change Becoming like God's son	Simon Manchester	Steve Brady	David Jackman
2017	Captivated Hearing God's Word	Don Carson	Alistair Begg	Ivor Poobalan
2018	Sent: Serving God's Mission	Christopher Ash	Chris Wright	David Cook
2019	Longing	John Risbridger	Vaughan Roberts	Ray Ortlund
2020	Hope* Virtually Keswick Convention	Christopher Ash	No week 2 due to COVID-19	No week 3 due to COVID-19
2021	Faithful	Paul Mallard	Tim Chester	Mark Meynell
2022	Grateful	Alistair Begg	Jeremy McQuoid	Martin Salter
2023	Human	Sam Allberry	Jonathan Griffiths	Ivor Poobalan
2024	Resurrection	David Gibson	Andrew Sach	Vaughan Roberts
2025	Transformed	Andy Gemmill	Tim Chester	Dane Ortlund
2026	Strong in his strength	Andy Robinson	Christopher Ash	Michael Reeves
2027	Rend the Heavens	TJ Tims	Martin Salter	Jason Roach

(* Convention was cancelled due to COVID-19. They instead ran all of their sessions, including youth work, live on YouTube.)

== List of chairmen ==
Convention(s)	Chairman
1875–1882	Canon T. Dundas Harford-Battersby
1883–1889	Henry Francis Bowker
1890–1900	Robert Wilson
1901	Albert Head / General Hatt-Noble / The Rev Francis Paynter (shared)
1902	Albert Head / Capt F.L. Tottenham (shared)
1903–1916	Trustees
1917	(no convention)
1918–1920	Canon John Battersby-Harford
1921–1924	W.H. Wilson
1925–1929	The Rev John Stuart Holden
1930–1932	R.B. Stewart
1933–1935	J.M. White
1936–1939	The Rev William H. Aldis
1940–1941	(no convention)
1942–1943	The Rev E.L. Langston (held in London churches)
1944	(no convention)
1945	The Rev E.L. Langston (held in Westminster Chapel)
1946–1947	The Rev William H. Aldis
1948–1951	Fred Mitchell
1952–1969	The Rev Alfred Thomas (Tim) Houghton
1970–1974	The Rev John A. Caiger
1975	Canon A.T. Houghton (acting chairman)
1976–1984	Canon Alan S. Neech
1985–1993	The Rev Philip H. Hacking
1994–1996	The Rev Keith A.A. Weston
1997–2000	Jonathan Lamb
2001–2009	Peter Maiden
2010–2011	Jonathan Lamb
2012–2017	John Risbridger
2017-2020	Tim Chester
2020-present	Jeremy McQuoid

== Sources ==
- Barabas, Steven So Great Salvation, London: Marshall, Morgan & Scott, 1952—a friendly overview of half a century of Keswick teaching.
- Drumond, Lewis, "The Canvas Cathedral", Thomas Nelson, Nashville, 2005.
- Harford-Battersby, T. D. Memoirs of the Keswick Convention, 1890.
- Hopkins, E. H. The Story of Keswick, London, 1892.
- Harford, Charles F. (ed.) The Keswick Convention; its Message, its Method and its Men, London, 1907. (available as an ebook, https://archive.org/stream/keswickconvent00unknuoft#page/n0/mode/2up)
- Lamb, Jonathan & Randall, Ian, Knowing God Better : The Vision of the Keswick Movement, Keswick Ministries, 2015. ISBN 978-1-78359-369-9
- Pierson, A. T. The Keswick Movement , New York.
- Price, Charles & Randall, Ian, Transforming Keswick, OM Publishing, Carlisle, Cumbria, 2000. ISBN 978-1-85078-350-3
- Richmond, Joan M, Nine Letters from an Artist The Families of William Gillard, Porphyrogenitus, 2015. ISBN 978-1-871328-19-6
- Rowlandson, M. L. Life at the Keswick Convention, OM Publishing, Carlisle, Cumbria, 1997. ISBN 978-1-85078-248-3
- Sloan, Walter B. These Sixty Years : The story of the Keswick Convention, Pickering & Inglis, London & Edinburgh, 1935
- Stevenson, Herbert F. Keswick's Authentic Voice: Sixty-five Dynamic Addresses Delivered at the Keswick Convention 1875-1957. London: Marshall, Morgan & Scott, 1959.
- Pollock, J.C. The Keswick Story, Hodder and Stoughton, London, 1964 (The Authorised History of the Keswick Convention)
- Williams, Derek The Spirit of Keswick, Keswick Convention Trust, Harrow, Middlesex, 1988 (36pp booklet)
