= Dick Lucas (minister) =

Anglican minister

The Reverend Prebendary Dick Lucas
- Born: Richard Charles Lucas; 10 September 1925 (age 101)
- Education: Trinity College, Cambridge; Ridley Hall, Cambridge
- Religion: Anglicanism
- Church: Church of England
- Ordained: 1951 (deacon); 1952 (priest)
- Congregations served: St Nicholas' Church, Sevenoaks; Church Pastoral Aid Society; St Helen's Bishopsgate
- Offices held: Rector of St Helen's Bishopsgate (1961–1998)

Richard Charles Lucas (born 10 September 1925) is an Anglican priest, best known for his long ministry at St Helen's Bishopsgate, a conservative evangelical church in London, England, and for his work as founder of the Proclamation Trust and the Cornhill Training Course.

== Early life ==
Lucas was born on 10 September 1925 in Lewes, Sussex. He attended Radley College. He was converted to evangelical Christianity in 1941 under the Iwerne camps ministry of E. J. H. Nash. Lucas began university studies at Oxford, but left to serve in the Royal Navy during World War II. After the war, he continued his undergraduate studies at Trinity College, Cambridge (BA 1949, MA 1957).

== Ordained ministry ==
Lucas completed ordination training at Ridley Hall, and was ordained in the Church of England as a deacon in 1951, and then as a priest in 1952. Lucas' first curacy was served as at St Nicholas' Church, Sevenoaks, from 1951 to 1955, before he joined the staff of the Church Pastoral Aid Society from 1955 until 1961.

Lucas became Rector of St. Helen's Bishopsgate in 1961, and served the church as its Rector for thirty-seven years until 1998. Under his leadership, St. Helen's grew from a small congregation of a few individuals to a large thriving church with a ministry to city workers, families, students and young professionals. He developed a reputation for strong Bible teaching and preaching. He emerged as a widely respected evangelical speaker, particularly at the Keswick Convention. He was outspoken among his generation of evangelical ministers in encouraging systematic expositional preaching. With this in mind, Lucas was among those who established a popular and widely duplicated programme of training workshops for preachers. Today, his former church has an archive of over 1,800 talks and sermons from him.

In May 1986 Lucas founded the Proclamation Trust, the aim of which is to encourage ministry that seeks to "expound the Bible as God's Word for today", and remained a trustee for many years.

He is Rector Emeritus of St Helen's, where he frequently returned each summer to preach.

Although prioritising preaching and teaching, Lucas is the author of a number of evangelical books and commentaries. With John Stott, J. I. Packer and others, Lucas was a key figure in shaping the conservative evangelical movement in the United Kingdom during the 20th century.

== Bibliography ==
Commentaries:

- Lucas, R. C. (1980). The Message of Colossians & Philemon (The Bible Speaks Today Series), Leicester: Inter-Varsity Press. ISBN 0-85111-521-7
- Lucas & Green (Dec 1995). The Message of 2 Peter and Jude (The Bible Speaks Today Series), Leicester: Inter-Varsity Press. ISBN 978-0-8308-1238-7

Keswick paperbacks:

- Lucas, et al. (1978). The Gospel, the Spirit, the Church: Keswick ministry from John Stott, Dick Lucas, Ken Prior, Gilbert Kirby and others, UK: STL Books [for] Keswick Convention Council. ISBN 978-0-903843-02-7
- Lucas, et al. (Nov 1981). Purity and Power: Keswick Convention Ministry, 1981, UK: Send the Light Trust. ISBN 978-0-903843-59-1
- Lucas, et al. (Nov 1986). Rebuilding the Foundations (1986 Keswick Convention), UK: Send the Light. ISBN 978-1-85078-013-7

Other works:

- Lucas & Philip (1980). Teaching John: Unlocking the Gospel of John for the Expositor (Proclamation Trust Media), UK: Christian Focus Publications. ISBN 978-1-85792-790-0
- Jackopson & Lucas (April 1992). Good Morning, Disciple, UK: Zondervan. ISBN 978-0-551-02584-4
- Peter Adam (foreword by Lucas) (30 May 2004). Speaking God's Words: A Practical Theology of Preaching, UK: Regent College Publishing. ISBN 978-1-57383-322-6
- Green and Jackman (1995). When God's Voice is Heard: Essays on preaching presented to Dick Lucas (Leicester: IVP) ISBN 0-85110-656-0
