= David Jackman =

David Jackman may refer to:

- David Jackman (musician)
- David Jackman (minister)
- David Jackman (politician)
