= Above Bar Church, Southampton =

Coordinates: 50.9052°N 1.4046°W

Above Bar Church
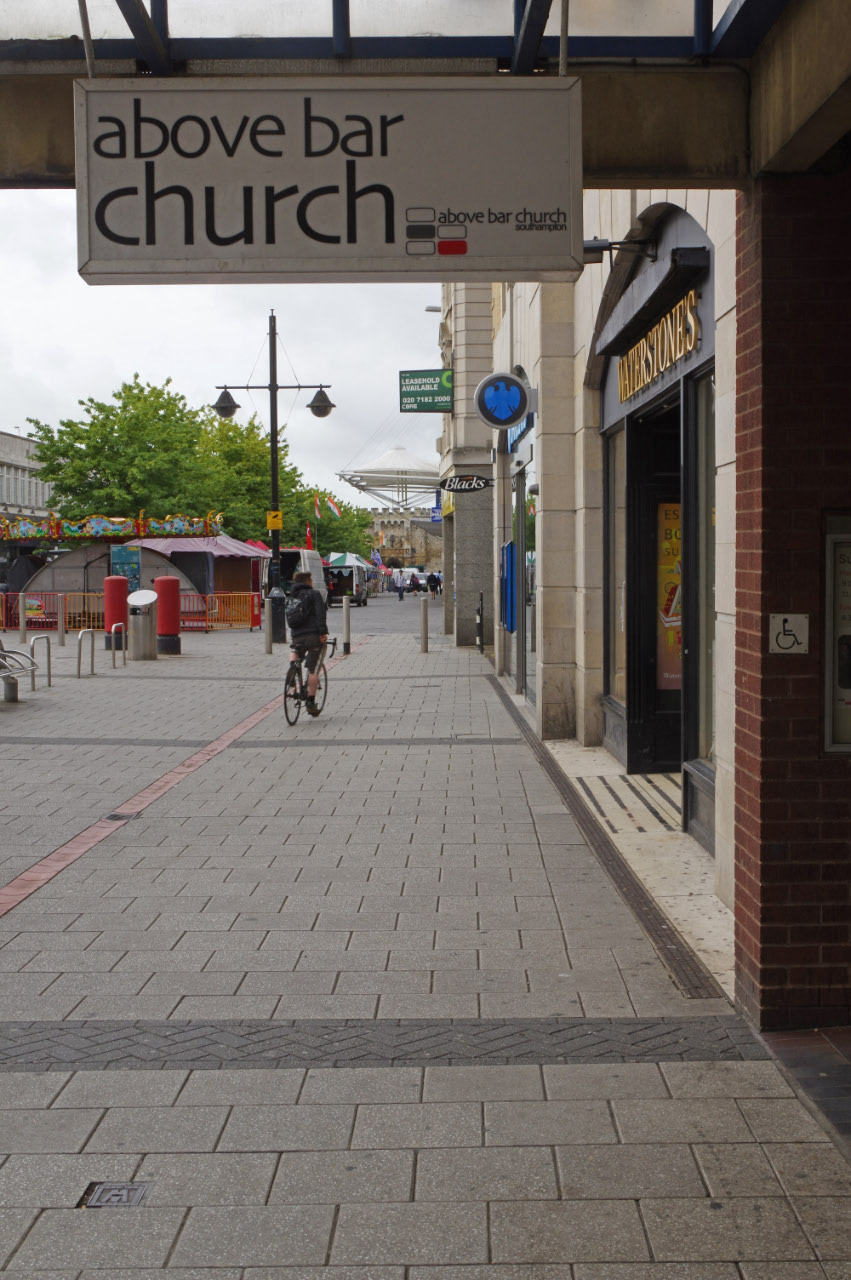
- Above Bar Church
- Location: Above Bar Church; 69 Above Bar Street; Southampton; SO14 7FE
- Denomination: Independent (affiliated to Fellowship of Independent Evangelical Churches)
- Website: www.abovebarchurch.org.uk

History
- Founded: 1876
- Founder: Henry Samuel Earl

Architecture
- Architect: Robert Potter of Brandt Potter Associates
- Style: Modernist
- Years built: 1981

Above Bar Church is an evangelical church in Southampton, affiliated to the Fellowship of Independent Evangelical Churches. The building is on the corner of Above Bar Street and Ogle Road in Southampton City Centre, with shops on the ground level and the auditorium and other rooms above them.

== History ==
This history is based on Past and Present, a booklet published by the church for the opening of a new building in 1981.

=== Founding of the church ===
Above Bar Church was established in 1876 by Henry Samuel Earl, a missionary with the Foreign Christian Missionary Society of the Disciples of Christ (then synonymous with the Churches of Christ; the two became formally separate in 1906). Earl started preaching in the Philharmonic Rooms on Above Bar Street (on the site of what later became the Odeon cinema and is now shops) in February 1876, with a local choir to lead the singing and the widow of a Congregational minister playing the organ. More than seven hundred people came to the first service, and even more the following week despite a snowstorm. On the third Sunday, the hall was full. The majority of these people were members of other churches, of course, but a regular congregation began to develop. Henry Earl rented a small Baptist church that was being used as a warehouse and had it repaired and furnished to seat more than 300 people. As well as filling this building to capacity on Sunday mornings, Earl was soon also running week-night services and had started a Sunday School. A church was formally established in August 1876 with an initial membership of 33.

A clothing manufacturer from the north of England, Timothy Coop, donated £3,000 to Earl towards the cost of buying land and constructing a permanent building. Between the Philharmonic Hall and Ogle Road was a 60-foot-wide (18 m) plot of land, which Earl bought for £1000. He also bought three more lots in Ogle Road for £300. One of these was a skating rink (both ice skating and roller skating were popular in the late 1870s) and the other two were part of the grounds of a large mansion, Ogle Hall. Volunteers from the church dismantled the skating rink and used the bricks and windows for the new church building, which opened in 1880. On 17 August 1886, a Trust Deed was signed, passing the ownership of the site and building to the trustees of ‘Church of Christ, Above Bar’.

Henry Earl stayed in Southampton for less than ten years (though it seems he didn't return to the USA until 1891), by which time he had baptised around four hundred people and the membership of the church had grown to over 100. Earl handed over leadership of the church to Aurelius Glidden, who stayed just two years, but who saw continued growth. There were six more ministers, mainly Americans, during the next 25 years, often with considerable gaps between them. The church continued to grow gradually, and increasingly moved away from the influence and control of the Church of Christ in America, as well as becoming more financially independent.

=== 1912–1979 ===
In 1912, a new minister was appointed, Frederick Phillips, a former electrical engineer. As a young man, he had been a deacon at Above Bar Congregational Church just down the road, and for the three years prior to becoming minister of the Church of Christ, he pastored a mission church in Winchester. In 1917, the final break with the American denomination came when British Churches of Christ were offered the opportunity to either join a national federation or become independent. The church continued to grow during World War I and, by the early 1920s, the membership had risen to 400, with much larger congregations. Phillips held the post for the next forty years, retiring in 1952 at the age of 82. At his retirement he recalled a time when the morning service had a congregation of only twenty, and commented that, ‘It is really wonderful how God has brought it up’. Another minister remarked that he didn't know another church for miles around that had seen so many people converted to Christian faith.

Frederick Phillips was succeeded by Leith Samuel, who was the minister for 27 years. Leith Samuel had previously been a Missioner with Intervarsity Fellowship and was a gifted evangelist and Bible teacher with a strong commitment to systematic expository preaching. This was a period of significant development in the church. It was renamed Above Bar Church, there was a growing commitment to world mission, home Bible study groups were introduced, and assistant ministers and pastoral workers were appointed.

In the 1970s, the ageing building, built on a tight budget almost a hundred years before, was badly showing its age. After a major crack appeared in the ceiling in May 1976, it became clear that it would cost £150,000 to repair the building. And it would still remain a large and inflexible Victorian barn of a building with very limited ancillary rooms. For a number of years, developers had been approaching the church wanting to make use of the prime site. Now, with a desperate need for action, another developer suggested a scheme with shops on the ground floor, the church above and still with an entrance on Above Bar Street. The church was positive about the plan and appointed Robert Potter, of Brandt Potter Associates, as architect. Royal Insurance Investment Department took over the developer's interest in the scheme and covered a substantial proportion of the building costs. The final service in the old building took place on 1 July 1979.

=== Post 1980 ===
David Jackman, who was appointed as Assistant Minister in 1976, became the Senior Minister on Leith Samuel's retirement in 1980. The new church building opened in 1981 and provided much better facilities than the previous one, though with a smaller seating capacity in the main body of the church. The auditorium, which seats over four hundred, was designed by Robert Potter as a hexagon, drawing on the concept of the amphitheatre with the partially tiered seating angled towards the front. The ceiling is made of Columbian pine, while much of the woodwork at ground level is beech. The communion table, made for the new building is of English elm. The basement, which was nearly not included in the project, has roughly the same area as the previous church hall, while the top hall is significantly larger. The organ was built by Copeman Hart for the church in 1977–79, and was first installed in the old building for a few months before demolition.

In 1991, David Jackman resigned to start the Proclamation Trust's Cornhill Training Course. There was a gap of just over five years before Dr. John Balchin was appointed as Senior Minister in January 1997. He retired in 2004 and was succeeded by John Risbridger in September of that year. Paul Webber joined the staff in 2011 (replacing Andrew Page, who stepped down to focus full-time on UCCF's The Mark Drama), and Tim Sutton, who joined in 2013 (replacing Paul Allcock on his retirement).
