= NEAC =

NEAC may refer to:

- New English Art Club, an art group founded in London in 1885
- North Eastern Athletic Conference, now the United East Conference, an NCAA athletic conference
- National Evangelical Anglican Congress, a congress for Evangelicals in the Church of England
- NEAC (computers) series of computers made by NEC
