= Philip Hacking =

English Anglican priest (1931–2024)

The Reverend Philip Hacking

Personal life
- Born: 20 February 1931 Blackburn, Lancashire, England
- Died: 3 December 2024 (aged 93)

Religious life
- Religion: Christian (Anglican)
- Church: St Helen's Liverpool (1955-1958); Edinburgh St Thomas (1959-1968); Fulwood Sheffield (1968-1997)

Senior posting
- Post: Anglican priest
- Period in office: 1955–present

Philip Henry Hacking (20 February 1931 – 3 December 2024) was an English Anglican priest, itinerant evangelical speaker, Bible teacher and occasional author.

== Early life and career ==
Philip Hacking gained a BA degree in History at St Peter's College, University of Oxford, in 1953 (subsequently also an MA in 1957), and then trained for the Anglican ministry at Oak Hill Theological College, London. He was ordained in 1955 and began a curacy in the Parish of St Helen in St Helens, near Liverpool. This was followed by nine years as curate-in-charge and rector of St Thomas, Edinburgh (1959–1968). In October 1968 Philip was appointed vicar of Christ Church, Fulwood, Sheffield. He remained as vicar in this parish for 29 years before retiring from full-time ministry in 1997. He still maintained connections with the church, preaching on occasions, and held a diocesan permission to officiate.

In addition to his parish ministry, Philip became involved in different aspects of British and worldwide Christian work. He was chairman of the Keswick Convention from 1984 to 1993; was national chairman of Reform (a conservative evangelical group within the Church of England); was chairman of Word Alive (formerly a part of Spring Harvest) from 1993 to 2000; and for 12 years was chairman of SUM Fellowship (Sudan United Mission), now Pioneers UK. He has led many evangelistic missions and Bible convention events in the UK and overseas. He has written a number of books and his Bible teaching has been widely recorded on audio cassette, CD and DVD media formats.

In an article in the monthly newspaper, Evangelicals Now, written as he was approaching retirement, Philip described himself as "quite unashamedly an Anglican Evangelical, with a stress on the noun". He regarded the greatest privilege of more than 40 years ministry "to have been a parish minister in St Helens, Edinburgh and Sheffield", adding that "there is no greater joy than expounding the Word of God week by week in the local church, and to share in people's homes something of their joys and sorrows".

At the Sunday evening service on 29 December 2013 at Christ Church Fulwood, Philip gave his last sermon announcing that he was "calling it a day for all preaching". The sermon was based on 1 John 4 ^{7-21} 'God is Love'.

== Personal life and death ==
Hacking was a keen supporter of Sheffield Wednesday football club. He was present at the disaster in the Hillsborough soccer stadium in April 1989 in which 96 spectators were crushed to death. He was also a follower of English cricket, and in earlier years played cricket at "various unambitious levels".

He married his wife Margaret in 1955 at the Church of the Saviour, Blackburn. They have two children, five grandchildren and six great grandchildren. Their son, Stuart, is also an Anglican minister as well as being school chaplain at Immanuel Community College, Bradford. Their home is in Fulwood, a suburb of Sheffield.

Hacking died on 3 December 2024, at the age of 93.

== List of books ==
- The Spirit Is Among Us: Personal Renewal and the Local Church, Marshall Pickering, 1987. ISBN 978-0-551-01421-3
- What He Says, Where He Sends, Marshall Pickering, 1988. ISBN 978-0-551-01634-7
- Real Science, Real Faith, Monarch Books, 1991 (co-authored with R. J. Berry). ISBN 978-1-85424-125-2
- Isaiah: Free to Suffer and to Serve (Baker Bible Guides), Crossway Books, 1994. ISBN 978-1-85684-082-8
- Discovering Isaiah: Free to Suffer and to Serve (Crossway Bible Guides), IVP/Crossway Books, 2001. ISBN 978-1-85684-203-7
- The Rhythm of the Gospel: 2 Corinthians (Authentic Lifestyle Guides), Authentic Media, 2004 (co-authored with Elizabeth McQuoid). ISBN 978-1-85078-573-6
- Opening Up Hebrews (Opening up the Bible series), Day One Publications, 2006. ISBN 978-1-84625-042-2
