= Japan Evangelistic Band =

Evangelical Christian group founded in England in 1903

- Founded: 1903
- Founder: Barclay Fowell Buxton and Paget Wilkes
- Origins: Keswick Convention, England
- Region served: Japan

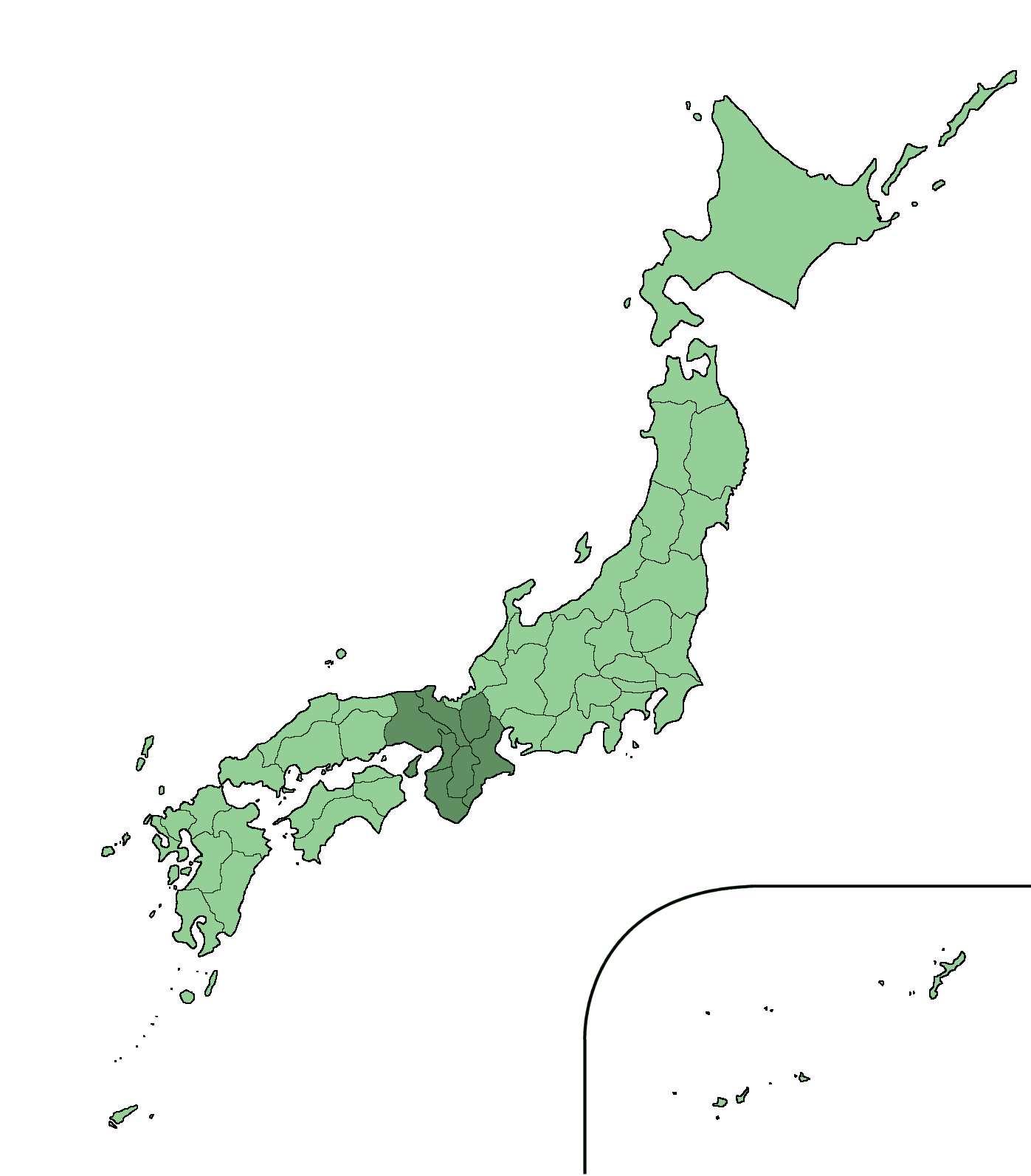
Kansai region, Japan with Shikoku Island off shore

The Japan Evangelistic Band (JEB), or 'Kyodan Nihon Dendo Tai' (日本伝道隊) in Japanese, is an evangelical Christian group founded in England in 1903 with the original aim to "initiate and sustain evangelistic work among Japanese wherever they are found". Within thirty years the organisation grew to 180 workers from many countries, but most of them from Japan. The JEB's primary field was the Kansai region of South West Japan and the island of Shikoku but missionaries worked among Japanese living on the West Coast of Canada and the USA, and in the UK. In 1999 the organisation in the UK adopted the name Japan Christian Link for their operations in the UK, while work in Japan continue under the name of JEB.

== Foundation ==
The JEB was founded by the Rev. Barclay Fowell Buxton and Paget Wilkes at the Keswick Convention in 1903 as an evangelising agency to assist existing missions and churches and to organise Christian Conventions for Bible Study and Prayer. Buxton had been an independent missionary in Japan with the British Church Missionary Society since 1890 and had invited Wilkes to join him as a lay helper there in 1897. They worked together at Matsue in Western Japan, before returning to England. Buxton and Wilkes were joined by a small group of friends at the Keswick Convention who shared their concern for evangelism. The group included Thomas Hogben, who had founded the One by One Working Band, a group devoted to personal evangelism. Initially the new mission was known as the One by One Band of Japan, being dedicated to personal holiness and aggressive evangelism. Nine months later, the name was changed to Japan Evangelistic Band.

Wilkes imagined "a band of men ... who detaching themselves from the responsibilities and entanglements of ecclesiastical organisation, would give themselves to prayer and ministry of the Word...". The JEB was set up as a non-denominational fellowship of Japanese and expatriate missionaries who came from North America, South Africa and Australia as well as the British Isles.

== Growth ==
In October 1903, Wilkes led the first missionary party to Japan, serving briefly in Yokohama and Tokyo, before moving to Kobe, which became the centre of JEB activity. In 1905 the Kobe Mission Hall and the JEB Kansai Bible College were initiated to train an indigenous ministry to carry on the work in the long term. By the 1920s the JEB decided to launch its own forward outreach work since other missions were then finding their own experts in evangelism and making less use of the JEB. Small teams comprising an overseas missionary with a Japanese worker would participate in pioneer evangelism. They did this in many rural areas as well as in some of the larger towns which had not been exposed to Christian work. Churches were started in about 100 centres and full salvation and missionary literature was printed and circulated. The JEB were anxious to avoid creating another denomination, intending that their churches would be linked with existing Japanese denominational churches. However, the JEB churches conferred and decided they would prefer to be linked in their own denomination. In 1938 many of them withdrew from the denominations they had joined and formed a separate denomination called the Nihon Iesu Kirisuto Kyokwai (NIKK) or Japan Church of Christ.

World War II and other factors held back progress, but some Japanese members were able to continue limited evangelistic activities during the war. A bombing raid in 1945 destroyed both the Mission Hall in Kobe and the Kansai Bible College, although both were later rebuilt. JEB missionaries returned to Japan in late 1947 and started work on the new housing estates that were growing up on the outskirts of cities. Irene Webster Smith opened up a centre for students in Tokyo. In the 1950s new outreach programmes went into Wakayama Prefecture, first to Susami and Kushimoto in the far south, then to Minoshima and Kainan and later to Kozagawa. Other programmes were to Shikoku Island where work began in Tokushima Prefecture at Tachitana then in Hanoura and Naruto. A separate venture was begun in Shido, Kagawa Prefecture and work also started in Wajiki. Churches were established in Tachitana and Naruto. There was another outreach in the 1950s to Northern Hyogo Prefecture and then over the prefectural boundary into Kyoto Fu, where work began in the mountainous districts around Amano Hashidate.

In the UK, JEB members worked among Japanese seamen arriving at the docks in Birkenhead. Conventions were held regularly at the Hayes Conference Centre at Swanwick, Derbyshire in June, and at Southbourne, Dorset in August. From its early days the JEB was actively working with children. There was a Young People's Branch of the JEB called the "Sunrise Band" it was renamed the "Japan Sunrise Fellowship" in 1977.

== Organisation ==
Barclay Buxton was the first Chairman of British Home Council the parent body of the JEB, and he was succeeded by his son Godfrey Buxton. Eric William Gosden became Chairman in the late 1970s. Among the subsidiaries reporting to the British Home Council were Regional Committees, the Japan Christian Union, Seamen's Work in Birkenhead, and the Sunrise Band Committee. In 1947 the British Home Council appointed a Publications Committee to 'co-opt, plan, produce and supervise all publications of the JEB and the Sunrise Band'. From September 1955 this committee was known as the Literature Committee. In the early years, the JEB had its British office at 55 Gower Street, London. In May 1962, it purchased property at 26 Woodside Park Road, North Finchley, London as the British headquarters and office. This property was sold in 1983, and the JEB bought new headquarters at 275 London Road, North End, Portsmouth. In 1999 the renamed Japan Christian Link refocused its work on expatriate Japanese, mainly in Europe.

The Japan Council directed work in Japan. There was always a majority of Japanese members, usually five Japanese with three expatriates. Work in Japan continues to be known as the JEB, and is now under the direction of Japanese workers.

== Archives ==
The archives of Japan Evangelistic Band are maintained by SOAS Special Collections.

== See also ==
- Christianity in Japan
