= Avary William Holmes Forbes =

Avary William Holmes Forbes (1853–1938) was a religious philosopher, teacher, and writer.

Forbes received his MA from Trinity College, Dublin, and then studied law at Lincoln's Inn in London. He joined the Council of the interdenominational All Nations Missionary Union, founded by F. B. Meyer along with the All Nations Bible College. Forbes lectured on church history and theological topics.

He came into conflict over one of the articles in the "Doctrinal Basis" all teachers were required to sign: "We believe in the eternal punishment of those who have ignored or rejected the offer of salvation". In 1936, the same year one of his pamphlets, "The Last Enemy" appeared, he resigned; in "The Last Enemy", he denounced the "eternal torment" doctrine, saying it was "derogatory to God’s character" because it posited "infinite torture for finite sin". His interpretation had been reviewed by theologians including Samuel H. Wilkinson; Wilkinson said Forbes's arguments were "in harmony with the 'Supreme Authority'".

He is the author of The Science of Beauty: An Analytical Inquiry Into the Laws of Æsthetics (1881), summarized thus: "A revival of physiognomy as evolutionary utilitarianism; Forbes lays it down as a law that ugliness consists of subjective disgust and an objective 'suggestion of inutility'(157)".
