= Peter Adam (minister) =

Australian Christian minister

Peter James Adam OAM (born 1946) is a retired Australian Anglican priest. He served as vicar of St Jude's Church in Carlton, Melbourne, for 20 years, where he is vicar emeritus; and principal of Ridley College for ten years.

Adam has degrees from King's College London and Durham University. He has served at St George the Martyr Holborn and Durham Cathedral and is a canon of St Paul's Cathedral, Melbourne. He was also previously a lecturer at St John's College, Durham.

Adam is the vice president of the Australian Fellowship of Evangelical Students. He has written a number of books, including Speaking God's Words: A Practical Theology of Preaching (ISBN 1573833223). In 2011, a Festschrift was published in his honour - Serving God's Words: Windows on preaching and ministry (ISBN 9781844745470), which included contributions from Don Carson, Gerald Bray, Peter Jensen, Vaughan Roberts and David Jackman.

Adam was awarded the Medal of the Order of Australia in the 2012 Queen's Birthday Honours for services to theological education and to the Anglican Church of Australia.
