= All Nations Christian College =

Missions college in Hertfordshire

Easneye House
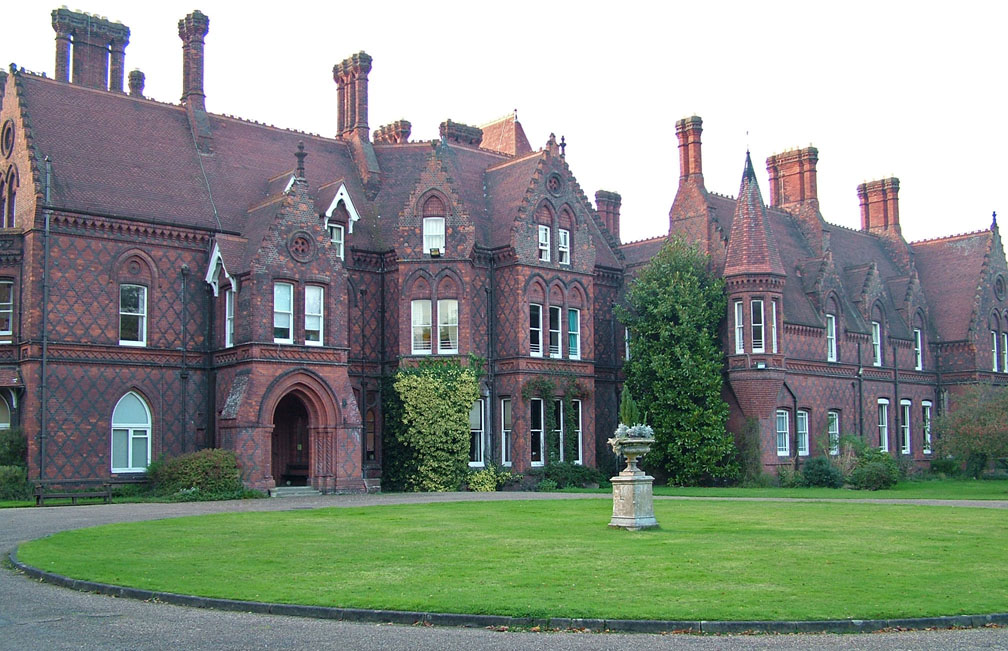

- Location within Hertfordshire

General information
- Architectural style: High Victorian
- Location: Ware, England
- Coordinates: 51.8027°N 0.0007°E
- Construction started: 1867
- Completed: 1868
- Client: Thomas Fowell Buxton

Design and construction
- Architect: Alfred Waterhouse

All Nations Christian College is an English missions college, located at Chester House, Muswell Hill in London and validated by the Open University.

== Aims ==
Unlike some Bible colleges, the focus of All Nations Christian College is primarily missiological – that is, it is focused on training people for cross-cultural Christian mission service anywhere in the world, in Britain or overseas. The bachelor's degree course offered by the college is in "Biblical and Intercultural Studies", representing the division in the syllabus between personal development, biblical, and intercultural elements of the course.

== History ==
All Nations is the result of the merger in 1971 of three colleges, all of which prepared people to work in cross-cultural missionary service overseas: Mt Hermon Missionary Training College (founded 1911), Ridgelands Bible College (1919), and All Nations Bible College (1923). The last had changed its name to All Nations Missionary College in 1962, just prior to moving from Taplow, in Buckinghamshire, to Easneye Mansion near Ware in 1964. The first two exclusively trained women, while All Nations Missionary College trained both single men and married couples.

All Nations Missionary College had always maintained cordial relations with the other two colleges, to the extent of sharing council members and faculty at times. In the freer atmosphere brought in by the 1960s it became increasingly evident to the principals of Mt Hermon (Meg Foote) and All Nations (David Morris) that it was time to bring the colleges together and to train men and women, singles and marrieds, in one enlarged institution. Ridgelands College was approached and they readily agreed to be involved with such a vision. (Redcliffe College at Chiswick was also approached but their trustees were not convinced combining was feasible). Despite resistance in some quarters to the idea of a coeducational merger, Morris and Foote persisted, and in 1971 the three colleges merged under the name of All Nations Christian College.

It took some time to decide on a location for the merged college, but, after examination of a wide range of available properties in the Home Counties, the decision was made to buy the Easneye Mansion and 15 acres (6.1 ha) of land, which All Nations Missionary College had used on a rental basis since 1964. This was enlarged and developed with the proceeds from the sale of the other two colleges.

== Easneye Mansion ==
Easneye Mansion had been the family home of the Buxtons since being built by Thomas Fowell Buxton (Jnr) in 1868. Buxton's father, Sir Thomas Fowell Buxton (Snr), had made his fortune (along with Messrs Truman and Hanbury) by brewing and popularising porter (beer), which was considered to be a cheaper, more nutritious and healthier alternative to gin. Sir Thomas was a member of the reformist Clapham Sect and it was to him that the ailing William Wilberforce entrusted the oversight of the Emancipation of Slaves Bill, which Buxton eventually got through Parliament in 1832. This earned him not only a Baronetcy but also the title of "The Liberator". His sister in law was the penal reformer Elizabeth Fry, and Buxton could be seen beside Fry on the back of the previous edition of the English £5 note from 2001 to 2016. Buxton's brewery was successful and eventually enabled his son to buy the estate at Easneye (Anglo-Saxon for water-island) and build the mansion under the direction of the architect Alfred Waterhouse. It is a Grade II* listed building.

As the Buxtons moved into Easneye, Hannah, the wife of Sir Thomas Fowell Buxton Snr, wrote a letter expressing her desire for a dedication service to be held, which contained the prophetic wish: "(May) this house ever be inhabited by faithful servants of God in and through Jesus Christ .. and may this place be a fountain of blessing in the church and in the world". Arthur Buxton (1882–1958) lived here in his youth. During the lifetime of the owner all available family and employees would gather in the Main Hall for morning prayers to be offered on behalf of the estate, the church and the world; and a grandson of Sir Thomas Fowell Buxton Snr, Barclay Fowell Buxton, went as a missionary to Japan, while some of the household servants also went overseas in Christian service. Barclay Fowell Buxton's son, Godfrey Buxton, founded a precursor institution of All Nations Missionary College.

In May 2025, the trustees announced their intention to move from the Easneye campus and the house and grounds have been put up for sale.

== Principals of the college ==
The principals of the college since the 1971 merger have been:

- 1971–1981: David Morris. Meg Foote, principal of Mount Hermon, was vice-principal.
- 1981–1982: Meg Foote (Acting Principal)
- 1982–1985: Dr Ray Windsor
- 1985–1993: Rev Dr David Harley
- 1993–2001: Rev Dr Christopher J. H. Wright
- 2001–2006: Rev Joe Kapolyo
- 2006–2007: Rev Dr Bob Hunt (Senior Tutor and Acting Principal)

Since 2006, the college has restructured its governance. Instead of a principal, the overall directional role of the college is carried by its CEO, and other members of staff serve on the Leadership Team.

- 2006–2015: Mike Wall (CEO)
- 2016–2023: A Dipper (Principal and CEO)
- 2023–present: Rev Dr V J Samkutty (Acting Principal and CEO)

== Facilities ==
The college contains the largest missiological library in Europe, with over 50,000 volumes and 40,000 indexed articles. It subscribes to over 100 periodicals with back issues of a further 200.

The college's student accommodation consists of the original Buxton house (Main House) which contains the married couples' accommodation (the Wainery), plus the former stables and coach house, along with a custom-built accommodation block (Oak House, built in 1971, housing 70 students). The Academic Block was also built in 1971 and contains two large lecture halls as well as tutors' offices. The lecture halls are fitted with induction loops for the hard of hearing.

Wifi is available throughout most of the campus. There is also a games room, and various leisure and sports facilities.

== Courses ==
=== Undergraduate ===
The primary course is Biblical and Intercultural Studies. It is available as a Certificate, Diploma, or BA (Hons) Degree. While a college qualification is internationally recognised by missionary societies, students can choose to be accredited by the Open University.

=== Postgraduate ===
Missiology, Leadership, Contextual Theology, Ecclesiology, Development & Staff Care are available as a PG Certificate, PG Diploma, or MA.

=== Complementary ===
Short courses of ten weeks are available titled En Route, running alongside the regular courses. Additional courses during the breaks include Refresh for Mission for existing missionaries, the International Dance School for artists, and the Islamics Course.

== Sources ==
- Gratton Tetley, The Story of Easneye, written to celebrate the 25th anniversary of the 1971 merger; revised version of a booklet of the same title written by the founding principal, David Morris, in 1976.
- David Harley, Missionary Training – The History of A.N.C.C. and its Predecessors 1911 to 1981, PhD thesis, published 2000 by Boekencentrum, Utrecht University.
