= David Jackman (minister) =

English cleric

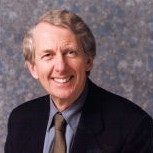
- Born: 10 July 1942 (age 84); Bournemouth, England
- Education: Downing College, Cambridge; Trinity College, Bristol
- Occupation: Bible preacher/trainer
- Website: www.proctrust.org.uk

David Jackman (born 10 July 1942) is a British evangelical speaker, and former president of The Proclamation Trust. He founded the Cornhill Training Course in 1991 and was previously Minister of Above Bar Church, Southampton from 1976 to 1991.

Jackman attended Downing College, Cambridge, and completed his theological training at Trinity College, Bristol, where he studied under J. Alec Motyer and J. I. Packer. Jackman also served with the Universities and Colleges Christian Fellowship (UCCF). In 1974 he wrote his first short book, Starting as a Student: A Christian Approach, an 88-page pocketbook designed to prepare students for University or College life.

He moved to Southampton in 1976 to work as assistant minister of Above Bar Church under Leith Samuel, becoming the Senior Minister in 1980.

After 15 years at Above Bar Church, Jackman was recruited by Dick Lucas to found the Cornhill Training Course in London in 1991. The course is a ministry of The Proclamation Trust, and is designed to train evangelical preachers in exegesis, exposition and communication skills.

In 2004 he became the president of The Proclamation Trust, and is now involved in Trust conferences for preachers and in producing distance learning materials and books. He has also been a speaker at the Keswick Convention and Word Alive. His expository writing work includes commentaries on Judges & Ruth, the Letters of John, and Let’s Study 1 Corinthians.

In addition to his role at The Proclamation Trust, Jackman is a visiting lecturer at Oak Hill Theological College in London as an expert in free church ministry. He is a former chairman of the 9:38 Committee, a national evangelical interdenominational organisation established to help people consider the possibilities of paid gospel ministry.

Jackman is married to Heather, and together they have two grown children.

== Book titles ==
- Jackman, David (2006). Opening Up the Bible. Scripture Union Publishing. ISBN 1-84427-224-9.
- Jackman, David (2006). Spirit of Truth. Christian Focus Publications. ISBN 1-84550-057-1.
- Jackman, David (2004). Judges & Ruth (Communicator's Commentary: Old Testament). Nelson Reference & Electronic Publishing. ISBN 0-7852-4780-7.
- Jackman, David (2004). Let's Study 1 Corinthians. The Banner of Truth Trust. ISBN 0-85151-885-0.
- Jackman, David (2004). Teaching the Christian Hope: Unlocking Biblical Eschatology for the Expositor. Christian Focus Publications. ISBN 1-85792-518-1.
- Jackman, David (2003). Teaching Matthew: Unlocking the Gospel of Matthew for the Expositor. Christian Focus Publications. ISBN 1-85792-877-6.
- Jackman, David (2000). I Believe in the Bible. Hodder & Stoughton Religious. ISBN 0-340-74574-6.
- Jackman, David (1999). Preaching the Living Word. Christian Focus Publications. ISBN 1-85792-312-X.
- Jackman, David (1998). The Authentic Church. Christian Focus Publications. ISBN 1-85792-197-6.
- Jackman, David (1996). Understanding the Church: Getting Your Congregation to Work. Mentor. ISBN 1-85792-257-3.
- Jackman, David (1988). Message of John's Letters: Living in the Love of God (The Bible Speaks Today). Nottingham: Inter-Varsity Press. ISBN 0-85110-782-6.
- Jackman, David (1987). Abraham: Believing God in an Alien World. Nottingham: Inter-Varsity Press. ISBN 0-85110-498-3.
- Jackman, David (1986). Humanity. Scripture Union. ISBN 0-86201-228-7.
- Jackman, David (1974). Starting as a Student: A Christian Approach. Nottingham: Inter-Varsity Press. ISBN 0-85110-374-X.
