= Langham Partnership =

Nonprofit Christian international fellowship

- Founded: 1969 (as Langham Trust)
- Founder: John Stott
- Type: 501(c)(3) religious non-profit corporation in the USA, registered not for profit in other countries
- Purpose: To see the Christian church equipped for mission and growing to maturity in Christ through the ministry of pastors and leaders who believe, teach, and live by the Bible
- Location(s): Australia, Canada, Hong Kong, New Zealand, UK and Ireland, United States
- Region served: The Majority World of Africa, Asia, Latin America, the Caribbean, Eurasia, the Middle East, and Pacific region
- Method: Three integrated ministries: Langham Preaching, Langham Literature, and Langham Scholars
- Key people: Riad Kassis, International Director; Chris Wright, Global Ambassador; Hani Hanna, Director of Langham Literature; Paul Windsor, Director of Langham Preaching; Riad Kassis, Director of Langham Scholars; Jill McGilvray, Chair of the Langham Partnership International Council
- Revenue: US$5 million (2012)
- Website: langham.org

Langham Partnership (formerly known as Langham Partnership International) is a nonprofit Christian international fellowship with purpose stated by its founder John Stott as to see "churches in the Majority World equipped for mission and growing to maturity in Christ through the ministry of pastors and leaders who believe, teach and live by the Word of God". In 2005, TIME magazine named Stott among the 100 most influential people in the world.

== History ==
=== Origin ===
The roots of Langham Partnership extend to 1969 when Evangelical Anglican pastor John Stott had a strong desire to help Christian pastors in non-Western countries (where he was travelling widely) more fully understand the Bible so they could preach its messages more clearly to their own people. "He saw lots of Christians, but not enough teachers; lots of enthusiasm, but not enough erudition." By dedicating the royalties from his (eventually more than 50) published books, Stott first established a fund he named Langham Trust (LT) to finance doctoral scholarships.

In 1971, he founded the Evangelical Literature Trust (ELT) to provide books for students, pastors, and theological libraries in the Majority World. Both of these remained independent charities registered in the UK until, in 2001, Langham Partnership UK & Ireland was registered to amalgamate and replace the former LT and ELT The objectives and work of the two original charities – Langham Scholars and Langham Literature respectively – continue within Langham Partnership.

In 1974 Stott, with a group of friends, launched the Langham Foundation in the US to encourage and enable people there to "help provide the resources needed to raise the standards of biblical preaching worldwide." Around the same time, Langham networks were formed in Australia and Canada to help raise funds to support the ministries for which Stott advocated.

=== Names ===
In 1996, the name was changed in the US to John Stott Ministries. After the death of Stott in 2011 the name was changed in 2012 to Langham Partnership USA.

=== Memorandum ===
In 1999 Stott wrote a lengthy memorandum on the ministries he had founded, proposing that:

1. God wants his church to grow up in maturity (not just in numbers);
2. The church grows through God's Word, and
3. The Word of God comes to people primarily (though not exclusively) through biblical preaching.
4. Therefore, the logical response is to strive to raise the standards of biblical preaching so that the church may grow in maturity and fulfill its mission in the world.

=== Activity: since 2000 ===
In 2002, after Stott had led seminars on biblical preaching in Latin America, Langham Preaching was inaugurated as a distinct third ministry of Langham Partnership alongside Scholars and Literature. The new ministry expanded through a growing network of indigenous leaders and regional coordinators, and by 2013 operated in 70 countries.

In 2004, the first Langham Partnership Regional Consultation was held in Entebbe, Uganda, with representative advisors from around East Africa. Through a series of similar consultations around the world in the following years, regional development spread in 13 major continental regions. Regional coordinators were appointed in Latin America, Central America, Anglophone Africa, Asia, and the Pacific region.

According to David Turner, lay reader at All Souls Church, Langham Place, writing in The Guardian newspaper, Langham Partnership is a "threefold initiative [...] to strengthen the church in the developing world by training preachers, funding doctoral scholarships for the most able theological thinkers, and providing basic, low-cost libraries for pastors." Christianity Today called Langham Partnership "preeminent among the organizations [John Stott] launched." "[Langham Partnership] particularly encourages biblical preaching by offering study books for pastors and libraries, by inspiring biblical preaching movements, and by offering doctoral scholarships for evangelical scholars who will commit to teaching in their home seminaries."

In 2006, the Africa Bible Commentary was published. Langham Literature and SIM were jointly involved in sponsoring this one volume commentary on the whole Bible written entirely by African authors for Africa. Langham has facilitated its translation into French, Portuguese, Swahili, and Malagasy. This publication in Africa has led Langham Literature to facilitate similar major projects for one-volume Bible commentaries in regional languages in Latin America, South Asia, the Middle East, and Eurasia.

Another example of the work of Langham Partnership can be seen in the 2007 Langham Preaching training course on expository biblical preaching taken by 150 pastors in Nigeria. Since that initial event, the Nigerian movement has diversified to many different parts of the country, training thousands of pastors and lay preachers.

In 2008, Langham Partnership merged with the Eastern Europe Literature Advisory Committee (EELAC). EELAC assisted Christian publishers in the former communist countries of Europe. Langham Literature continues that support, but has extended it in the form of publisher development in other parts of the world.

== Influence ==
The International Christian College website of Glasgow, Scotland said "John Stott was not only concerned with the church in the UK [...] A number of international students coming to ICC over the years have been supported by the Langham Partnership, an initiative begun by Stott in 1969 in order to support church leaders from the Global South studying at UK universities. The ultimate aim was the building up of the church globally, with well trained, theologically literate leaders involved in the rapidly growing churches of the Global South."

John Stott was described by church historian David Edwards as "apart from William Temple (who died as Archbishop of Canterbury in 1944) the most influential clergyman in the Church of England during the 20th century." With Langham Partnership and his other works, Stott "is credited with doing more to change the landscape of global evangelicalism in the twentieth century than any other evangelical."
