= Royal Theatrical Support Trust =

The Royal Theatrical Support Trust (RTST) is a British charity that promotes the theatre supports theatre companies. It was founded in 1967.

== Council of Management ==
Currently, all members of the RTST's Council are charity trustees and directors of the RTST for the purposes of charity law and company law respectively. The RTST also has other members who are members for the purposes of company law, but who are not Council members.

As a result of a corporate governance review, and subject to adoption of new Articles of Association at the RTST's 2015 AGM, a new Board of Trustees and a new Council will come into being. The Trustees will be charity trustees and directors for the purposes of charity law and company law respectively. They and all other members of the RTST for the purposes of company law will form the new Council.

The RTST is supported by many of the leading names in British theatre including Sir Ian McKellen, Dame Judi Dench and Sam Mendes. Its chairman is Sir Geoffrey Cass.
