= Christopher J. H. Wright =

Anglican clergyman and Old Testament scholar (born 1947)

Christopher John Hugh Wright (born 1947) is a missiologist, an Anglican clergyman and an Old Testament scholar. He is currently the International Ministries Director of Langham Partnership International. He was the principal of All Nations Christian College. He is an honorary member of All Souls Church, Langham Place in London, UK.

== Life ==
=== Childhood and education ===
Wright was born in Belfast, Northern Ireland, in 1947. His parents were missionaries in Brazil, though Chris as the youngest son was born after they came back at the end of the Second World War. He grew up in Belfast and was nurtured as an Irish Presbyterian. He studied classics at St. Catharine's College, Cambridge in the late 1960s, and then started his career as a high-school teacher in Grosvenor High School, Belfast. As a student, he was active in the CICCU. In the 1970s he studied for his PhD at Cambridge University in Cambridge, England, in the field of Theology, specialising in Old Testament economic ethics; his book from this work was published as God's People in God's Land (Eerdmans and Paternoster).

=== Early professional experience ===
Wright was ordained in the Anglican Church of England in 1977 and served as an assistant pastor in the Parish Church of St. Peter & St. Paul, Tonbridge, Kent, England.

=== Foreign mission service ===
In 1983 Wright moved to India with his wife, Liz, and four children to teach at Union Biblical Seminary (UBS) in Pune for five years. At this time he and Liz were mission partners with Crosslinks, an evangelical Anglican mission agency. While at UBS he taught a variety of Old Testament courses at B.D. and M.Th. levels.

=== All Nations Christian College ===
In 1988 Wright returned to the UK as academic dean at All Nations Christian College, an international training centre for cross-cultural mission. He was appointed principal there in September 1993 and held that post for eight years.

=== Current role ===
In September 2001 Wright was appointed to his present role as the International Ministries Director of the Langham Partnership International (LPI).

Wright and his wife belong to All Souls Church, Langham Place, where he enjoys preaching from time to time as a member of the ministry team. This is also the church where LPI's founder, John Stott, was rector emeritus.

== Personal life ==
Wright enjoys running, birding and watching rugby football. He has a passion to bring to life the relevance of the Old Testament to Christian mission and ethics. He has written several books mostly on that area. He loves preaching and teaching the Bible, which he does now mostly through the Langham Preaching seminars in different parts of the world. When not travelling around the world for this ministry, and giving international leadership to LPI, Chris gives about three months of each year to his continuing writing projects.

Wright and his wife Liz live in London and have four adult children and 11 grandchildren.

He is of no relation to N.T. Wright.

== Written works ==
- User's Guide to the Bible (Lion Manuals), Chariot Victor, 1984
- God's People in God's Land: Family, Land and Property in the Old Testament. Grand Rapids: Eerdmans; Exeter, UK: Paternoster, 1990
- Knowing Jesus through the Old Testament, Harpercollins, 1990
- Tested by Fire. Daniel 1-6: Solid Faith in today’s world, Scripture Union, 1993
- Walking in the Ways of the Lord: The Ethical Authority of the Old Testament, Intervarsity Press, 1995 ISBN 9780830818679
- Deuteronomy (New International Biblical Commentary), Hendrickson, 1996
- The Uniqueness of Jesus. Thinking Clearly Series. Mill Hill, London and Grand Rapids: Monarch. Reprint 2001.
  Available in the United States through Kregel Publications, P.O. Box 2607, Grand Rapids, MI 49501), 1997
- Ambassadors to the World (Declaring God’s Love) Intervarsity Press, 1998
- The Message of Ezekiel (The Bible Speaks Today), Intervarsity Press, 2001 ISBN 9781514006412
- Old Testament Ethics for the People of God. Leicester, England, and Downers Grove, Ill.: Inter-Varsity Press.
  Revised, updated and expanded version of Living as the People of God and An Eye for an Eye, 2004
- The Mission of God: Unlocking the Bible's Grand Narrative, IVP Academic, 2006; second edition 2025 ISBN 9781514000045
- Life Through God's Word: Psalm 119, Milton Keynes, Authentic and Keswick Ministries, 2006
- Knowing the Holy Spirit through the Old Testament, Oxford: Monarch Press; Downers Grove: IVP, 2006
- Knowing God the Father Through the Old Testament, IVP Academic, 2007 ISBN 9780830825912
- Salvation Belongs to Our God: Celebrating the Bible's Central Story, Global Christian Library, Nottingham: IVP;
  Christian Doctrine in Global Perspective, Downers Grove: IVP, 2008
- The God I Don't Understand: Reflections on Tough Questions of Faith, Grand Rapids: Zondervan, 2009 ISBN 9780310530701
- The Mission of God's People (Biblical Theology for Life), Grand Rapids: Zondervan, 2010
- Sweeter than Honey, Langham Preaching Resources, 2015
- Becoming like Jesus, Langham Preaching Resources, 2016
- How to Preach and Teach the Old Testament for All Its Worth, Zondervan Academic, 2016 ISBN 9780310524649
- Let the Gospels Preach the Gospel, Langham Preaching Resources, 2017 ISBN 9781783681426
