= The Doherty Cup =

Tournament information
- Founded: 1881; 144 years ago
- Location: Cambridgeshire; Cambridge; England
- Venue: Cambridge University Lawn Tennis Club

Current champions
- Men's singles: (United States) Sahil Dayal(2025)

The Doherty Cup, also known as Cambridge University Tournament, is men's closed grass court tennis tournament founded in 1881 as the Cambridge University LTC Tournament, and held in Cambridge University Lawn Tennis Club, Cambridge, Cambridgeshire, England.

== History ==
The Cambridge University LTC Tournament was originally founded in the 19th century, and first staged in May 1881, at the Cambridge University Lawn Tennis Club (f.1881), Cambridge, Cambridgeshire, England. This tournament was an open event for students of the University, but closed to other outside players. The first winner of the men's singles was Britain's Barclay Fowell Buxton. the men's event was known as the Doherty Cup from 1920 onward. The 1924 edition was won by Donald Ross Ruttnam who defeated the American player Jimmy Van Alen. In 2021 Michal Kaminski of Poland defeated Krishna Amin of India.

== Finals ==
Incomplete Roll

=== Men's Singles ===
==== Doherty Cup ====
Year	Winner	Runner-up	Score
1881	(England) Barclay Fowell Buxton	(England) Erskine Gerald Watson	?
1885	(England) Herbert Wilberforce	(England) J.S. Burton	6-3 5-7 6-3 6-3
1888	(United Kingdom) Clement Cazalet	(United Kingdom) Alfred E. Walker	2-6 6-1 6-2 5-7 6-1
1903	(New Zealand) Anthony Wilding	(United Kingdom) Richard Prescott Keigwin	6-0 6-0
1919	(India) Cotah Ramaswami	?	?
1924	(United Kingdom) Donald Ross Ruttnam	(United States) Jimmy Van Alen	
2017	(Poland) Michal Kaminski	(United Kingdom) James Shemilt	
2021	(Poland) Michal Kaminski	(India) Krishna Amin	
2024	(United Kingdom) Ruben Francis	(Norway) Magnus Hellebust Haaland	6-1 6-2
2025	(United States) Sahil Dayal	(United Kingdom) Harry Cookson	3-6 6-3 10-5
