= Redcliffe College =

Former theological college in England

Coordinates: 51.867236°N 2.248173°W

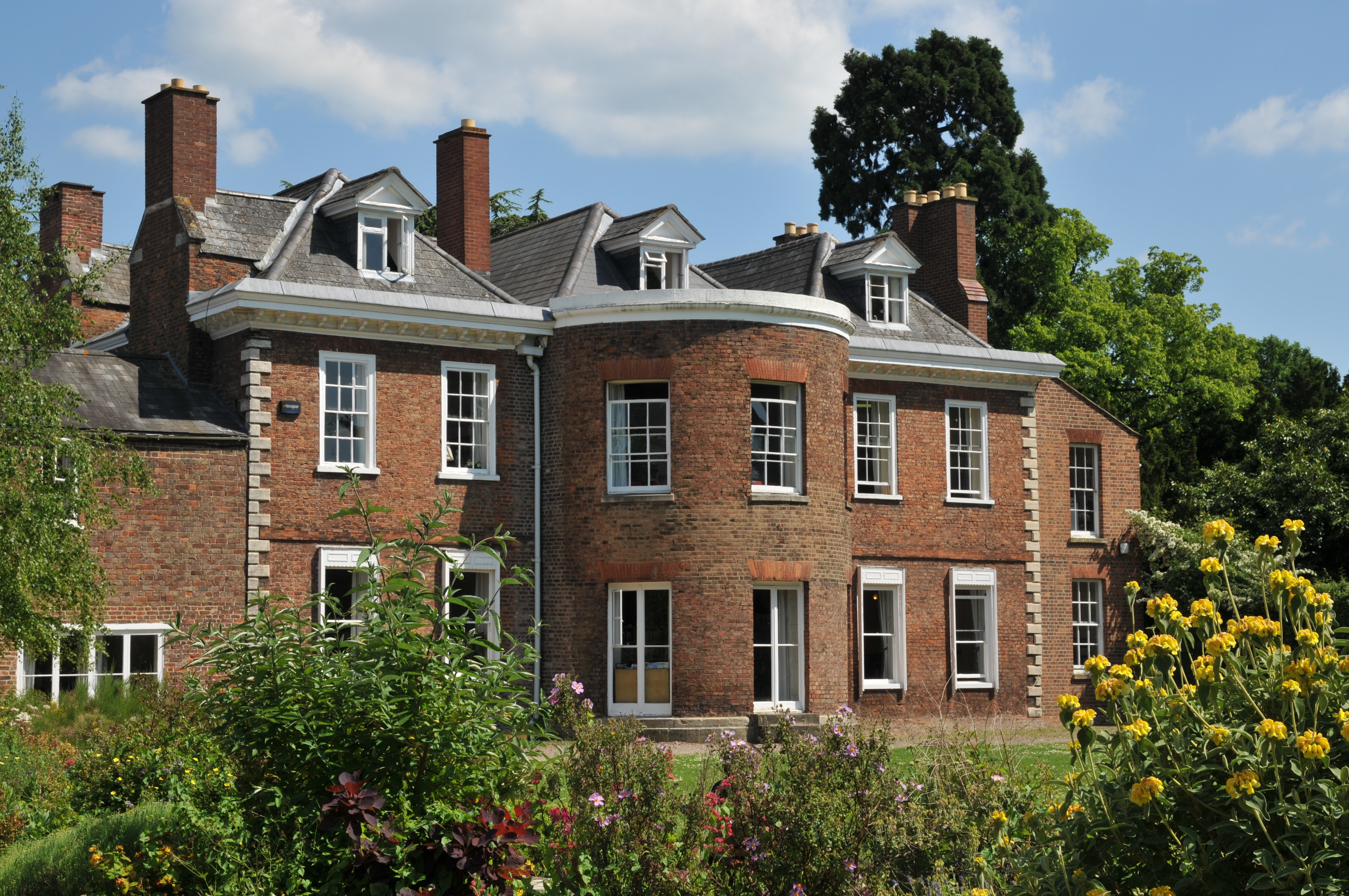
The Redcliffe College campus at Wotton House, 1995-2016

Redcliffe College was a mission training centre and theological college based in Gloucester, England, specialising in training men, women and families working in Christian mission and ministry anywhere in the world. In July 2020 it was announced that Redcliffe would be merging with All Nations Christian College, a similarly positioned mission training college based in Ware, Hertfordshire, north of London. Redcliffe was international and interdenominational, and is a member of the Evangelical Alliance and Global Connections. Redcliffe College had completed its merger with All Nations by September 2020.

== History ==
Redcliffe College was founded on 5 April 1892 as the YWCA Testing and Training Home. Originally based at 495 Kings Road, Chelsea, in 1896 497 Kings Road was purchased and a door was made between the two houses. Redcliffe was the first institution to provide missionary service training for women. In 1917 the college moved to 66 Redcliffe Gardens, Kensington. In 1931 the college moved again to 66 Grove Park Road, Chiswick where it remained until 1995. During the Second World War, the War Office took over the college for use by the Women's Auxiliary Air Force while the students moved to Lancashire, Upper Norwood, and Feering. They returned to Chiswick in 1944. In 1984, the college became co-educational, allowing men as well as women to enrol. In 1995 the college relocated to Wotton House in Gloucester, where it began delivering courses in collaboration with the University of Gloucestershire, offering undergraduate and postgraduate degree programmes. In partnership with Wycliffe Bible Translators and SIL International, Redcliffe established the Centre for Linguistics, Translation and Literacy in 2013, providing specialist training for field workers in this area; this continued until July 2019. In 2015, the college embarked on a new era, discontinuing its undergraduate programme to focusing on providing continuing professional development for Christian ministry, mission and development workers. Selling its Wotton House site in early 2016, Redcliffe moved to the grounds of Gloucester Cathedral, where it delivers blended learning postgraduate programmes. Redcliffe also has hubs in Asia and Oceania where it delivers the MAs in Leadership and Member Care.

== Approach ==
Redcliffe's ethos and course design is based on providing continuing professional development (also described variously as continuing vocational development or continuing ministry development) to those in active Christian mission, ministry or third-sector global development work. Redcliffe has a specific focus on cross-cultural training, noting that the majority of students are involved in work that requires significant cross-cultural skills, as they work with and across multicultural and cross-cultural boundaries. Core programmes are designed to be studied part-time and with blended delivery, in order to ensure that students remain effective on-the-job practitioners while they study, critically engaging with their practice and experience, as well as their theory.

== Courses ==
Each course at Redcliffe comprises a range of modules including topics in biblical, theological, cross-cultural and missional studies. Current courses available include:

=== Postgraduate courses ===
- Postgraduate MA in Contemporary Missiology; can recognise a specialism in:
  - Bible and Mission
  - European Mission
  - Justice, Advocacy and Reconciliation
  - Scripture Engagement
- Postgraduate MA in leadership in a Complex World
- Postgraduate MA in Member Care

=== Week-long courses ===
- Time to Lead

=== University accreditation ===
All of Redcliffe's courses (except short course options) are validated by the University of Gloucestershire, and the college is accredited by the British Accreditation Council. In-keeping with its focus on continuing professional development, modules are available to auditing students on a non-validated basis, and postgraduate degree programmes can be completed over a period of between two and four years.

== Organisations based at Redcliffe College ==
- Centre for the Study of Bible and Mission
- Global Leadership Initiative
- Encounters Mission Ezine - a topical mission journal published online every three months
- Vista - a quarterly online research bulletin communicating research and innovation in mission in Europe
