= Geoffrey Cass =

Sir Geoffrey Arthur Cass (born 11 August 1932) MA (Oxford), MA (Cambridge), CCMI, HonFInstD. Chairman of the Royal Theatrical Support Trust. Spent twenty years as chief executive of Cambridge University Press and has also been chairman of the Royal Shakespeare Company and president of the Lawn Tennis Association.

== Education ==
Sir Geoffrey was educated at Reid Street Infants School, Darlington, at Queen Elizabeth Grammar School, Darlington (Head of School), and later at Jesus College, Oxford, and at Nuffield College, Oxford.

== Career and honours ==
Sir Geoffrey was commissioned in the RAFVR in 1954, and in the RAF 1958-60 (Flying Officer). He was an operating consultant with PA Management Consultants between 1960 and 1965, and chief executive of George Allen & Unwin Ltd, publishers between 1967-71. He was chief executive of Cambridge University Press from 1972 to 1992, and Cambridge University Printer. Chairman of the Royal Shakespeare Company from 1985 to 2000 and then deputy president (to the Prince of Wales) from 2000 to 2011, then emeritus chairman 2011 to present. He was chairman (and co-founder) of the Royal Shakespeare Theatre Trust 1983-2012. He was president and chairman of the Council of the Lawn Tennis Association from 1997 to 1999, and chairman of the British Tennis Foundation from 2003 to 2007 and then President.

Formerly, Sir Geoffrey was also a member of the Cambridge University Fitzwilliam Museum Syndicate; a member of the University Careers Service Syndicate (The Appointments Board); chairman of the governors of The Perse School for Girls, Cambridge 1978-88; president, Macmillan Cancer Support, Cambridgeshire (1998-). He held directorships of Controls & Communications Ltd, Weidenfeld Publishers Ltd, Chicago University Press, American Friends of the Royal Shakespeare Company, Cambridge Arts Theatre, Method and Madness, Cambridge Theatre Company, the Theatres Trust, Marc Sinden Productions, Newcastle Theatre Royal, All England LTC (Wimbledon), and All England Lawn Tennis Ground PLC.

Sir Geoffrey is a Fellow of Clare Hall, Cambridge and a member of Jesus College, Cambridge. He was the longest-serving trustee of the Cambridge University Foundation and was chairman of the audit committee. He was chairman of the Cambridge University ADC Theatre Appeal (2000-2007) and of the University Sports Centre Appeal (2001-2003). He is a life trustee of the Shakespeare Birthplace Trust and a member of the Trust Council, and formerly chairman of the audit committee. He is the chairman and co-founder of the Royal Theatrical Support Trust (2012-) and a vice patron of the Almshouse Association (2018-).

He was knighted in 1992, elected an Honorary Fellow of Jesus College, Oxford in 1998 and awarded a French Knighthood Chevalier des Arts et des Lettres in 1982.

== Sporting achievement ==
Sir Geoffrey was a lawn tennis Blue at Oxford University (1953/54/55) and Captain of Badminton (1951/52). He was tennis Singles Champion of Durham County (1951) and later of Cambridgeshire County in 1976. A Wimbledon Championships player in 1954,1955, 1956 and 1959, he played the opening match of the 1954 Championships on the Centre Court against the then reigning Wimbledon Champion. He went on to play in the Inter-County Lawn Tennis Championships over a period of 31 years and was Captain (1974–78) and President (1980-82) of Cambridgeshire Lawn Tennis Association, having also earlier represented the RAF in the Inter-Services Championships at Wimbledon 1958/59. He was British Veterans' Singles Champion at Wimbledon in 1978, and Captain and first-ranked player in Britain's International Veterans Dubler Cup team 1978/79 at Barcelona and Milano Marittima.

Sir Geoffrey was a member of the Wimbledon Championships Management Committee for 12 years, and Chairman of the Championships Finance Committee. He is currently the president of Cambridge University Lawn Tennis Club (and an Honorary Blue 1980-), and was a member of the University Fenner's Management Committee, and was formerly the Chairman of Cambridge University Cricket & Athletic Club Ltd.

== Personal life ==
He married Olwen (Lady Cass MBE, JP, DL) in 1957, and they have four daughters. Lady Cass died in 2026.

== Sources ==
"Geoffrey Cass". Clare Hall Cambridge. 8 August 2022.
