= Frances Whitehead =

British secretary and personal assistant to John Stott (1925 – 2019)

- Born: 27 March 1925
- Died: 1 June 2019 (aged 94)
- Education: Malvern Girls' College
- Known for: "Right hand" of John Stott

Frances Whitehead (27 March 1925 – 1 June 2019) was a British secretary and personal assistant who was the "right hand" of John Stott, the influential Evangelical Anglican clergyman, for 55 years.

== Biography ==
Whitehead was born on 27 March 1925 in Bovey Tracey, Devon, England. Her family had once been very wealthy, with the Whitehead family owning much of Chelsea, London. She was educated at prep school, during which her mother left the family and she was then raised by her father, Captain Claude Whitehead, a decorated World War One veteran. She was then educated at Malvern Girls' College, an all-girls independent boarding school in Great Malvern, Worcestershire. She served as head girl of her school house (Summerside House).

During the Second World War, after leaving school at 18 in 1943, Whitehead worked as a mathematician at the Radar Research and Development Establishment. Her role was as a human computer, working through equations with different variables to calculate how to hide allied aircraft from the enemy during missions. Following the war, she spent time abroad, working in Switzerland and then South Africa. Returning to England, she worked at the BBC under the producer Mary Treadgold from 1951 to 1955. She also assisted at Billy Graham's "Crusades" in London at Harringay Arena in 1954.

Whitehead "came to personal faith in Christ" at a service at All Souls Church, Langham Place, which is adjacent to the BBC's Broadcasting House, on New Year's Day 1953. She joined the staff of All Souls' Church in 1955, and in 1956 was appointed as parish secretary by John Stott, the church's rector. Despite its name, this role was effectively secretary and personal assistant to Stott. As Stott's ministry expanded, Whitehead's role expanded with him. She typed up his handwritten manuscripts, organised his extensive international travel, managed his correspondence and diary, and oversaw each of his endeavours. As one obituary put it, "John Stott and Frances [Whitehead] ran global endeavours on a shoestring". Another began with the simple statement: "John Stott would never have achieved everything he achieved in his 90-year life were it not for one person: Frances Whitehead.". Stott died in 2011, and Whitehead was executor of his will. Having organised his papers and then deposited them in the Lambeth Palace archive, she was finally able to retire in 2012, aged 87.

In 2001, Whitehead was granted a Master of Arts (MA) Lambeth degree by George Carey, the Archbishop of Canterbury. In 2006, a seminary library in San Salvador, El Salvador, was named in her honour.

Whitehead died on 1 June 2019 of heart failure; she was aged 94. Her memorial service was held at All Souls Church, Langham Place, London, on 21 June 2019.

== Sources ==
- Cameron, Julia E. M. (2014). John Stott's Right Hand: The Untold Story of Frances Whitehead. Piquant. ISBN 9781909281288.
