= Cambridge University Lawn Tennis Club =

British lawn tennis association

Coordinates: 52.198888°N 0.132324°E

Cambridge University Lawn Tennis Club was founded in 1881, seven years before the Lawn Tennis Association of Great Britain was founded. Although it is called a 'club', it is actually the lawn tennis association of the whole of the University of Cambridge, representing the university as a whole, the thirty-one colleges, and other institutions which are part of the university.

CULTC is directly affiliated to the Lawn Tennis Association of Great Britain and has a representative on the council and on the board of the association. The president and former chairman of the club, Sir Geoffrey Cass, was president of the Lawn Tennis Association and Chairman of the L.T.A. Council 1997–1999. He is currently president of the British Tennis Foundation.

The university and colleges give considerable support to British tennis by making available their administrative and playing facilities. CULTC regularly arranges for County Week groups to be held on college grounds.

The university's annual fixture list is one of the strongest in Britain. It usually includes matches against many countries, as well as several of Britain's leading lawn tennis clubs; also half-a-dozen universities, and a dozen other clubs and teams. Most of the club's annual fixtures are home matches, which means that in a typical year nearly 30 tennis teams from all over Britain are entertained for a day in Cambridge at Fenner's.

== Famous past and current members ==
Until the Second World War, after which lawn tennis became less of an amateur pursuit, Cambridge Blues won no less than 28 Wimbledon Championships in singles and doubles.

=== Blues ===
Famous Cambridge Lawn Tennis Blues
| Name | College | Degree | Subject | Years played Varsity Match |
|---|---|---|---|---|
| Reginald Doherty | Trinity Hall | | | |
| Jimmy Van Alen | Christ's | | | |
| Max Woosnam | Trinity | | | |
| Laurence Doherty | Trinity Hall | | | |
| Anthony Wilding | Trinity | | Law | |
| Raymond Tuckey | Queens' | | | |
| Bunny Austin | Pembroke | B.A. | History | 1926–1928 |
| John Barrett | St John's | B.A. | History | 1951–1954 |
| Mark Cox | Downing | B.A. | Economics | |

=== Honorary ===
- Sir Geoffrey Cass, Clare Hall —
- Stephen Bourne, Cambridge University Press — Honorary Vice-president
- Professor Sir Roy Calne, Trinity Hall — Honorary Vice-president

== Varsity match ==
=== Overall statistics ===
Men's Varsity Match Results Overview
| | 1881-2013 | 1946-2013 |
|---|---|---|
| Cambridge Victories | 72 | 44 |
| Oxford Victories | 42 | 23 |
| Draws | 9 | - |

Women's Varsity Match Results Overview
| | 1977-2013 |
|---|---|
| Cambridge Victories | 26 |
| Oxford Victories | 13 |

=== Results ===
Cambridge University versus Oxford University Varsity Match results:

| Year | Men's winner | Men's score | Women's winner | Women's score |
|---|---|---|---|---|
| 1905 | Cambridge | 12-6 | | |
| 1906 | Oxford | 4-11 | | |
| 1907 | Oxford | 4-14 | | |
| 1908 | - | - | | |
| 1909 | Oxford | 0-9 | | |
| 1910 | - | - | | |
| 1911 | Cambridge | 11-10 | | |
| 1912 | Cambridge | 14-4 | | |
| 1913 | Cambridge | 15-3 | | |
| 1914 | Cambridge | 15-3 | | |
| 1915 | - | - | | |
| 1916 | - | - | | |
| 1917 | - | - | | |
| 1918 | - | - | | |
| 1919 | Oxford | 7-11 | | |
| 1920 | - | - | | |
| 1921 | - | - | | |
| 1922 | - | - | | |
| 1923 | Cambridge | 12-9 | | |
| 1924 | Oxford | 10-11 | | |
| 1925 | Cambridge | 11-10 | | |
| 1926 | Cambridge | 14-7 | | |
| 1927 | Cambridge | 13-8 | | |
| 1928 | Cambridge | 13-8 | | |
| 1929 | Oxford | 9-12 | | |
| 1930 | Cambridge | 18-3 | | |
| 1931 | Cambridge | 14-2 | | |
| 1932 | Cambridge | 12-4 | | |
| 1933 | Cambridge | 12-9 | | |
| 1934 | Oxford | 8-13 | | |
| 1935 | Cambridge | 13-8 | | |
| 1936 | Oxford | 6-11 | | |
| 1937 | Cambridge | 11-10 | | |
| 1938 | Oxford | 6-15 | | |
| 1939 | Oxford | 7-14 | | |
| 1940 | Cambridge | 11-4 | | |
| 1941 | Cambridge | 8-7 | | |
| 1942 | Cambridge | 10-2 | | |
| 1943 | - | - | | |
| 1944 | Cambridge | 13-2 | | |
| 1945 | Cambridge | 13-2 | | |
| 1946 | Cambridge | 11-9 | | |
| 1947 | Oxford | 1-20 | | |
| 1948 | Oxford | 8-13 | | |
| 1949 | Oxford | 1-14 | | |
| 1950 | Cambridge | 11-9 | | |
| 1951 | Cambridge | 13-7 | | |
| 1952 | Cambridge | 15-6 | | |
| 1953 | Cambridge | 12-9 | | |
| 1954 | Cambridge | 17-4 | | |
| 1955 | Oxford | 10-11 | | |
| 1956 | Oxford | 10-11 | | |
| 1957 | Cambridge | 14-7 | | |
| 1958 | Cambridge | 16-5 | | |
| 1959 | Oxford | 10-11 | | |
| 1960 | Oxford | 8-13 | | |
| 1961 | Oxford | 6-15 | | |
| 1962 | Cambridge | 14-7 | | |
| 1963 | Cambridge | 19-2 | | |
| 1964 | Cambridge | 14-7 | | |
| 1965 | Cambridge | 11-8 | | |
| 1966 | - | - | | |
| 1967 | Cambridge | 14-7 | | |
| 1968 | Cambridge | 13-8 | | |
| 1969 | Cambridge | 17-4 | | |
| 1970 | Cambridge | 11-10 | | |
| 1971 | Cambridge | 11-10 | | |
| 1972 | Oxford | 7.5-13.5 | | |
| 1973 | Oxford | 8-13 | | |
| 1974 | Oxford | 4-17 | | |
| 1975 | Cambridge | 12-2 | | |
| 1976 | Cambridge | 18-3 | | |
| 1977 | Cambridge | 15-6 | | |
| 1978 | Cambridge | 14-7 | | |
| 1979 | Cambridge | 20-1 | | |
| 1980 | Cambridge | 21-0 | | |
| 1981 | Cambridge | 20-1 | | |
| 1982 | Cambridge | 20-1 | | |
| 1983 | Cambridge | 18-3 | | |
| 1984 | Cambridge | 19-2 | | |
| 1985 | Cambridge | 17-4 | Cambridge | 10-5 |
| 1986 | Cambridge | 16-5 | Cambridge | 8-1 |
| 1987 | Cambridge | 14-7 | Cambridge | 9-6 |
| 1988 | Oxford | 8-13 | Oxford | 6-9 |
| 1989 | Oxford | 2-19 | Oxford | 1-14 |
| 1990 | Oxford | 5-16 | Cambridge | 13-2 |
| 1991 | Cambridge | 15-6 | Cambridge | 12-3 |
| 1992 | Oxford | 9-12 | Cambridge | 11-4 |
| 1993 | Oxford | 6-15 | Oxford | 7-8 |
| 1994 | Oxford | 0-21 | Oxford | 3-12 |
| 1995 | Oxford | 3-18 | Oxford | 1-14 |
| 1996 | Oxford | 6-15 | Oxford | 6-15 |
| 1997 | Cambridge | 13-8 | Oxford | 4-11 |
| 1998 | Oxford | 3-18 | Cambridge | 12-3 |
| 1999 | Cambridge | 14-7 | Cambridge | 12-3 |
| 2000 | Cambridge | 12-9 | Cambridge | 13-2 |
| 2001 | Oxford | 5-16 | Cambridge | 8-4 |
| 2002 | Oxford | 7-14 | Oxford | 7-8 |
| 2003 | Cambridge | 12-9 | Cambridge | 10-5 |
| 2004 | Cambridge | 19-2 | Cambridge | 11-4 |
| 2005 | Oxford | 8.5-12.5 | Cambridge | 17-4 |
| 2006 | Cambridge | 11-10 | Cambridge | 14-7 |
| 2007 | Cambridge | 12-9 | Oxford | 8-13 |
| 2008 | Cambridge | 15-6 | Oxford | 10-11 |
| 2009 | Cambridge | 12-9 | Cambridge | 12-9 |
| 2010 | Cambridge | 13-8 | Cambridge | 18-3 |
| 2011 | Cambridge | 12-9 | Cambridge | 18-3 |
| 2012 | Cambridge | 12-9 | Cambridge | 16-5 |
| 2013 | Cambridge | 12-9 | Oxford | 7-14 |
| 2014 | Cambridge | 12-9 | Cambridge | 14-7 |
| 2015 | Oxford | 8-13 | Oxford | 8-13 |
| 2016 | Oxford | 7-11 | Oxford | 10-11 |
| 2017 | Cambridge | 15-6 | Oxford | 5-16 |
| 2018 | Cambridge | 19-2 | Oxford | 5-16 |
| 2019 | Cambridge | 17-4 | Cambridge | 14-7 |
| 2020 | Cambridge | 11-10 | Cambridge | 18-3 |

== The Doherty Cup ==
The original Cambridge University Tournament was founded as the Cambridge University LTC Tournament in 1881. The winners of gentleman's singles event from 1920 was also known as The Doherty Cup.

== See also ==
- List of social activities at the University of Cambridge
