= Christ Church, Fulwood, Sheffield =

Coordinates: 53.365291°N 1.542377°W

Christ Church, Fulwood
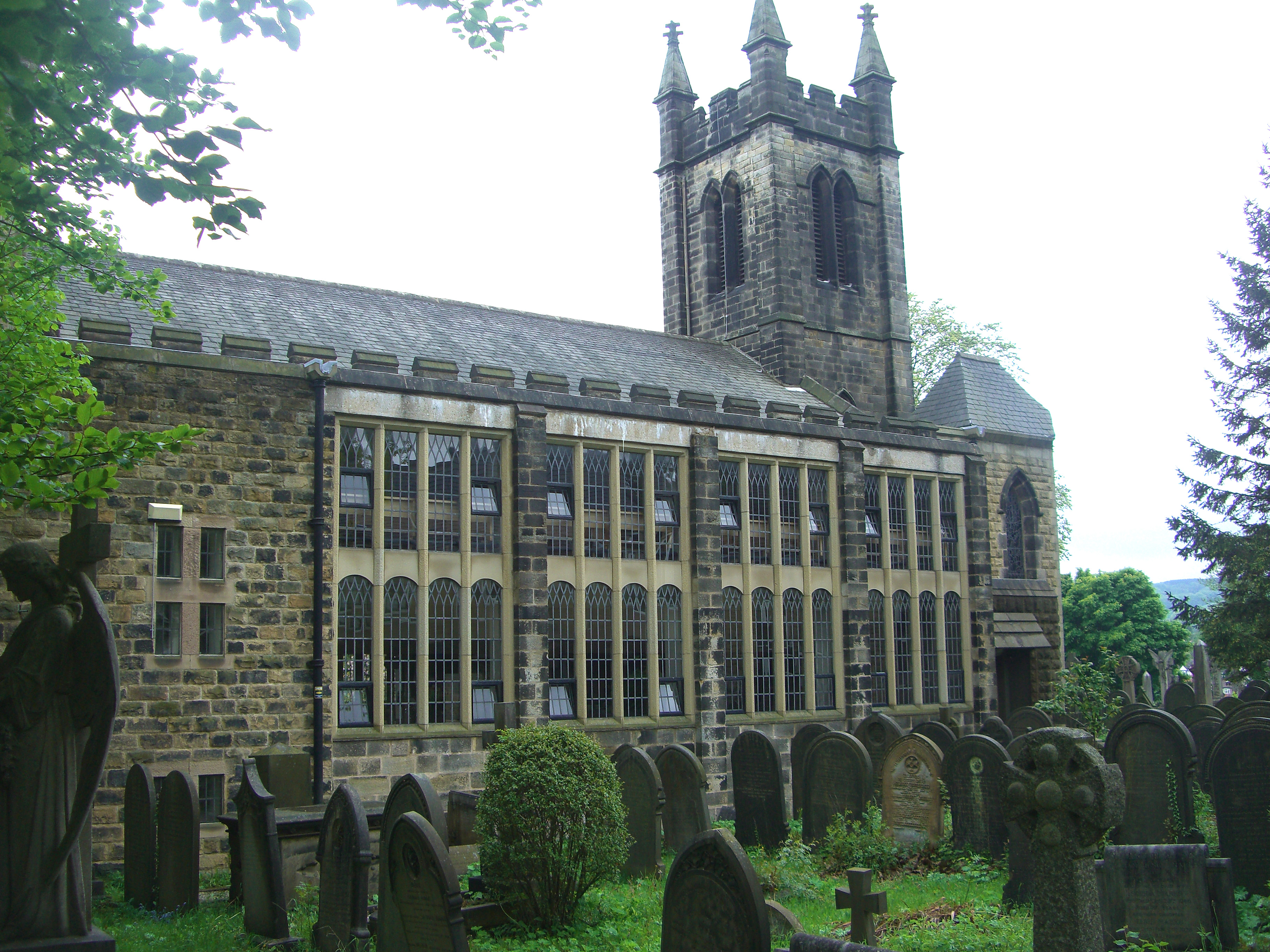

- Location within Sheffield
- OS grid reference: SK 30548 85466
- Location: Sheffield, South Yorkshire
- Country: England
- Denomination: Church of England
- Tradition: Conservative evangelical
- Website: fulwoodchurch.co.uk

Administration
- Diocese: Diocese of Sheffield
- Archdeaconry: Archdeaconry of Sheffield and Rotherham
- Deanery: Hallam

Clergy
- Bishop(s): The Rt Revd Pete Wilcox (Bishop of Sheffield); The Rt Revd Rob Munro (Bishop of Ebbsfleet) (AEO)
- Vicar: The Revd Jonathan William Dyer

Christ Church Fulwood is a large conservative evangelical Anglican parish church of the Church of England situated in Fulwood, Sheffield, England.

== History ==
Christ Church, Fulwood, was built on a piece of land known locally as "Round Stubbing". It was endowed by Phoebe Silcock of Whiteley Wood Hall who donated the land and gave £2,200 for the construction of the church. The transportation of the stone was done gratuitously by local farmers. The first stone was laid on 16 August 1837 by the Reverend W. V. Bagshawe. The Fulwood parish was created in 1839, being the largest in Sheffield covering 19 square miles, taking in large areas of moorland extending out to Stanage Edge and Ringinglow. The church registers date from 1838 for baptisms, 1839 for burials and 1851 for marriages.

The church was originally built by R. Potter. In 1953 a south aisle designed by George Pace was added and the east end and chancel were extended. A new vestry and choir vestry were also added. In 1981 a north aisle, north gallery, rear stairs and turrets were added, designed by Ronald Sims. It became Grade II listed on 28 June 1973.

The land for the first Vicarage in Stumperlowe Lane was again donated by Phoebe Silcock with the cost of construction being covered by public subscription in 1839. Silcock's generosity was remembered in the church's original east window which represented acts of charity. The window was removed during the 1953 enlargement and there is now a copper tablet near the pulpit commemorating Silcock as the foundress of the church.

=== Present ===
The church holds three services on Sundays, at 9 am, 11 am and 6:30 pm. During the morning services, provision is made for children and youth of all ages. All services welcome students and newcomers, including internationals. Students meet midweek for Bible studies at "Students at 7", which takes place each week during term time. A large number of the congregation also meet midweek in homes for small group Bible study.

Many regular activities also take place throughout the week including baby and toddler groups, children's and youth clubs, bereavement care, courses to enable the exploration of the Christian faith (e.g. Christianity Explored, Hope Explored courses) and a "Friday Club" lunch for older members of the community.

Christ Church Fulwood's most popular annual event is the Carols by Candlelight services held each December.

Christ Church is within the conservative evangelical tradition of the Church of England. The Parochial Church Council has resolved, under the provisions contained within legislation relating to the consecration of women bishops, to seek the episcopal ministry of the Bishop of Ebbsfleet (The Rt Revd Rob Munro) under the delegated authority of the Bishop of Sheffield (The Rt Revd Pete Wilcox). The theological position of Christ Church Fulwood engenders a commitment to the traditional teaching of the Church of England, including the authority of the scriptures, a complementarian understanding of the roles of men and women in both marriage and church leadership, and a traditional understanding of the biblical stance on expressions of human sexuality and marriage. The parish receives alternative episcopal oversight (AEO) from the Bishop of Ebbsfleet (currently Rob Munro).

== List of vicars ==
- Jonny Dyer (2022–present)
- Paul Williams (2006–2021)
- Hugh Palmer (1997–2005). Until 2020 rector of All Souls Church, Langham Place
- Philip Hacking (1969–1997)
- Ian Douglas-Jones (1963–1969)
- Laurence Philipps "Laurie" Sheath
- Lawrence Christian Peto (1922–1938)
- Henry Brooke Worthington (1916–1922)
- James White Merryweather (1912–1916)
- Edmund "John" Howe Hewlett (1877–1911)
- Edmund Boteler Chalmer (1844–1877)
- Richard Walker (1837-1844)

== See also ==
- List of works by George Pace
