= Avenue St Andrew's United Reformed Church =

Church in Southampton, England

Coordinates: 50°55′16″N 1°24′15″W

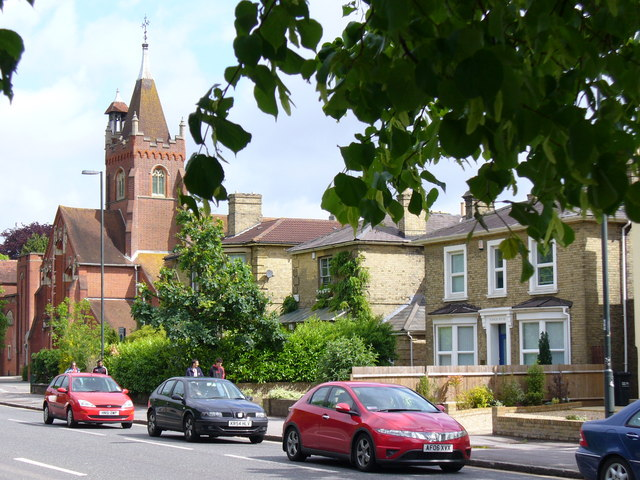
The brick spire and red brick tower are a prominent Southampton landmark

Avenue St. Andrew's is a United Reformed Church in Southampton, England. The church building is listed Grade II on the National Heritage List for England.

== History ==
=== Above Bar Congregational Church ===
The church was founded in 1662 under the ministry of the Rev. Nathaniel Robinson. The father of hymn-writer Isaac Watts (also named Isaac Watts) was a deacon of the church.

The congregation having outgrown the original chapel, a new building was erected on the site in 1727. This was later demolished in 1819 and replaced by an even larger building, the first stone of which was laid on 1 April 1819, and the building was completed on 20 April 1820, having cost nearly £6,000. A re-opening service was held on 6 November 1889.

The Church was the main Non-Conformist church in the city in the nineteenth century, when it was known as Above Bar Independent Chapel (later on becoming Above Bar Congregational Chapel, the oldest church in the Congregational Union). The pastor from 1810 to 1868 was Rev. Thomas Adkins.

On 30 November 1940, during World War II, the church building was destroyed by Luftwaffe bombing. As a result, many of the congregation began attending the nearby St. Andrew's Presbyterian Church. The minister of Above Bar Congregational Church, Rev Maxwell O. Janes, who later became President of the London Missionary Society, also moved to St. Andrew's and was formally recognised as the minister of the latter.

=== St. Andrew's Presbyterian Church ===
St. Andrew's Presbyterian Church was founded in 1853, on the corner of Brunswick Place and Dorset Street. By the 1970s, the congregation had dwindled since much of the surrounding housing had been demolished. In the early 1980s, a survey of the building showed that £150,000 was needed to keep it safe. The decision was made to merge with the nearby Avenue Church since both had become United Reformed Churches following the 1972 merger of the Presbyterian Church of England and many churches within the Congregational Union. The St. Andrew's buildings were subsequently demolished and replaced with offices.

=== Avenue Congregational Church ===
Avenue Congregational Church was opened on Wednesday, 7 December 1898. After the decision to combine the St. Andrew's and Avenue congregations, the church became known as Avenue St. Andrew's.
