= Barclay Fowell Buxton =

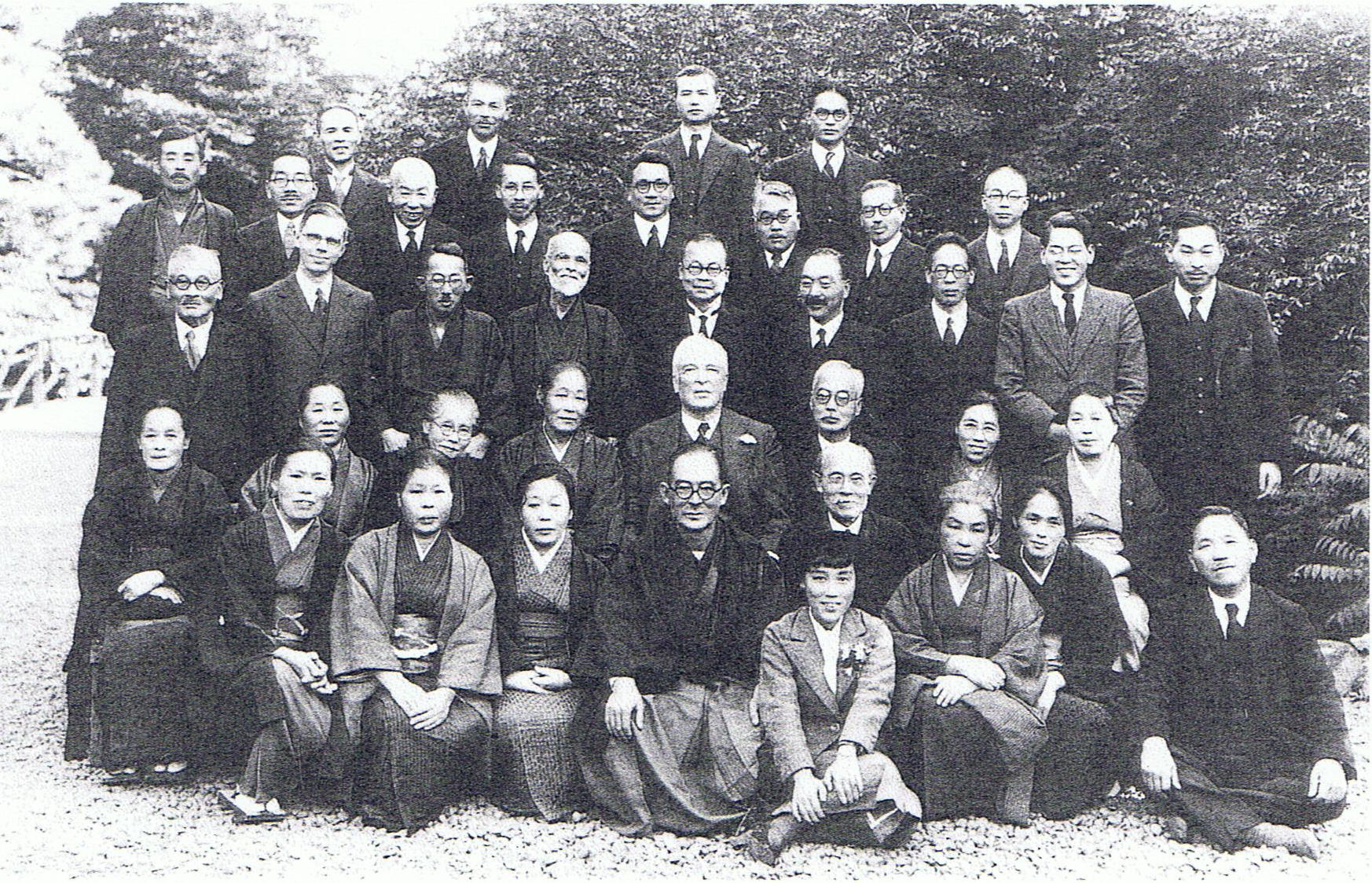
Japan, 1937

Rev. Barclay Fowell Buxton (16 August 1860 – 5 February 1946) was an English evangelical Christian missionary in Japan.

== Biography ==
Buxton was the son of Thomas Fowell Buxton and Rachel Jane Gurney and grandson of Sir Thomas Buxton, 1st Baronet.

Barclay's grandmother was Hannah Gurney, sister to the Quakers Joseph John Gurney and Elizabeth Fry and the name Barclay stems from the Quaker family who founded Barclays Bank. He was educated at Harrow School and Trinity College, Cambridge. He was ordained deacon in 1884 and priest (London) in 1885, From 1884 to 1887, he was curate of Onslow Square, and was then curate of Stanwix, Cumberland until 1889.

In 1890, Buxton went to Japan as an independent missionary with the British Church Missionary Society. Within several weeks of his arrival over 700 people were attending his services and by the end of the first year seven churches had been founded around Matsue and Yonago. He invited Paget Wilkes to join him as a lay helper in 1897, and the two worked together in Western Japan, before returning to England. Together they founded the Japan Evangelistic Band, which was formally launched at the Keswick Convention in 1903, where Buxton and Wilkes were joined by a small group of friends who were interested in evangelism in Japan. At first the new mission was known as the One by One Band of Japan, but nine months after Keswick, the name was changed to Japan Evangelistic Band, (“Kyodan Nihon Dendo Tai”) in Japanese.

Buxton worked with Wilkes in Japan for many years, and returned to England in 1917. He remained Chairman of the JEB until his death. Between 1921 and 1935, he was the Vicar of Tunbridge Wells. In 1937, he received three separate calls to go back to Japan for a last missionary effort at the age of 75. Beginning in Kobe, he spoke 125 times in 153 days in 19 areas of the country.

Buxton married Margaret Maria Amelia Railton, daughter of William Railton, in 1886. They had four children, a daughter Rachel Jane, Godfrey Buxton crippled by a war injury who set up the All Nations missionary training college and succeeded his father at the JEB, Murray Barclay Buxton, and Alfred Barclay Buxton, who joined CT Studd in the Congo and married one of CT's daughters, Edith, and then served as a missionary in Abyssinia. Both Alfred and Murray died together at Church House, Westminster during the London bombings of 1940.

He was an uncle of Arthur Buxton (1882–1958), Chaplain to the Forces and Rector of All Souls Church, Langham Place, Marylebone.

== Sportsman ==
Barclay Fowell Buxton was also a notable amateur tennis player. He played at the 1880 Wimbledon Championships where he lost in the first round, and he won the men's singles title at Cambridge University LTC Tournament in 1881 against Erskine Gerald Watson. In 1882 he took part in the Agricultural Hall Tournament one of the earliest known indoor tennis tournaments, and the prestigious Prince's Club Championships held at the Prince's Club at Hans Place in London.
