= Godfrey Buxton =

English missionary

Barclay Godfrey Buxton MC (7 January 1895 –1986) was a casualty of World War I, who compensated for his inability to follow the family tradition of missionary service by founding and running missionary training colleges.

Buxton was the son of Reverend Barclay Buxton, a missionary who co-founded the Japan Evangelical Band, and Margaret Maria Amelia Railton. He was the great-grandson of Sir Thomas Buxton, 1st Baronet the abolitionist and social reformer. He was educated at Repton School, and Trinity College, Cambridge. In World War I, he fought in the Duke of Wellington's Regiment, gaining the rank of captain. When a shell fell on his billet, he was severely wounded with shrapnel damage to both legs. He was invalided out and walked with two sticks for the rest of his life.

Unable to fulfil his lifelong dream of becoming a missionary himself, he asked his brothers - "What can God do with this bag of bones?" The answer was that if he could not go himself, he should stay behind to train those who could. He took over what was left of Harley College, dissipated due to the war, and, using the post-war Army billets and camps, founded the Missionary Training Colony in 1923, based in Upper Norwood in south-east London. In 1962, the Missionary Training Colony merged with another South London seminary, the All Nations Bible College (formerly the All Nations Missionary Union), to form the All Nations Missionary College and in 1964, Buxton, then a member of the college council, suggested that the college move to the Easneye estate, the Buxton ancestral property. By another merger in 1971 the college became the All Nations Christian College.

After the death of his father in 1946, Buxton succeeded him in his role at the Japanese Evangelical Band as Chairman of the British Home Council, the parent body.

Buxton married Dorothea Reader Harris, younger daughter of Richard Reader Harris, in 1922 and they had a daughter and son.

== Publications ==
- The Reward of Faith
