= Vaughan Roberts =

British clergyman

The Reverend Canon Vaughan Roberts
- Rector of St Ebbe's Church, Oxford
- Church: Church of England
- Diocese: Oxford
- In office: 1998–present
- Predecessor: David Fletcher

Orders
- Ordination: 1991 (deacon); 1992 (priest)

Personal details
- Born: Vaughan Edward Roberts; 17 March 1965 (age 61) Winchester, Hampshire, United Kingdom
- Education: Winchester College
- Alma mater: Selwyn College, Cambridge; Wycliffe Hall, Oxford

Vaughan Edward Roberts (born 17 March 1965) is a Church of England clergyman. Since 1998, he has been the rector of St Ebbe's, Oxford. In 2009, he became Director of the Proclamation Trust.

== Early life ==
Roberts was born on 17 March 1965 in Winchester, Hampshire. He was educated at Winchester College which is an all-boys public school in Winchester.

He studied law at Selwyn College, Cambridge, and graduated from the University of Cambridge with a Bachelor of Arts (BA) degree in 1988; as per tradition, his BA was promoted to a Master of Arts (MA (Cantab)) degree in 1991. In 1987, he was President of the Cambridge Inter-Collegiate Christian Union.

After graduation, he spent a short time in student ministry in South Africa. Roberts then moved to Oxford and in 1989 entered Wycliffe Hall, an Anglican theological college. There, he studied theology and undertook training for ordained ministry.

== Ordained ministry ==
Roberts was ordained in the Church of England as a deacon in 1991 and as a priest in 1992. In 1991, he joined St Ebbe's Church, Oxford, a conservative evangelical church, as a curate under David Fletcher. From 1995 to 1998, he was the Student Pastor with special responsibilities for students and student ministry. In 1998, when Fletcher retired, Roberts was appointed Rector of St Ebbe's.

In October 2021, he was elected a member of the General Synod of the Church of England.

From 2009, Roberts also served as Director of the Proclamation Trust, an evangelical Christian association dedicated to training preachers in expository preaching. He has written a number of Christian books, including Turning Points, Distinctives, Battles Christians Face, True Worship, Life's Big Questions and God's Big Picture (an introduction to Biblical theology).

In July 2024, he was commissioned by the Church of England Evangelical Council as an "overseer" to provide alternative spiritual oversight (not to be confused with the Church of England's official alternative episcopal oversight) to evangelical clergy and parishes in the Church of England who maintain traditional teaching on the doctrine of marriage and sexual ethics, following the General Synod's support for the introduction of a service of blessing for same sex couples.

=== Views ===
In 2017, he was among the initial signatories of the Nashville Statement.

He believes that marriage is between one man and one woman: "marriage of a man and a woman is the Bible's greatest unchanging picture of Christ and his love for the church and is not something we are at liberty to redefine".

== Personal life ==
In the fifth anniversary edition of Battles Christians Face a new preface was added in which Roberts acknowledged struggles with unwanted same-sex attraction. He later publicly confirmed this in an interview, adding that he does not define himself as homosexual. He has chosen to remain celibate.

== Works ==
- Turning Points (1999: Authentic) ISBN 978-1-85078-336-7
- True Worship (2002: Authentic) ISBN 978-1-85078-445-6
- God's Big Picture: Tracing the Storyline of the Bible (2002: Inter-Varsity Press) ISBN 978-0-8308-5364-9
- Life's Big Questions: Six Major Themes Traced Through the Bible (2004: Inter-Varsity Press) ISBN 978-0-8308-5367-0
- God's Big Design: Life as He Intends It To Be (2005: Inter-Varsity Press) ISBN 978-0-8308-3343-6
- Distinctives (2006: Authentic) ISBN 978-1-85078-331-2
- Battles Christians Face (2007: Authentic) ISBN 978-1-85078-728-0
- Christmas in Three Words (2007: Inter-Varsity Press) ISBN 978-1-905564-81-1
- Missing the Point? Finding Our Place in the Turning Points of History (2007: Authentic) ISBN 978-1-85078-763-1
- True Spirituality: The Challenge of 1 Corinthians for the Twenty-First-Century Church (2011: IVP) ISBN 978-1-84474-518-0
- Transgender (2016: The Good Book Company) ISBN 978-1-78498-195-2

=== Co-authored ===
- Workers for the Harvest Field, with Tim Thornborough (2006: The Good Book Company) ISBN 978-1-905564-30-9
