= All Nations Bible College =

Coordinates: 51°31′50″N 0°41′20″W

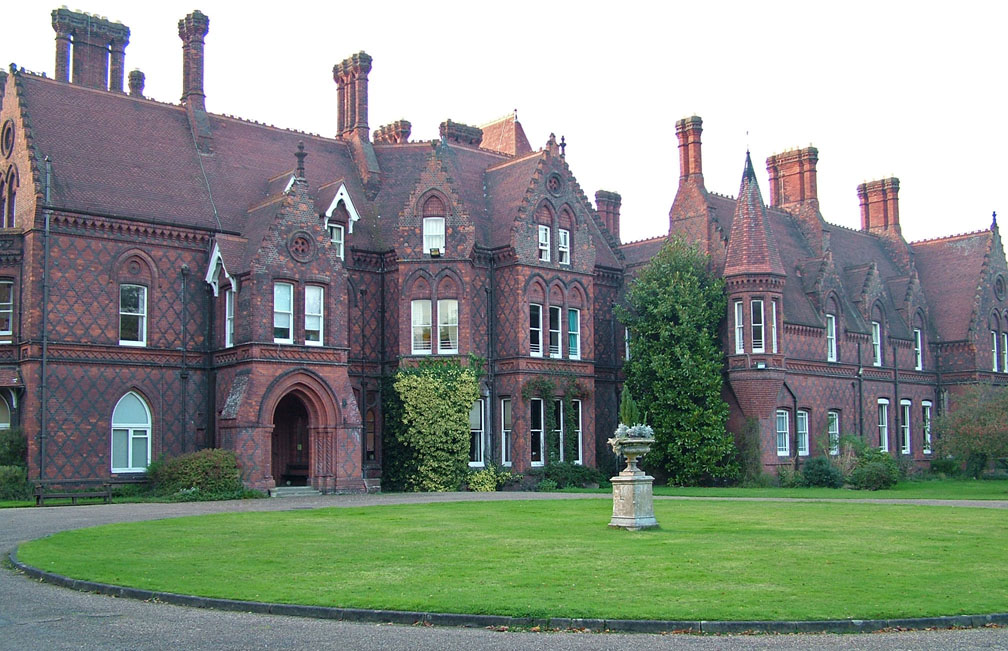
All Nations Missionary College, Easneye

All Nations Bible College was a missionary college in London, founded in 1892. By 1923 it was headed by F. B. Meyer, who also presided over the All Nations Missionary Union. The college trained single men and married couples.

In 1962, the college changed its name to All Nations Missionary College. In 1964, it moved from Taplow, in Buckinghamshire, to Easneye Mansion near Ware. In 1971, the college merged with two other missionary schools to become All Nations Christian College.

The current school can accommodate 100 students in their Easneye Mansion complex, which coincidentally is dissected by the prime meridian line.
