= Roy Clements =

British minister and author

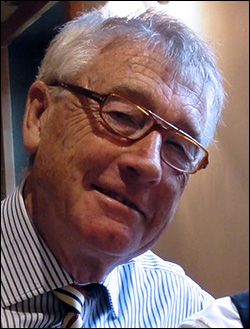
- Born: Roy Clements; April 1946 (age 75); London, England
- Education: University of Nottingham; Imperial College, London; London Bible College
- Occupations: Pastor, preacher, author

Ecclesiastical career
- Religion: Christian
- Church: Baptist
- Congregations: Nairobi Baptist Church, Eden Baptist Church
- Website: www.royclements.net

Roy Clements (born 1946 in London) is a British author and former Christian minister. He was a leading figure within Britain's Evangelical Christian movement for more than two decades until in 1999 he left his wife, resigned from his pastoral ministry and revealed that he is gay.

== Biography ==
Roy Clements grew up in the East End of London and earned a PhD in Chemical Physics, before working for the University Colleges Christian Fellowship in Nairobi and serving as pastor of Nairobi Baptist Church in Kenya. He returned to the UK in 1979 when he became pastor of Eden Baptist Church, Cambridge, where he developed a highly successful ministry to students. Over a period of some twenty years, he gained a reputation within the international Christian movement as an accomplished preacher and teacher. Until 1999 he served on the boards of a number of leading evangelical organisations, including the management council of the Evangelical Alliance, which represents more than a million British Christians across 30 denominations.

In 1999, his ministry within British evangelicalism ended. He had entered a relationship with another man; Chris, a Christian student who had originally sought his help with unwanted same-sex attraction. Clements had planned to leave his pastorate and undertake new career "as a Christian thinker engaged in the public communication of science". He confessed to his wife about his same-sex attraction and she gave him an ultimatum: undergo conversion therapy to cure his homosexuality and cease all contact with gay friends. He suggested that they should try to work on their marriage while he undertook a master's degree. Neither came about, as the Evangelical Alliance published a press release stating that he had left his ministry and marriage to begin a relationship with a man, and multiple stories were followed in the press.

With the uproar, Clements went into hiding. He resigned from his church ministry and left his wife and four children. His funding from a Christian charity for his master's was revoked, and the Inter-Varsity Press had his books withdrawn from sale. He and his wife officially divorced in 2001.

He has now been in a relationship with Chris for more than 20 years, and they entered into a civil partnership in 2015.

== List of works ==
Theology books and biblical commentaries

- A Sting in the Tale (IVP), expositions from the parables of Luke
- Practising Faith in a Pagan World (IVP), expositions from Daniel/Ezekiel
- Masterplan (IVP)
- No Longer Slaves (IVP), expositions from Galatians
- Turning the World Upside Down (IVP), expositions from Acts 1–15
- People Who Made History (IVP), expositions from Judges/Ruth
- Songs of Experience (Focus/Baker), expositions from selected Psalms
- The Strength of Weakness (Focus/Baker), expositions from II Corinthians
- Introducing Jesus (Kingsway), expositions from the Gospel of John
- From Head to Heart (Kingsway), expositions from the First Letter of John
- Word and Spirit (UCCF), an examination of the Bible and the charismatic gift of prophecy
- Turning Points (UCCF), an overview of cultural trends
- Why I Believe (Regent College Publishing)
- Rescue: God's Promise to Save (Focus), with Peter Lewis and Greg Haslam, a short exploration of the five points of Calvinism

Jubilee Centre papers

Clements published a number of papers with Cambridge Papers, a non-profit quarterly publication of the Jubilee Centre, a Cambridge-based centre for contemporary theological reflection which he helped to found. These papers include: "Can Tolerance become the Enemy of Christian Freedom?" (an examination of pluralism in two papers); "Officiously to Keep Alive" (a two-part examination of euthanasia); "Demons and the Mind" (a two-part study of mental illness in the Bible); and "Expository Preaching in a Postmodern World".

== Other references ==
- Roy Clements Archive on the Courage.org.uk website
- Editorial in Guardian (NB may work intermittently)
- Clements's correspondence with Dr John Stott about his theological analysis of homosexuality
- Evangelicals Concerned report of Clements's outing

== See also ==
- Homosexuality and Christianity
