= National Evangelical Anglican Congress =

The National Evangelical Anglican Congress (NEAC) is an infrequent conference for evangelical Anglicans in the Anglican Communion. All congresses to date have been held in England, but have attracted delegates from other countries. They have been notable events which have had significant implications for both the evangelical community and the wider church.

== First Congress ==
The first congress was held in 1967 at Keele University.

== Second Congress ==
The second congress was held in 1977 at the University of Nottingham

== Third Congress ==
The third congress was held in 1988 at Caister.

== Fourth Congress ==
The fourth congress was held in 2003 at Blackpool.
