= Proclamation Trust =

British evangelical Christian training charity

The Proclamation Trust
- Founded: May 1986
- Founder: Dick Lucas
- Type: Charitable organisation
- Registration no.: Registered charity no. 1094952
- Purpose: Training in expository preaching and Bible teaching
- Headquarters: London, England
- Key people: Robin Sydserff (Director)
- Website: www.proctrust.org.uk

The Proclamation Trust is a British evangelical Christian training charity based in London. It provides training and conferences aimed at equipping Christian ministers and lay teachers in expository preaching and Bible handling.

It is best known for running the Cornhill Training Course and the Evangelical Ministry Assembly (EMA).

== History ==
The Proclamation Trust was founded in May 1986 by the Anglican minister Dick Lucas, then rector of St Helen’s Bishopsgate in London.

It developed from a series of preaching conferences held in the early 1980s that sought to promote expository Bible teaching among ministers and students. These conferences led to the establishment of the Evangelical Ministry Assembly, an annual gathering for evangelical church leaders in London.

The Trust was formed to continue and develop this work of training and encouraging Bible teaching in churches.

In 1991, the Cornhill Training Course was established, originally meeting at St Peter-upon-Cornhill in the City of London.

== Activities ==
=== Cornhill Training Course ===
The Cornhill Training Course is a structured training programme for Christian ministry, designed to equip participants in Bible teaching, preaching, and pastoral ministry.

It typically runs over two years and combines classroom teaching, supervised practice talks, and mentoring alongside local church involvement. Students are trained through repeated oral Bible exposition rather than written academic assessment.

The course is designed for those preparing for full-time or part-time Christian ministry, as well as those seeking to develop Bible teaching skills in local church contexts.

=== Evangelical Ministry Assembly ===
The Evangelical Ministry Assembly (EMA) is an annual conference for evangelical ministers and church leaders in the United Kingdom.

It developed from earlier preaching conferences associated with the Trust’s founding context and continues to serve as a gathering for teaching and encouragement in Bible ministry.

== Approach ==
The Proclamation Trust states that its aim is to promote faithful Bible teaching through training, resources, and conferences, with a focus on strengthening local churches.

Academic and ecclesiastical sources describe it as part of a wider conservative evangelical emphasis on expository preaching and structured ministerial training in the United Kingdom.

== Governance ==
The Proclamation Trust is a registered charity in England and Wales and is governed by a board of trustees.

The current director is Robin Sydserff.
