= Word Alive =

- Word Alive is run by Christian Events
- Founded: 22 November 2007; 18 years ago
- Founder: Hugh Palmer, Richard Cunningham, Jason Clarke, Nigel Beynon
- Type: Christian Events is registered as a British charity and a private company, limited by guarantee with no share capital
- Registration no.: 06434440
- Purpose: Providing resources to the church in the UK to help them in their role of reaching out to the world with the Christian Faith.
- Location: London, England
- Origins: Spring Harvest Word Alive (1993 - 2007)
- Region served: United Kingdom / world
- Method: Organising and running the annual conference, Word Alive
- Key people: Rev Hugh Palmer (chair); Rev Richard Cunningham; Jason Clarke; Nigel Beynon (company sec.)
- Revenue: ▲£ 816,343 (2011)
- Website: wordaliveevent.org
- Formerly called: New Word Alive

Word Alive (previously known as New Word Alive (Note: 'New' was first dropped from the name for the 2014 conference)) is an annual conservative evangelical Christian conference which originated through a partnership between the UK Christian organisations UCCF and Keswick Ministries. The conference is focussed on Bible teaching, corporate worship, and family time. The conference is a continuation of the former Word Alive event which ran within Spring Harvest, from which it split in 2007. As well as attracting around 4000 guests, the conference has historically included the largest evangelical student conference in Europe.

== Format ==
Word Alive was billed as "a Bible holiday week inspiring and refreshing the whole body". There was a full adult programme throughout the day along with activities focussed for children and youth. There was also a specially tailored 'Student Track' conference which was one of the largest Christian student conferences in Europe. The Student Track joins the main programme for the morning Bible Readings, the centrepiece of Word Alive, during which the main speaker for the week gave an in-depth bible study.

There were a variety of sessions available throughout the day – Bible studies, seminars, activity groups and worship meetings. Later in the evening there was an 'After Hours' programme featuring contemporary worship, film nights, live interviews, comedy nights, gigs.

The majority of guests stayed in the on-site accommodation (chalets) provided at the holiday centre. There were also Day Visitor and Events Passes available.

== Venue ==
From 2008 to 2011 Word Alive was held at the Haven Holiday Park, Hafan y Mor, near Pwllheli in North Wales. From 2012 the conference moved to the Pontins site, Prestatyn Sands, North Wales.

== History ==
The first Word Alive event took place as part of Spring Harvest in 1993 and was a partnership between UCCF, Keswick Ministries, Spring Harvest and initially the Proclamation Trust. In 2007, it was announced that Word Alive would no longer be a part of Spring Harvest, and from 2008 would run independently (as New Word Alive) in Pwllheli, rather than Skegness. Press releases explaining the split were released by UCCF, Keswick Ministries and Bishop Pete Broadbent of the Spring Harvest leadership team. The statements emphasise different factors leading up to the decision to cease working together. Following a subsequent statement by Pete Broadbent all sides accept that disagreements over Spring Harvest leadership team member Steve Chalke's view of the atonement played at least some part in the split.

From 2008 until 2015 the conference was run over two separate weeks, with different speakers on each. From 2016 onwards Word Alive has been run for a single week only.

The 2024 event was cancelled following Pontins closing the Prestatyn Sands site in November 2023. It was announced in June 2024 that the event would be closed as no suitable site could be found.
