= John Stott =

English Anglican theologian (1921–2011)

The Reverend Dr John Stott CBE
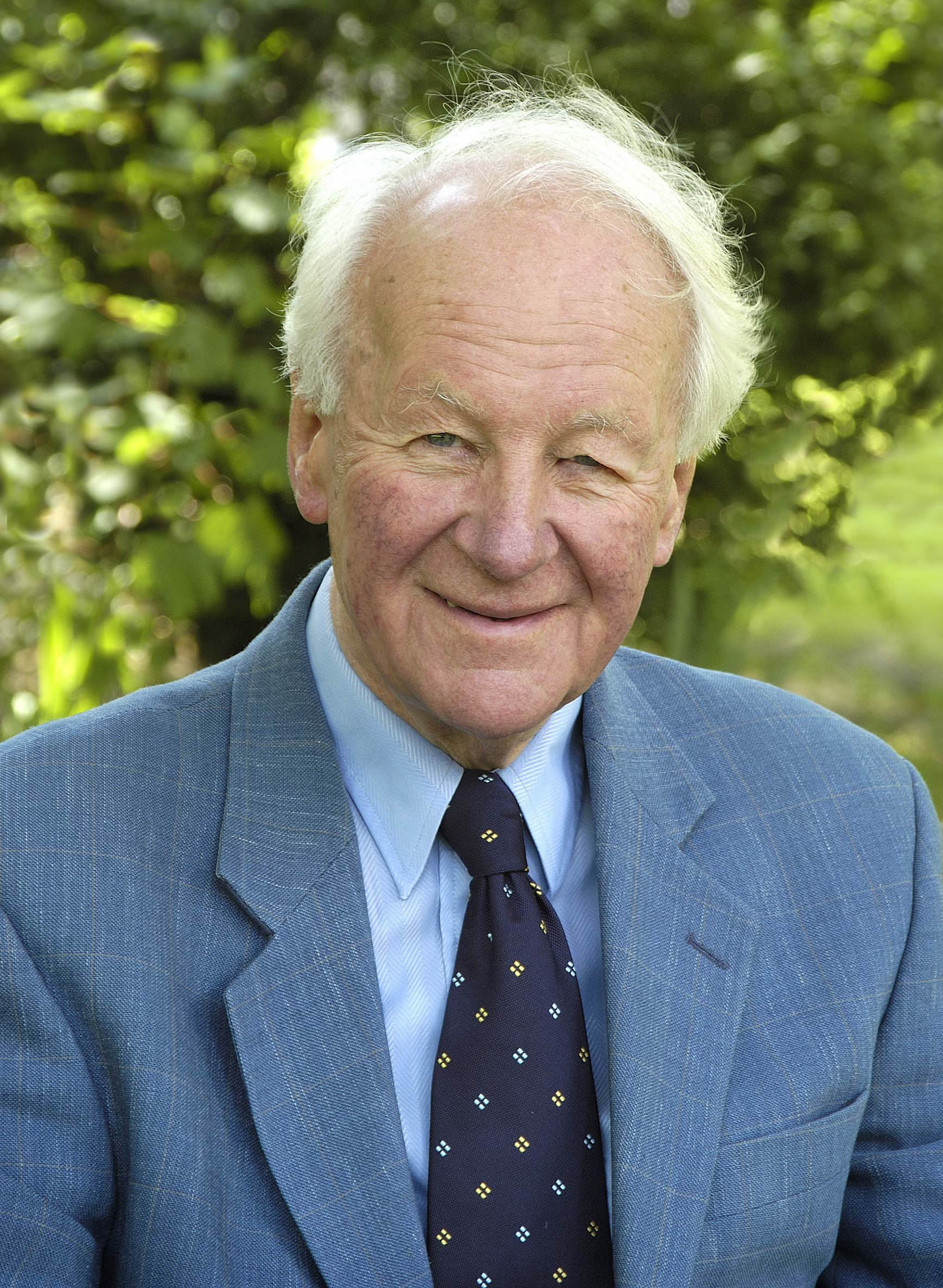
- Born: John Robert Walmsley Stott; 27 April 1921; London, England
- Died: 27 July 2011 (aged 90); Lingfield, Surrey, England
- Education: Trinity College, University of Cambridge (B.A., M.A.); Ridley Hall, Cambridge (M.Th.); Lambeth (D.D.)
- Occupations: Theologian, cleric, author

Ecclesiastical career
- Religion: Christianity (Anglican)
- Church: Church of England
- Ordained: 1945 (deacon); 1946 (priest)
- Congregations: All Souls Church, Langham Place

John Robert Walmsley Stott CBE (27 April 1921 – 27 July 2011) was a British Evangelical Anglican pastor and theologian who was noted as a leader of the worldwide evangelical movement. He was one of the principal authors of the Lausanne Covenant in 1974. In 2005, Time magazine ranked Stott among the 100 most influential people in the world.

== Life ==
=== Early life and education ===
John Robert Walmsley Stott was born on 27 April 1921 in London, England, to Sir Arnold and Emily "Lily" Stott (née Holland). His father was a leading physician at Harley Street and an agnostic, while his mother had been raised Lutheran and attended the nearby Church of England church, All Souls, Langham Place. Stott was sent to boarding schools at eight years old, initially to a prep school, Oakley Hall. In 1935, he went on to Rugby School. While at Rugby School in 1938, Stott heard Eric Nash (nicknamed "Bash"), director of the Iwerne camps, deliver a sermon entitled "What Then Shall I Do with Jesus, Who Is Called the Christ?" After this talk, Nash pointed Stott to Revelation 3:20, "Behold, I stand at the door, and knock: if any man hear my voice, and open the door, I will come in to him, and will sup with him, and he with me." Stott later described the impact this verse had upon him as follows:

Here, then, is the crucial question which we have been leading up to. Have we ever opened our door to Christ? Have we ever invited him in? This was exactly the question which I needed to have put to me. For, intellectually speaking, I had believed in Jesus all my life, on the other side of the door. I had regularly struggled to say my prayers through the key-hole. I had even pushed pennies under the door in a vain attempt to pacify him. I had been baptized, yes and confirmed as well. I went to church, read my Bible, had high ideals, and tried to be good and do good. But all the time, often without realising it, I was holding Christ at arm's length, and keeping him outside. I knew that to open the door might have momentous consequences. I am profoundly grateful to him for enabling me to open the door. Looking back now over more than fifty years, I realise that that simple step has changed the entire direction, course and quality of my life.

Stott was mentored by Nash, who wrote a weekly letter to him, advising him on how to develop and grow in his Christian life, as well as practicalities such as leading the Christian Union at his school.

At this time, also, Stott was a pacifist and a member of the Anglican Pacifist Fellowship. In later life he withdrew from pacifism, adopting a 'just war' stance.

Stott studied modern languages at Trinity College, Cambridge, where he took a double first in French and theology. At university, he was active in the Cambridge Inter-Collegiate Christian Union, where the executive committee considered him too valuable a person to be asked to commit his time to administration by joining the committee. After Trinity he transferred to Ridley Hall Theological College, affiliated to the University of Cambridge, to train for ordination as an Anglican cleric.

He later received a Lambeth Doctorate of Divinity in 1983.

=== Ministry ===
Stott was ordained as a deacon in 1945 and became a curate at All Souls Church, Langham Place (1945–1950), then rector (1950–1975). This was the church in which he had grown up and where he spent almost his whole life apart from a few years spent in Cambridge. In 1956, he appointed Frances Whitehead as his secretary and the pair remained as a working partnership until his death, with "Auntie Frances" as the right hand to "Uncle John". While rector he became increasingly influential nationally and internationally, most notably being an important participant in the 1966–1967 dispute about the appropriateness of evangelicals remaining in the Church of England. He had founded the Church of England Evangelical Council (CEEC) in 1960 to bring together the different strands of evangelicals. In 1970, in response to increasing demands on his time from outside the All Souls congregation, he appointed a vicar of All Souls, to enable him to work on other projects. In 1975 Stott resigned as rector and Michael Baughen, the then vicar, was appointed in his place; Stott remained at the church and was appointed rector emeritus.

In 1969, he founded Langham Trust, (Note: Called John Stott Ministries in the U.S. from 1969 to 2012; renamed in 2012 to Langham Partnership) and in 1982 the London Institute for Contemporary Christianity of which he remained honorary president until his death. During his presidency he gathered together leading evangelical intellectuals to shape courses and programmes communicating the Christian faith into a secular context. He was regularly accompanied by a leading paediatrician, John Wyatt, and the institute director, the broadcaster Elaine Storkey, when they spoke across the country to large audiences on "Matters of Life and Death". Following his chairmanship of the second National Evangelical Anglican Congress in April 1977, the Nottingham statement was published which said, "Seeing ourselves and Roman Catholics as fellow-Christians, we repent of attitudes that have seemed to deny it." This aroused controversy amongst some evangelicals at the time.

=== Retirement and death ===
Stott announced his retirement from public ministry in April 2007 at the age of 86. He took up residence in the College of St Barnabas, Lingfield, Surrey, a retirement community for Anglican clergy but remained as rector emeritus of All Souls Church.

Stott died on 27 July 2011 at the College of St Barnabas in Lingfield at 3:15 pm local time. He was surrounded by family and close friends and they were reading the Bible and listening to Handel's Messiah when he peacefully died. An obituary in Christianity Today reported that his death was due to age-related complications and that he had been in discomfort for several weeks. The obituary described him as "An architect of 20th-century evangelicalism [who] shaped the faith of a generation." His status was such that his death was reported in the mainstream media. The BBC referred to him as someone who could "explain complex theology in a way lay people could easily understand". Obituaries were published in The Daily Telegraph and The New York Times.

The American evangelist Billy Graham released a statement saying, "The evangelical world has lost one of its greatest spokesmen, and I have lost one of my close personal friends and advisors. I look forward to seeing him again when I go to heaven." The Archbishop of Canterbury, Rowan Williams, wrote:

The death of John Stott will be mourned by countless Christians throughout the world. During a long life of unsparing service and witness, John won a unique place in the hearts of all who encountered him, whether in person or through his many books. He was a man of rare graciousness and deep personal kindness, a superb communicator and a sensitive and skilled counsellor. Without ever compromising his firm evangelical faith, he showed himself willing to challenge some of the ways in which that faith had become conventional or inward-looking. It is not too much to say that he helped to change the face of evangelicalism internationally, arguing for the necessity of "holistic" mission that applied the Gospel of Jesus to every area of life, including social and political questions. But he will be remembered most warmly as an expositor of scripture and a teacher of the faith, whose depth and simplicity brought doctrine alive in all sorts of new ways.

Stott's funeral was held on 8 August 2011 at All Souls Church.

A memorial website remembrance book (closed 2017) attracted comments from over one thousand individuals. Memorial services for Stott were held at St Paul's Cathedral, London; Holy Trinity Cathedral, Auckland, New Zealand; St Andrew's Cathedral, Sydney, Australia; College Church, Wheaton, Illinois, United States; Anglican Network Church of the Good Shepherd, Vancouver, Canada; St. Paul's, Bloor Street, Toronto, Canada; as well as in cities across Africa, Asia and Latin America. Upon his death, he was cremated, his ashes were interred at Dale Cemetery, in Pembrokeshire, Wales.

Frances Whitehead, his secretary since 1956, was the executor of his will and she ensured that all his papers were deposited in the Lambeth Palace archive the year after his death.

== Influence ==
Stott has had considerable influence in evangelicalism. In a November 2004 editorial on Stott, the New York Times columnist David Brooks cited Michael Cromartie of the Ethics and Public Policy Center as saying that "if evangelicals could elect a pope, Stott is the person they would likely choose".

=== Writing ===
Stott wrote over 50 books, some of which appear only in Chinese, Korean, or Spanish, as well as many articles and papers.

One of these is Basic Christianity, a book which seeks to explain the message of Christianity, and convince its readers of its truth and importance.

The Preacher's Portrait: Some New Testament Word Studies, published in 1961 and an important reference for clergy.

He was also the author of The Cross of Christ (ISBN 0-87784-998-6), of which J. I. Packer stated, "No other treatment of this supreme subject says so much so truly and so well."

Other books he wrote include Essentials: A Liberal–Evangelical Dialogue, a dialogue with the liberal cleric and theologian David L. Edwards, over whether what evangelicals hold as essential should be seen as such. In 2005, he produced Evangelical Truth, which summarises what he regarded as the central claims of Christianity, essential for evangelicalism.

Upon his formal retirement from public engagements, Stott continued to engage in regular writing until his death. In 2008, he produced The Anglican Evangelical Doctrine of Infant Baptism with J. Alec Motyer.

An introduction to his thought can be found in his two final substantial publications, which act as a summation of his thinking. Both were published by the publishing house with which he had a lifelong association, IVP.

- In 2007, his reflections on the life of the church: The Living Church: Convictions of a Lifelong Pastor.
- In January 2010, at the age of 88, he saw the launch of what would be his final book: The Radical Disciple. It concludes with a poignant farewell and appeal for his legacy to be continued through the work of the Langham Partnership International.

=== Anglican evangelicalism ===
Stott's churchmanship fell within the conservative evangelical wing of the Church of England. He played a key role as a leader of evangelicalism within the Church of England, and was regarded as instrumental in persuading evangelicals to play an active role in the Church of England rather than leaving for exclusively evangelical denominations. There were two major events where he played a key role in this regard.

He was chairing the National Assembly of Evangelicals in 1966, a convention organised by the Evangelical Alliance, when Martyn Lloyd-Jones made an unexpected call for evangelicals to unite as evangelicals and no longer stay within their "mixed" denominations. This view was motivated by a belief that true Christian fellowship requires evangelical views on central topics such as the atonement and the inspiration of Scripture. Lloyd-Jones was a key figure to many in the free churches, and evangelical Anglicans regarded Stott similarly. The two leaders publicly disagreed, as Stott, though not scheduled as a speaker that evening, used his role as chairman to state his opposition to Lloyd-Jones' views, saying that his opinion went against history and the Bible. The following year saw the first National Evangelical Anglican Congress, which was held at Keele University. At this conference, largely due to Stott's influence, evangelical Anglicans committed themselves to full participation in the Church of England, rejecting the separationist approach proposed by Lloyd-Jones.

These two conferences effectively fixed the direction of a large part of the British evangelical community. Although there is an ongoing debate as to the exact nature of Lloyd-Jones's views, they undoubtedly caused the two groupings to adopt diametrically opposed positions. These positions, and the resulting split, continue largely unchanged to this day.

=== Honours ===
Stott was appointed a Chaplain to Queen Elizabeth II in 1959 and, on his retirement in 1991, an Extra Chaplain. He was appointed a Commander of the Order of the British Empire (CBE) in the New Year Honours 2006. He received a Lambeth Doctorate of Divinity in 1983, as well as five honorary degrees, including doctorates from Trinity Evangelical Divinity School (1971), Wycliffe College, Toronto (1993), and Brunel University (1997).

=== Annihilationism ===
Stott tentatively held to annihilationism, which is the view that the final state of the unsaved, known as hell, is death and destruction, rather than everlasting conscious torment. Stott said that: "the ultimate annihilation of the wicked should at least be accepted as a legitimate, biblically founded alternative to their eternal conscious torment." This led to a heated debate within mainstream evangelical Christianity: some writers criticised Stott in very strong terms while others supported his views.

=== Anti-Zionism ===
Stott stated his firm opposition to Zionism: "Political Zionism and Christian Zionism are anathema to Christian faith ... The true Israel today is neither Jews nor Israelis, but believers in the Messiah, even if they are Gentiles ..."

== Personal life ==
Stott never married and had no children, remaining celibate his entire life. He said, "The gift of singleness is more a vocation than an empowerment, although to be sure God is faithful in supporting those he calls." He lived simply and gave his wealth away. 'Pride is without doubt the greatest temptation of Christian leaders', he said. When asked what he would change if he had his time again he replied 'I would pray more'.

Stott's favourite relaxation was birdwatching; his book The Birds Our Teachers draws on this interest.

== Bibliography ==
- The books of John Stott

== See also ==
- International Fellowship of Evangelical Students
