= Crosby Hall, London =

Medieval London building

Crosby Moran Hall
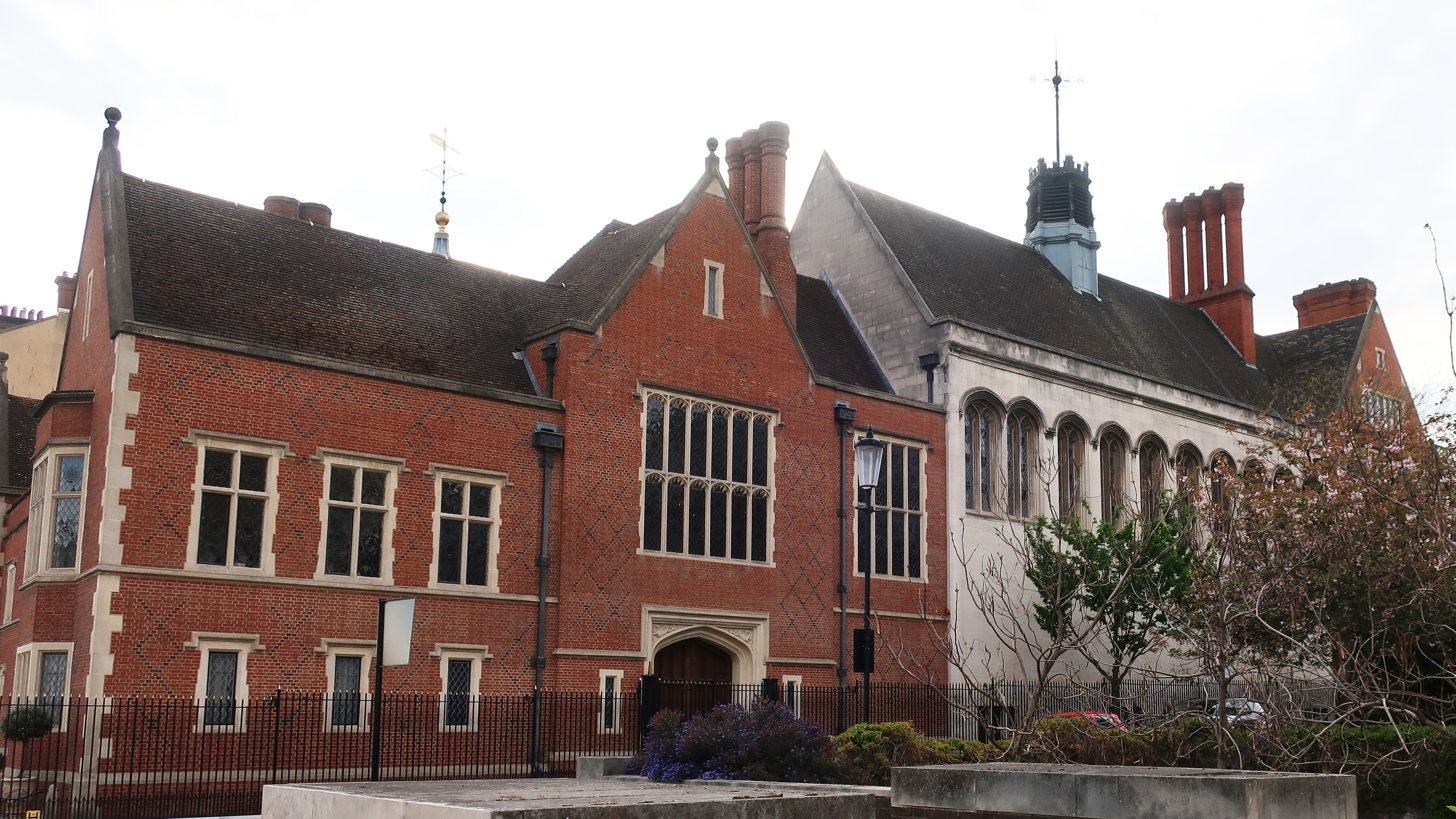
- Crosby Hall at Chelsea from the east, showing the medieval Great Hall, faced in Portland stone, to the right; with 1990s additions in brick to the left

- Current location of Crosby Hall in Greater London
- 51°28′56.94″N 0°10′21.52″W
- Location: Cheyne Walk, Chelsea, London

History
- Built: 1466 (Great Hall and Parlour); 1910 (re-erection); 1925–26 (North Range); 1996–2021 (remainder)
- Built for: Sir John Crosby (1466)

Site notes
- Architect: Walter Godfrey (1910)
- Architectural styles: Medieval, Tudor
- Restored: 1910; 1988–2021
- Owner: Christopher Moran

Listed Building – Grade II*
- Designated: 24 June 1954
- Reference no.: 1358160

Crosby Hall is a historic building in London. The Great Hall was built in 1466 and originally known as Crosby Place on Bishopsgate, in the City of London. It was moved in 1910 to its present site in Cheyne Walk, Chelsea. It now forms part of a private residence, which in 2021 was renamed Crosby Moran Hall.

The Great Hall, and additional work of 1910 and 1925–1926, are listed Grade II*. Although fragmentary and not on its original site, this is the only example of a medieval City merchant house surviving in London. Between 1988 and 2021 it was restored, and further buildings added, to create the present complex. The Great Hall is considered to be the most important surviving secular domestic medieval building in London.

== History ==
=== Bishopsgate ===
The Great Hall is the only surviving part of the medieval mansion of Crosby Place, Bishopsgate, in the City of London. It was built between 1466 and 1475 on the grounds of St Helen's Convent next to St Helen's Church, Bishopsgate (Coordinates: 51.5145°N 0.0832°W) by the wool merchant and alderman, Sir John Crosby, a warden of the Worshipful Company of Grocers and auditor of the City of London.

Crosby originally leased the main property before 1466, and in that year renewed his lease, incorporating additional, adjacent properties. Over the following years, he progressively developed the property into a large mansion. However, as John Stow later reported, "Sir John died in 1475, so short a space enjoyed he that sumptuous building." In 1476, the hall was bequeathed to his widow, Anne, Lady Crosby. Archaeological fieldwork in 1982 and 2005–9 recorded elements of the layout of the medieval complex.

==== Richard III ====
By 1483, the Duke of Gloucester, later King Richard III, acquired the Bishopsgate property from Lady Crosby. It was used as one of his London homes during the time of his protection of the Princes in the Tower, who later disappeared.

Upon Richard III's arrival from York in May 1483, Robert Fabyan in his Chronicle wrote that "the Duke lodged hymself in Crosbye's Place, in Bishoppesgate Street" where the Mayor and citizens waited upon him with the offer of the Crown. Holinshed's Chronicles described that "little by little all folke withdrew from the Tower, and drew unto Crosbies in Bishops gates Street, where the Protector kept his household. The Protector had the resort; the King in maner desolate." It is generally believed the Hall was used as a venue for the Duke's council and plotting.

Crosby Hall was thus used as a setting for several scenes of William Shakespeare's first published play Richard III, in which the Plantagenet King refers to Crosby Hall (then Crosby Place): "When you haue done repaire to Crosby place" (Act I, Scene 3), "At Crosby place there shall you finde vs both" (Act III, Scene 1).

==== Tudor period ====
John Stow in his Survey of London (1598) described Crosby Hall as being "of stone and timber, very large and beautiful, and [when first built] the highest at that time in London".

In 1501, Catherine of Aragon resided at Crosby Hall along with her retinue as she arrived in England to marry Prince Arthur, Henry VII's eldest son. At the time, Crosby Hall was owned by Sir Bartholomew Reade, Lord Mayor, who made it his Mansion House and is recorded as throwing extravagant feasts for ambassadors sent by Maximilian I, Holy Roman Emperor. During the Lombard Street riots of May 1511 sheriff John Rest (later Lord Mayor) had the occupancy of Crosby Hall and several of those taken into custody were confined there prior to removal to Lambeth Palace.

Crosby Hall next belonged to Thomas More, Lord Chancellor of England to King Henry VIII, who took a lease on the building in 1519 before his purchase of it in 1523. He also owned the riverfront estate in Chelsea on which the building now rests. It is "often…accepted" that More wrote the second part of his Utopia while residing at Crosby Hall, although this is unlikely, given the work's publication date of 1516, at least three years before More took possession. His later editions were conceived of during his leasehold.

In 1523, Thomas More sold the remainder of his lease in Bishopsgate to his close friend and patron, the wealthy Anglo-Italian merchant, Antonio Bonvisi. Bonvisi protected the lease of the mansion in various arrangements following More's execution and throughout the Dissolution of the Monasteries, which affected freeholds under the "Priory of St. Eleyns" including that of Crosby Place. In 1547, upon the death of Henry VIII, Bonvisi leased the mansion back to Thomas More's nephew, William Rastell, and Thomas More's son-in-law and biographer, William Roper.

Shakespeare resided in the parish of St Helen's Bishopsgate and would have been within daily sight of Crosby Hall, which is referenced several times in Richard III. He was probably familiar with the reputation of Bonvisi, and Antonio is used frequently as a name in his plays.

Crosby Hall was sold in 1594 to the wealthy Alderman John Spencer, Lord Mayor of London, "Rich Spencer", who further enhanced the building, kept his mayoralty there, and was known to throw lavish banquets with diplomatic flair. Following a dinner in the Great Hall, Spencer forgave a youth accused by the visiting French duke of murdering an Englishman that evening outside Crosby Hall, after which "The English began to love, and the French to fear him more." Spencer entertained Queen Elizabeth I, Shakespeare, the Duc de Sully, the youngest son of the Prince of Orange, other notable figures, and ambassadors.

In 1601, Sir Walter Raleigh, a favoured adviser of Queen Elizabeth I, lodged at Crosby Hall. Other residents during the Elizabethan era included the poet Dowager Countess of Pembroke Mary Sidney, one of the most notable writers of her time, following her time at court within the Privy Chamber of Elizabeth I. Sidney most likely resided at Crosby Hall from 1609 to 1615, when it was owned by the Lord Privy Seal, Henry Howard, 1st Earl of Northampton. Sidney's literary circle included Shakespeare and Ben Jonson, who were guests at Crosby Hall.

==== English Civil War ====
During the English Civil War the tenant of Crosby Hall was Sir John Langham, a City merchant, Sheriff and, at that time, a noted supporter of Parliament. Once again Crosby Hall was used as a temporary prison, for Royalist prisoners.

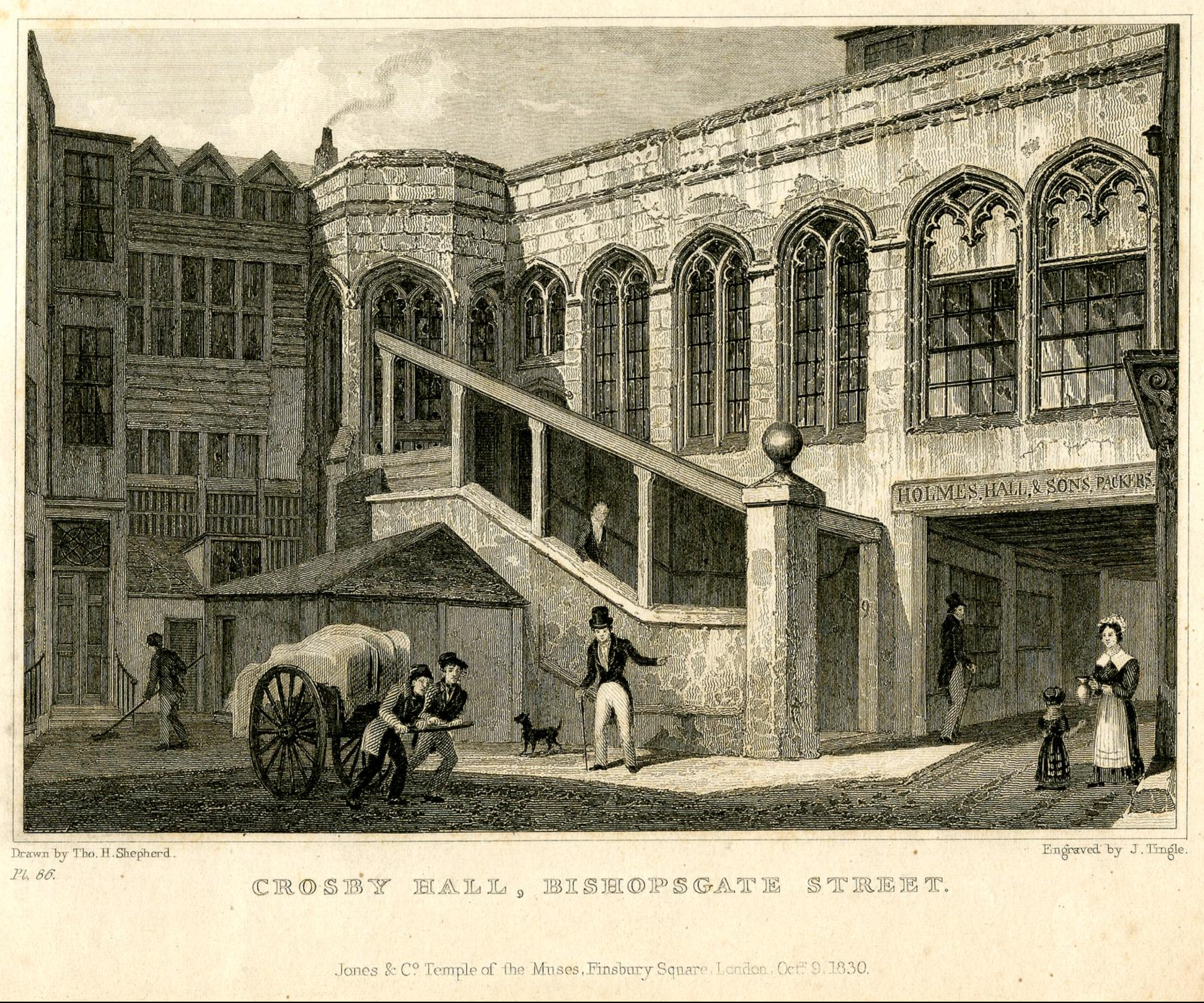
Two additional floors, with an external stairway for access, were added in stages between 1672 and 1788

==== East India Company ====
Langham considered the house unfit to live in and divided the Hall, making over part to a Presbyterian congregation for use as a meeting room and part to the East India Company. From 1621 to 1638 Crosby Hall was the headquarters of the East India Company. During this time, the building underwent significant wear and repairs to its turret and stone. It was used as the Company merchant meeting place and offices, and the Great Hall was used as a warehouse for the Company's growing number of traded goods from the far East.

==== Fire ====
Crosby Hall survived the Great Fire of London of 1666 but in 1672, while under the tenancy of Sir Simon Langham (son of the above John Langham), the property was severely damaged by fire, with only the Great Hall and one wing surviving. The damaged portions were demolished and the land sold for building, forming the site of the present-day Crosby Square.

==== First preservation campaign ====
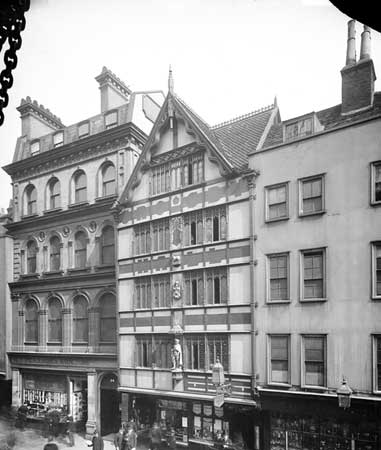
Crosby Hall, showing commercial frontage added 1841

From 1835–36, a campaign was launched to save the remainder of the Hall, which had begun to show signs of decay. A Committee chaired by Alderman W. T. Copeland, M.P., then Lord Mayor of London, met at The City of London Tavern at Bishopsgate Street to support the Hall's repair, eventually raising a small sum. However, the majority of the funds needed were provided through a single lady, Maria Hackett, who took over the lease at significant personal expense. Hackett assumed all liabilities, oversaw the laying of stones for an adjoining council chamber, and funded the removal of the inserted floors.

==== Restaurant ====
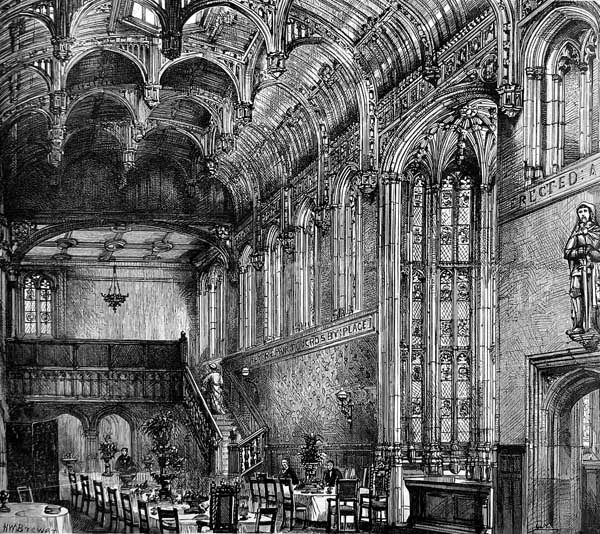
The interior of Crosby Hall in 1884, when it was in use as a restaurant

In 1868 Crosby Hall was turned into a sumptuous restaurant and bar by Messrs. Gordon & Co., whose directors were Frederick Gordon and Horatio Davies, later owner of Pimm's and Lord Mayor of London. They bought the freehold in early 1873 for about £37,000.

It was sold in April 1907 for £175,000 to the Chartered Bank of India, Australia, and China whose directors intended to pull down one of the most ancient buildings in the City of London and build a new bank building in its stead. Its impending destruction aroused a storm of protest, and a campaign was once again started to save it.

==== Second preservation campaign ====
A committee within the City of London Corporation led by Sir Vezey Strong was established for the preservation of Crosby Hall. After initial attempts within the Corporation failed to raise sufficient funds, various suggestions for payment, relocation, or lettings along the frontage of Great St Helen's were made by the public and press. The National Trust and British Archaeological Society also campaigned to save Crosby Hall, urging that it had "extreme interest as the only existing example of a medieval merchant's house in the City, and also having regard to the historic and illustrious personages who had lived in it."

King Edward VII himself caused a letter to be issued by his Private Secretary Francis Knollys, 1st Vicount Knollys to Sir Laurence Gomme, Clerk of the London County Council:

Buckingham Palace, August 6th, 1907

Dear Mr. Gomme,
The King has been informed that there appears to be some chance of Crosby Hall, a building of great historic interest, being pulled down. His Majesty has seen the report presented to the London County Council on the subject, and commands me to inquire whether this report has met with a favourable response, and to express his hope that means may be found to preserve such an interesting relic of old London.
Believe me, yours very truly,

Knollys

=== Chelsea ===
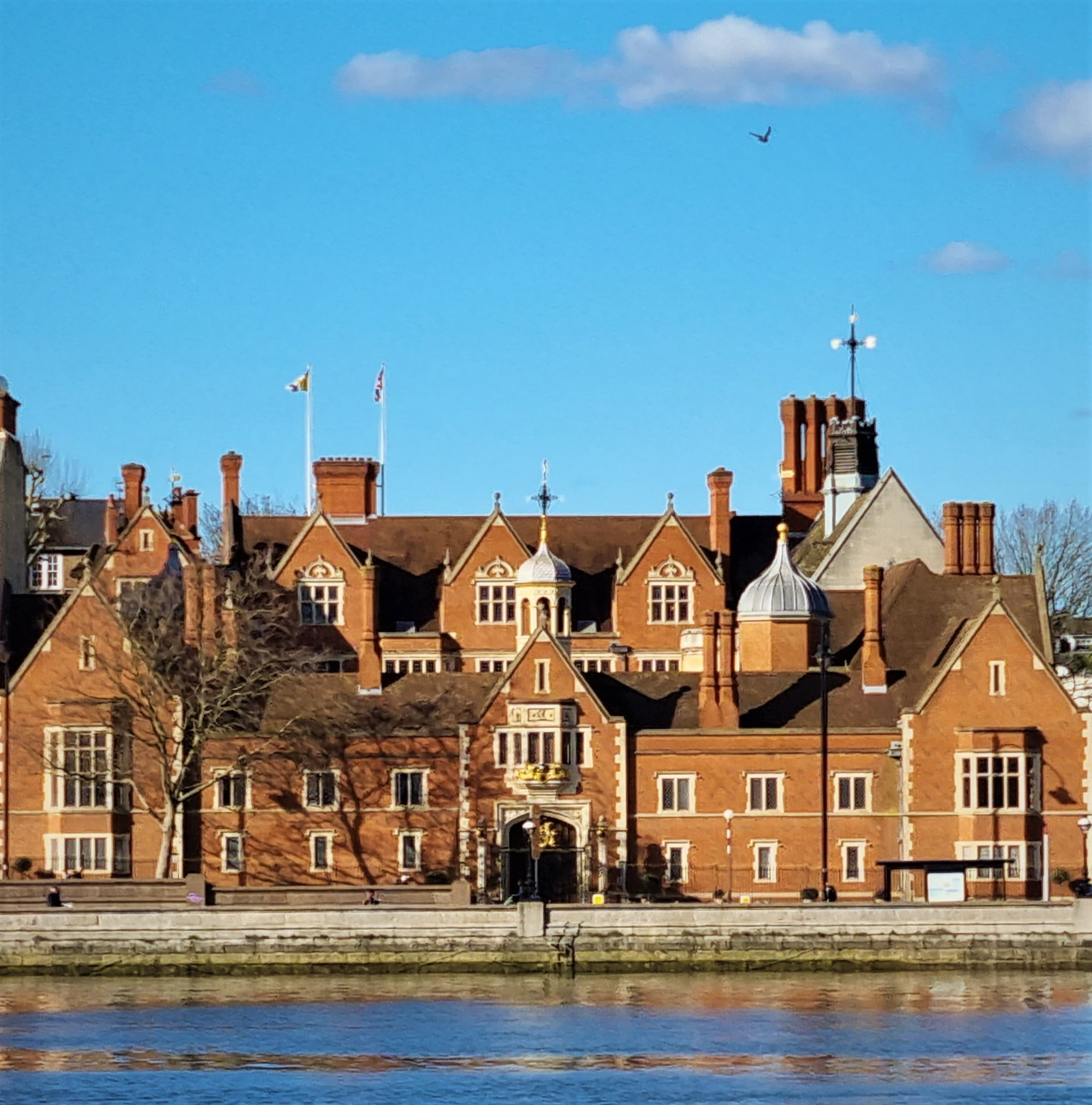
Crosby Moran Hall viewed across the Thames from the south. The white stone gable visible in the background to the right belongs to the original medieval Great Hall, whilst the riverside frontage dates from the 1990s and the higher northern wing behind it from the 1920s.

In 1910, the medieval structure was once again reprieved from threatened demolition and moved stone by stone from Bishopsgate to its present site in Chelsea. The relocation required at least 1500 separate inventoried pieces to be moved five miles and reassembled with extreme care. The site was provided by the former London County Council, whilst the salvage, catalogue and storage were paid for by the Chartered Bank of India, Australia, and China, whose directors had purchased the Bishopsgate site to build new offices.

The architect responsible for the building's relocation and restoration was Walter Godfrey, who oversaw the works carried out by Trollope and Colls. Neo-Tudor brick additions designed by Godfrey were constructed around the Great Hall. The Duchess of York (afterwards Queen Elizabeth, the Queen Mother) formally opened Crosby Hall on its Chelsea site in 1926.

Architectural historian Simon Thurley, while acknowledging that "little of the original building, […] largely hidden by the accretions of nineteenth and twentieth-century restorations, […] has been left intact", assesses the remaining elements as "the most important surviving secular domestic medieval building in London".

==== World War I ====
During World War I, Crosby Hall was a refuge for Belgian refugees who fled to Britain and were aided by the Chelsea War Refugee Committee. Henry James wrote that Crosby Hall's "almost incomparable roof has arched all this winter and spring [1914–1915] over a scene ... more pathetic than any that have ever drawn down its ancient far-off blessing". Crosby Hall was also the site of concerts held by the War Refugee Committee in aid of the exiles. A war memorial in Crosby Hall reads as follows and includes a poem by Belgian poet Émile Cammaerts:

To commemorate the gratitude of Belgian exiles to the Chelsea War Refugee Committee which from Crosby Hall, during the Great War, dispensed hospitality, organized relief for our persecuted and exiled compatriots and aided our maimed soldiers to regain their independence. Je sens dans l'air que je respire / Un parfum de liberté..../ Un peu de cette terre hospitalière..../ Et baisons ensemble, en pensant au pays, le sol de l'Angleterre. Cammaerts 1914–1919

==== British Federation of University Women ====
The British Federation of University Women (BFUW) took a long lease on Crosby Hall and employed Godfrey to build a tall Arts and Crafts residential block at right angles to the great hall in 1925–1927. The federation raised money for the work through a major campaign reaching out to individual women, industrialists, philanthropists, and Chelsea residents. Two years into the campaign, £17,000 of their initial £25,000 target had been raised. The expanded Crosby Hall included offices for both the British and International Federation of University Women (IFUW). Theodora Bosanquet was executive secretary to the IFUW from 1920 to 1935, developing its library to a high standard and promoting intellectual activity and exchange across nations. Following the death of her life partner Margaret Rhondda in 1958, Bosanquet moved to a single room at Crosby Hall. The residential block was used as a hall of residence for visiting university women, some of whom received IFUW scholarships to travel and study.

Many of the foreign women were spending just the one year in England, and ... as a result felt this year to be one of the greatest experiences of their lives. For this reason the majority of the Crosby Hall residents lived at an enormous pitch of intensity, lifted out of their everyday habits, and this, above all, was what shaped the intellectual life of Crosby Hall.

— Viennese physicist Berta Karlik

==== World War II ====
With the rise of National Socialism (Nazism) in Germany and the passage of the anti-Jewish Law for the Restoration of the Professional Civil Service on 7 April 1933, Crosby Hall provided an important source of support for women academics who were being forced out of Germany. The BFUW undertook an additional fund-raising appeal on their behalf, which met with an enthusiastic response. As a result, the BFUW was able to provide 3 new 12-month residential fellowships (in addition to 7 existing ones) as well as smaller awards. In 1934 the new fellowship recipients were Emmy Klieneberger-Nobel, Betty Heimann, and Helen Rosenau. Among many other women who received funding and support were Adelheid Heimann (no relation to Betty), Gertrud Kornfeld, Dora Ilse, and Erna Hollitscher.

I cannot describe what it meant to me and other refugees when we were allowed to stay there, after the persecution and hatred that we had undergone in "Greater Germany". In Crosby Hall we were not only tolerated but welcomed, and we found an atmosphere of kindness and understanding which assured us that there was another world outside Nazi Germany in which we might be allowed to live freely, and perhaps happily. I feel sure that everyone who stayed in Crosby Hall felt that atmosphere, from whichever part of the world she came.

— Erna Hollitscher

Crosby Hall was requisitioned by the war effort, but reopened in 1946.

==== Greater London Council ====
After the London County Council (LCC) was abolished in 1965, the site passed to the Greater London Council (GLC), who maintained it until 1986, when the GLC was abolished. The London Residuary Body, charged with disposing of the GLC's assets, put Crosby Hall up for sale.

==== Christopher Moran ====
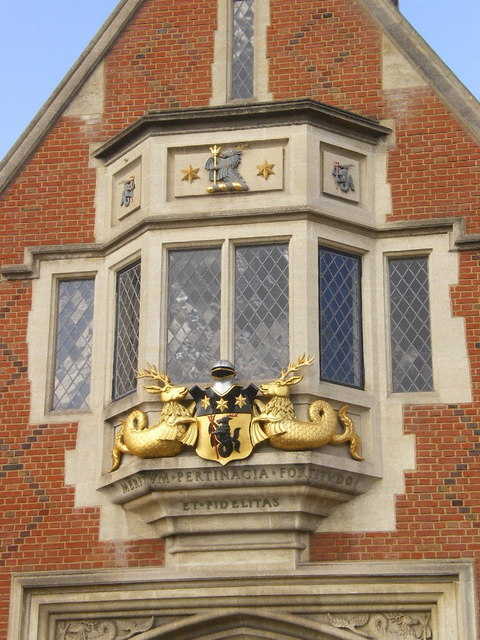
Coat of arms of Christopher Moran over the entrance in the 1990s southern range on Cheyne Walk

Crosby Hall was bought in 1988 by Christopher Moran, a businessman and philanthropist who is the Chairman of Co-operation Ireland. Until then the site's frontage had been open to Cheyne Walk and the River Thames and its central garden was open to the public. Moran commissioned a scheme to close the frontage with a new building and convert the complex to a luxury mansion.

The scheme caused considerable controversy, but was given eventually permission after a Public Inquiry in December 1996, following two previous refusals by Kensington and Chelsea Council. Moran paid for the building's restoration, including initial stabilization of the Great Hall's 15th-century Reigate Stone. The project was initially overseen by the architects Carden and Godfrey (a practice founded by Emil Godfrey, son of Walter Godfrey), although the firm subsequently fell into legal disputes with Moran amid allegations of unpaid bills and unsatisfactorily completed work.

The garden was restored by Marjorie Wyndham-Quin, and only plants found in Tudor England were used. The craftsmen were selected by David Honour, former head of design at Historic Royal Palaces. Stone carving of heraldic beasts, including the lions on the building's front gates, was completed by Dick Reid OBE to display the heraldry of Moran and residents dating from 1466 according to Tudor, Elizabethan, or early Stuart historical precedent.

The completed complex was renamed Crosby Moran Hall at the beginning of 2021. In February 2023, the chapel was ecumenically blessed in a service of dedication by Cardinal Vincent Nichols, Archbishop of Westminster, and Canon Jamie Hawkey of Westminster Abbey.

== Notable residents at the original site ==
- Richard, Duke of Gloucester, 1483
- Catherine of Aragon, 1501
- Bartholomew Reade, Lord Mayor of London, 1501–1505
- Sir Thomas More, Lord High Chancellor of England, 1523–1524.
- William Roper (son-in-law of Thomas More), 1547
- John Spencer, Lord Mayor of London, 1594
- Sir Walter Raleigh, 1601.
- The Earls of Northampton between 1609 and 1671,
- Dowager Countess of Pembroke, Mary Sidney from 1609–1615.
- Headquarters of the East India Company, 1621–38

== See also ==
- List of demolished buildings and structures in London

== Bibliography ==
- Foster, Sir W. (1913). "The East India Company at Crosby House, 1621–38". London Topographical Record. 8: 106–39.
- Godfrey, W. Emil (1982). "Crosby Hall and its re-erection". Transactions of the Ancient Monuments Society. 26: 227–43.
- Godfrey, Walter H. (1913). "Crosby Hall (re-erected)". Chelsea, Pt. II. Survey of London. Vol. 4. London. pp. 15–17 – via British History Online.
- Goss, Charles William Frederick (1908). Crosby Hall: A Chapter in the History of London. London: Crowther & Goodman.
- Knight, Charles, ed. (1841). "Crosby Place". London. Vol. 1. London: Charles Knight. pp. 317–32.
- Norman, Philip (1909). "Crosby Place". London Topographical Record. 6: 1–22.
- Norman, Philip; Caröe, W. D. (1908). Crosby Place. Survey of London Monograph. Vol. 9. London – via British History Online.
- Pitt, Ken (2022). "Crosby Place, a 15th-century mansion: excavations at Crosby Square, City of London EC2". Transactions of the London and Middlesex Archaeological Society. 73: 157–81.
- Saint, Andrew (1991). "Ashbee, Geddes, Lethaby and the rebuilding of Crosby Hall". Architectural History. 34: 206–223. doi:10.2307/1568600. JSTOR 1568600. S2CID 192383377.
- Sweet, Rosemary (2017). "The preservation of Crosby Hall, c.1830–1850". Historical Journal. 60 (3): 687–719. doi:10.1017/S0018246X15000564. hdl:2381/35989. S2CID 163011866.
- Thurley, Simon (2003). "Crosby Hall – 'the most important surviving domestic medieval building in London'". Country Life. Vol. 197, no. 40. pp. 72–5.
