= St Helen's Church, Bishopsgate =

Coordinates: 51.5148°N 0.0818°W

St Helen's Bishopsgate
- Church of Saint Helen's the Great, Bishopsgate
- Great St Helen's Church
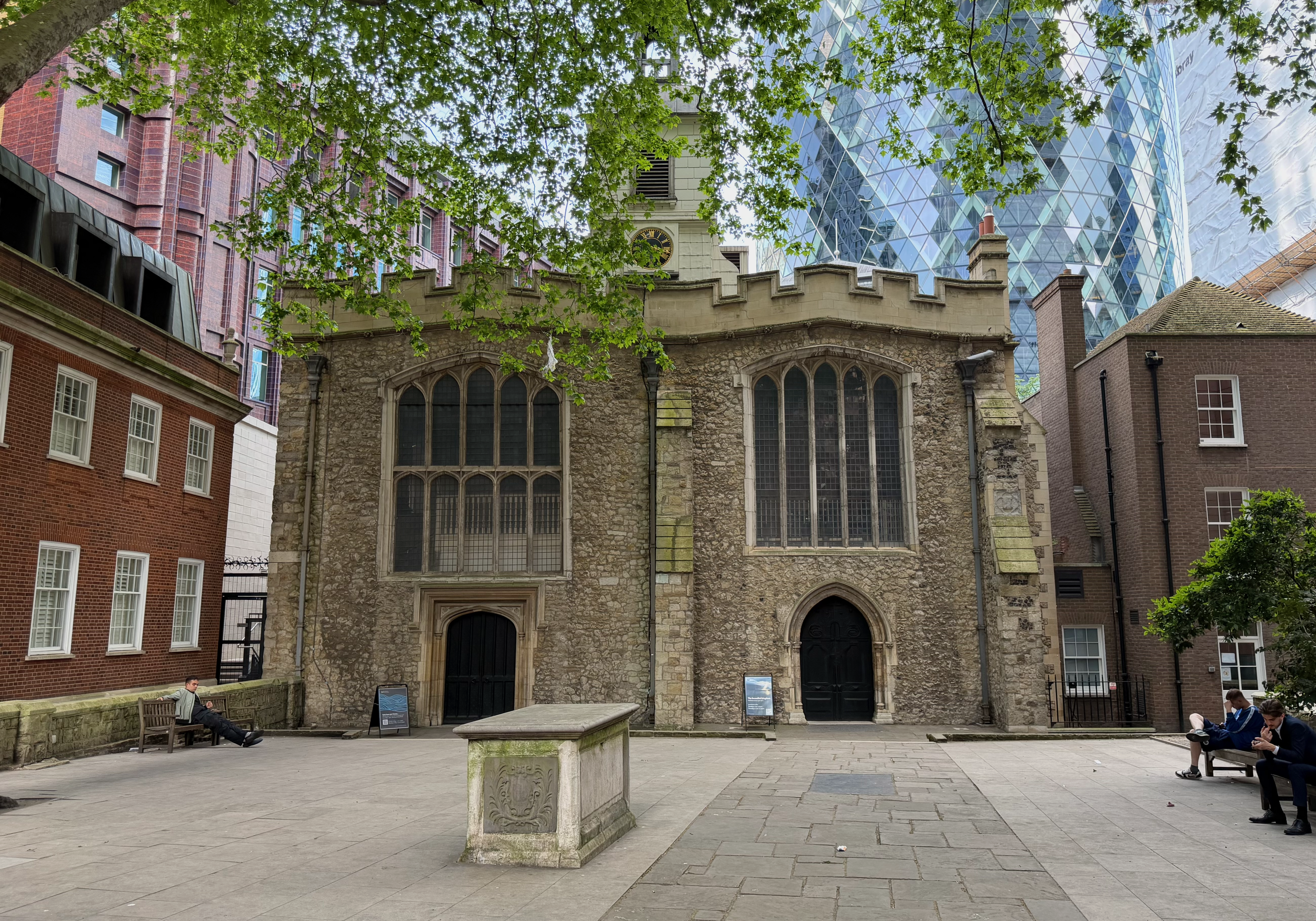
- St Helen's Bishopsgate pictured in 2026

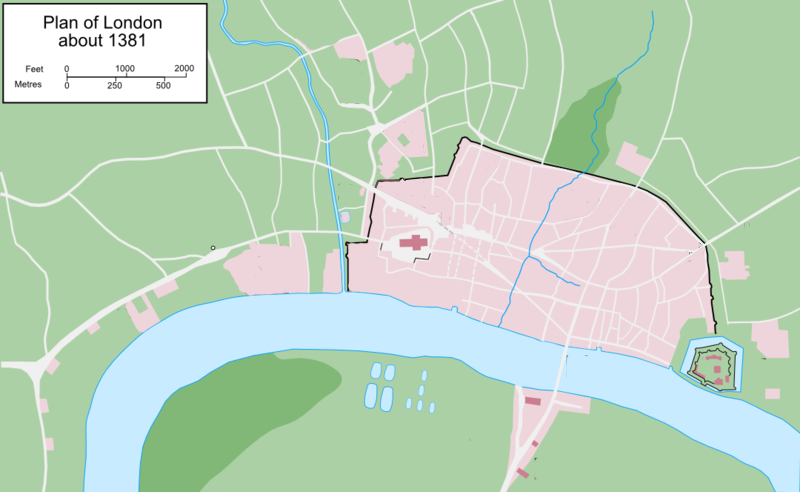
- Location within City of London Location within City of London in 1300
- OS grid reference: TQ 33204 81285
- Location: Great St Helen's, City of London, EC2
- Country: England
- Denomination: Church of England
- Previous denomination: Roman Catholic (to 1538)
- Religious order: Order of St Benedict (1210–1538)
- Churchmanship: Conservative Evangelical
- Website: st-helens.org.uk

History
- Status: Parish church
- Founded: Mid-12th century
- Founder(s): William Goldsmith (founder of Benedictine nunnery on site, 1210)
- Dedication: Helena of Constantinople

Architecture
- Functional status: Active
- Heritage designation: Grade I listed building
- Style: Perpendicular Gothic

Administration
- Diocese: London
- Parish: St Helen's Bishopsgate with St Andrew Undershaft and St Ethelburga Bishopsgate and St Martin Outwich and St Mary Axe

Clergy
- Bishop: The Rt Revd Rob Munro (AEO)
- Rector: The Revd William Taylor

St Helen's Bishopsgate is an Anglican church in London. It is located in Great St Helen's, off Bishopsgate.

It is the largest surviving parish church in the City of London. Several notable figures are buried there, and it contains more monuments than any other church in Greater London except Westminster Abbey, hence it is sometimes referred to as the "Westminster Abbey of the City". It was the parish church of William Shakespeare when he lived in the area in the 1590s. It was one of only a few churches in the City of London to survive both the Great Fire of 1666 and the Blitz.

Owing to parish consolidation over the years, the parish is now named "St Helen's Bishopsgate with St Andrew Undershaft and St Ethelburga Bishopsgate and St Martin Outwich and St Mary Axe". The Worshipful Company of Merchant Taylors are the patrons of the benefice.

Today, it is home to a large congregation in the conservative evangelical tradition with a ministry to city workers, families, students and young professionals. Four English-speaking (and one Mandarin-speaking) church services take place each Sunday, as well as a number of midweek talks and small group Bible studies.

The nearby churches St Andrew Undershaft and St Peter upon Cornhill are also administered by St Helen's.

== History ==
=== Medieval period ===
Although it is thought that a Roman or a Saxon building might have stood on the site, the first mentions of the parish church of St Helen's date back to the mid-12th century. It is named for Helena, mother of Constantine I, credited as the discoverer of the True Cross in Jerusalem in about AD 326–328; her name was often shortened to "Helen" in England. In 1210, the Dean and chapter of St. Paul's gave William, son of William Goldsmith, permission to establish a priory of Benedictine nuns; and a nunnery was built alongside the existing church. The new church was four feet (1.2 m) wider than the parish church, and longer too, so the parish church was lengthened to match. The masonry of the outer walls as it currently stands was in place by 1300. The church was divided in two by a partition running from east to west, the northern half serving the nuns and the southern the parishioners. In 1480, four great arches were installed between the nun's choir and the parishioner's nave, and a wooden screen was put in place to separate the two. An additional screen was placed in the parish church to separate the chancel in the east end of the church, where the altar was located, from the nave.

A crypt extended north from the church under the hall. Next to the church, the priory had extensive monastic buildings; they were later acquired and used by the Worshipful Company of Leathersellers until their demolition in 1799. The church is the only surviving building from a nunnery in the City of London.

=== The Reformation ===
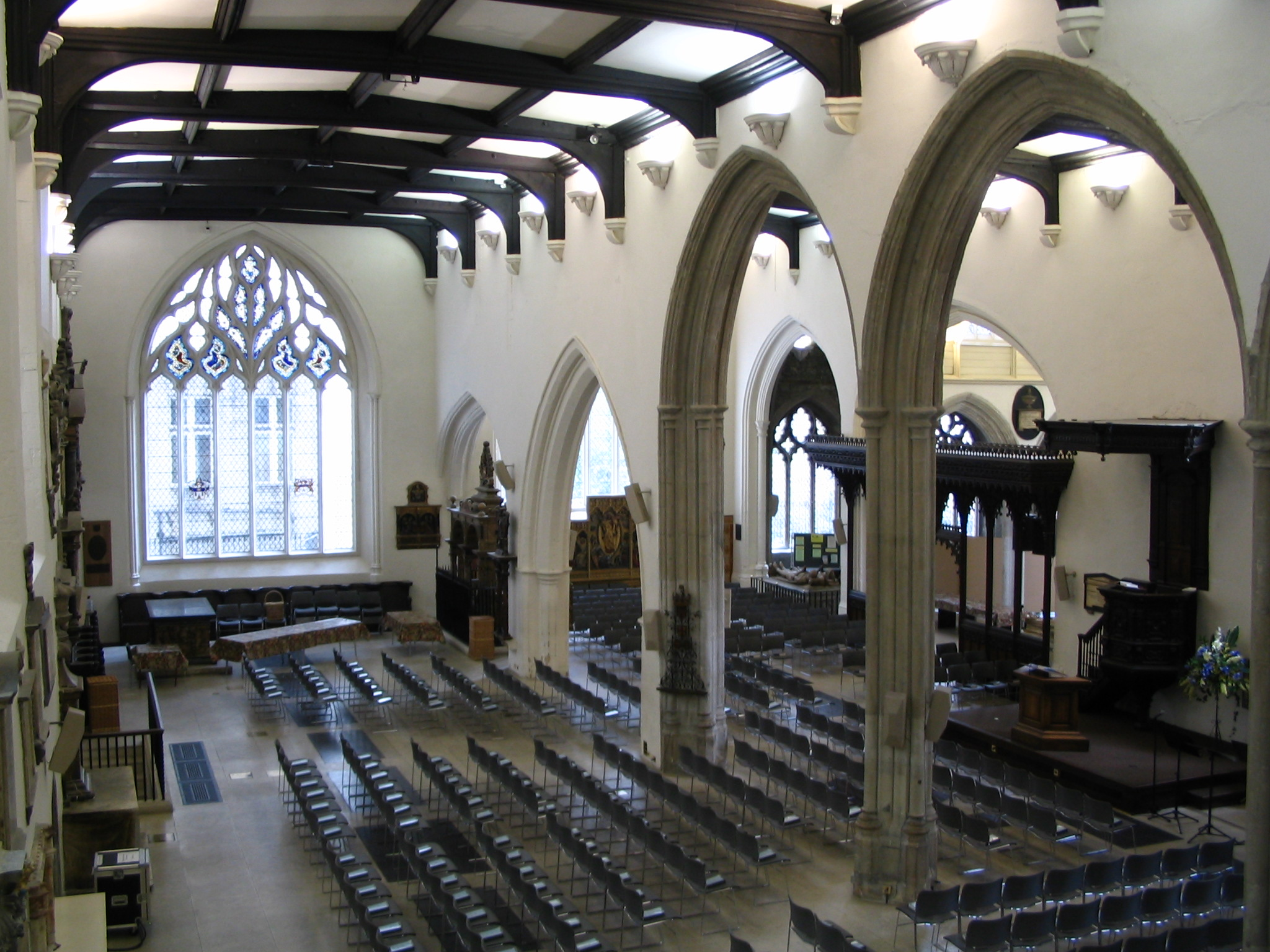
Interior of St Helen's Bishopsgate

When the priory was dissolved in 1538, the nunnery was incorporated in the parish church and the screen separating it from the rest of the church was removed. This gave the church its unusual construction consisting of two naves. In the following years, the building was rearranged according the principles of the Reformation, which put the emphasis on the preaching of the Word and on the full and active participation of the congregation. A Jacobean pulpit was erected in 1615 in a central position on the south wall, accompanied by an ornamental tester in 1640. Box pews were installed and arranged around the pulpit.

In the 17th century, extensive repairs were carried out, most notably resulting in the addition of two Neoclassical wooden doorcases. By the end of the century, a bell turret was also erected. St Helen's was one of only a few City of London churches to survive the Great Fire of London of 1666.

A new organ and organ loft were installed on the west end of the church in 1742, designed by Thomas Griffin. In 1874 the parish was united with that of St Martin Outwich when the latter's church was demolished, and the first incumbent of the new parish was John Bathurst Deane.

=== Victorian restorations ===
During the Victorian era, two significant restorations were carried out. The first, in 1865, provided the two stone tracery windows on the east end of the church and stained glass throughout the building. The second, more significant, Victorian restoration was carried out from 1891 to 1893 by John Loughborough Pearson under supervision of the rector, John Alfred Lumb Airey. This restoration was inspired by the Oxford Movement, which advocated moving the centre of importance in the church from preaching to the sacrament of the Eucharist. This new arrangement resulted in a new floor with levels gradually ascending from the west to a new high altar in the east, completed by an ornated reredos and marble pavement, once again enclosed in a chancel by a neo-Gothic screen. The organ was expanded and moved to the south transept, where two additional altars were also placed in two side chapels, the Chapel of the Holy Ghost and the Chapel of our Lady. The church was reopened on St John the Baptist's Day in 1893 by the Bishop of London, Frederick Temple.

As the church had been used as a burial ground for centuries, it is thought that over 1000 bodies had been interred in vaults under the floor by this period. The excavation of the floor at the start of the 1891 restoration caused some of the burials to emerge from the vaults: all work had to stop for one year until all human remains were translated to Ilford Cemetery, and a 2-foot (0.6 m) concrete slab was put in place between the floor and the remains of the vault.

=== 20th century ===
The church was left undamaged by the Blitz during World War II and it was designated a Grade I-listed building on 4 January 1950.

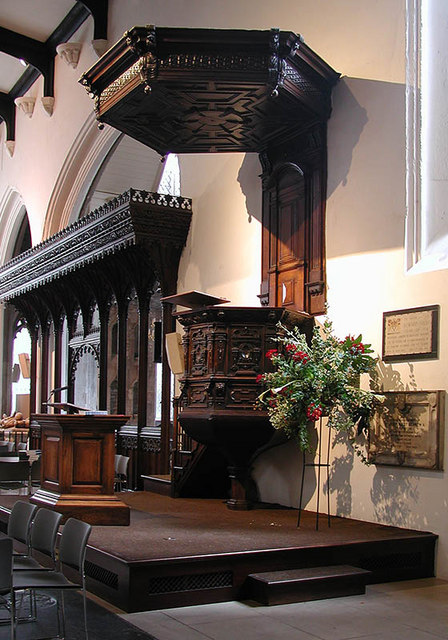
The Jacobean pulpit

When Dick Lucas became rector in 1961, St Helen's grew from a small congregation of a few individuals to a large thriving church within the conservative evangelical tradition of the Church of England, with a reputation for strong Bible teaching and preaching. As the City of London had grown to become a major business and financial centre, the church started providing an active midweek ministry to City workers. Next to the lunchtime midweek talks for workers, the three Sunday services are now attended by a diverse range of people including students, young workers, families and internationals.

In 1992 and 1993, the church was badly damaged by two IRA bombs that were set off nearby.

A full restoration was carried out by architect Quinlan Terry, an enthusiast of Georgian architecture, and designed along Reformation lines. The floor was evened out and returned to its original level, which allowed for the installation of underfloor heating, a sound reinforcement system and a baptistry in front of the pulpit. A new gallery was erected on the west end to provide additional seating and house the organ, now returned to its original position. All the windows were glazed in clear glass. The Victorian screen was rotated by 90 degrees across the south transept, opening up the former chancel. A new door was opened in the south transept. All altars were removed, giving space to a restored Georgian communion table.

The principles of this restoration sought to arrange the building once again around the preaching of the Word and strip it down of the ritualistic elements added in Victorian times, following the needs of the large Evangelical congregation. This new arrangement allowed the seating capacity to be increased from 500 to 1000, all in a large open space with a clear view on the pulpit and lectern.

=== Present day ===
Following the decision of the General Synod of the Church of England to authorise the blessing of same-sex unions, St Helen's Church declared itself to be in impaired communion with the Bishop of London Sarah Mullally and the House of Bishops. It subsequently stated that episcopal oversight at St Helen's will henceforth be provided by Bishops from the Global Fellowship of Confessing Anglicans (GAFCON) and its affiliated denominations.

On 3 October 2022, the church confirmed that its PCC had passed a resolution that rejects the ordination of women due to complementarian convictions, and therefore receive alternative episcopal oversight from the Bishop of Maidstone. Following the retirement of Rod Thomas in 2023, the name of provincial episcopal visitor for conservative evangelicals was changed to the Bishop of Ebbsfleet (currently Rob Munro).

On 24 July 2024, St Helen's held a "commissioning service" in which seven men from four dioceses who had been due to be ordained as deacons in the Church of England were instead "commissioned" to be church leaders. It had previously undertaken such a commissioning of one man in August 2023. This is not to be confused with the commissioning of "overseers" conducted under the auspices of the Church of England Evangelical Council. The service was led by Bishop Rod Thomas, the retired provincial episcopal visitor for conservative evangelical, and involved the laying on of hands. They will "preside at informal church family meals, at which bread is broken and the death of the Lord Jesus is remembered": this led to accusations that this was an attempt to practice lay presidency which is not recognised by the Church of England. The seven men were not identified and it is planned that they will be ordained at a later date "by Anglican bishops not in partnership with the unorthodox bishops of the Church of England". This lack of identification has resulted in questions relating to safeguarding, and also objections from other conservatives as to how such secrecy fits with public ministry.

== Activities ==
The church holds five services each Sunday, at 09:30am, 11:15am, a Mandarin-speaking service 2:00 pm, 4:00pm, and 6:00pm;. The Sunday afternoon and evening services are followed by an informal meal and opportunities to socialise. The morning and afternoon services provide Children's ministry

A number of lunchtime talks and meetings take place during the working week, providing an opportunity for people who work in the City of London to hear the Christian message and be encouraged to live as Christians at work.

There are also numerous small groups which meet at the church during the week. These include the "Read, Mark, Learn" (RML) groups which either study the Gospel of Mark, the Gospel of John, the Epistle to the Romans or a Bible overview over the course of a year, and the Central Focus group which studies a whole variety of topics and books from the Bible. The church also runs the Christianity Explored course regularly.

Some activities take place in the nearby church of St Peter upon Cornhill and the church of St Andrew Undershaft, which are also administered by St Helen's.

== Building ==
The present building is the result of a substantial restoration in 1993–1995 by architect Quinlan Terry, after consistent damages were incurred by two IRA bombs in 1992 and 1993.

The restoration resulted in a bright, large, flexible open-space interior that can be used in different configurations. It is equipped with modern lighting, underfloor heating, and public address system. Although some of the monuments were lost due to the bombings, the majority of them survived and were preserved in the building.

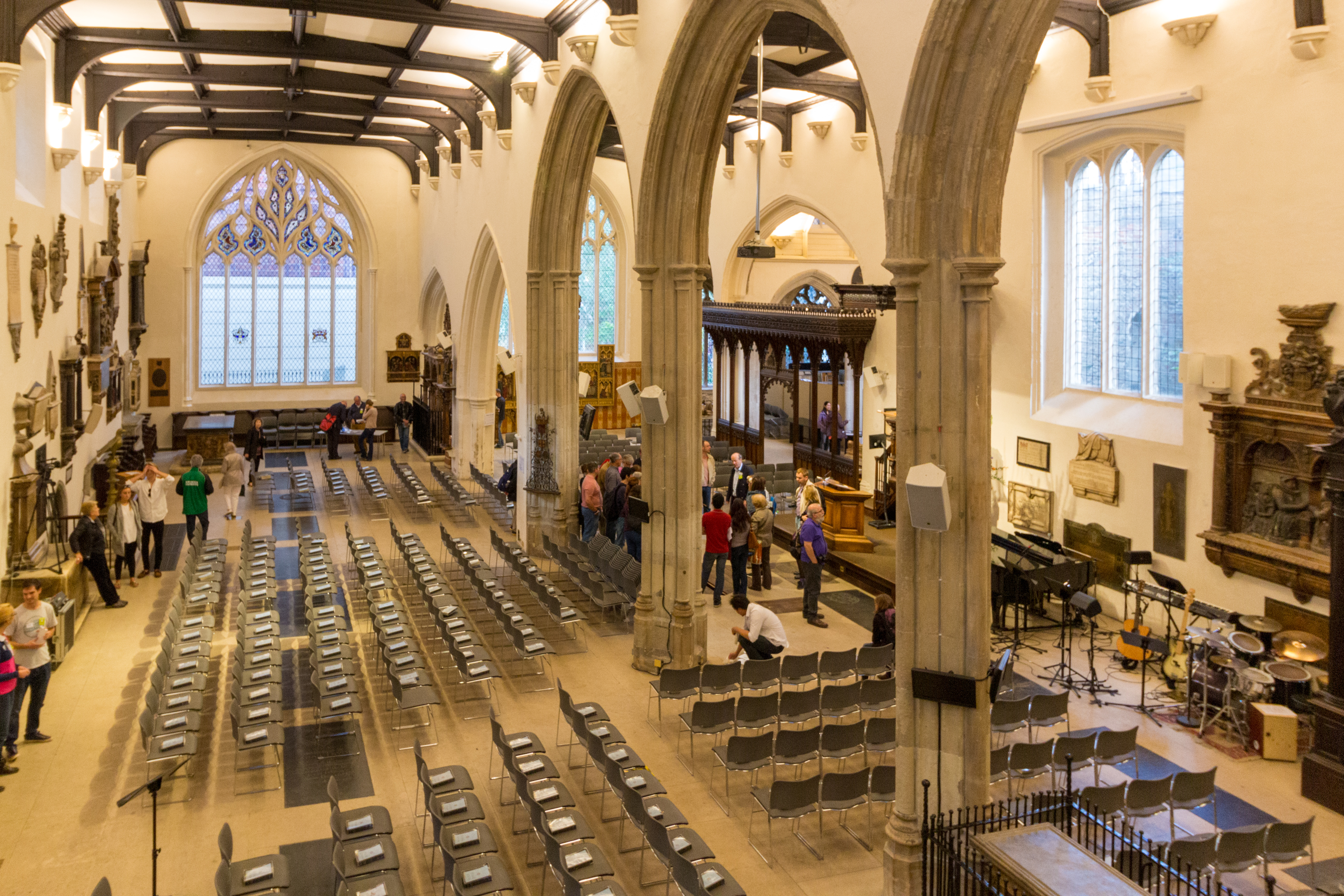

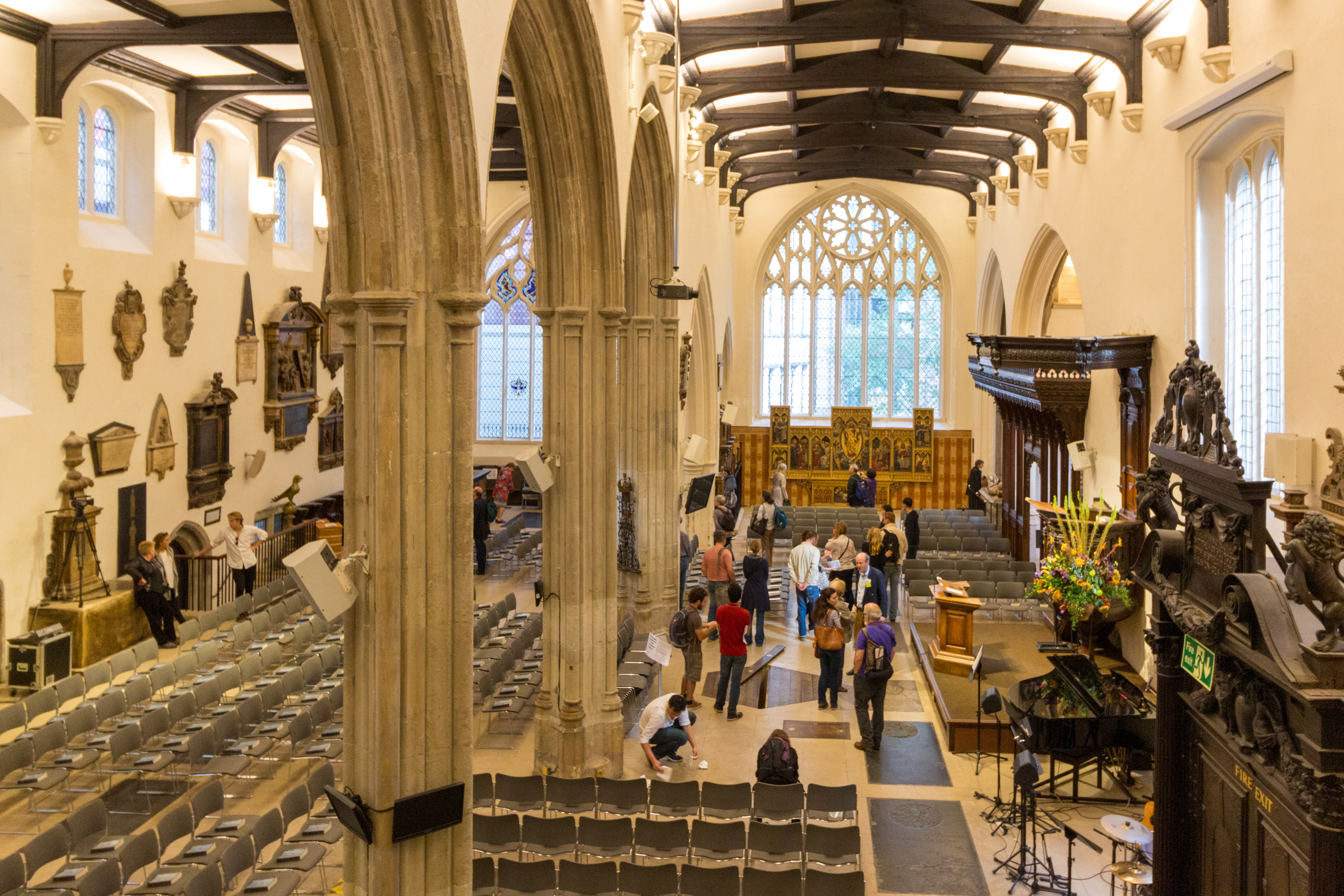

=== Memorials ===
1. North wall of the nuns' choir, near the west end, Alderman John Robinson, 1599. An Elizabethan group of kneeling figures; the deceased and his wife with nine sons and seven daughters.
2. In the north-east corner, at the east end of the nuns' choir, altar tomb of Sir Thomas Gresham, 1579. Founder of the Royal Exchange and the Gresham Lectures. Before 1995, this space was known as the Gresham Memorial Chapel
3. In the south transept, Sir Julius Caesar Adelmare, 1636. Judge of the Court of Admiralty. Altar tomb with Latin epitaph in the form of a deed to which is affixed the broad seal of the deceased. Before 1995, this was located side by side the Gresham memorial.
4. In the south-east corner of the Gresham Memorial Chapel, Sir Andrew Judd 1558. Lord Mayor, citizen and skinner. Founder of Tonbridge School.
5. Under the chancel arch, north of where the high altar once stood, Sir William Pickering, 1574. Ambassador in the reign of Queen Elizabeth I. Altar tomb with recumbent figure surmounted by a lofty canopy.
6. Under the chancel arch, south where the high altar once stood, Sir John Crosby 1476 founder of Crosby Hall, and Agnes his wife. Altar tomb with recumbent figures.
7. In the south transept, Sir John Oteswich and his wife. Formerly in the church of St Martin Outwich.
8. Against the south wall of the church, sightly to the west of the south entrance, Sir John Spencer and his wife, 1609. Altar tomb under a canopy with recumbent figures, and a third kneeling figure.
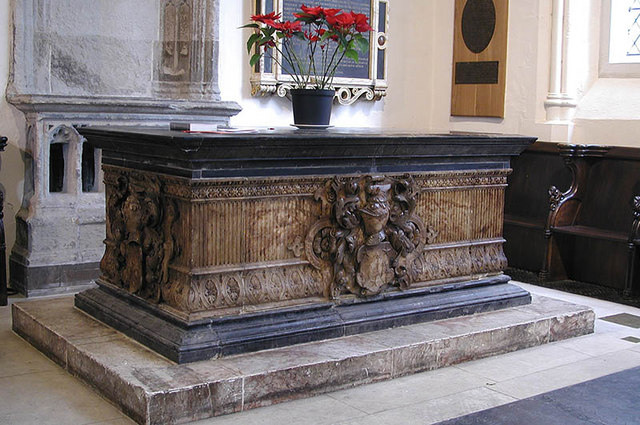
Sir Thomas Gresham memorial.

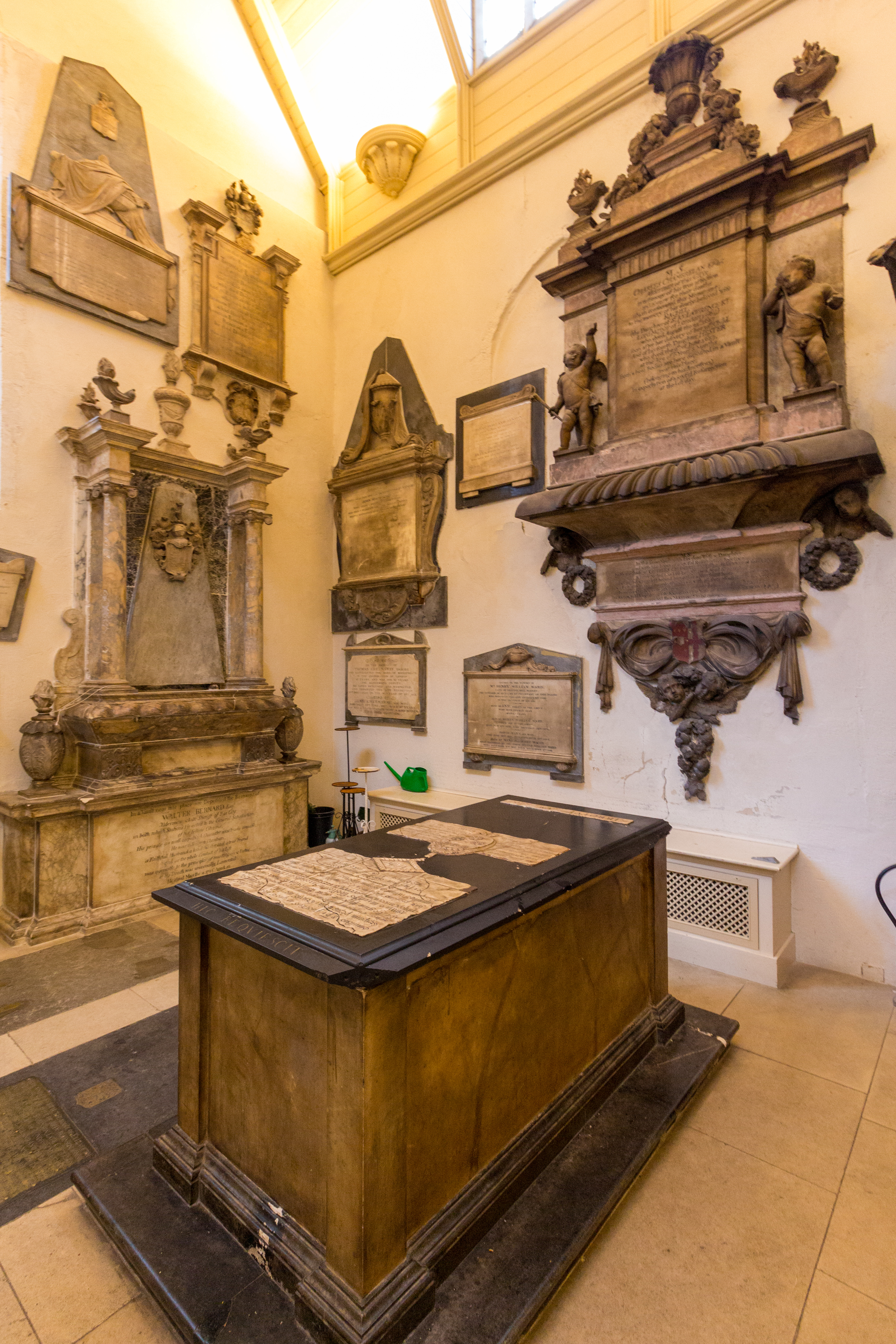
Sir Julius Caesar Adelmare memorial.

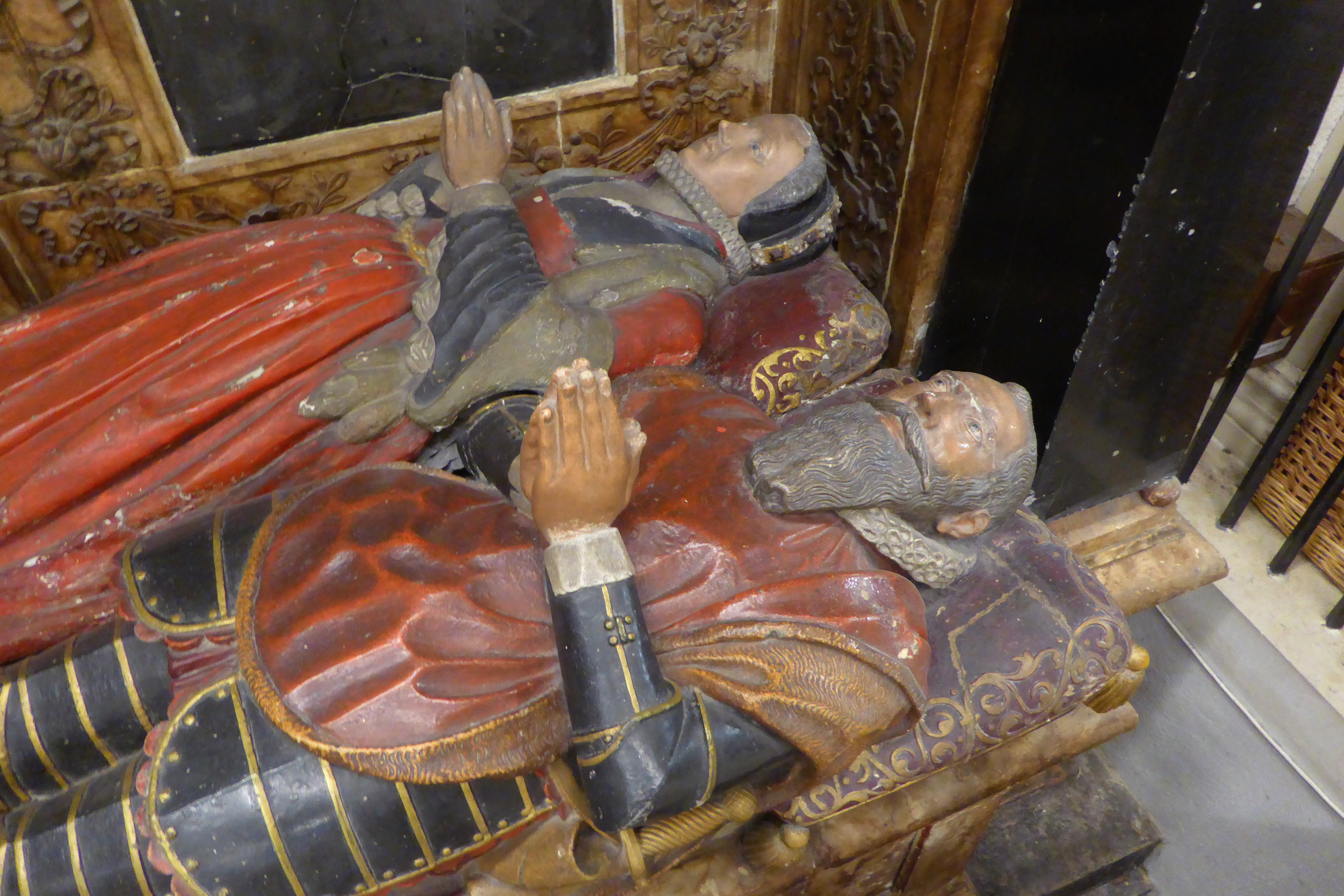
Sir John Spencer memorial

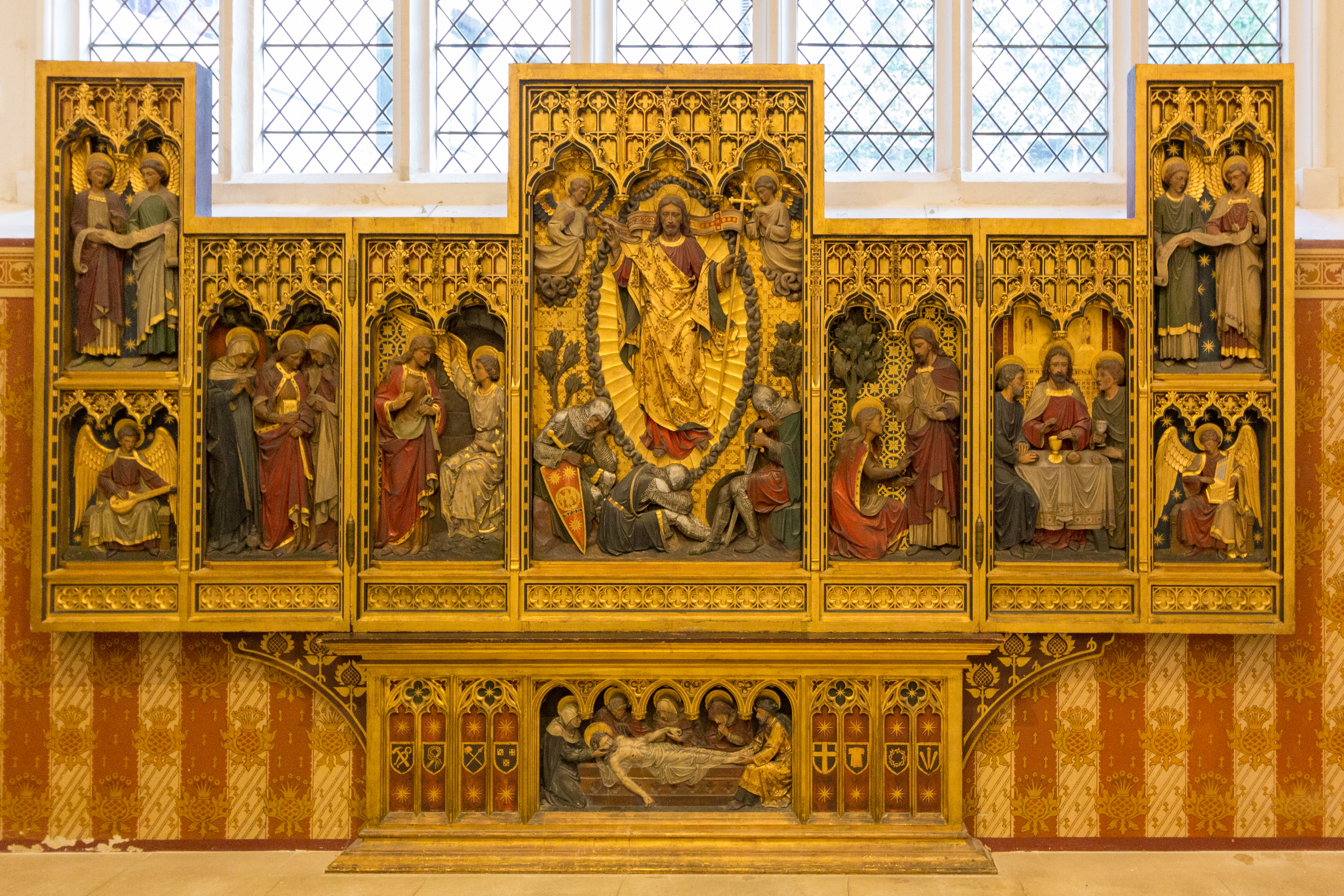
Victorian Reredos

=== Organ ===
The organ dates from 1742 when an annuity organ by Thomas Griffin was installed. It has undergone several restorations since by builders such as George Pike England in 1810, J. C. Bishop and Son in 1910 and 1923, Hill, Norman and Beard in 1929 and 1957 and Martin Goetze & Dominic Gwynn in 1996. A specification of the organ can be found on the National Pipe Organ Register.

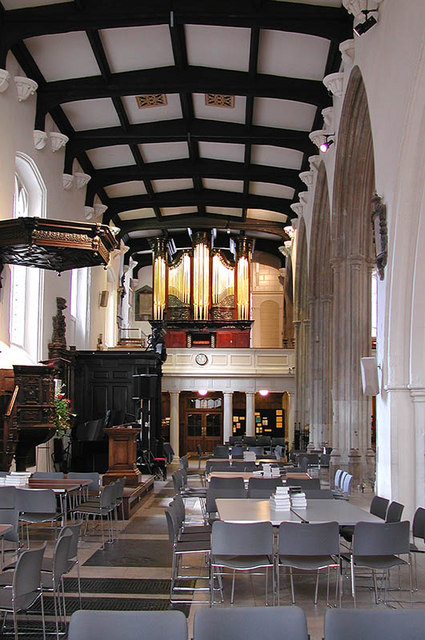
The organ on the west gallery

The organ is of historic significance and has been awarded a Grade II* listing by the British Institute of Organ Studies.

==== Organists ====
- Thomas Griffin 1744–1771
- George Griffin 1771–1809
- William Henry Cutler 1809–1819
- George Warne 1819–1820
- Joseph Nightingale 1820–1842/7?
- William Richard Bexfield 1848–1853
- Mr Deane 1854
- Scotson Clark 1855?
- William Carter 1856–1859
- Berthold Tours 1864–1865
- Miss A. Barton 1867
- Alfred T. King ?–1952
- John Henry White 1952–1965
- Richard Simpkin 1995–present

=== Burials ===
- John Crosby (died 1476)
- Robert Knollys (courtier)
- William Holles
- Richard Williams (alias Cromwell)
- Andrew Judde
- Thomas Gresham
- Sir Alberico Gentili
- Robert Hooke

== Notable ministers ==
=== Rectors ===
- 1541 John Weste
- 1571 Thomas
- 1575 John Olivar
- 1586 ? Lewis
- 1592 Nicholas Felton
- 1600 Lewis Hughes
- 1603 Richard Ball, S.T.B.
- 1613 Thomas Downing
- 1618 Thomas Evans
- 1619 William Laurence
- 1621 Joseph Browne, A.M.
- 1635 Richard Maden, S.T.B.
- 1639 Matthias Milward
- 1642 Thomas Edwards
- 1645 Samuel Willis
- 1647 Arthur Barham
- 1663 John Sybbald, A.M
- 1666 Thomas Horton, S.T.P.
- 1674 Edward Pelling, A.M
- 1678 Henry Hesketh, A.M. (nominated Bishop of Killala, 1689).
- 1695 Thomas Willis, A.M
- 1701 Samson Estwicke. S.T.B
- 1713 William Butler, LL.B. (Prebendary of St. Pauls).
- 1773 John Naish
- 1795 Robert Watts, M.A.
- 1799 James Blenkarne, M.A.
- 1835 Charles Mackenzie, M.A.
- 1847 John Thomas How Le Mesurier, M.A. (Archdeacon of Gibraltar).
- 1849 John Edmund Cox, D.D.
- 1873–1887: John Bathurst Deane
- 1887–1909: John Alfred Lumb Airey
- 1909 Silvanus Taylor Hingston Saunders, M.A.
- 1951–1953: Ronald Goodchild
- 1953–1961: John Miller
- 1961–1998: Dick Lucas
- 1998–present: William Taylor

=== Curates ===
- 1954–1958: Gordon Jones
- 1958–1960: Peter Coleman
- 1961–1967: David Macinnes
- 1970–1973: Ian Barclay
- 1973–1978: Robert Howarth
- 1976–1981: Jonathan Fletcher
- 1977–1978: Thomas Oates
- 1978–1982: James Spence
- 1982–1984: Simon Manchester
- 1985–1995: Hugh Palmer
- 1990–1995: Justin Mote
- 1994–1996: Carrie Sandom
- 1994–1998: Richard Coombs
- 1995–1998: William Taylor, now Rector
- 1995–1998: Jonathan Juckes
- 1998–2007: Nigel Beynon
- 2000–2005: Simon Dowdy
- 2002–2005: James de Costobadie
- 2003–2021: Charlie Skrine
- 2003–2007: Ben Cooper
- 2004–2011: Mark O'Donoghue
- 2004–2009: Lee Gatiss, now director of the Church Society
- 2005–present: Matt Fuller
- 2005-present: Henry Eatock Taylor
- 2007–2017: Andrew Sach
- 2007–2012: Chris Fishlock, now Senior Minister of St Nicholas Cole Abbey
- 2007–2013: Paul Clarke
- 2007–2010: Andrew Towner
- 2009–present: Aneirin Glyn
- 2009–2014: Thomas Nash
- 2010–2017: Jamie Child
- 2016–2021: Mickey Mantle
- 2019–2026: Luke Cornelius
- 2021–present: Drew Balch
- 2021–present: Phil Hudson
- 2023-Present: Paul Williams

=== Women's Workers ===
- Leonie Mason
- Mary Vander Steen
- Jessica Davison
- Claire O'Donoghue
- Sara Adamson
- Nat Lee

== Church plants ==
St Helen's has been involved in numerous church planting initiatives, some within the auspices of the Church of England, some outside of it.

Name	Location	Web	Type	Affiliation	Founded	Minister	Notes
Christ Church, Mayfair	Mayfair		Church	Diocese of London	2001	Matt Fuller	Also a Co-Mission church
St Peter's Barge	Canary Wharf		Church	Diocese of London	2003	Marcus Nodder	Britain's only church on a boat
Grace Church Dulwich	Dulwich		Church	Diocese of Southwark	2005	Simon Dowdy	Meet in a local primary school
Grace Church Wanstead	Wanstead		Church	FIEC	2006	David Gibbs	Joint plant with Christ Church Leyton. Meet in Wanstead House
Grace Church Hackney	Hackney		Church	Diocese of London	2004	Andrew Jones	Meet in St Anne's, Hoxton
Trinity Church Islington	Islington		Church	Diocese of London	2007	Jeremy Hobson	Meet in St Mark's, Myddelton Square
Euston Church	Bloomsbury		Church	Diocese of London	2010	Kev Murdoch	Since 2015 has met in Church of Christ the King, Bloomsbury
Grace Church Brockley	Brockley		Church	FIEC	2011	Raymond Brown	Meet in Crofton Park Baptist Church
Redeemer, Croydon	Croydon		Church	FIEC	2013	Will Dobbie	Joint plant with Christ Church Bromley. Meet in a local primary school
Grace Church Sydenham	Sydenham		Church	Anglican Mission in England	2015	Tim Iles	Meet in a youth centre
Grace Church Greenwich	Greenwich		Church	Diocese of Southwark	2015	Andrew Latimer	Joint plant with St Peter's Barge. Meet in Old Royal Naval College
Crossway, Stratford	Stratford		Church	Diocese of Chelmsford	2016	Jamie Child	Since 2022 meets both at School 21 Stratford and St Matthew's Church, West Ham
St Nicholas Cole Abbey	City of London		Church	Diocese of London	2016	Chris Fishlock	Sunday services restarted for first time since 1941
Clapham Junction Church	Clapham Junction		Church	Independent Anglican	2025	Tom Barnardo	Joint plant with St Nicholas Cole Abbey
Trinity Church Westminster	City of Westminster		Church	Independent Anglican	2026	Luke Cornelius	Launched on 13 September 2026
Covent Garden Talks	Covent Garden		Lunchtime talks				Meets at the Swiss Church, Endell Street
Euston Area Talks	Bloomsbury		Lunchtime talks				Meets in Church of Christ the King, Bloomsbury
Fleet Street Talks	Fleet Street		Lunchtime talks				Meets in a building on Fleet Street
London Bridge Network	London Bridge		Lunchtime talks				
Moorgate Talks	Moorgate		Lunchtime talks				
St Botolph's, Aldersgate	City of London		Lunchtime talks	Diocese of London		Simon Dowdy	Church used for lunchtime talks but not for regular services
Westminster@One	Westminster		Lunchtime talks		2000		Also a Co-Mission initiative. Meets in Methodist Central Hall

Churches planted from St Helen's (red = Church of England; blue = outside CoE)

== See also ==
- List of buildings that survived the Great Fire of London
- List of English abbeys, priories and friaries serving as parish churches
