= Co-operation Ireland =

Irish reconciliation charity

- Formation: 1979
- Legal status: Charity
- Purpose: Promoting reconciliation in Northern Ireland and the promotion of Anglo-Irish relations
- Region served: Northern Ireland, Republic of Ireland
- Patrons: King Charles III, President Michael D. Higgins
- Leader: Ian Jeffers, CEO and Sir Julian King, Chairman
- Website: http://www.cooperationireland.org

Co-operation Ireland is a non-political and non-denominational charity dedicated to peace and reconciliation in Northern Ireland and the Republic of Ireland. Much of Co-operation Ireland's work focuses on bringing the two main communities in Northern Ireland together through programmes such as the Civic-Link programme.

== Governance ==
Co-operation Ireland is a charity, run by a voluntary board under the joint patronage of King Charles III and President of Ireland Michael D. Higgins. The Chairman of Co-operation Ireland is Julian King (diplomat) former UK Ambassador to Ireland and former EU Commissioner who assumed the role in September 2023. Dr Christopher Moran is the charity's Honorary President having previously served as Chairman for 20 years. The board is supported by five sub-committees: Audit; Finance and Governance; Chairman's; Strategy and Business Development; and Communications, Marketing and Fundraising. The organisation has charitable status in both Northern Ireland and the Republic of Ireland.

== History ==
The organisation was originally named Co-operation North, and was founded in 1979 by Irish businessman Brendan O'Regan. His objectives were to promote reconciliation between the Protestant and Catholic communities in Northern Ireland and to promote dialogue and understanding between Northern Ireland and the Republic of Ireland. Queen Elizabeth II and President Mary Robinson became Co-operation North's joint patrons in 1995.

A sister organisation, Co-operation Ireland USA, was founded in 1981, and opened a Belfast office in 1982.

In 1998, following the signing of the Good Friday Agreement, Co-operation North was renamed Co-operation Ireland to reflect the all-island nature of the charity's work.

The charity became known for its annual "Maracycle" between Belfast and Dublin, first held in July 1984. Since then over 50,000 cyclists have taken part.

In 2000, a Gala Concert for Peace at Royal Albert Hall, London was held in support of Co-operation Ireland, with headline artists including The Corrs, The Saw Doctors and B*Witched participating. In 2005, Elizabeth II and President Mary McAleese attended a celebratory dinner in Crosby Hall in London to mark Co-operation Ireland's 25th anniversary. In 2012, the organisation facilitated the handshake between Elizabeth II and deputy First Minister Martin McGuinness. In 2016, Irish artist Colin Davidson presented Elizabeth II with a portrait at a Co-operation Ireland event attended by First Minister Arlene Foster and Deputy First Minister Martin McGuinness. In March 2018, Prince Harry and his fiancée, Meghan Markle, attended the organisation's Amazing the Space youth programme at the former Maze/Long Kesh prison site. The following November, President Michael D. Higgins addressed the organisation's dinner to honour the Northern Ireland and Republic of Ireland football teams ahead of a friendly match in Dublin.

== Programmes ==
Civic-Link

An education-based project which links schools on a North–South basis, and gives students an opportunity to work collaboratively on projects based around citizenship and civic responsibility.

Pride of Place

An annual competition run by Co-operation Ireland and a consortium of Local Authorities representatives known as the All-Island Local Authority Steering Forum. Through the competition, local people work together to create civic pride in their local community. The competition has a number of categories ranging from small villages to cities.

CORE (Community Outreach Reconciliation and Engagement)

A community-based project for the people of Inner East Belfast and Finglas South in Dublin. Those from Belfast come from the predominant Catholic area of Short Strand and from the predominantly Protestant area of Ballymacarrett. The project brings people from these communities together and encourages them to work with and learn from each other. The George Best Community Cup is part of the CORE project.

Irish Peace Centres

A project developed by four peace centres in Ireland – Glencree Centre for Peace and Reconciliation, the Corrymeela Community, The Donegal Centre at An Teach Ban and Co-operation Ireland.

Stelios North South Business Co-operation Awards

In 2025 Co-operation Ireland partnered with the Stelios Philanthropic Foundation to launch the inaugural North South Business Co-operation awards with a total prize fund of €500,000. The awards support entrepreneurs who are building commercial bridges between North and South helping to fuel job creation and deepen economic integration between communities.

In July 2026 it was announced the awards would return for a second year with a ceremony taking place at Castle Leslie in October 2026.

== Fundraising ==
Co-operation Ireland came to prominence through their annual Maracycle. Supporters continue to raise funds through sporting events such as the New York City Marathon and annual cycling challenge events, both in Ireland and overseas. To mark the organisation's 40th anniversary a cycle challenge from Boston to New York will take place in 2019. In addition gala dinners are held in London, Dublin and Belfast each year.
