= Thomas Griffin (organ builder) =

British organ builder and professor of music

- Born: 1706?
- Died: 29 April 1771
- Occupations: Organ builder; professor of music

Thomas Griffin (1706? – 29 April 1771) was a British organ builder and professor of music.

== Biography ==
Griffin was the son of a wharfinger. He was apprenticed on 5 July 1720 to George Dennis, a barber, for seven years; was admitted ‘by servitude’ on 4 February 1729 to the freedom, and on 6 March 1733 to the livery of the Barber-Surgeons' Company. He was entered at that date in the company's books as a ‘barber’ of Fenchurch Street (cf. Hawkins, History of Music, iii. 907). After 1751 he is described as an organ-builder, still of Fenchurch Street. Among the organs for city churches said to have been erected by Griffin is that of St. Helen's, Bishopsgate, built in 1741. Griffin was one of the Gresham committee, and succeeded Gardner, on 11 June 1763, as professor of music to the college. The performance of his duties, however, was too severe a tax upon his musical learning, and the newspapers of the time report his repeated failures as a lecturer (see also Grove, i. 631). He died on 29 April 1771, leaving property to his two sisters.
