= Christopher Moran (businessman) =

Anglo-Irish businessman (born 1948)

Dr Christopher Moran (b. 16 January 1948) is an Anglo-Irish business man who was born in North London to an Irish father and British mother. He is best known for his involvement with Co-operation Ireland, and as the owner of Crosby Moran Hall on the banks of the Thames in Chelsea, London. He also owns the Cabrach and Glenfiddich Estate in Scotland. He received an honorary degree of Doctor of Laws (LLD) from Ulster University for his contribution to civic leadership.

Christopher Moran bought Crosby Hall in 1988 for £100,000, and has created a new entrance facing the river, as well as restoring the rest of the property. The Hall was originally built in 1466 on Bishopsgate, in the City of London, and moved to its present site on Cheyne Walk in 1910. It is listed Grade II*, and was renamed Crosby Moran Hall in 2021.

Christopher Moran was appointed Honorary President of Co-operation Ireland in October 2023, having served as Chairman of that body for 20 years. Co-operation Ireland is a non-political and non-denominational charity dedicated to peace and reconciliation in Northern Ireland and the Republic of Ireland. Much of its work focuses on bringing the two main communities in Northern Ireland together through programmes such as the Civic-Link programme.
