= John Crosby (died 1476) =

Member of the Parliament of England

Sir John Crosby
- Died: 1476
- Buried: St Helen's, Bishopsgate
- Spouses: Agnes White; Anne Chedworth
- Issue: Thomas Crosby; Richard Crosby; John Crosby; John Crosby (again); Margaret Crosby; Joan Crosby
- Father: Pierce Crosby
- Mother: Emma

Sir John Crosby (died 1476) was a London merchant and alderman, diplomat and Member of Parliament. A Yorkist during the Wars of the Roses, he was knighted for his service in resisting an attack on London in 1471 by Lancastrian forces under Thomas Fauconberg. Crosby Hall, the mansion he built at Bishopsgate, was later moved to Chelsea, where it still survives.

== Family ==
John Crosby was the son of Pierce Crosby of London, from whom he inherited the manor of Hanworth, which had previously been held by his grandfather. His mother's name is Emma. In his will he mentions a cousin, Peter Christmas.

== Career ==
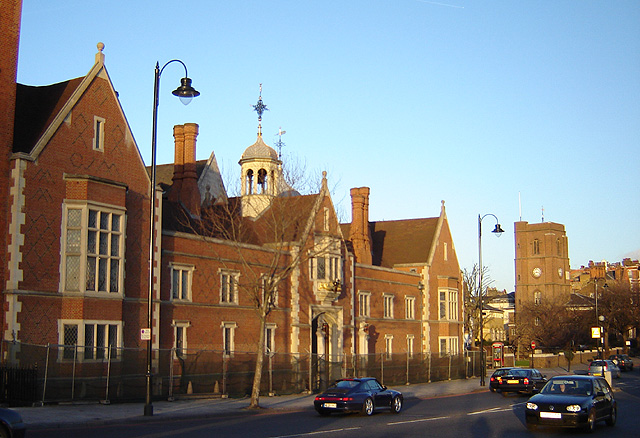
Remains of Sir John Crosby's mansion of Crosby Hall

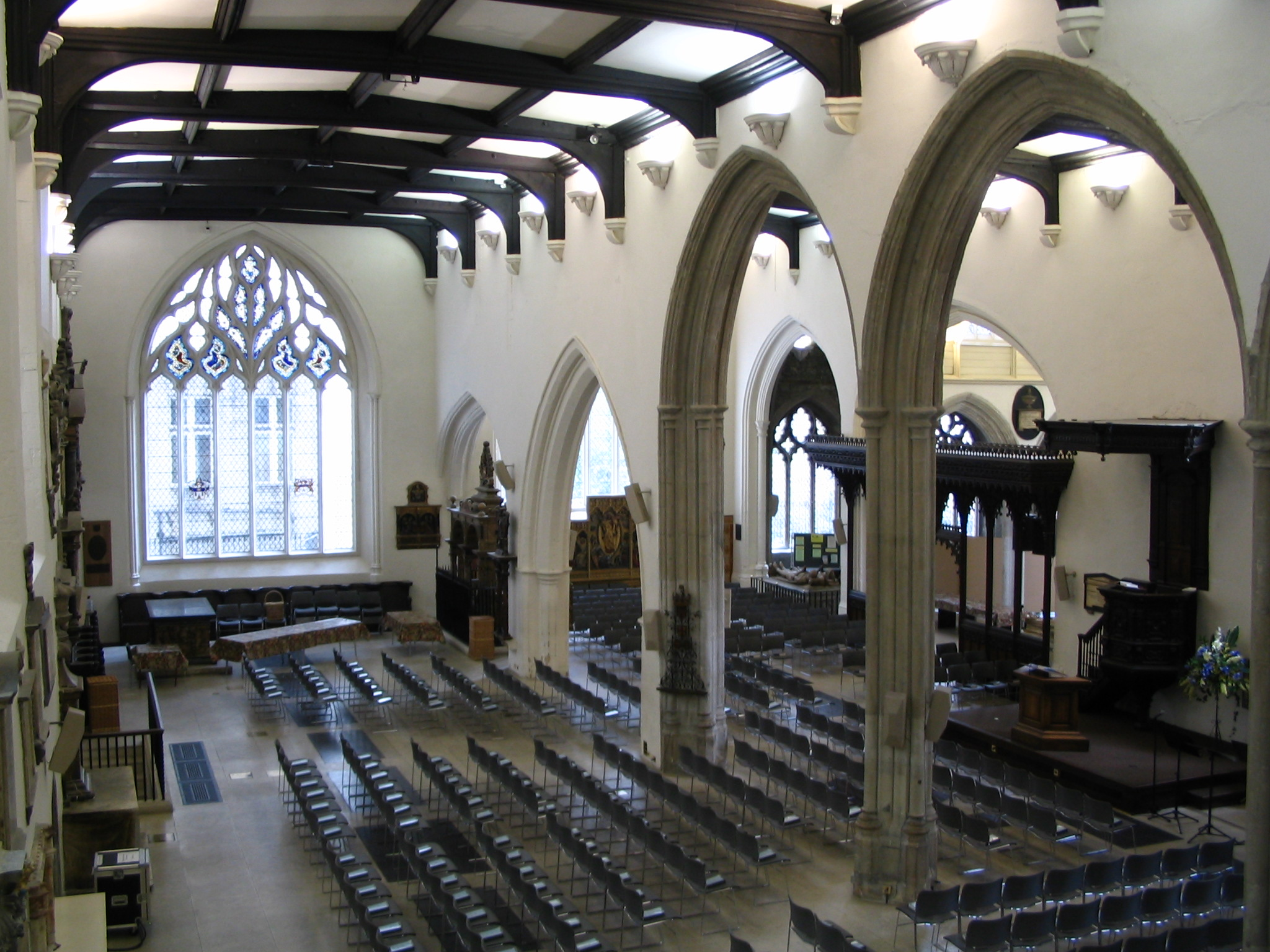
St Helen's, Bishopsgate, where Sir John Crosby was buried

As a youth Crosby was apprenticed to John Young, a member of the Worshipful Company of Grocers. He was made free of the Company in 1454, and became a wool merchant. By 1460 he was dealing on a large scale, and in 1462 was described as 'of London, grocer, Merchant of the Staple of Calais'. In 1465 his former master, John Young, accused Crosby of 'counterfeiting his seal and making a false indenture', and the quarrel between the two had to be submitted to arbitration.

By about 1469 Crosby was importing luxury fabrics, including damasks and satin, and exporting from England on Italian vessels. He was a Member of Parliament for the City of London in 1467-68, auditor from 1467-8, and alderman from 1468 until his death. In 1469 he became Master of the Grocers' Company, and in 1470 was one of the two Sheriffs of London. At about this time he was also Mayor of the Staple of Calais.

By 1466 Crosby had amassed sufficient wealth from his trading ventures to obtain a 99-year lease of land from the prioress of St Helen's Priory in Bishopsgate, and to build Crosby Hall, a house which John Stow described as ‘of stone and timber, very large and beautiful, and the highest at that time in London’. The house was later taken over by Richard III; a scene in Shakespeare's Richard III is set at Crosby Hall. In 1502 Sir Bartholomew Rede, Lord Mayor of London, kept his mayoralty there.

During the Wars of the Roses, Crosby's political sympathies were Yorkist. He is said to have influenced the decision of his fellow aldermen to commit the city of London to Edward IV, and in May 1471 he and other aldermen successfully resisted Thomas Fauconberg's attack on London Bridge, for which service he was knighted by the King at the foot of London Bridge on 21 May 1471. In accordance with the fluctuating Lancastrian and Yorkist fortunes, Crosby was pardoned four times: in April 1459 by Henry VI, in 1464 by Edward IV, on 10 February 1471 by the Readeption government of Henry VI, and again on 11 December 1471.

Crosby was one of the ambassadors sent by Edward IV to Burgundy in 1472 and to Utrecht and Bruges in May 1473 to negotiate commercial treaties.

Crosby made his will on 6 March 1471. He died five years later, in either January or February 1476, and was buried at St Helen's, Bishopsgate, where an altar tomb was erected to him and his first wife, Agnes. He and his two wives are also commemorated in a stone inscription in the steeple of All Saints church in Theydon Garnon, Essex.

In his will, proved 6 February 1476, Crosby left cash bequests amounting to over £3200, in addition to lands and merchandise. His widow, Anne, was bequeathed £2000, while his daughter, Joan, was to inherit his manor of Hanworth. He also left £100 for the repair of London Bridge, and a further £100 for the repair of Bishopsgate and the adjoining parts of London wall. Crosby's manor of Hanworth was later acquired by Henry VIII, while early in the twentieth century his former mansion in Bishopgate, Crosby Hall, was moved to Chelsea, where 'it remains the only extant example of domestic architecture built for a London merchant in the Middle Ages'. The former site of Crosby Hall in Bishopsgate is now occupied by Tower 42.

Crosby's arms were Sable, a chevron ermine between three rams trippant Argent, armed and hoofed Or.

== Marriages and issue ==
Crosby married firstly a wife named Agnes (d.1466) whose surname is unknown, by whom, according to the inscription on his monument as recorded by Weever, he had four sons, Thomas, Richard, John, John (again), and two daughters, Margaret and Joan:

Orate pro animabus Johannis Crosby, militis, ald. atque tempore vite maioris staple ville Caleis; & Agnetis vxoris sue, ac Thome, Richardi, Johannis, Johannis, Margarete & Johanne liberorum eiusdem Johannis Crosby, militis, ille obiit, 1475, & illa 1466, quorum animabus propitietur Deus.

Crosby married secondly Anne Chedworth, the daughter of William Chedworth, Clerk of the Common Council of London, uncle of Margaret (née Chedworth), second wife of John Howard, 1st Duke of Norfolk. After Crosby's death, his widow is said to have married John Rogers, esquire.

Crosby's only surviving child when he made his will in 1471 was an unmarried daughter, Joan. In Crosby's will she is referred to as Joan Crosby, otherwise Talbot, and it has been said that 'the alternative surname suggests that she may have been a natural child'. It is thought that she died between 1471, when Crosby made his will, and his death in 1476.
