= Maria Hackett =

English philanthropist

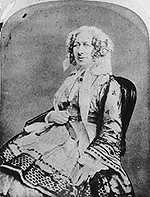
- Born: 14 November 1783; Birmingham, England
- Died: 5 November 1874 (aged 90); Hackney, England
- Other names: "The Chorister's Friend"
- Known for: looking after the welfare of choristers

Maria Hackett (14 November 1783 – 5 November 1874) was an English philanthropist. She took an interest in the welfare of choristers starting at those at St Paul's Cathedral. When she died she was recognised as "The Chorister's Friend".

== Early life ==
Hackett was born in Birmingham in 1783. Her parents were Grace and Joseph Hackett, but her father died when she was four and her stepfather was Samuel Capper. He too died in 1790 and her mother moved her and her half brothers to London. There they were taken in by her stepfather's brother, George Capper.

== The Chorister's Friend ==
Hackett found her life's work when she took her seven year old orphan cousin, Henry Wintle, to become a chorister at St Paul's Cathedral. She was appalled by the conditions that choristers were placed under. Further investigation revealed that the choristers would be hired out for singing engagements and the choir masters would pocket the money.

Hackett wrote to the Bishop about her concerns but the reply was merely reassuring and no action was promised. Hackett then wrote to others who could take an interest and included details of the relevant history of the choir which she had investigated. She was able to show that various people within the cathedral's organisation had a duty to perform towards the choir. There was still no action so she decided to take the matter to court. Hackett and George Capper realised that the cost of the court case was too large and she had to withdraw. Hackett's interest in choirs was gaining both depth and breadth and she began to study other English and Welsh choirs. Her research resulted in the publication in 1827 of "Brief account of cathedral and collegiate schools with an abstract of their statutes and endowments".

In 1828 she published A Popular Description of St. Paul's Cathedral: Including a Brief History of the Old and New Cathedral: with Explanations of the Monumental Designs.

In 1835-36, a campaign was launched to save the ancient hall of Crosby Hall in London, which had begun to show signs of decay. A Committee chaired by Alderman W. T. Copeland, M.P., then Lord Mayor of London raised a small sum. However, the majority of the funds needed were provided by Hackett, who took over the lease at her expense. Hackett assumed all liabilities, oversaw the laying of stones for an adjoining council chamber, and funded the removal of the inserted floor.

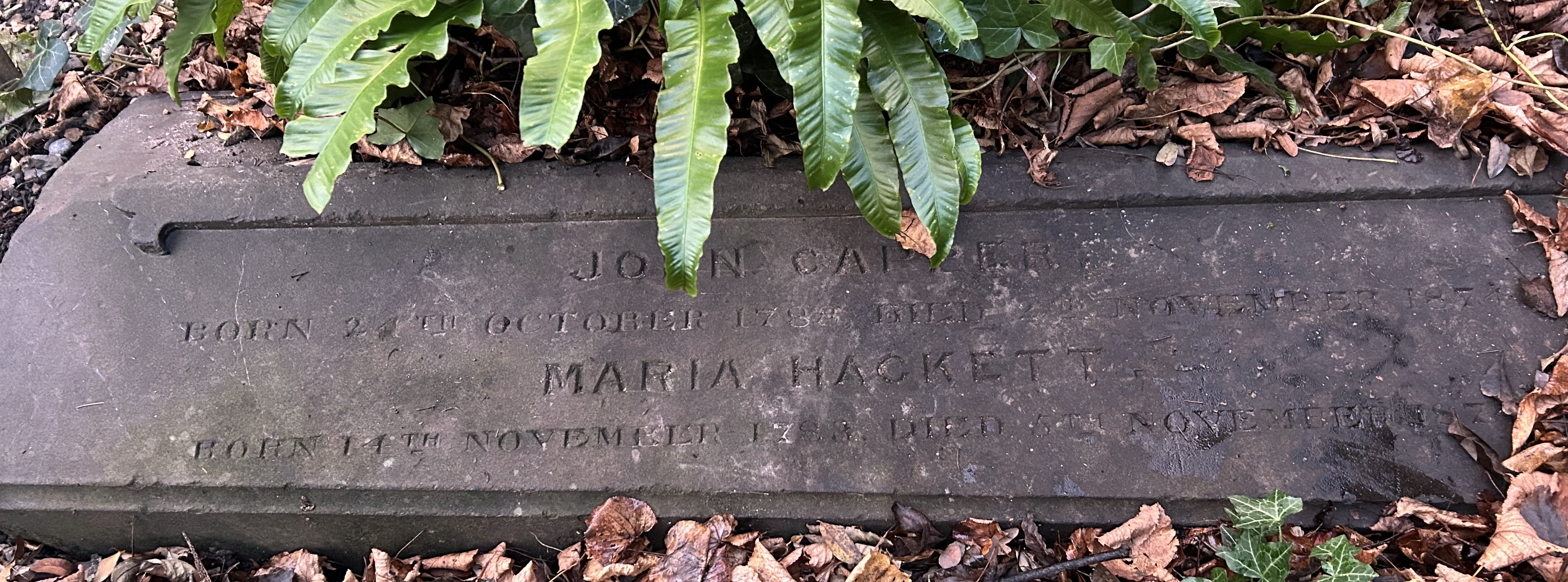
Grave of Maria Hackett in Highgate Cemetery

== Death and legacy ==
Hackett died, aged 90, where she was living in Hackney on 5 November 1874 and was buried in Highgate Cemetery. She was known as "The Chorister's Friend" and the nation's choristers paid for a memorial cenotaph to be created in St Paul's cathedral after her death. St Paul's Cathedral celebrated the 150th anniversary of her death in November 2024 with a dramatisation of her campaign for choristers' rights.
