= Dora Ilse =

German entomologist

Dorothea "Dora" Ilse (9 October 1898 – 21 October 1979) was a German entomologist who researched color identification in butterflies.

== Personal life ==
Ilse was born in Honnef am Rhein, Germany. She completed her school education in Berlin, then moving to Göttingen and later to Bonn. She returned to Berlin in 1931, before moving to Munich in 1933. In 1935 she relocated to Britain in exile, where she lived until 1952 and taught biology in schools. Ilse then moved to Pune, India, where she remained until 1955. Her whereabouts from 1955 until her death in Munich in 1979 are unknown.

== Career ==
Ilse received her PhD from the University of Göttingen. From there she relocated to Bonn to work as a Scientific Assistant at the hereditary biological archive in Bonn. She returned to Berlin in 1931, as a Scientific Guest Researcher at the Kaiser Wilhelm Institute for Biology in Berlin Dahlem. She expected to move to Munich to work for the Munich Zoological Institute at the end of 1933, upon invitation by soon-to-be Nobel Prize-winner Karl von Frisch. However, the discriminatory law “On the Restoration of the Civil Service,” of 7 April 1933 prevented her from doing so on account of her Jewish origins. Ilse instead took up a position as an assistant at the Zoological Institute, alongside which she undertook unpaid work producing educational films. In 1935 she moved in exile to Britain, where she lived until 1952, teaching biology in schools. She also published articles in Nature and Proceedings of the Royal Philosophical Society of Glasgow, and in 1938–39 gave a series of lectures in the United States of America, supplemented by her scientific films. Ilse resumed her activity as a zoologist between 1952 and 1955, at the University of Pune, India, where she helped to establish the Zoological Institute.

== Research ==
Ilse studied aspects of animal behavior, including animal navigation, in butterflies. Her research had a particular focus on the great spangled fritillary (Argynnis aglaja). Through her observations, she noted butterflies' preference for blue, crimson, and violet flowers. Ilse's research proved that butterflies have a sense of color, and that most butterflies discover flowers on their first approach through their color and scent. Her experiments also showed that butterflies, like other insects, can be trained.
