= Gertrud Kornfeld =

German chemist (1891–1955)

- Born: July 25, 1891; Prague, Austro-Hungarian Empire
- Died: July 4, 1955 (aged 63); Rochester, New York, U.S.A.
- Education: Karl-Ferdinands-Universität, Friedrich-Wilhelms-Universität
- Known for: Photochemistry
- Scientific career
- Workplaces: Karl-Ferdinands-Universität, Königliche Technische Hochschule, Friedrich-Wilhelms-Universität, Eastman Kodak Company

Gertrud Kornfeld (July 25, 1891, in Prague – July 4, 1955, in Rochester, New York) was a German chemist. She was the first and only woman to become a Privatdozent in chemistry in the Weimar Republic.

After the Nazis banned Jews from holding academic positions in Germany in 1933, she moved to England and then to the United States where she worked for the Eastman Kodak Company. Her main areas of research were photochemistry and reaction kinetics.

== Education ==
Gertrud Kornfeld grew up in a middle-class German-speaking Jewish household in Prague, which was at that time part of the Austro-Hungarian Empire. She studied chemistry from 1910 to 1915, at the German school of the Karl-Ferdinands-Universität in Prague. She received her doctorate in 1915 with the dissertation Über Hydrate in Lösungen (On hydrates in solutions) and was employed as an assistant to her advisor Victor Rothmund. She worked first as a demonstrator, and from 1914 to 1918 as an assistant.

== Germany ==
In October 1918, at the end of World War I, Czechoslovakia was formed as one of the countries succeeding the Austro-Hungarian Empire. Kornfeld left Prague in 1919 and got a job as a trainee assistant to Max Bodenstein at the Königliche Technische Hochschule in Hannover, (later the Technical University of Hanover).

In 1923, Kornfeld moved with Bodenstein to the Institute of Physical Chemistry at Friedrich-Wilhelms-Universität (later the Humboldt University of Berlin). In 1928 Gertrud Kornfeld habilitated in chemistry in Berlin. She was the first and only woman to become a Privatdozent in chemistry at a university in the Weimar Republic.

On April 7, 1933, the Law for the Restoration of the Professional Civil Service in Germany was passed, banning Jews from holding public positions, including teaching positions. Along with nearly one-third of the University of Berlin's teaching staff and nearly half of its private lecturers, Kornfeld was deprived of her teaching license and any further possibility of employment in German academia.

== England ==
Kornfeld was able to emigrate to England in 1933. She apparently received some assistance from the Society for the Protection of Science and Learning (SPSL) at the University of Birmingham. The SPSL, which was initially known as the Academic Assistance Council, formed in London in 1933. Kornfeld was on the List of Displaced German Scholars compiled by the SPSL and published in 1936.

She also received support from the British Federation of University Women (BFUW) in London to teach at the University of Nottingham. In 1934 she received an emergency German Scholar Residential Fellowship for a year, from a fund raised by the BFUW specifically for German exiles. This allowed her to do research at the Imperial College London in South Kensington. In 1936, she received an International Fellowship from the American Association of University Women (AAUW), enabling her to study in Vienna.

== United States ==
Relocation, for younger women, was perhaps easier. Kornfeld was older and better established in her field in 1933. Even with positive recommendations from Max Bodenstein and physicist Friedrich Paschen, it was difficult for her to find a new position at her level and in her specialization. She initially resisted the idea of teaching at a women's college, or going into industrial research.

In 1937, Esther Brunauer of the AAUW vouched for Kornfeld, enabling her to travel on a visitor visa to the United States. There she found a position in the research laboratory of the Eastman Kodak Company in Rochester, New York. Her specialized knowledge of photochemistry was valued, and she became head of a small research group. She was able to continue her career successfully in spite of the repeated political upheavals that had affected her. In 1948, Kornfeld was honored as a fellow of the New York Academy of Sciences, for her work at Kodak.
