= Ellis Gowing =

Ellis Norman Gowing (24 April 1883 – 2 March 1960) was Archdeacon of Southend from 1938 until 1953.

Gowing was educated at Fort Street High School and the University of Sydney; and ordained in 1907. He began his career as a Curate at The Oaks, New South Wales, after which he served at Armidale Cathedral. Coming to England he was on the staff of St James the Less, Bethnal Green then domestic chaplain to the Bishop of Chelmsford from 1914 to 1917. He was vicar of Prittlewell from 1917 until his death; an honorary canon of Chelmsford Cathedral from 1921 to 1938 and Rural Dean of Canewdon from 1918 to 1938. He was given the Freedom of the County Borough of Southend-on-Sea in 1954.

Church of England titles
Preceded by Percy Bayne	Archdeacon of Southend; 1938–1953	Succeeded by Neville Welch
