= Elwin Cockett =

British Anglican priest and chaplain

The Venerable Elwin Cockett
- Archdeacon of West Ham
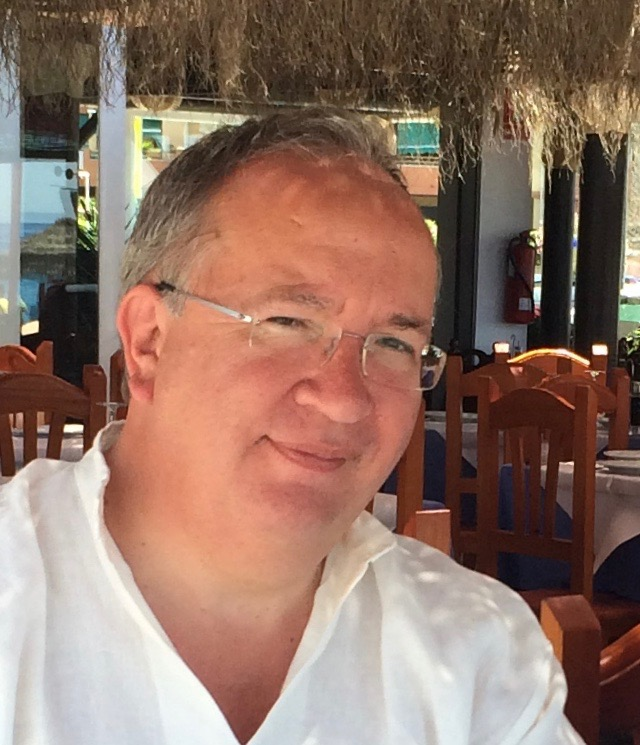
- Church: Church of England
- Diocese: Chelmsford
- In office: 2007 to 2024
- Predecessor: Michael Fox
- Other post: Chaplain to West Ham United (1992–2012)

Orders
- Ordination: 1991 (deacon); 1992 (priest)

Personal details
- Born: Elwin Wesley Cockett; 24 May 1959 (age 67) India
- Denomination: Anglicanism
- Spouse: Sue
- Children: Three
- Education: Akosombo International School; Malmesbury Primary School; St Paul's Cathedral School; Forest School, Walthamstow
- Alma mater: Oak Hill College

Elwin Wesley Cockett (born 24 May 1959) is a British Anglican priest and chaplain. From October 2007 to September 2024 he was the Archdeacon of West Ham in the Diocese of Chelmsford.

Cockett grew up in India, Ghana and England. He was educated at St Paul's Cathedral School and was a chorister at St Paul's Cathedral, at Akosombo International School in Ghana, and at Forest School, Walthamstow. He trained for ordination at the Aston Training Scheme and studied theology at Oak Hill College, a Conservative Evangelical theological college, though Cockett himself identifies more with the Open Evangelical tradition.

Having been ordained in the Church of England, Cockett served his curacy at St Chad's Church, Chadwell Heath from 1991 to 1994. He then moved to St Paul's Church, Harold Hill, where he was successively an assistant curate (1994–1995), priest-in-charge (1995–1997), and vicar (1997–2000). He was Team Rector of Billericay and Little Burstead from 2000 to 2007, and Rural Dean of Basildon from 2004 to 2007. Additionally, he was Chaplain to West Ham United F.C. between 1992 and 2012, and also a chaplain to the athletes competing in 2012 Summer Olympics.

== Early life and education ==
Cockett was born on 24 May 1959 in Kotagiri, Tamil Nadu, in India, where his father was working as a missionary doctor. He was brought up in India, Somerset, Ghana, and East London.

Cockett was educated at the primary department of Akosombo International School, then a mostly expatriate school in Ghana, and then at Malmesbury Primary School in East London. Between 1968 and 1972, he was educated at St Paul's Cathedral School, a private preparatory school in the City of London; during this time he was a chorister at St Paul's Cathedral. From 1973 to 1977, he was educated at Forest School, then an all-boys independent school in Walthamstow, London, where he held a music scholarship.

After completing his schooling, Cockett worked for HM Civil Service and the National Health Service. He worked at the Inland Revenue for five years, and then became the Practice Manager of the Bethnal Green Medical Mission, a GP surgery in London. It was during the latter job that he began to explore his call to ordination.

== Ordained ministry ==
In 1986, Cockett entered the Aston Training Scheme to prepare for ordination. This was a two-year part-time scheme that was led by Laurie Green and aimed to prepare its students for theological college. He studied theology at Oak Hill College, a Conservative Evangelical theological college in London, and graduated with a Bachelor of Arts (BA) degree in 1991.

Cockett was ordained in the Church of England as a deacon on 30 June 1991 by John Waine, the Bishop of Chelmsford, and as a priest in 1992. From 1991 to 1994, he served his curacy at St Chad's Church, Chadwell Heath, an Evangelical church in the Diocese of Chelmsford. In 1994, he joined St Paul's Church, Harold Hill. He served as an assistant curate from 1994 to 1995, as priest-in-charge from 1995 to 1997, and then vicar. In 2000, he became Team Rector of Billericay and Little Burstead. From June 2004, he was also the Rural Dean of Basildon.

In addition to his parish ministry, Cockett worked as a chaplain. For 20 years, from 1992 to 2012, he was Chaplain to West Ham United F.C. During the 2012 Summer Olympics held in London, he was chosen as one of the 193 multi-faith chaplains, and he ministered to the athletes and officials of the games.

In June 2007, it was announced that Cockett would be the next Archdeacon of West Ham. He took up the appointment in October 2007 in succession to Michael Fox. His archdeaconry originally covered the London boroughs of Barking and Dagenham, Havering, Newham, Redbridge, and Waltham Forest; since the creation of the Archdeaconry of Barking in 2013, it has covered Newham, Redbridge, and Waltham Forest. In September 2014, he additionally became the Chair of the Chelmsford Diocesan Board of Education which oversees 140 church schools.

Though he attended a Conservative Evangelical theological college, Cockett has identified himself within the Open Evangelical tradition of the Church of England.

On 5 June 2024, it was announced that Cockett intended to retire on 30 September. He retired as Archdeacon of West Ham at the end of September 2024 and now lives in Somerset.

== Other work ==
Outside of his ordained ministry, Cockett was involved in charity work and was a school governor. He was a trustee of Aston Mansfield, a charity centred on the London Borough of Newham. He was also a trustee of The Reverend Doctor George Richards' Charity For Poor Clergymen, a charity that assists Church of England clergy who have retired early due to ill health and their families. from 2011 to 2024 he was a governor of Forest School, Walthamstow.

== Personal life ==
Cockett is married to Sue, who he met while he was performing in a play at Forest School. Together, they have three children; Sarah, Rachel, and the opera singer Thomas Elwin.

Cockett is a fan of West Ham United F.C. He is a keen musician, having held a music scholarship at Forest School and having been a boy chorister at St Paul's Cathedral. He was a member of the Dry Bones Band that played occasionally "at events in Chelmsford Cathedral". He is also interested in motorcycling.
