= Dean of Southwark =

Church of England senior clergy member

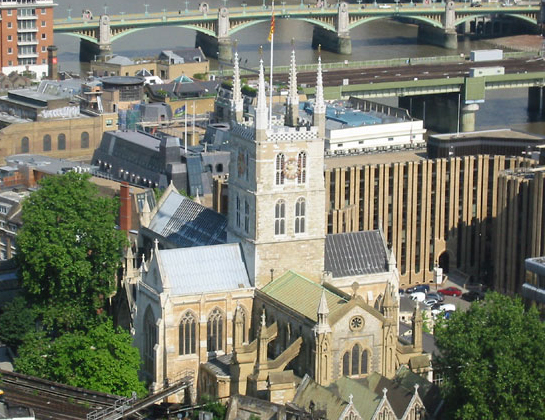
Southwark Cathedral

The Dean of Southwark is the head (primus inter pares – first among equals) and chair of the chapter of canons, the ruling body of Southwark Cathedral. The dean and chapter are based at the Cathedral and Collegiate Church of Saint Saviour and Saint Mary Overie in Southwark. Before 2000 the post was designated as a provost, which was then the equivalent of a dean at most English cathedrals. The cathedral is the mother church of the Anglican Diocese of Southwark and seat of the Bishop of Southwark. The current dean Mark Oakley, was installed on 3 December 2023.

== List of deans ==
=== Provosts ===
- 1937–1938 John Haldane
- 1939–1941 Frederick Narborough
- 1944–1947 Cuthbert Bardsley
- 1948–1957 Hugh Ashdown
- 1957–1961 George Reindorp
- 1961–1970 Ernest Southcott
- 1970–1982 Harold Frankham
- 1983–1994 David Edwards
- 1994–2000 Colin Slee (became Dean)

=== Deans ===
- 2000–November 2010 Colin Slee
- 21 January 2012 – 4 July 2023 Andrew Nunn
- 2023 - present Mark Oakley
