= Annette Cooper =

British Church of England priest

The Reverend Annette Cooper
- Archdeacon of Colchester
- Diocese: Diocese of Chelmsford
- In office: 2004–2018
- Predecessor: Martin Wallace
- Other posts: Acting Archdeacon of Stansted (2013); House of Bishops Regional Representative for East Anglia (2013–2016)

Orders
- Ordination: 3 July 1988 (deacon) by David Bartleet; 31 May 1994 (priest) by Patrick Harris

Personal details
- Born: 15 November 1953 (age 72)
- Denomination: Anglican
- Residence: Witham, Essex
- Parents: Harry Whitaker & Grace Whitaker
- Spouse: Andrew Cooper (m. 1972)
- Children: 2
- Profession: Social work

Annette Joy Cooper (born 15 November 1953) is a retired British Church of England priest. She was the Archdeacon of Colchester (in the Diocese of Chelmsford) from 2004 until 2018.

== Early life ==
Cooper was born on 15 November 1953, the daughter of Harry Whitaker and Grace (née Parnham, later James). She was educated at Lilley and Stone Girls' High School, then an all-girls grammar school in Newark-on-Trent.

From 1979 to 1988, Cooper worked as a social worker. In 1980, she completed a Bachelor of Arts degree from the Open University. She gained a number of social work qualifications, including a Certificate of Qualification in Social Work (CQSW) and, in 1985, a Diploma in Social Work (DipSW). She left her first vocation upon ordination.

== Ordained ministry ==
Having trained with the Southwark Ordination Course, Cooper was ordained a deacon on 3 July 1988 at Rochester Cathedral by David Bartleet, Bishop of Tonbridge. She then became a non-stipendiary minister at St Peter, Pembury and simultaneously a full-time assistant chaplain in the Tunbridge Wells health authority until 1991. From 1991 to 1996, she was a full-time chaplain at Bassetlaw Hospital. On 31 May 1994, she was ordained a priest by Patrick Harris (the then Bishop of Southwell) at St Anne's Church, Worksop; 1994 was the first year that women were able to be priested in the Church of England.

In 1996, Cooper moved to become priest-in-charge of St Mary's, Edwinstowe, where she was also a chaplain at Center Parcs Sherwood Forest (until 2000), area dean of the Worksop deanery (from 1999) and an honorary canon of Southwell Minster (from 2002).

In 2004, Cooper became Archdeacon of Colchester in the Diocese of Chelmsford, in which role she was also made an honorary canon of Chelmsford Cathedral. When her archdeaconry was split on 1 February 2013, she became (additionally) Acting Archdeacon of Stansted until the first incumbent of that post (Robin King) was collated on 15 September 2013.

During 2013, Cooper was elected by and from among the female "senior priests" of the East Anglia region to attend meetings (as 'participant observers') of the House of Bishops as one of eight Regional Representatives, as an interim measure until six women sit in the House by right. She served until that arrangement was ended in December 2016.

Cooper retired during November 2018.

== Personal life ==
In 1972, the then Annette Whitaker married Andrew Cooper. Together, they have two sons and four grandchildren.

== Styles ==
- 1988–2002 & 2018–present: The Reverend Annette Cooper
- 2002–2004: The Reverend Canon Annette Cooper
- 2004–2018: The Venerable Annette Cooper

== Sources ==
- "Cooper, Annette Joy". Who's Who. Vol. 2015 (November 2014 online ed.). A & C Black. (Subscription or UK public library membership required.)

Church of England titles
Preceded by Martin Wallace	Archdeacon of Colchester; 2004–2018	Ruth Patten
