= Percy Bayne =

Percy Matheson Bayne (11 June 1865 – 11 October 1942) was the first Archdeacon of Southend, serving from 1922 until 1938.

Bayne was born into an ecclesiastical family in South Weald, educated at Highgate School and Hertford College, Oxford and ordained in 1889. He began his career with curacies at St Michael and All Angels, Walthamstow and Holy Trinity, Canning Town before being in charge of the St Augustine's Mission, Leytonstone. He was Rector of Little Ilford from 1894 to 1913; Rural Dean of Barking from 1912 to 1914; Clerical Secretary of the London-over-the-Border Church Fund from 1914 to 1922; an Honorary Canon of Chelmsford Cathedral from 1914 to his appointment as Archdeacon; Honorary Chaplain to the Bishop of Chelmsford from 1917 to 1922; and Clerical Secretary of the Diocesan Funds from 1922 to 1928.

Church of England titles
| Preceded by Inaugural appointment | Archdeacon of Southend; 1922–1938 | Succeeded by Ellis Gowing |
