= John Wraw =

British Anglican bishop (1959–2017)

The Right Reverend John Wraw
- Bishop of Bradwell
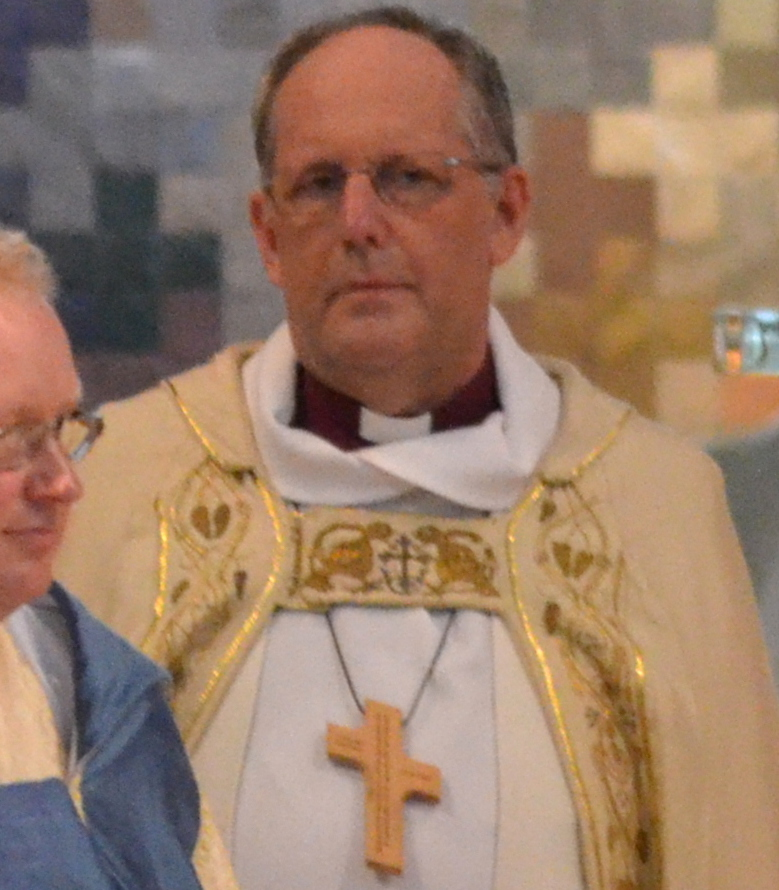
- Wraw in 2014
- Church: Church of England
- Diocese: Diocese of Chelmsford
- In office: 2012–2017
- Predecessor: Laurie Green
- Successor: John Perumbalath
- Other post: Archdeacon of Wilts (2004–2012)

Orders
- Ordination: 30 June 1985 (deacon) by John Eastaugh; 29 June 1986 (priest) by Mark Wood
- Consecration: 25 January 2012 by Rowan Williams

Personal details
- Born: 4 February 1959 Hampshire, United Kingdom
- Died: 25 July 2017 (aged 58) Horndon-on-the-Hill, Essex, England
- Denomination: Anglican
- Spouse: Gillian (m. 1981)
- Children: 4

John Michael Wraw (4 February 1959 – 25 July 2017) was a British Anglican bishop. He served as the Bishop of Bradwell, an area bishop in the Church of England Diocese of Chelmsford, from 2012 until his death in post in July 2017.

== Early life and education ==
Wraw was born on 4 February 1959 in Hampshire, UK. He studied law at Lincoln College, Oxford and then trained for the Anglican ministry at Fitzwilliam College and Ridley Hall in Cambridge.

== Ordained ministry ==
Wraw was ordained in the Church of England: made a deacon at Petertide 1985 (30 June) by John Eastaugh, Bishop of Hereford, and as a priest the Petertide following (29 June 1986) by Mark Wood, Bishop of Ludlow — both times at Hereford Cathedral. His first pastoral appointment was as a curate at Bromyard, Herefordshire. He then moved to South Yorkshire as the Team Vicar of Sheffield Manor (1988–1992), Vicar of St James' Church, Clifton (1992–2001) and Priest-in-Charge of Wickersley (2001–2004). While at Wickersley, he was chair of the Diocesan Faith and Justice Committee and served as chair of Voluntary Action Rotherham. Also during that period, he was Area Dean of Rotherham (1998–2004) and an honorary canon of Sheffield Cathedral (2001–2004). From 2004, he was the Archdeacon of Wilts and has been the chair of the Wiltshire Local Strategic Partnership.

=== Episcopal ministry ===
Wraw's nomination to become the suffragan Bishop of Bradwell was announced on 26 July 2011, in succession to Laurie Green who resigned on 28 February 2011. On 25 January 2012, he was consecrated a bishop by Rowan Williams, the then Archbishop of Canterbury, during a service at St Paul's Cathedral in London. He was installed as Bishop of Bradwell by Stephen Cottrell, the Bishop of Chelmsford, during a service at Chelmsford Cathedral on 29 January 2012.

In February 2017, with his cancer becoming terminal, he announced his plans to continue his full-time episcopal ministry until Easter and then move onto a lighter schedule until his health no longer allowed him to continue.

=== Views ===
Wraw supported the ordination of women as deacons, priests, and bishops. In February 2017, he announced his support for same-sex marriage, calling for the "proper recognition through prayers, blessing, celebration and affirmation of all that is good and wholesome in a wide variety of relationships including stable, faithful, committed and God given same sex relationships".

== Personal life ==
Wraw married Gillian in 1981 and they had four children; his interests included the theatre and walking, and he was also a crew member in the 2009–2010 Clipper Round the World Yacht Race.

=== Health and death ===
In June 2014, Wraw announced that he had been diagnosed with Multiple Myeloma and was about to undergo intense chemotherapy treatments. He later took a temporary hiatus from his duties in order to concentrate on his treatment. Almost a year after his diagnosis, Wraw announced that his myeloma was in remission after he underwent a stem cell transplant, and that he would be fully resuming his duties as bishop.

In February 2017, Wraw announced that his cancer was no longer treatable and he was receiving palliative care. He continued his ministry until his health no longer permitted him.

Wraw died (still in post) in his sleep at his home in Essex in the early hours of 25 July 2017. His funeral Eucharist was held at Chelmsford Cathedral on 7 August.

== Styles ==
For further information on forms of address ("styles") traditionally given to clergy of the Church of England, see Crockford's Clerical Directory and forms of address in the United Kingdom.
Regardless of their formal style(s), a person may choose which styles to use or not use.

- The Reverend John Wraw (1985–2001)
- The Reverend Canon John Wraw (2001–2004)
- The Venerable John Wraw (2004–2012)
- The Right Reverend John Wraw (2012–2017)
