= Andrew Nunn =

British Anglican priest

The Very Reverend Andrew Nunn SCP
- Dean of Southwark
- Church: Church of England
- Diocese: Diocese of Southwark
- In office: 2012–2023
- Predecessor: Colin Slee
- Successor: Mark Oakley
- Other post: Sub Dean of Southwark Cathedral (1999–2012)

Orders
- Ordination: 1983 (deacon); 1984 (priest)

Personal details
- Born: Andrew Peter Nunn; 30 July 1957 (age 69) Wigston Magna, Leicestershire, United Kingdom
- Denomination: Anglicanism
- Education: Leicester Polytechnic; Leeds University; College of the Resurrection, Mirfield

Andrew Peter Nunn SCP (born 30 July 1957) is a British retired Anglican priest. Before retirement, he served as Dean of Southwark in the Church of England.

== Early life ==
Nunn was born on 30 July 1957 in Wigston Magna, Leicestershire. From 1975 to 1979, he studied public administration at Leicester Polytechnic, graduating with a Bachelor of Arts (BA (Hons)) degree. He then worked for a year as a rent collector for the Housing Department of Wellingborough Borough Council in Northamptonshire.

In 1980, he entered the College of the Resurrection, Mirfield, to train for ordination. During this time, he also studied theology and religious studies at the University of Leeds and graduated with a Bachelor of Arts (BA) degree in 1982.

== Ordained ministry ==
Nunn was ordained in the Church of England, made a deacon in 1983 during a service at Ripon Cathedral. He was ordained a priest at Petertide 1984 (1 July) by David Young, Bishop of Ripon, at Ripon Cathedral. Between 1983 and 1987, he served his curacy at St James the Great, Manston, Leeds. He was then chaplain of Agnes Stewart Church of England High School and curate then vicar at (All Saints') Richmond Hill.

From 1995 to 1999, Nunn was chaplain and personal assistant to Roy Williamson, Bishop of Southwark. From 1999, he was a residentiary canon of Southwark Cathedral. From 1999 to 2000, he was vice-provost and precentor. In 2000, all primae inter pares of cathedral clergy became known as deans; previously some heads of chapters were titled provost while some were titled dean. Therefore, from 2000 to 2012, he was sub-dean and precentor at Southwark Cathedral. On 21 January 2012, he was installed as Dean of Southwark.

Nunn has been an elected member of the General Synod of the Church of England since 2005. He was chaplain to the Synod from 2011 to 2012, and has been a member of its Panel of Chairs since 2016.

From 2008 to 2017 Nunn was Rector General of the Society of Catholic Priests. He is Chaplain General of the Company of Servers, an Anglican society for lay people that is connected to the Society of Catholic Priests.

Nunn is an honorary chaplain of a number of livery companies of the City of London. Since 2000, he has been an honorary chaplain of the Launderers' Company. He is also an honorary chaplain of the Innholders' Company, as well as a member of the Glaziers' Company.

Nunn retired effective 4 July 2023. At his Diocesan Farewell service he was appointed Dean Emeritus of Southwark by the Bishop of Southwark.

== Personal life ==
Nunn is gay. Having been together with his partner for 36 years, they entered into a civil partnership in June 2023.

== Styles ==
- The Reverend Andrew Nunn (1983–1999)
- The Reverend Canon Andrew Nunn (1999–2012)
- The Very Reverend Andrew Nunn (2012)

Church of England titles
| Preceded by Colin Slee | Dean of Southwark; 2012–2023 | Mark Oakley |
