= Derek Bond (bishop) =

British Anglican bishop

The Rt Revd Derek Bond AKC
- Bishop of Bradwell
- Diocese: Diocese of Chelmsford
- In office: 1976–1992; Area bishop: 1983–1992
- Predecessor: John Gibbs
- Successor: Laurie Green
- Other posts: Honorary assistant bishop in Chelmsford (2006–present); in Gloucester and in Worcester (1992–2006); Archdeacon of Colchester (1972–1976)

Orders
- Ordination: 1952 (deacon); 1953 (priest)
- Consecration: 1976

Personal details
- Born: 4 July 1927
- Died: 20 July 2018 (aged 91)
- Denomination: Anglican
- Parents: Charles & Doris
- Spouse: Joan Meikle
- Children: 2 sons; 2 daughters
- Education: King's College London

Charles Derek Bond (4 July 1927 – 20 July 2018) was a British Anglican bishop, the Bishop of Bradwell, from 1976 until 1993, during which time the diocese's area scheme was founded in 1983.

== Biography ==
Bond was educated at Bournemouth School and King's College London before embarking on an ecclesiastical career with a curacy at St Peter-le-Poer, Friern Barnet. After incumbencies at Harringay and Harrow Weald he was appointed Archdeacon of Colchester before being elevated to the episcopate.

In retirement he continued to serve the Church as an assistant bishop – first within the Diocese of Worcester and then in the Diocese of Chelmsford. He died on 20 July 2018 at the age of 91.

Church of England titles
Preceded by John Gibbs	Bishop of Bradwell; 1976–1992	Succeeded by Laurie Green
