= Elizabeth Snowden =

British Anglican priest (born 1958)

The Reverend Elizabeth Snowden
- Archdeacon of Chelmsford
- Church: Church of England
- Diocese: Diocese of Chelmsford
- In office: 2016 to 2022
- Predecessor: David Lowman

Orders
- Ordination: 2001 (deacon); 2002 (priest)

Personal details
- Born: Elizabeth Hall; 1958 (age 67–68)
- Denomination: Anglicanism
- Spouse: Geoff Snowden
- Children: Four
- Education: Plymouth Polytechnic; London Institute of Education; Queen's College, Birmingham; University of Birmingham

Elizabeth Snowden (née Hall; born 1958) is a British retired Anglican priest and former school teacher. From March 2016 until her October 2022 retirement, she was Archdeacon of Chelmsford in the Diocese of Chelmsford.

== Early life and education ==
Snowden was born Elizabeth Hall in 1958. She studied geography at Plymouth Polytechnic, graduating with a Bachelor of Science (BSc) degree in 1979. She then trained as a teacher at the London Institute of Education and completed a Postgraduate Certificate in Education (PGCE) in 1980. She then taught geography and economics at a secondary school.

In 1998, Snowden entered Queen's College, Birmingham, an ecumenical theological college in Birmingham, to train for ordination. During this time she also studied theology at the University of Birmingham, graduating with a Bachelor of Arts (BA) degree in 2001.

== Ordained ministry ==
Snowden was ordained in the Church of England as a deacon in 2001 and as a priest in 2002. From 2001 to 2004, she served her curacy at Christ Church, Burntwood in the Diocese of Lichfield. In May 2004, she was appointed Resident Minister of Clayhanger Holy Trinity, a church plant that worships in a building of Holy Trinity School in Clayhanger, West Midlands, and also became Youth Work Coordinator for the Parish of St James, Brownhills.

In 2010, Snowden was appointed priest-in-charge of the Benefice of Bestwood Emmanuel with St Mark in the Diocese of Southwell and Nottingham. The following year, in 2011, she was made Vicar of the benefice. From 2013, she was also Area Dean of Nottingham North. During this time she worked closely four other parishes the Bestwood area including two Methodist-Anglican local ecumenical partnerships.

In December 2015, Snowden was announced as the next Archdeacon of Chelmsford in the Diocese of Chelmsford. On 13 March 2016, she was collated and installed as Archdeacon during a service at Chelmsford Cathedral. The Archdeaconry of Chelmsford covers the Deaneries of Brentwood, Chelmsford North, Chelmsford South, and Maldon and Dengie.

Snowden announced her retirement, on or after a "farewell service" scheduled for 2 October 2022.

== Personal life ==
Snowden is married to Geoff and she has four children.
