= Adam Atkinson =

British Anglican priest

The Right Reverend Adam Atkinson
- Bishop of Bradwell
- Diocese: Diocese of Chelmsford
- In office: September 2023 to present
- Predecessor: John Perumbalath
- Other posts: Archdeacon of Charing Cross (2020–2023); Mission Director, Two Cities area (2019–2020)

Orders
- Ordination: 2007 (deacon); 2008 (priest)
- Consecration: 29 September 2023 by Justin Welby

Personal details
- Born: 1967 (age 58–59)
- Denomination: Anglicanism
- Spouse: Heather
- Children: 3
- Education: University of Birmingham; Wycliffe Hall, Oxford

Adam Atkinson (born 1967) is a British Anglican bishop. Since September 2023, he has been Bishop of Bradwell in the Church of England's Diocese of Chelmsford. From 2020 to 2023, he was Archdeacon of Charing Cross in the Diocese of London.

== Biography ==
Atkinson was born in 1967 and studied at the University of Birmingham, graduating with a Bachelor of Arts (BA) degree in 1989. He trained for ordained ministry at Wycliffe Hall, Oxford, an evangelical Anglican theological college, from 2005 to 2007.

Atkinson was ordained in the Church of England as a deacon in 2007 and as a priest in 2008. After a curacy in Shadwell, he was Vicar of Bethnal Green for 9 years. He was Mission Director for the Two Cities area from 2019 until his appointment as an archdeacon. In March 2020, he was appointed Archdeacon of Charing Cross.

On 19 June 2023, it was announced that Atkinson would be the next Bishop of Bradwell, a suffragan bishop in the Diocese of Chelmsford. On 29 September 2023, he was consecrated as a bishop by Justin Welby, Archbishop of Canterbury, during a service at Westminster Abbey, before taking up his new role in November 2023.
