= Chris Burke (priest) =

Church of England priest

The Venerable Chris Burke
- Archdeacon of Barking
- Church: Church of England
- Diocese: Diocese of Chelmsford
- In office: 2019 to present
- Predecessor: John Perumbalath
- Other posts: Canon Residentiary of Sheffield (2010–2019): Vice-Dean (2014–2019) & Precentor (2013–2019)

Orders
- Ordination: 1992 (deacon); 1993 (priest) by John Habgood (deacon); Gordon Bates (priest)

Personal details
- Born: 1965 (age 60–61)
- Denomination: Anglican
- Spouse: Helen
- Children: 2
- Education: Coventry Polytechnic

Christopher Mark Burke (born 1965) is a Church of England priest; he is the Archdeacon of Barking.

== Education and family ==
Burke graduated from Coventry Polytechnic with a Bachelor of Laws (LLB) in 1987 and began training for the ministry at Ripon College Cuddesdon in 1989. He later gained a Master of Arts (MA) from Heythrop College, London in 2006. He married Helen, a general practitioner, and they have two children.

== Ministry ==
Burke was made deacon at Petertide 1992 (5 July) by John Habgood, Archbishop of York, at York Minster and ordained a priest the Petertide following (5 July 1993) by Gordon Bates, Bishop of Whitby, at St Mary's Church, Nunthorpe (his title). He served his curacy in Nunthorpe (1992–1996) before becoming Vicar of South Bank, York until 2002 and then Rector of St Dunstan's, Stepney (East London).

On 12 September 2010, he was installed a Canon Residentiary of Sheffield Cathedral and served as "Canon for Learning and Development" until 2013, when, remaining a Canon Residentiary, he took the role of Precentor; he additionally become Vice-Dean in 2014. He became Archdeacon of Barking in the Diocese of Chelmsford in May 2019.

Church of England titles
Preceded by John Perumbalath	Archdeacon of Barking; 2019 onwards	designate
