= Mike Lodge =

British Anglican priest

Michael John Lodge (born 1 August 1953) is a retired British Anglican priest who served as Archdeacon of Southend in the Diocese of Chelmsford, 2017– 2021.

Lodge trained for ordained ministry at Wycliffe Hall Oxford. He was ordained deacon in 1989 and priest in 1990. After a curacy at Highworth he was priest in charge at St Luke's, Cheltenham. He was then team rector at Rayleigh from 2005 until his appointment as archdeacon. Lodge retired during November 2021.
