= David Lowman (priest) =

The Venerable David Lowman
- Archdeacon of Chelmsford
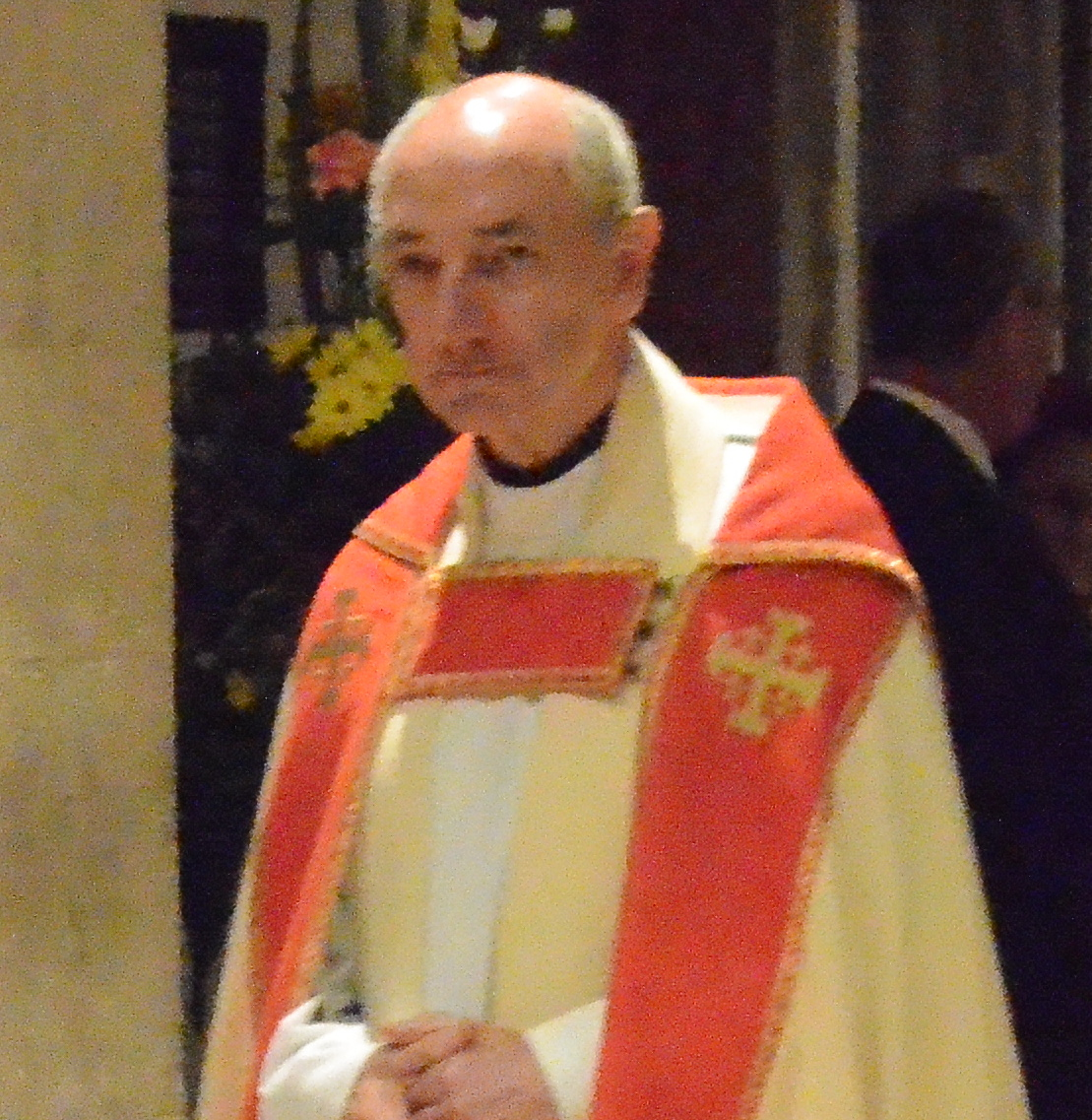
- Lowman in 2013
- Church: Church of England
- Diocese: Diocese of Chelmsford
- In office: 1 February 2013–31 January 2016
- Predecessor: Himself (as Archdeacon of Southend)
- Successor: Elizabeth Snowden
- Other post: Archdeacon of Southend (2001–2013)

Orders
- Ordination: 1976

Personal details
- Born: David Walter Lowman; 27 November 1948 (age 77)

David Walter Lowman (born 27 November 1948) is a British Church of England priest. From 2013 to 2016, he was the Archdeacon of Chelmsford. He was Archdeacon of Southend from 2001 to 2013; the archdeaconry was renamed in February 2013 and he continued to serve it under is new name.

== Early life ==
Lowman was born on 27 November 1948. He was educated at Crewkerne School and the City of London College.

== Ordained ministry ==
Lowman was ordained in 1976. After curacies in Notting Hill and Kilburn he was vocations adviser at Church House, Westminster, from 1981 to 1986. He was team rector at Wickford and Runwell from 1986 to 1993. He was then Diocesan Director of Ordinands and a non-residentiary canon of Chelmsford Cathedral from 1993 to 2013.

Lowman was Archdeacon of Southend from 2001 to 2013. On 1 February 2013, the archdeaconry was renamed and he continued to serve it as Archdeacon of Chelmsford. He retired from full-time ministry on 31 January 2016.
