= Archdeacons in the Diocese of Chelmsford =

Ecclesiastical officers of the Church of England

The Archdeacons in the Diocese of Chelmsford are senior ecclesiastical officers in the Church of England in Essex and East London. They currently include: the Archdeacon of West Ham, the Archdeacon of Colchester and the archdeacons of Chelmsford, of Barking, of Stansted and of Southend. Each one has responsibility over a geographical area within the diocese.

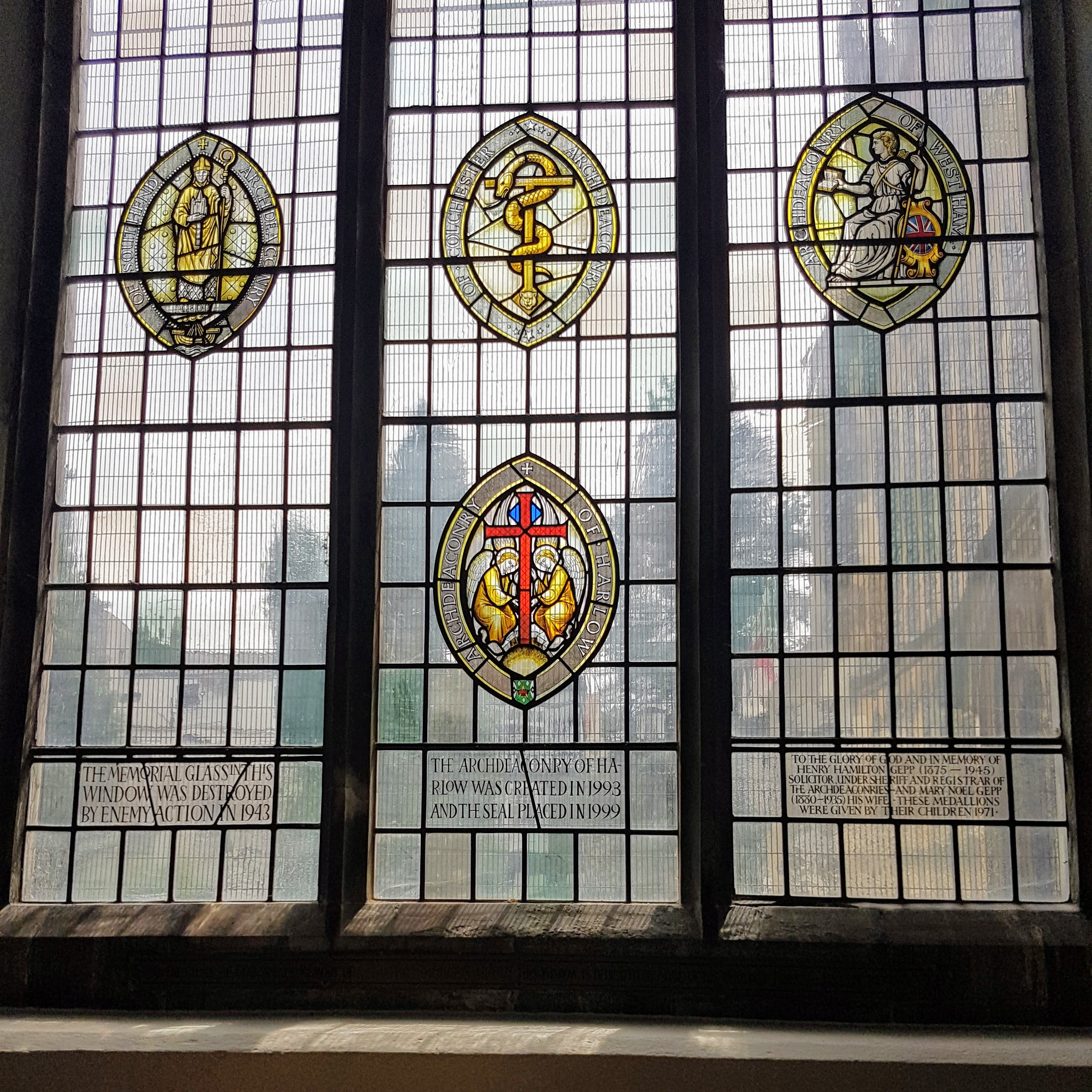
A window on the south side of Chelmsford Cathedral, showing the seals of the four pre-2013 archdeaconries.

== History ==
When the diocese was created, it consisted of the ancient archdeaconries of Essex and Colchester. The first changes to the diocese's archdeaconries occurred on 17 March 1922 when the Archdeaconry of Southend was created from the old Essex archdeaconry and that old archdeaconry renamed to West Ham: at its erection, the 1922 Southend archdeaconry consisted of the Deaneries of Barstable/Brentwood, of Canewdon and Southend, of Chelmsford, of Chigwell, of Dengie, of Harlow, of Maldon, of Ongar, of Roding, and of Wickford. West Ham archdeaconry was further split in 1993 to create the Archdeaconry of Harlow following a 1989 decision of the Diocesan Synod.

As part of Stephen Cottrell's vision for the diocese's long-term future, consultations occurred on proposals to create three new archdeaconries. On 1 February 2013, by Pastoral Order of the Bishop of Chelmsford, the three archdeaconries were created: the new Archdeaconry of Stansted from Colchester archdeaconry, a new Archdeaconry of Barking from West Ham archdeaconry and a new Archdeaconry of Southend created from Southend archdeaconry after it had been renamed the Archdeaconry of Chelmsford. Initially, the Archdeacons of Colchester, of West Ham, and of Chelmsford were also Acting Archdeacons of Stansted, of Barking, and of Southend respectively.

In April 2024, it was announced that Guli Francis-Dehqani, Bishop of Chelmsford, would dissolve the vacant Harlow archdeaconry, dividing its territory: Harlow deanery joining Stansted archdeaconry and the Deanery of Epping Forest and Ongar joining Chelmsford archdeaconry. The Bishop's Pastoral Order effecting the changes was sealed on 15 April 2024 and took effect immediately.

== List of archdeacons ==
=== Archdeacons of Essex and of West Ham ===
- 2007–present: Elwin Cockett

=== Archdeacons of Colchester ===
- 2010–present: Ruth Patten

=== Archdeacons of Southend (before 2013) and of Chelmsford ===
Archdeacons of Southend

- 1922–1937 (ret.): Percy Bayne (afterwards archdeacon emeritus)
- 1938–1953 (ret.): Ellis Gowing (afterwards archdeacon emeritus)
- 1953–1972 (ret.): Neville Welch (also Bishop suffragan of Bradwell from 1968)
- 1972–1977 (res.): Peter Bridges
- 1977–1982 (res.): John Moses
- 1982–1992 (res.): Jonathan Bailey
- 1992–2000 (res.): David Jennings
- 2001 – 1 February 2013 (renamed): David Lowman

Archdeacons of Chelmsford

- 1 February 2013 – 31 January 2016 (ret.): David Lowman
- 13 March 2016 – October 2022 (ret): Elizabeth Snowden (retired on or after 2 October 2022)
- 4 November 2023 – present: Jonathan Croucher

=== Archdeacons of Harlow ===
- 1993–1996 (res.): Michael Fox
- 1996–2009 (ret.): Peter Taylor
- 2009 – 31 March 2017 (ret.): Martin Webster
- 24 September 2017 – 31 March 2023 (retired): Vanessa Herrick

The Archdeaconry of Harlow was dissolved on 15 April 2024.

=== Archdeacons of Barking ===
- 1 February – 15 September 2013: Elwin Cockett, Archdeacon of West Ham (Acting)
- 15 September 2013 – 3 July 2018: John Perumbalath (became area Bishop of Bradwell)
- 12 May 2019 – present: Chris Burke

=== Archdeacons of Stansted ===
- 1 February – 15 September 2013: Annette Cooper, Archdeacon of Colchester (Acting)
- 15 September 2013 – 30 September 2023: Robin King
- 4 November 2023 – present: Kate Peacock

=== Archdeacons of Southend (since 2013) ===
- 1 February – 15 September 2013: David Lowman, Archdeacon of Chelmsford (Acting)
- 15 September 2013 – 31 December 2016 (ret.): Mina Smallman
- 19 March 2017 – November 2021 (ret.): Mike Lodge (Acting since 1 August 2016)
- 26 June 2022 – 5 October 2024: Mike Power (Acting since November 2021; collated Archdeacon of West Ham, 5 October 2024)
- 16 February 2025 – present: Sue Lucas
