= John Haldane =

John Haldane may refer to:

- John Haldane (MP) (1660–1721), MP for Scotland in the 1st Parliament of Great Britain
- John Scott Haldane (1860–1936), British physiologist
- John Haldane (priest) (1881–1938), Provost of Southwark
- John Burdon Sanderson Haldane (1892–1964), British biologist
- John Haldane (philosopher) (born 1954), British philosopher
