= Peter Taylor (priest) =

English priest

Peter Flint Taylor (born 7 March 1944) was Archdeacon of Harlow in the Diocese of Chelmsford, serving from 1996 until 2009.

Taylor was educated at Clifton College and Queens' College, Cambridge; and the London College of Divinity. He was ordained deacon in 1970 and priest in 1971. After curacies at St Augustine's Highbury and St Andrew's, Plymouth he was vicar of Christ Church, Ironville, from 1977 to 1983. He was rector of Holy Trinity, Rayleigh, from Chelmsford from 1983 to 1996; chaplain of HM Prison Bullwood Hall from 1986 to 1990; and Rural Dean of Rochford from 1989 to 1996.
