= Joseph Jefferson (disambiguation) =

Joseph Jefferson (1829–1905) was an American stage actor.

Joseph Jefferson may also refer to:

- Joseph Jefferson (American football) (born 1980), American football cornerback
- Joseph H. Jefferson (born 1947), American politician
- Joseph Jefferson (priest) (died 1821), Archdeacon of Colchester
- Joseph John Jefferson (1795–1882), British Congregationalist minister and advocate for Christian pacifism
