= Bishop of Bradwell =

Anglican episcopal title

The Bishop of Bradwell is an episcopal title used by an area bishop of the Church of England Diocese of Chelmsford, in the Province of Canterbury, England. The title takes its name after the town of Bradwell-on-Sea in Essex; the See was erected by Order in Council dated 20 December 1967.

The bishops of Bradwell have been Area Bishops since the Chelmsford area scheme was erected in 1983. The Bishop of Bradwell has in his episcopal area 182 churches in 140 parishes. The Bishop of Bradwell's Area – the Bradwell Episcopal Area - comprises nine Deaneries in two Archdeaconries - Chelmsford and Southend. The Archdeaconry of Chelmsford comprises the Deaneries of Brentwood, Chelmsford North, Chelmsford South, and Maldon & Dengie. The Archdeaconry of Southend comprises the Deaneries of Thurrock, Basildon, Hadleigh, Rochford, and Southend-on-Sea.

The Bishop of Bradwell has his house and office base in Horndon-on-the-Hill.

== List of the bishops ==
Bishops of Bradwell
From	Until	Incumbent	Notes
1968	1973	Neville Welch	
1973	1976	John Gibbs	Translated to Coventry
1976	1993	Derek Bond	First area bishop from 1983.
1993	2011	Laurie Green	
2012	2017	John Wraw	Previously Archdeacon of Wilts; died in post, 25 July 2017.
2018	2023	John Perumbalath	Previously Archdeacon of Barking; Announced 9 March 2018; consecrated 3 July; translated to Liverpool, 20 January 2023.
2023	present	Adam Atkinson	
