= William Wells (priest) =

English archdeacon (died 1675)

William Wells (died August 1675) was an English clergyman and academic, who served as President of Queens' College, Cambridge and Archdeacon of Colchester.

Wells matriculated at Queens' College, Cambridge at Michaelmas 1629, graduating B.A. 1634, M.A. 1637, D.D. (per lit. reg.) 1668.

He was a Fellow of Queens' College from 1638 until 1644, when he was ejected. After the Restoration he became Rector of Sandon, Essex (1660–1675) and Little Shelford, Cambridgeshire (1668). He was appointed Archdeacon of Colchester in February 1667, serving until his death in August 1675.

He was elected President of Queens' College in 1667, and served as Vice-Chancellor of the University of Cambridge 1672–1673.
