= Aubrey Cleall =

English archdeacon

The Ven. Aubrey Victor George Cleall (9 December 1898 – 6 May 1982) was an English Anglican clergyman who was Archdeacon of Colchester from 1959 to 1969.

CLeall was born in Chandler's Ford, Hampshire, to music teacher George Cleall and Cecelia Cawdell. He was educated at Selwyn College, Cambridge, and ordained in 1925. After a curacy in his home town he was Vicar of Waltham Abbey from 1929 until his appointment as archdeacon.

He died in Eastbourne, Sussex, aged 83. There is a memorial to him in South Perrott parish church.

Church of England titles
Preceded by Frederick Dudley Vaughan Narborough	Archdeacon of Colchester; 1959–1969	Succeeded by Roderic Norman Coote
