= Robin King (priest) =

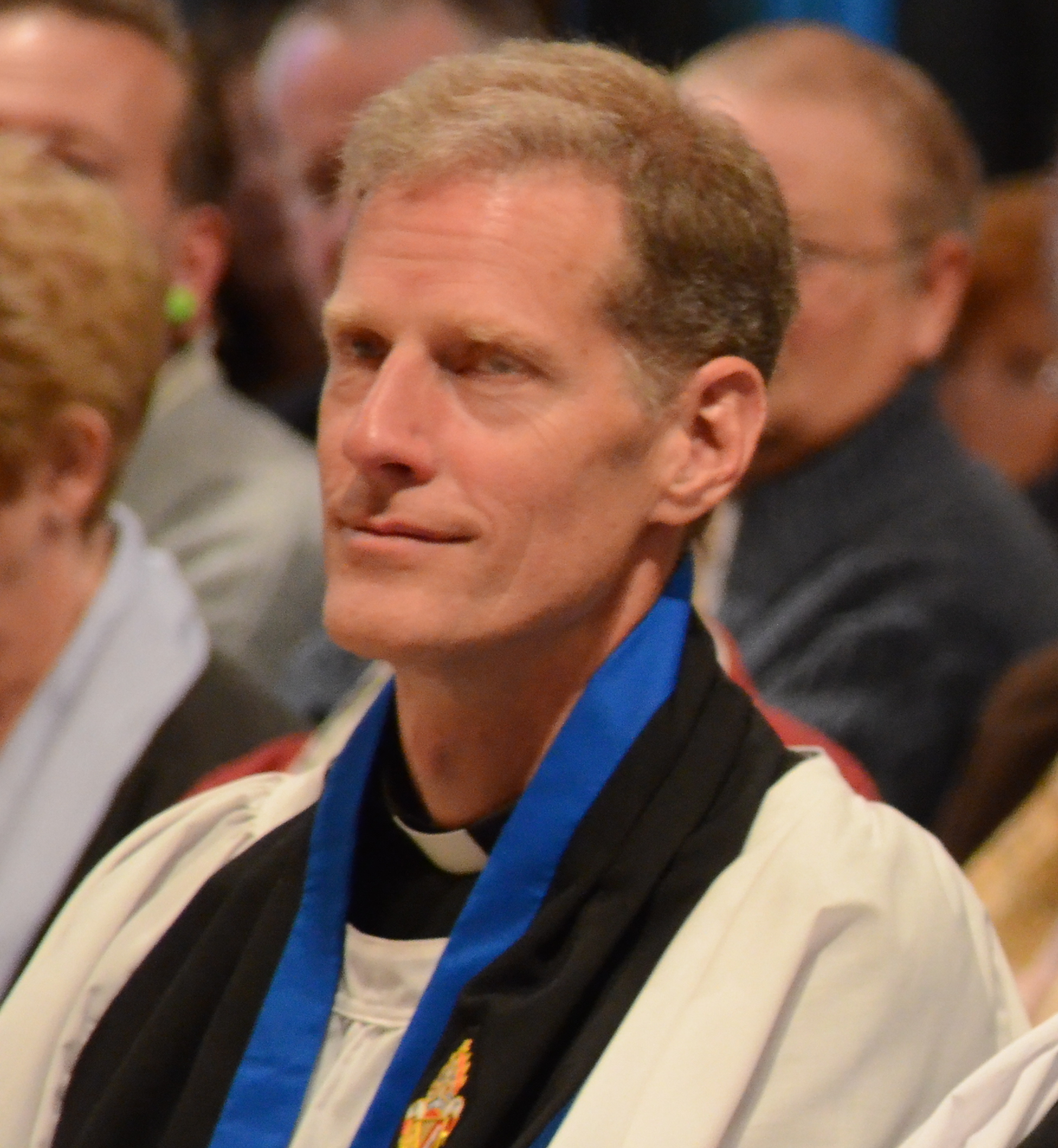
King in 2013

Robin Lucas Colin King (born 15 February 1959) is a retired Anglican priest who served as Archdeacon of Stansted in the Diocese of Chelmsford, 2013–2023.

Born in Quebec, Canada, King was educated at The King's School, Canterbury, Dundee University and Ridley Hall, Cambridge. He was ordained deacon in 1989 and priest in 1990. After a curacy at St Augustine, Ipswich he was Vicar of St Mary, Bures then Rural Dean of Sudbury before his appointment. He was an Honorary Canon of Chelmsford Cathedral from 2008 until 2013. He retired effective 30 September 2023.
