= John Standish =

English Anglican priest

John Standish was an English Anglican priest in the 16th century.

Standish was educated at Corpus Christi College, Oxford. He held the living at St Peter, Rodmarton; St Giles, Medbourne; St Peter, Paglesham and St Andrew Undershaft in the City of London. He was a Canon of St Paul's Cathedral and Archdeacon of Colchester from 1553 until 1554.
