= Mark Oakley =

British Anglican priest (born 1968)

The Very Reverend Mark Oakley FSA
- Dean of Southwark
- Church: Church of England
- Diocese: Southwark
- In office: 2023–present
- Previous posts: Dean of St John's College, Cambridge (2018–2023); Canon Chancellor of St Paul's (2013–2018); Canon Treasurer of St Paul's (2010–2013); Archdeacon of Germany and Northern Europe (2005–2008)

Orders
- Ordination: 1993 (deacon); 1994 (priest) by David Hope

Personal details
- Born: Mark David Oakley; 28 September 1968 (age 57) Shrewsbury, England
- Denomination: Anglicanism
- Occupation: Priest
- Education: King's College London; Bangor University

Mark David Oakley (born 28 September 1968) is a British Church of England priest. He is Dean of Southwark and formerly Dean of St John's College, Cambridge.

== Early life ==
Oakley was born on 28 September 1968 in Shrewsbury and was educated at Shrewsbury School, where he was awarded a Rank Foundation Leadership Award, and King's College London, before going to St Stephen's House, Oxford, where he studied for ordination in the Church of England.

== Ordained ministry ==
Oakley was made deacon at Petertide 1993 (27 June) at St Paul's Cathedral; and ordained priest the next Petertide (2 July 1994) at St John's Wood Church — both times by David Hope, Bishop of London. He served as assistant curate of St John's Wood Church from 1993 to 1996. He was then asked by Richard Chartres, Bishop of London, to serve as his chaplain, which he did from 1996 to 2000. He was made a Deputy Priest in Ordinary to Elizabeth II in 1996. In 2000, he became Rector of St Paul's, Covent Garden (also known as the Actors' Church).

In 2005, the Bishop of Gibraltar in Europe, Geoffrey Rowell, appointed Oakley as Archdeacon of Germany and Northern Europe and chaplain of St Alban's Church in Copenhagen. The archdeaconry comprises eight countries (Iceland, Denmark, Sweden, Finland, Norway, Latvia, Estonia and Germany) in which there are many Church of England chaplaincies serving the international Anglican community.

In 2008, he was appointed priest-in-charge of Grosvenor Chapel, Mayfair, London, by the Bishop of London. He was also appointed an examining chaplain and bishops' advisor. In June 2010, he was appointed to St Paul's Cathedral, London, as a residentiary canon, initially as Canon Treasurer. In 2013, he became Canon Chancellor; in that role he was responsible for educational work and engagement with the arts.

Oakley resigned from St Paul's Cathedral to become Dean of St John's College, Cambridge, from Michaelmas 2018. He was a Fellow and Tutor of the college. He was instituted Dean of Southwark (first among equals of the clergy at Southwark Cathedral and senior priest of the Diocese of Southwark) on 3 December 2023.

In 2020, he was installed as Canon Theologian (honorary) of Wakefield Cathedral.

In 2021, Oakley was given a Fellowship by King's College London (FKC) in recognition of his 'exceptional service and achievement'.

In 2021, he was admitted to the degree of Master of Arts by the University of Cambridge, and in 2022 was awarded the degree of Doctor of Philosophy (PhD) by Bangor University in English Literature. His supervisors were Professor Helen Wilcox, Professor Tony Brown, and Professor Andrew Hiscock.

In 2023, the Archbishop of Canterbury awarded Oakley the Lanfranc Award for Education and Scholarship, for 'ceaselessly and with enormous energy and skill, helping to build bridges between the Church and poets'. The citation concluded, 'Mark Oakley's contribution to education, both formal and informal, has been and continues to be outstanding'. Also in 2023, the University of Chester conferred the honorary degree of Doctor of Education on Oakley for his 'outstanding contribution to education and the arts'. In 2025 he was elected Fellow of the Society of Antiquaries.

== Writing ==
In 2001, Oakley wrote a popular book called The Collage of God, which received a number of positive reviews. The book was reissued by Canterbury Press in 2012. He has also edited a book of John Donne's poetry and compiled a wedding anthology. In 2015, he published an anthology of readings for funerals for SPCK. He edited A Good Year with contributions by bishops on the liturgical year (SPCK 2016). He has contributed several essays to various books and reviews in theological papers and journals. He also regularly broadcasts.

Oakley wrote the introduction for the reissue of Jeffrey John's book Permanent, Faithful, Stable, arguing: "It is essential that the Church embraces its gay and lesbian members fully as part of God's diversity and celebrates their permanent, faithful and stable relationships with prayer, affirmation and words of blessing." Oakley spoke at the Greenbelt Festival in 2013 on the same theme. He preached in 2017 at St-Martin-in-the-Fields in commemoration of the 50th anniversary of decriminalisation of homosexuality in England and Wales:

Oakley is known for his interest in the ways literature and poetry explore theological themes and for his preaching, which is often both entertaining and noticeably rooted in his Anglicanism. While he was at the Actors' Church he was widely appreciated by the theatre community for his understanding and appreciation of its work. His initiative of having a series of sermons which explored plays that were currently showing in London, to which the actors and production team of each play came and took part in conversation, is an example of the way Oakley tries to open a dialogue between people of faith and the work of the artistic community. A lecture given by him at Westminster Abbey and Keble College, Oxford, in 2002 argued that the church in its search to be relevant was ironically becoming too secular for the British public and that it should be the deeper human resonances that the church seeks to identify, explore and dialogue with. The Archbishop of Canterbury, Rowan Williams, wrote in 2004 that Oakley's thinking and approach is in the tradition of Westcott. A later article (2008) by Oakley in the Church Times, entitled "An Issue! An Issue! We all Fall Down", argues for the renewal of theological generosity in the Anglican spirit. In 2010, the former Poet Laureate, Sir Andrew Motion, wrote a poem dedicated to Oakley entitled "In Winter" and said of him: "It's extremely unusual to meet anyone who isn't a specialist who has such a subtle feeling for language as he does." Motion has since added that he believes Oakley to be "the best sermoniser I've ever heard. And he's funny, and he knows a lot, and he's lived."

In August 2016, Oakley published The Splash of Words: Believing in Poetry (Canterbury Press), about which the Poet Laureate, Dame Carol Ann Duffy wrote that "this beautiful and wise meditation centred around the soul language of poetry opens new windows in the shared house of both poetry and belief". Rowan Williams has commented: "Some writers have the gift of simply letting you know you can trust them. Mark Oakley has this gift in abundance: in this book we read in his company a succession of very diverse poems; we listen to his honest, careful, demanding reflections on them; and we recognise that this is a deeply authentic voice that can be relied on not to give us either clichés or indulgent ramblings. A very moving book, opening all kinds of doors into a more compassionate, more truthful understanding." The poet Imtiaz Dharker has said of the book: "Even believing in poetry, he still leaves space for unease and uncertainties, because he of all people recognises that 'there is no/ Road that is right entirely'. In doing so he illuminates the way for those who think they know the territory as well as for those who may be wary of it. Dipping in to this book, the spirit is cleansed in the sparkle of language." The book won the Michael Ramsey Prize for global theological writing in 2019, awarded every three years, and was presented to Oakley by the Archbishop of Canterbury at the Greenbelt Festival.

In 2018, Dame Carol Ann Duffy asked Oakley to be a judge of the 2018 Ted Hughes Award for new work in poetry.

In 2019, Oakley published a collection of sermons, By Way of the Heart (Canterbury Press). Rowan Williams commented in a review: "Mark Oakley is one of the most distinctive, intelligent and refreshing voices in the Church of England, always illuminating, never stale or second-hand".

Oakley also published in 2019 a collection of reflections on the poetry of George Herbert, My Sour-Sweet Days: George Herbert and the Journey of the Soul (SPCK). Professor Helen Wilcox, editor of The English Poems of George Herbert, said that each of the forty well-chosen poems are "followed by a short but profound reflection...the combination is excellent: richly expressive poems and accessible personal meditations. This book powerfully demonstrates how poetry can bring comfort, refreshment and renewed energy to our spiritual lives".

== Other interests ==
Oakley was Chair of the Civil Liberties Trust and a Director of Liberty (Liberty), and is currently Patron of Tell MAMA and an ambassador for Stop Hate UK. He received one of the first National Hate Crime Awards in 2016. He is a visiting lecturer in the Theology and Religious Studies Department at King's College London and was appointed a visiting scholar of Sarum College in 2017. He was also President of the Shropshire Horticultural Society, when it organised the Shrewsbury Flower Show for 2014.

In April 2025, he was elected a Fellow of the Society of Antiquaries of London (FSA).

== Personal life ==
Oakley is in a civil partnership with Nicholas Laws.
