= Michael Fox (priest) =

Church of England priest

Michael John Fox (born 28 April 1942) is a retired Church of England priest and was an Archdeacon in the Diocese of Chelmsford, serving from 1993 until 2007.

Fox was educated at Barking Abbey Grammar School; Hull University; and the College of the Resurrection, Mirfield. He was ordained deacon in 1966, and priest in 1967. After Curacies at St Elizabeth, Becontree and Holy Trinity, South Woodford he was Vicar of the Church of the Ascension, Victoria Dock and Missioner at Felsted School from 1972 to 1976. He was the incumbent at All Saints, Chelmsford from 1976 to 1988; Rural Dean of Chelmsford from 1982 to 1988; Rector of St James, Colchester from 1988 to 1993; an Honorary Canon of Chelmsford Cathedral from 1991; Archdeacon of Harlow from 1993 to 1996; and Archdeacon of West Ham from 1996 to 2007.
