= Vanessa Herrick =

Anglican priest

Vanessa Anne Herrick (born 27 March 1958) is a retired Anglican priest who served as the Archdeacon of Harlow.

She was educated at the University of York; St John's College, Nottingham; Fitzwilliam College, Cambridge; and Ridley Hall, Cambridge. Herrick was ordained deacon in 1996, and priest in 1997. After a curacy in Bury St Edmunds she was a tutor at Ridley then Director of Mission and Vocation for the Diocese of Ely from 2003 until 2012. She was then Rector of Wimborne Minster from 2012 to 2015; and of the Northern Villages (Hinton Martell, Holt, Horton, Chalbury, Witchampton, Stanbridge, Long Crichel and More Crichel) until her appointment as Archdeacon of Harlow. She retired effective 31 March 2023.
