= St John the Baptist Church, Buckhurst Hill =

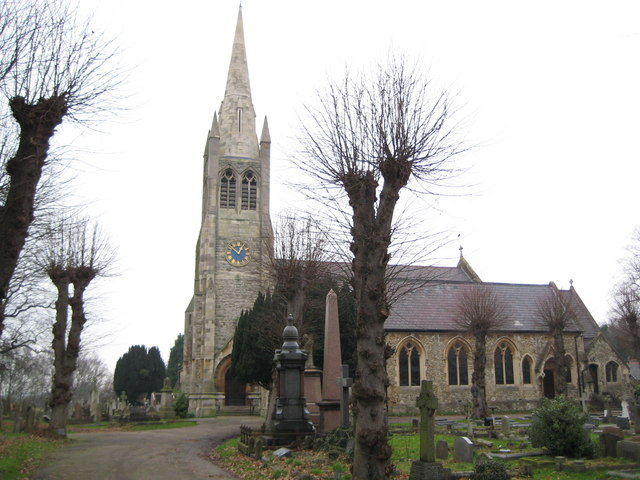
- St John the Baptist, Buckhurst Hill
- St John the Baptist Church, Buckhurst Hill
- 51°37′44.9″N 0°1′59.6″E
- Denomination: Church of England
- Website: St John the Baptist Church

History
- Founded: 1837
- Dedication: Saint John

Architecture
- Functional status: Parish church
- Heritage designation: Grade II
- Designated: 29 May 1984
- Architectural type: Church

Administration
- Province: Canterbury
- Diocese: Chelmsford
- Archdeaconry: Harlow
- Deanery: Epping Forest and Ongar
- Parish: Buckhurst Hill

Clergy
- Vicar: Rev'd Dr Ian Farley

St John the Baptist Church, or St John's, is a Church of England parish church in the town of Buckhurst Hill in Essex, England.

== History ==
The church was built in 1837 as a chapel of ease. The following year Buckhurst Hill was constituted a separate ecclesiastical district. At this time the area was part of the ancient parish of Chigwell. Buckhurst Hill did not become a separate parish until 1867. In June 2017 the church celebrated its 180th anniversary.
