= Dudley Narborough =

English Anglican bishop (1895–1966)

Frederick Dudley Vaughan Narborough (called Dudley; 13 June 1895 – 21 January 1966) was an eminent Anglican bishop in the mid-twentieth century.

Educated at Norwich School and Worcester College, Oxford; he was deaconed at Michaelmastide 1921 (18 September) and priested the next Michaelmas (24 September 1922) — both times by Hubert Burge, Bishop of Oxford, at Christ Church Cathedral, Oxford, and began his ecclesiastical career as Chaplain at his old college. After this he was Resident Chaplain to Randall Davidson, Archbishop of Canterbury; a Canon Residentiary at Bristol Cathedral; and then Provost of Southwark Cathedral before a 20-year spell as Bishop of Colchester. Until 1959, he was also Archdeacon of Colchester, after then he was also an honorary canon of Chelmsford Cathedral. He was consecrated a bishop on All Saints' Day 1946 (1 November) at Westminster Abbey;

Church of England titles
Preceded by John Haldane	Provost of Southwark; 1939–1941	Succeeded by Cuthbert Bardsley
Preceded by Charles Ridsdale	Bishop of Colchester; 1946–1966	Succeeded by Roderic Coote
Preceded by Charles Ridsdale	Archdeacon of Colchester; 1946–1959	Succeeded by Aubrey Cleall
