= Laurie Green =

British Anglican bishop (born 1945)

The Right Reverend Laurie Green
- Bishop of Bradwell
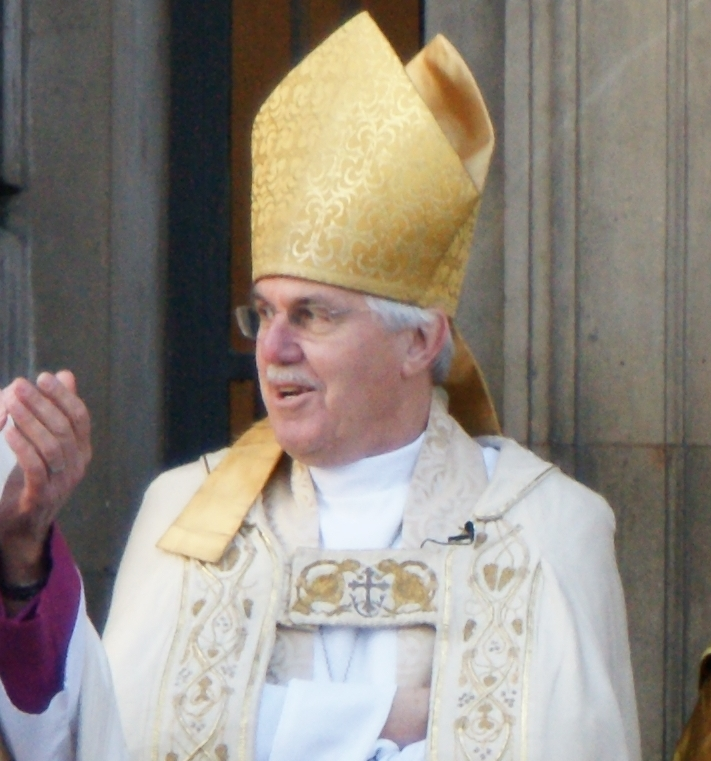
- Bishop Green in 2010
- Church: Church of England
- Diocese: Diocese of Chelmsford
- In office: 1993 – 28 February 2011
- Predecessor: Derek Bond
- Successor: John Wraw

Orders
- Ordination: 24 May 1970
- Consecration: 23 February 1993

Personal details
- Born: 26 December 1945 (age 80) East End of London
- Denomination: Anglican
- Spouse: Victoria (m. 1969)
- Children: 2 daughters
- Education: King's College London

Laurence Alexander "Laurie" Green (born 26 December 1945) is a retired British Anglican bishop. He was the Bishop of Bradwell from 1993 to 2011.

== Early career and ministry ==
Laurie Green was born in London Borough of Newham, the son of a bus driver and factory worker. As a young man he worked in a jellied-eel factory and then as a hairdresser. He was educated at East Ham Grammar School and King's College London (BD, AKC) and then at the New York Theological Seminary (STM, DMin). There he studied the dynamics of East Harlem gangs and attained his master's degree in psychology and pastoral studies. After further studies at St Augustine's College, Canterbury, he was ordained in 1970. He was a curate at St Mark's Kingstanding, Birmingham, after which he was vicar of St Chad, Erdington, where he set up an ecumenical parish at Spaghetti Junction with local Methodists.

During his time in Birmingham he initiated work in urban theology, worked with Hell's Angels and Skinheads and had his own BBC Radio programme, 'The Green Machine'. He also worked as Assistant Youth Officer for the diocese and as Industrial Chaplain to the British Steel Corporation (Bromford Tubes Division). At the same time he became an honorary lecturer at the Urban Theology Unit, Sheffield University; For seven years, he was the principal of the Aston Training Scheme for Anglican ordinands, before returning to East London to become, before his ordination to the episcopate, team rector of All Saints, Poplar. Poplar is situated in the London Docklands, where his parish had the new financial quarter of Canary Wharf being built at one end, in close proximity to the tower-blocks of abject poverty at the other.

== Episcopal ministry ==
In 1993, Green moved to Essex to become the Bishop of Bradwell, where he served for eighteen years before retiring to Bexhill in Sussex. He was consecrated a bishop on 23 February 1993, by George Carey, Archbishop of Canterbury, at Westminster Abbey.

Within the Diocese of Chelmsford, Green's Episcopal Area of Bradwell covered such towns as Basildon, Tilbury Docks, Southend, Maldon, Brentwood and Chelmsford as well as the deep rural areas of the Dengie peninsula where a stone chapel was built by St Cedd in 654 AD in Bradwell. Green then lived near to the River Thames, by the Dartford Tunnel & Bridge. He was a member of the Archbishop of Canterbury's Urban Theology Group, served on the Urban Bishops’ Panel of the Church of England and as chair of the Church of England's Urban Strategy Consultative Group. He was instrumental in the setting up of an International Anglican Commission and Network on Global Urbanisation.

On 11 February 2017, Green was one of fourteen retired bishops to sign an open letter to the then-serving bishops of the Church of England. In an unprecedented move, they expressed their opposition to the House of Bishops' report to General Synod on sexuality, which recommended no change to the Church's canons or practices around sexuality. By 13 February, a serving bishop (Alan Wilson, Bishop of Buckingham) and nine further retired bishops had added their signatures; on 15 February, the report was rejected by synod. Green has continued to campaign for full equality for practising homosexuals in the Church of England.

== Theology ==
Green has written extensively on the nature of theology, international debt and urban mission. His Let’s Do Theology (revised in 2009) was described by Leonardo Boff{ as an authentic liberation theology for the English-speaking world, and by Elaine Graham as "a classic text". Another two of his books, "Power to the Powerless" and "Urban Ministry and the Kingdom of God", were named by the Church Times among its "Books of the Year", whilst others have been translated into many languages. In 2015 he published Blessed are the Poor? Urban Poverty and the Church which seeks to demonstrate that the incarnation of Christ amongst the poor suggests that it is amongst the poor that we will learn the lessons of God's kingdom. In 2023, at the age of 77, he published his autobiography, "Jesus and Jellied Eels - making sense of my life".

== Family and retirement ==
A jazz devotee, blues and classical guitar player and lover of folk music, Green continues to give public concerts and produce CDs. He is married with two children.

Green remains founding-chair of the National Estate Churches Network (NECN) and in retirement, works alongside the Church Urban Fund as Chair and Development Officer for the NECN in the support of the church’s work on the poorer housing estates and projects of the UK. He also continues to work as a founding trustee of the charity Building Better Futures International. He is also the bishop visitor to the Anglican Benedictine community of religious sisters at Malling Abbey, Kent.

== Styles ==
- The Reverend Laurie Green (24 May 1970 – 1982)
- The Reverend Doctor Laurie Green (1982 – 23 February 1993)
- The Right Reverend Doctor Laurie Green (23 February 1993 – present)

Church of England titles
Preceded by Derek Bond	Bishop of Bradwell; 1993–2011	Succeeded by John Wraw
