= John Gibbs (bishop) =

John Gibbs (15 March 1917 – 20 December 2007) was an Anglican bishop. He was the Bishop of Coventry in the Church of England from 1976 until 1985. He was the first Church of England bishop in modern times to have started his ministry in the nonconformist tradition.

Born in Heywood, Lancashire in 1917, he left school to begin work before entering Western College, Bristol for training as a Congregational Minister. He was ordained in 1943, the year of his marriage, and served as minister of Sarisbury Green Congregational Church, Hampshire, and Garstang Road Congregational Church, Preston, Lancashire.

The turning point in his career came in 1949 when he joined the Student Christian Movement, working in Bristol. This meant he liaised with many churches and, becoming drawn to the Anglican tradition, he re-trained for the ministry at Lincoln Theological College; he was made a deacon on Trinity Sunday 1955 (5 June) at Bristol Cathedral and ordained a priest on 26 February 1956 at his title church — both times by Frederic Cockin, Bishop of Bristol; and took up a curacy at St Luke's Church, Brislington. His, however, was an educational vocation and in 1957 he became head of Divinity at St Matthias Teacher Training College, Bristol, rising to Vice-Principal in 1962. In 1964, Gibbs was appointed head of Keswick Hall College of Education in Norfolk. From 1967 he was a key member of the Durham Commission on the future of Religious Education in Schools. In 1968 he was appointed an honorary canon of Norwich Cathedral and in 1973 he was appointed suffragan Bishop of Bradwell in Essex. He was consecrated a bishop on 19 June 1973 at Westminster Abbey. Three years later he replaced the more flamboyant Cuthbert Bardsley as Bishop of Coventry, eventually serving for nine years.

One of his proudest achievements was founding Myton Hamlet Hospice and when he retired to Minchinhampton near Stroud, Gloucestershire he was a leading figure in helping to start the Cotswold Care Hospice. In July 2006, while visiting his daughter near Cambridge he became completely paralysed from mid chest downwards. He found a new home in the Hope Nursing Home in Cambridge where he died on 20 December 2007 aged 90.

== Styles ==
- The Reverend John Gibbs (1943–1968)
- The Reverend Canon John Gibbs (1968–1973)
- The Right Reverend John Gibbs (1973–2007)

Church of England titles
Preceded by Neville Welch	Bishop of Bradwell; 1973–1976	Succeeded by Derek Bond
Preceded by Cuthbert Bardsley	Bishop of Coventry; 1976–1985	Succeeded by Simon Barrington-Ward
