= Richard Curwen =

English Anglican priest

Richard Curwen, D.D. was an English Anglican priest in the 16th century.

Curwen was a Fellow of Corpus Christi College, Oxford. He held the living at St Michael, Crooked Lane in the City of London and was a Canon of Lincoln Cathedral. He was appointed Archdeacon of Oxford in 1535. and Archdeacon of Colchester in 1537, holding both positions until his death in 1543.
