= Martin Webster (priest) =

Anglican clergyman

Martin Duncan Webster (born 1952 in Hornchurch) has been Archdeacon of Harlow since 2009. On 22 December 2016, it was announced that he is to retire on 31 March 2017.

Webster was educated at the University of Nottingham and Lincoln Theological College; and ordained deacon in 1978, and priest, in 1979. He served curacies in Thundersley and Canvey Island. He was Vicar of All Saints, Nazeing from 1986 to 1999; Rural Dean of Harlow from, 1988 to 1999; and Team Rector of Waltham Abbey from 1999 to 2009.
