= St Paul's Cathedral School =

Location
- New Change; London; United Kingdom; 51.513953°N 0.096842°W

Information
- Type: Private preparatory school Choral foundation school
- Motto: Latin: Fide et Literis (By Faith and By Learning)
- Religious affiliation: Church of England
- Established: 1123; 903 years ago
- Local authority: City of London
- Department for Education URN: 100002 Tables
- Bursar: Steve Vickery
- Head teacher: Judith Fremont-Barnes
- Staff: 40~
- Gender: Co-educational
- Age: 4 to 13
- Enrolment: 240~
- Houses: Boyce, de la Mare, Groves, Stainer
- Colours: Burgundy and Blue
- Former pupils (choristers): Old Paulcathes (members of the Guild of the Companions of St Paul)
- Website: spcslondon.com

St Paul's Cathedral School is an independent preparatory school associated with St Paul's Cathedral in London, in New Change in the City of London.

The school has around 220 pupils, most of whom are day pupils, both boys and girls, including up to 40 boy choristers who are all boarders and who sing the daily services in St Paul's Cathedral. The school became co-educational in 2002.

== History ==
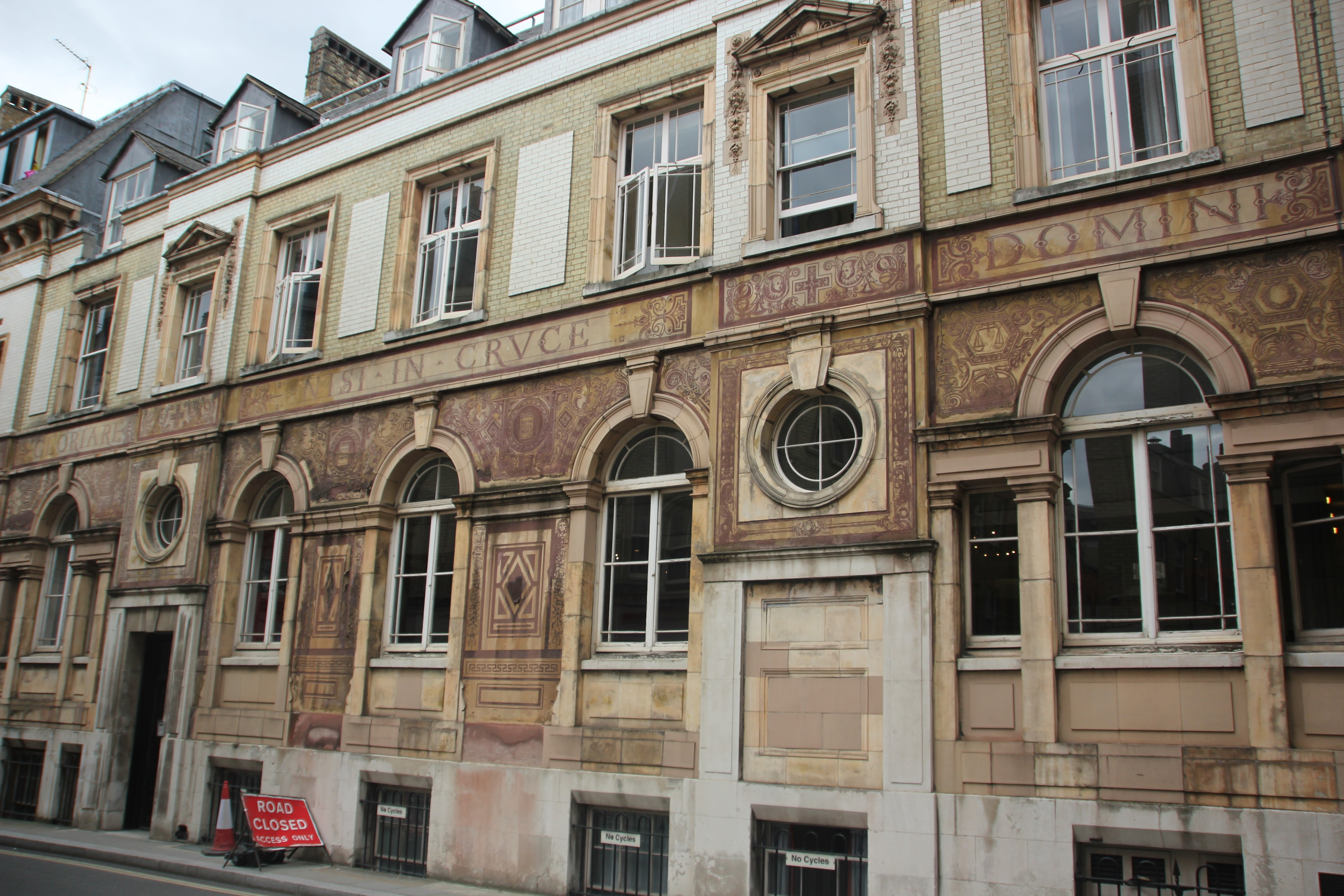
Cathedral School of 1874, now a Youth Hostel; frontage to Carter Lane

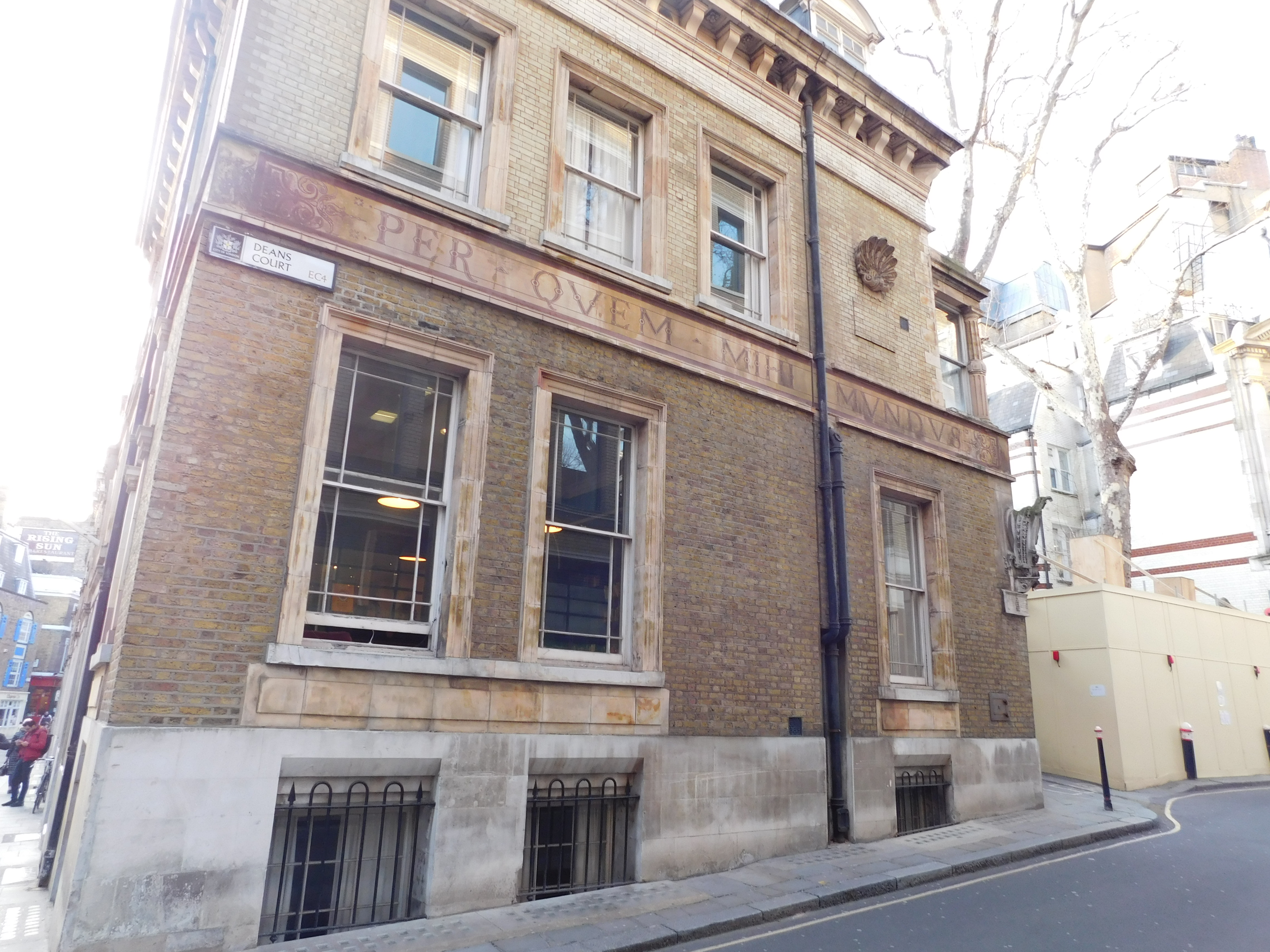
Cathedral School of 1874, frontage to Dean's Court

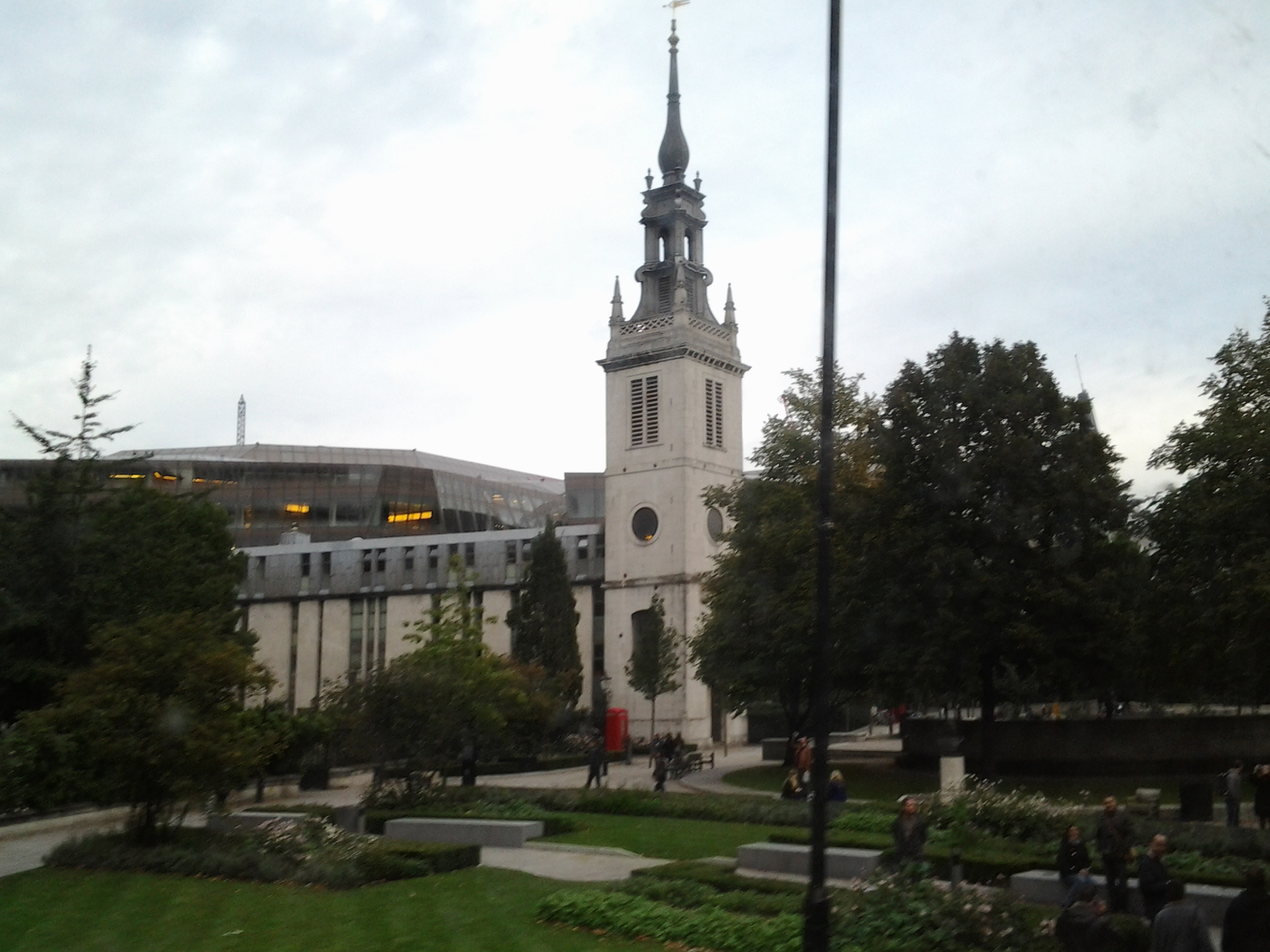
Present site of St Paul's Cathedral School, from the south-east. The tower is all that remains of St Augustine, Watling Street

Originally the school was set up to provide education solely for the choristers and dates from about 1123, when eight needy children were given a home and education in return for singing in the cathedral. The Choir School and a grammar school co-existed under the aegis of the cathedral for many years, until the Grammar School was moved and re-established in 1511 by the humanist Dean John Colet to become St Paul's School. The Cathedral School and St Paul's School (now a public school) are now distinct and separate institutions.

The original Choir School, which stood in St Paul's Churchyard, was destroyed with the cathedral in the Great Fire of London in 1666. The school has had several incarnations being re-built in 1670, in 1822 (in Cheapside) and 1875 (in Carter Lane). The building of 1875 is now a Youth Hostel. The current buildings date from the 1960s and were designed by the Architects' Co-Partnership.

== Activities ==
In addition to the daily Evensong, the choristers of St. Paul's Cathedral, have taken part in a number of important recordings and tours and have performed at a number of important state occasions, including the funerals of Winston Churchill and Margaret Thatcher, as well as the wedding of Prince Charles and Diana, Princess of Wales.

== Child-abuse controversy ==
In December 2007 Stephen Douglas-Hogg, a former Classics and house master of the school, was arrested and charged with the abuse of a number of choristers during the 1980s. Following his attempted suicide during the initial stages of proceedings in October 2008, the 50-year-old Douglas-Hogg changed his plea halfway through the trial and admitted to 13 counts of indecent assault on five boys aged under 14. On 11 May 2009 Douglas-Hogg was sentenced to four and a half years' imprisonment at Southwark Crown Court.

== Former pupils ==
Notable former pupils include:

- Jonathan Battishill, composer
- Simon Russell Beale, actor
- William Boyce, composer
- Elwin Cockett, archdeacon
- Alastair Cook, cricketer
- William Cummings, musician and organist
- Charles Dixon, politician
- Jimmy Edwards, script writer and actor
- Richard Gibson, actor
- Maurice Greene, composer
- Charles Groves, orchestral conductor
- Robin Holloway, composer
- Neil Howlett, opera singer
- Henry Jackman, composer
- James Lancelot, organist
- Walter de la Mare, poet and novelist
- Stephen Oliver, composer
- Julian Ovenden, actor and singer
- Peter Philips, composer and organist
- Percy Sillitoe, policeman, Director General of MI5 1946–1953
- John Stainer, composer and organist
- Marius de Vries, composer and music producer
- Anthony Way, chorister and classical singer

== See also ==
- List of the oldest schools in the United Kingdom
