= Akosombo International School =

Location
- P. O. Box 77 Akosombo; Eastern Region; Ghana
- Coordinates: 6.285278°N 0.053194°E

Information
- Type: Private high school
- Established: 1962 (64 years ago)
- Founder: Volta River Authority (VRA)
- Status: Active
- School district: Asuogyaman District
- Authority: VRA International School Limited (VISL)
- Oversight: Volta River Authority; Ghana Education Service
- Headteacher: Sarah Freda Adei
- Gender: Co-educational
- Age: 14 to 18
- Education system: Ghana Education Service (GES) Cambridge
- Classes offered: business; general arts; home economics; general science; visual arts
- Houses: 4 houses; Ames Dobson Kaizer Quartey
- Colour: Yellow Blue White
- Slogan: Truth is our Light
- Song: School Anthem - AIS, Truth is our Light School Hymn - Like a River Glorious
- Nickname: AIS

Akosombo International School (AIS) is a Ghanaian coeducational international second-cycle institution located at Akosombo in the Asuogyaman District of the Eastern Region. It is operated by the Volta River Authority.

== History ==
The school was established in 1962 by the Volta River Authority.

== Notable former pupils ==
- Kwabena Bediako, scientist
- Elwin Cockett, the Archdeacon of West Ham in the Church of England
- Samira Bawumia, the Second Lady of the Republic of Ghana.
- Lucia Addae, Executive Secretary of West Africa Pharmaceutical Manufacturers Association (WAPMA)
- Lydia Forson, Actress, Writer, Producer
- Jessica Opare-Saforo, Media personality, TV and radio broadcaster
- Selly Galley, Actress and TV Presenter
- Shirley Ayorkor Botchwey, Commonwealth Secretary General, Former Minister of Foreign Affairs Ghana
- Cynthia Ofori-Dwumfuor, Communication, Marketing and PR Professional
- Yves Hanson-Nortey, Ghanaian Politician
- Gwen Gyimah Addo,

== See also ==
- Education in Ghana
- List of international schools
- List of senior high schools in Ghana
