= Jessica Opare-Saforo =

Ghanaian media personality (born 1981)

- Born: 29 April 1981 (age 45)
- Education: Akosombo International School
- Alma mater: University of Ghana
- Occupations: Journalist, Radio presenter
- Years active: 2000–present
- Known for: Brunch in The Citi, Transformation with Jess

Jessica Opare Saforo (born 29 April 1981) is a Ghanaian media personality, TV and radio broadcaster, and YouTuber entrepreneur. Also, she is the host of Transformation with Jess, Ghana's first-ever weight loss reality TV show. She is the owner of The Voice Ova Company, a business that specializes in managing voice talent.

== Education ==
Saforo had her secondary education at Akosombo International School and holds a bachelor's degree in art from the University of Ghana, Legon where she majored in Economics and Psychology.

== Career ==
Saforo has worked in radio for about 20 years and TV for about 16 years hence she is one of the longest-serving presenters on the Ghanaian scene. She started working as a radio presenter in 2000 at Vibe FM and then in 2004 moved to Choice FM. She later moved to Citi FM in 2005 where she became the host for Citi Drive and then Brunch in The Citi and The Traffic Avenue. She used to be the co-host of Celebrity Fanzone on GH One TV, an award-winning celebrity and lifestyle show but now hosts Sister Sister, an all-women relationship talk show. She was the programme manager of Citi 97.3 FM and Citi TV, two of Ghana's most influential channels.

She is the owner of The Voice Ova Company, a business that specializes in producing professional radio and television ads and managing voice talent and also the Founder of Biker Girls GH. Jessica also hosted Miss Malaika Ghana and Stars of the Future for several years. With over 22 years of experience in the Ghanaian media space, Jessica Opare-Saforo currently runs her own media company and YouTube channels, with the core focus on relationships and life coaching

GhanaWeekend reported that Saforo had quit Citi FM and Citi TV on January 28, 2022. She had hosted a series of programs in the media network; 'Brunch in the Citi', 'Sex in the Citi', 'Sister Sister', 'Upside Down' and 'Traffic Avenue' (formerly 'Citi Drive') which is Citi FM's late afternoon show.

== Awards ==
Here are some awards she has won:

Year	Nominee / work	Award	Result
2013	Jessica Opare Saforo	Radio and Television Personality Awards (Best Mid-Morning Show Host)	Won
2014	Jessica Opare Saforo	Radio and Television Personality Awards (Female Radio Presenter of the Year)	Won
2014	Jessica Opare Saforo	Eagles Summit Africa Leadership and Empowerment Awards (Female Radio Personality of the Year)	Won
2015	Jessica Opare Saforo	DJ Awards (Best Female Radio DJ)	Won
2015	Jessica Opare Saforo	Radio and Television Personality Awards (Radio Late Afternoon Show host of the year)	Won
2015	Jessica Opare Saforo	Radio and Television Personality Awards (Best Female Radio Presenter)	Won
2016	Jessica Opare Saforo	Radio and Television Personality Awards (Personality of the Year)	Nominated
2016	Jessica Opare Saforo	Radio and Television Personality Awards (Radio Late Afternoon Show host of the year)	Nominated
2016	Jessica Opare Saforo	Radio and Television Personality Awards (Radio Female Presenter of the Year)	Nominated
