= William Spigurnell =

Canon of Windsor and Archdeacon of Colchester (1390s–1420s)

William Spigurnell (also Spygurnell) (fl. 1390s - 1420s) was a Canon of Windsor from 1395 to 1425 and Archdeacon of Colchester.

== Career ==
He was appointed:

- Prebendary of Erdington in the King's free chapel of Bridgnorth 1391.
- Archdeacon of Colchester 1411 - 1425

He was appointed to the fifth stall in St George's Chapel, Windsor Castle in 1394 and held the canonry until 1425.
