= Joseph Jefferson (priest) =

Joseph Jefferson was Archdeacon of Colchester from 1812 until his death on 28 December 1821.

At the time of his death he was Rector of Weeley and Vicar of Witham. His son, also called Joseph, was an Anglican clergyman.

== Notes ==
Church of England titles
Preceded by Anthony Hamilton	Archdeacon of Colchester; 1812–1821	Succeeded by Charles James Blomfield
