= Harold Frankham =

Anglican priest

Harold Edward Frankham (1911–1996) was an Anglican priest.

Harold Frankham was born on 6 April 1911 and ordained in 1941. He began his career with curacies in Luton and Brompton. He held incumbencies in Addiscombe, Middleton and Luton before being appointed Provost of Southwark Cathedral in 1970. He retired 12 years later and died on 17 January 1996.

Church of England titles
Preceded by Ernest William Southcott	Provost of Southwark; 1970–1982	Succeeded by David Lawrence Edwards
