= Neville Welch =

English bishop (1906–1999)

William Neville Welch (30 April 1906 – 3 February 1999) was the first Bishop of Bradwell in Essex from 1968 to 1973.

Born on 30 April 1906, he was educated at Dean Close School, Cheltenham and Keble College, Oxford and studied for ordination at Wycliffe Hall, Oxford before a curacy in Kidderminster. From 1934, he was Secretary to the Mission to Seamen. Following this he was Vicar of Grays then Ilford; Rural Dean of Barking; and finally, before his elevation to the episcopate, Archdeacon of Southend. He retired to Witham.

Church of England titles
Preceded by Inaugural appointment	Bishop of Bradwell; 1968–1973	Succeeded by John Gibbs
