= Kate Peacock (priest) =

The Ven. Kate Rebecca Peacock (born 15 September 1978) is an Anglican priest who has served as Archdeacon of Stansted since 2023.

Peacock graduated from Durham University in 2000 with a degree in theology. She completed her clerical training at Westcott House, Cambridge and was ordained deacon in 2003 and priest in 2004.
