= Archdeacon of Colchester =

Church of England ecclesiastical office

The Archdeacon of Colchester is a senior ecclesiastical officer in the Diocese of Chelmsford – she or he has responsibilities within her archdeaconry (the Archdeaconry of Colchester) including oversight of church buildings and some supervision, discipline and pastoral care of the clergy.

== History ==
The title first appears in sources before 1144, as one of four archdeacons in the (then much larger) Diocese of London, but there had been four archdeacons prior to this point, some of whom may be regarded as essentially predecessors in the line of the Colchester archdeacons. The territorial archdeaconry remained part of the London diocese for about 700 years, until, on 1 January 1846, it was transferred by Order in Council to the Diocese of Rochester. The archdeaconry was afterwards in the newly created Diocese of St Albans from 4 May 1877 until her transfer to the Diocese of Chelmsford upon her creation on 23 January 1914. On 1 February 2013, by Pastoral Order of the Bishop of Chelmsford, the new Archdeaconry of Stansted was created from the Colchester archdeaconry; initially, the Archdeacon of Colchester was also Acting Archdeacon of Stansted.

== List of archdeacons ==
=== High Medieval ===
- bef. 1102–aft. 1115: Quintilian (Note: These archdeacons never occur with the title Archdeacon of Colchester, but occur with fellow archdeacons or other colleagues such that their territorial role can be deduced.)
- bef. 1115–aft. 1132: Cyprian son of Quintilian
- bef. 1138–aft. 1138: Geoffrey
- bef. 1142–aft. 1152: Ailward
- ?–c. 1154 (ren.): Henry of London (renounced claim)
- bef. 1155–aft. 1166: William
- bef. 1168–aft. 1178: Richard Foliot I
- aft. 1180–aft. 1190: Ralph de Alta Ripa
- bef. 1192–bef. 1217 (d.): Richard of Ely
- bef. 1218–1228 (res.): Roger Niger
- bef. 1231–1238 (d.): Hugh of London II
- bef. 1248–aft. 1252: Robert de Insula
- bef. 1249–aft. 1249: Ralph de Insula (very probably vice-archdeacon)
- aft. 1253–aft. 1260: Hugh de Sancto Edmundo
- aft. 1263–21 November 1285 (d.): Fulke Lovell
- bef. 1287–aft. 1299: Giles Filliol

=== Late Medieval ===
- bef. 1302–aft. 1302: Richard Newport
- bef. 1304–aft. 1310: John de Chishull
- bef. 1311–bef. 1336 (d.): William de Meleford
- 3 March 1337–bef. 1348: William de Stowe
- bef. 1348–bef. 1362 (d.): Richard de Plessis
- 10 April 1363 – 26 September 1373 (exch.): Michael Northburgh (son)
- 26 September 1373 – 1387 (d.): Richard de Piriton
- bef. 1393–bef. 1398 (res.): John de Carleton
- 3 November 1398 – 1406 (res.): Thomas More (afterwards Dean of St Paul's)
- 17 January 1406 – 24 November 1411 (exch.): Richard de Kingston
- 24 November 1411–bef. 1425 (d.): William Spygurnell
- 7 February 1425 (installed): Henry Wodechurche (evidently ineffective)
- 14 February 1425 (installed): Peter Hynewyk (evidently ineffective)
- 23 March 1425–bef. 1433 (res.): William Duffield
- 19 May 1433–bef. 1440 (res.): John Stopyngton
- 3 April 1440–bef. 1449 (d.): Robert Aiscough
- 15 February 1449 – 1450 (res.): Nicholas Close
- bef. 1450–aft. 1450: John Thurston
- bef. 1451–1465 (res.): Robert Stillington
- 10 February 1466–bef. 1483 (d.): Benedict Burgh
- 18 July 1483–bef. 1499 (d.): Thomas Barow
- 9 July 1499–bef. 1509: John Maynwaring
- bef. 1509–bef. 1519 (d.): John Perott
- 16 February–October 1519 (res.): Richard Pace
- 22 October 1519 – 1523 (res.): John Clerk
- 19 November 1523 – 1531 (res.): Edward Lee
- 30 December 1531 – 1537 (res.): Robert Aldrich
- 1 October 1537–bef. 1543 (d.): Richard Curwen

=== Early modern ===
- 23 March 1543 – 1552 (d.): Anthony Belasyse
- 10 January 1553 – 22 January 1554 (rem.): John Standish
- 22 January 1554–bef. 1557: Hugh Weston (deprived of office for immorality)
- 15 October 1558 – 23 October 1559 (deprived): John Standish (again; deprived)
- 4 December 1559–bef. 1565 (d.): John Pullain
- 16 July 1565 – 1570: James Calfhill
- 11 October 1570–aft. 1593: George Withers
- 8 January 1596–bef. 1617 (d.): Thomas Withers
- 10 April 1617 – 1641 (res.): Henry King
- 15 April 1642 – 22 June 1643 (d.): Josias Shute
- 22 June 1643–bef. 1660: Vacancy (English Interregnum)
- bef. 1660–1667 (d.): John Hansley
- 2 February 1667–bef. 1675 (d.): William Wells
- 25 August 1675–bef. 1678 (d.): Charles Smith
- 24 September 1678–September 1681 (res.): William Sill
- 3 November 1681 – 1704 (res.): William Beveridge
- 9 August 1704 – 9 August 1722 (d.): Jonas Warley
- 14 August 1722 – 4 August 1737 (d.): John King
- 24 August 1737 – 8 November 1749 (d.): Thomas Cartwright
- 29 November 1749 – 1766 (res.): Charles Moss
- 12 December 1766 – 19 January 1775 (d.): William Powell
- 6 February 1775 – 4 October 1812 (d.): Anthony Hamilton
- 16 November 1812 – 28 December 1821 (d.): Joseph Jefferson
- 15 January 1822 – 1824 (res.): Charles James Blomfield
- 4 June 1824–bef. 1841 (res.): William Lyall
- 7 July 1841 – 27 March 1845 (d.): Herbert Oakeley
- 28 August 1845 – 1 November 1864 (d.): Charles Burney

The archdeaconry was transferred to the Rochester diocese on 1 January 1846.

=== Late modern ===
- 1864–1882: William Ady

The archdeaconry was transferred to the new St Albans diocese on 4 May 1877.

- 1882–1894 (d.): Alfred Blomfield, Bishop suffragan of Colchester
- 1894–7 December 1908 (d.): Henry Johnson, Bishop suffragan of Colchester
- 1909–19 March 1922 (d.): Robert Whitcombe, Bishop suffragan of Colchester

The archdeaconry was transferred to the new Chelmsford diocese on 23 January 1914.

- 1922–1933 (ret.): Thomas Chapman, Bishop suffragan of Colchester
- 1933–1946 (ret.): Charles Ridsdale, Bishop suffragan of Colchester
- 1946–1959 (res.): Dudley Narborough, Bishop suffragan of Colchester
- 1959–1969 (ret.): Aubrey Cleall (afterwards archdeacon emeritus)
- 1969–1972 (res.): Roderic Coote, Bishop suffragan of Colchester
- 1972–1976 (res.): Derek Bond
- 1977–1983 (res.): James Roxburgh
- 1983–1997 (ret.): Ernest Stroud (afterwards archdeacon emeritus)
- 1997–2003 (res.): Martin Wallace
- 2004 – November 2018 (ret.): Annette Cooper
- 12 May 2019 – present: Ruth Patten

== Sources ==
- Greenway, Diana E. (1968), Fasti Ecclesiae Anglicanae 1066–1300, vol. 1, pp. 18–20
- Horn, Joyce M. (1963), Fasti Ecclesiae Anglicanae 1300–1541, vol. 5, pp. 13–14
- Horn, Joyce M. (1969), Fasti Ecclesiae Anglicanae 1541–1857, vol. 1, pp. 12–14
- Horn, Joyce M. (1974), Fasti Ecclesiae Anglicanae 1541–1857, vol. 3, p. 59
