= Helen Wilcox =

British literary scholar (born 1955)

Helen Wilcox FRSA FRSL FLSW
- Born: Helen Elizabeth Boulton; 1955 (age 70–71)
- Occupation: Literary scholar
- Spouse: Allan Wilcox
- Children: 2

Academic background
- Education: University of Birmingham; University of Oxford
- Thesis: Something understood: The reputation and influence of George Herbert to 1715 (1984)

Academic work
- Discipline: English studies
- Sub-discipline: Renaissance studies
- Institutions: University of Liverpool; University of Groningen; Bangor University

Helen Elizabeth Wilcox FRSA FRSL FLSW (née Boulton; born 1955) is a British literary scholar who specializes in early modern English literature. She is Professor of English Literature at Bangor University.

== Biography ==
Helen Elizabeth Wilcox was born in 1955. She was educated at the University of Birmingham, where she received her Bachelor of Arts degree in English Language and Literature in 1976, and the University of Oxford, where she earned her Doctor of Philosophy in 1984. Her thesis was titled The Reputation and Influence of George Herbert to 1715.

She later worked as a lecturer in English literature at the University of Liverpool from 1979 until 1991, when she moved to the University of Groningen as a professor of English literature. She later moved to Bangor University, where she became Professor of English Literature.

As an academic, she specialises in Early Modern English literature, especially Christian devotional literature, William Shakespeare, and the early modern history of women's writing. She was the sole editor of Women and Literature in Britain 1500-1700 (1996). She also has co-edited several books specializing in English literature, some of which were also on the poet George Herbert. In 2014, she authored a book, 1611: Authority, Gender and the Word in Early Modern England.

She was appointed Fellow of the Royal Society of Literature in 1999. She was elected Fellow of the Learned Society of Wales in 2015. She is also a Fellow of the English Association and a Fellow of the Royal Society of Arts.

== Personal life ==
Wilcox is married to Allan Wilcox and they have two sons together.

== Bibliography ==
- (as co-editor, with H. Hinds, E. Hobby, and E. Graham) Her Own Life: Autobiographical Writings by Seventeenth Century Englishwomen (1989)
- (as co-editor, with A. Thompson) Teaching Women: Feminism and English Studies (1989)
- (as co-editor, with K. McWalters, A. Thompson, and L. R. Williams) The Body and the Text: Helene Cixous, Reading, and Teaching (1990)
- (as co-editor, with R. Todd) George Herbert, Sacred and Profane (1995)
- (as co-editor, with R. Todd and A. MacDonald) Sacred and Profane: The Interplay of Secular and Devotional Literature in Early Modern Britain (1996)
- (as editor) Women and Literature in Britain 1500-1700 (1996)
- (as co-editor, with H. Dragstra and S. Ottway) Betraying Our Selves: Forms of Self-Representation in Early Modern English Texts (2000)
- (as co-editor, with H. Wilcox) The English Poems of George Herbert (2007)
- (as co-editor, with I. Visser and H. Wilcox) Transforming Holiness: Representations of Holiness in English and American Literary Texts (2006)
- 1611: Authority, Gender and the Word in Early Modern England (2014)
- (as co-editor, with A. W. Johnson and R. D. Sell) Community-Making in Early Stuart Theatres: Stage and Audience (2016)
- (as editor) George Herbert: 100 poems (2016)
- (as co-editor, with A. Hiscock) The Oxford Handbook of Early Modern English Literature and Religion (2017)
- (as co-editor, with S. Gossett) All's Well That Ends Well (2018)
