= Ernest Southcott =

Ernest William Southcott (1915–1976) was an Anglican priest and author.

He was born on 8 May 1915 and educated at the University of British Columbia. Ordained in 1938 after a period of study at the College of the Resurrection, Mirfield, he began his career with curacies at St John's, Shildon and St James's, Gateshead. He was Vicar of St Wilfrid's, Halton, Leeds, where he pioneered the House Church movement, and then Rural Dean of Whitkirk until 1961 when he was appointed Provost of Southwark Cathedral. He resigned Southwark in 1970 and became Vicar of Rishton in Lancashire. He died on 17 January 1976.

Southcott was notable for his height- six feet six inches- and his conducting of services in parishioners' houses, celebrating communion at family dinner tables. On this subject, Southcott pronounced: 'We don't go to church; we are the Church.' Nevertheless, his own services were so popular that the church was full half an hour before proceedings began. It took him 5 years to convince St. Wilfrid's parishioners that the baptismal font ought to be in the center of the church. For Southcott, baptism was a public occasion, at which the child is received into the church, and at which the entire congregation is present, to accept responsibility for the child and his future.

Church of England titles
| Preceded by George Edmund Reindorp | Provost of Southwark; 1961 – 1968 | Succeeded by Harold Edward Frankham |
