= St James-the-Less, Bethnal Green =

- Church of St James-the-Less, Bethnal Green
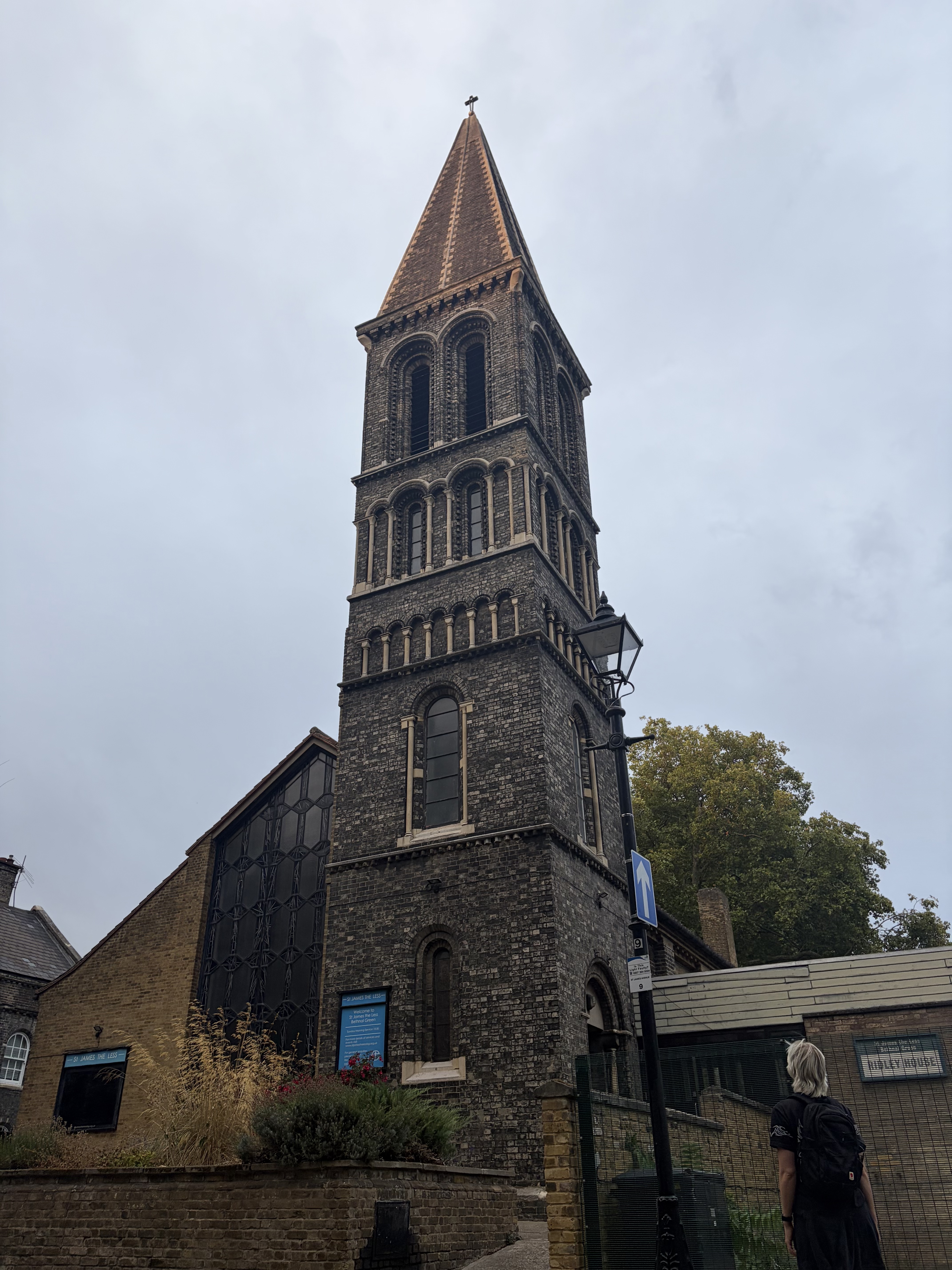
- View of St James-the-Less, Bethnal Green
- St James-the-Less, Bethnal Green
- Location: St James’s Avenue, Bethnal Green, Tower Hamlets, London E2 9JD
- Country: England
- Denomination: Church of England
- Website: www.stjamesthelessbg.org.uk

Administration
- Diocese: London

St James-the-Less is a church in Bethnal Green, London, England. It is an Anglican church in the Diocese of London. The church is in the London Borough of Tower Hamlets. Prior to 1965 it was in the Metropolitan Borough of Bethnal Green.

== History ==
St James-the-Less Church was built as a commissioners' church in 1840–2 and a district was assigned in 1843, taken from the parish of St Matthew's, Bethnal Green. The church was built with yellow, red, and white brick and stone in a Romanesque style and the architect was Lewis Vulliamy. It had a shallow semi-circular apse, wide aisled nave with galleries and a square south west tower with spire.

It suffered bomb damage in the 1940s and was rebuilt by J. A. Lewis, preserving the north and south walls, chancel arch, and tower. Stained glass windows by Keith New were added c.1959. The church was reconsecrated in 1961. The building was Grade II listed in 1973.

== School ==
The St James-the-Less National School on St James's Road and Sewardstone Road was built 1858. It had an adjoining teacher's house in St James's Road. George Lansbury attended the school from 1868 to 1870. The school was in disrepair by late 1898 and in 1900 the girls and infants' school was converted into parochial buildings.

== Notable clergy ==
- From 1906 to 1908, Frank Buttle was the Assistant Curate.
- John Watts Ditchfield was Vicar from 1908 at least before being appointed first Bishop of Chelmsford in 1914.
- From 1999 to 2006, Rachel Treweek was the Vicar. In 2015 she became the Bishop of Gloucester, the first woman to become a diocesan bishop in the Church of England

== See also ==
- List of Commissioners' churches in London
