= Colin Slee =

The Very Reverend Colin Slee OBE
- Dean of Southwark
- Church: Church of England
- Diocese: Diocese of Southwark
- In office: 1994–2010
- Other post: Sub-Dean of St Albans Cathedral (1982–1994)

Orders
- Ordination: 1970

Personal details
- Born: Colin Bruce Slee; 10 November 1945 West London
- Died: 25 November 2010 (aged 65) Southwark, London
- Education: King's College London; St Augustine's College, Canterbury

Colin Bruce Slee, OBE (10 November 1945 – 25 November 2010) was a priest in the Church of England, most notable for his final position as Dean of Southwark Cathedral from 1994 until his death.

A friend of Desmond Tutu and Rowan Williams, Slee's churchmanship was liberal (he was influenced by the book Honest to God during his youth) and Anglo-Catholic. He gave his backing to Jeffrey John's nomination as a bishop in 2003 and was opposed to the use of the hymn "Jerusalem" in church.

== Early life ==
Slee was born on 10 November 1945 in West London, as the son of a policeman. He was educated at Ealing Grammar School for Boys and then spent nearly two years in Papua New Guinea on Voluntary Service Overseas before studying theology at King's College London (where he won a university "purple" in rowing). He then studied for ordination at St Augustine's College, Canterbury.

== Ordained ministry ==
Slee was ordained in 1970 and was a curate at St Francis' Heartsease, Norwich. His next positions were a curacy at Great St Mary's in Cambridge and chaplain of Girton College (1973–76), chaplain of King's College London (1976–1982) as well as chief coach to the college's boat club, a role he continued after becoming a residential canon and Sub-Dean of St Albans Cathedral (1982–94).

Slee became Provost of Southwark Cathedral in 1994, a title which was changed to Dean of Southwark in 1999. Whilst in post, he oversaw the building of a new library, conference centre and refectory. He also built links with the chapel of Harvard University (becoming an honorary lecturer at its divinity school). In June 2010 he invited Katharine Jefferts Schori to preach at Southwark Cathedral.

Slee became a trustee of the Millennium Bridge and chaplain to Shakespeare's Globe. In 1995 he was elected to General Synod, serving until his death. He was also a member of the Crown Nominations Committee from 2006 onwards, chairman of the Tutu Foundation and involved in the Winston Churchill Memorial Trust Fellowship, the British School of Osteopathy and the International Network Focus on New Religious Movements (INFORM). In 2007 conservatives successfully opposed his appointment as Bishop of Christchurch in New Zealand.

Slee died in November 2010 of pancreatic cancer.

== Personal life ==
In 1971 he married Edith Tryon, who was born in New Zealand. They had three children and two foster children.

== Honours ==
In the 2001 Queen's Birthday Honours, Slee was appointed an Officer of the Order of the British Empire (OBE) "for services to the community". He was also a Fellow of King's College London, the highest award that can be bestowed upon an individual by the college.
