= John Perumbalath =

Anglican bishop (born 1966)

The Right Reverend Dr John Perumbalath
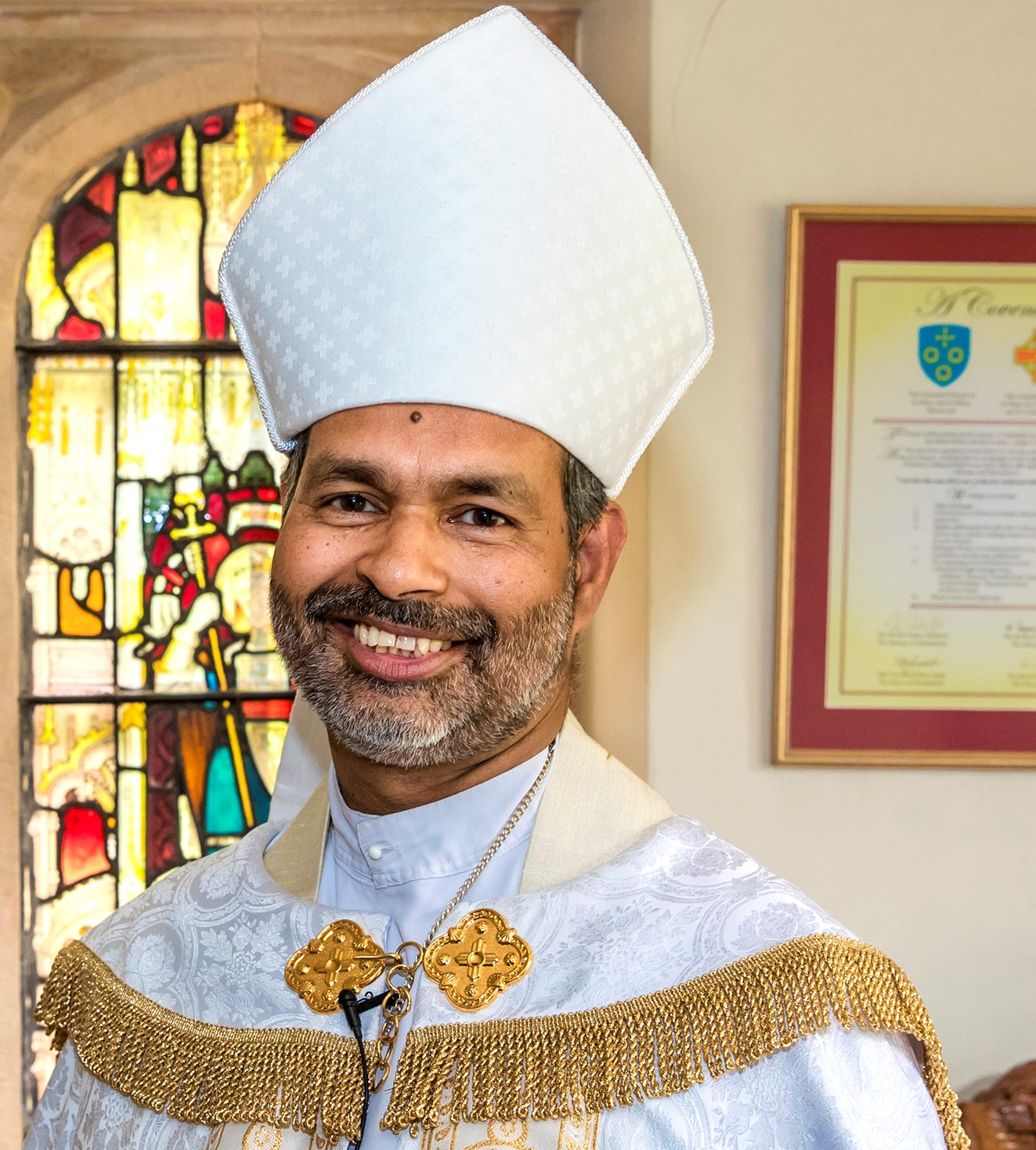
- Perumbalath in 2018
- Church: Church of England
- Diocese: Liverpool
- In office: 2023–2025
- Predecessor: Paul Bayes
- Previous posts: Bishop of Bradwell (2018–2023); Chairman, Committee for Minority Ethnic Anglican Concerns (CMEAC 2015–2018); Archdeacon of Barking (2013–2018); Proctor in Convocation (2010–2013 & 2015–2018)

Orders
- Ordination: 1994 (deacon); 1995 (priest) by Dinesh Chandra Gorai
- Consecration: 3 July 2018 by Justin Welby

Personal details
- Born: 23 May 1966 (age 60) Kerala, India
- Denomination: Anglican
- Residence: London

John Perumbalath (born 23 May 1966) is a British retired Anglican bishop. He became Bishop of Liverpool in the Church of England Diocese of Liverpool in January 2023. He had previously been Archdeacon of Barking (2013–2018) and the area Bishop of Bradwell (2018–2023), both in the Diocese of Chelmsford.

== Early life and education ==
Perumbalath was born on 23 May 1966 in Mananthavady in the south Indian state of Kerala. He grew up in the Syrian Christians of India community. He obtained his first university degree in Political Science and Economics from Calicut University, studying at St Mary's College, Sulthan Bathery. He was a seminarian at the Union Biblical Seminary, Pune, from which he graduated with a Bachelor of Divinity (BD) degree in 1990. He later studied at the North India Institute of Post Graduate Theological Studies, Calcutta/Serampore (West Bengal) where he pursued postgraduate research in the New Testament. In 1993, he was awarded a Master of Arts (MA) degree in Philosophy by Osmania University and a Master of Theology (MTh) degree by Serampore College. He pursued doctoral research in hermeneutics under Judith Lieu at King's College London from 2001 to 2004 but discontinued and later submitted the dissertation for a PhD from North-West University, South Africa, in 2007. His doctoral thesis was titled "Confident and imaginative: scripture & hermeneutic in the Johannine passion narrative and today" and was undertaken within a post-liberal theological framework.

== Career ==
Perumbalath worked among university students as a staff worker of the Evangelical Union for two years in his home state of Kerala before training for ordination. Following his post-graduate research, he joined the faculty of Serampore College as a lecturer in New Testament. He was ordained in the Church of North India as a deacon in 1994 and priest in 1995 for the Diocese of Calcutta. After a short curacy at St John's Church, Calcutta, in 1995 he was appointed vicar of St James' Church, Calcutta.

After moving to the UK in 2001, he joined the Church of England and served at St George's Church, Beckenham in the Diocese of Rochester as an associate rector from 2002 to 2005. He was then team vicar of the benefice of Northfleet and Rosherville (2005–2008) and vicar of All Saints, Perry Street, Northfleet (2008–2013). From 2008 to 2013, he was the chair of the North Kent Council for Inter-faith Relations and also the Diocese of Rochester's urban adviser and link officer for the Church Urban Fund.

In 2013, he was appointed as Archdeacon of Barking, a newly created post, in the Diocese of Chelmsford. He was collated as archdeacon on 15 September 2013 with the oversight of the Anglican churches in the London Boroughs of Barking & Dagenham and Havering. During this time he chaired the Church of England's Committee for Minority Ethnic Anglican Concerns (CMEC), chaired the London Churches Refugee Network and was a member of the Mission and Public Affairs Council of the Church of England.

=== Episcopal ministry ===
On 9 March 2018, Perumbalath was announced as the next Bishop of Bradwell, a suffragan bishop in the Diocese of Chelmsford. He was consecrated as bishop by Archbishop Justin Welby on 3 July 2018 at St Paul's Cathedral, and was installed at Chelmsford Cathedral on 22 July.

On 18 October 2022, the Prime Minister's Office announced that Queen Elizabeth II had accepted Perumbalath's nomination as the next Bishop of Liverpool. On 25 November 2022, he was elected by the college of canons of Liverpool Cathedral to become the next Bishop of Liverpool. The confirmation of his election – by which he legally took up the see of Liverpool – was on 20 January 2023 at York Minster. He was enthroned in the Liverpool Cathedral on 22 April 2023.

Perumbalath chairs the council of the College of the Resurrection, Mirfield, and serves on the Clergy Discipline Commission of the Church of England. He also chairs the Churches Refugee Network for Britain and Ireland, CTBI. He is the Church of England's Lead Bishop for Porvoo Communion of churches (group of Lutheran churches in Europe) and is on the communion-wide advisory group of the USPG, an Anglican mission society.

In January 2025, it became public that he had been accused by two women of sexual harassment, following a broadcast by Channel 4 News. One woman alleged that he had forcibly kissed her and groped her while they were on a diocesan away day in 2019, which she then reported to an archdeacon. He was interviewed by police in March 2024 in relation to this accusation, but no further action was taken. The National Safeguarding Team had investigated the allegation in 2023 and had found it unsubstantiated. The other woman, later revealed to be Bev Mason, the Bishop of Warrington in the diocese of Liverpool, reported to senior clergy and the Archbishop of York in 2023 that she had been sexually harassed by Perumbalath in the cafe at the Church House during the General Synod meetings in February 2023. This was passed on to the National Safeguarding Team which concluded there was no safeguarding concern. Mason made a complaint of misconduct eighteen months later which was not taken further, as this was outside the 12-month limitation period under the Clergy Conduct Measure.

Perumbalath publicly denied the allegations on 28 January 2025, saying "I don't believe I have done anything wrong." The following day, senior members of the Diocese of Liverpool publicly called for him to "step aside from all ministry in the Diocese of Liverpool" until the allegations made by the female bishop had been fully investigated. On 30 January, he announced that he would "retire from active ministry in the Church of England" – in practice, he would "step back" with immediate effect, but resign his see at a later date. He stated that this was caused by the "rush to judgment and my trial by media (be that social or broadcast) has made my position untenable" and that it "is not a resignation occasioned by fault or by any admission of liability". He resigned the See of Liverpool effective 31 July 2025.

== Theological positions ==
Perumbalath is influenced by Oriental Orthodox, evangelical and Anglo-Catholic traditions, and follows a Benedictine framework for spirituality. He was born in the ancient Syrian Christian community in Kerala and trained for ordination at Union Biblical Seminary, a leading evangelical training college in India.

Perumbalath affirms the ordained ministry of women. Theologically he belongs to the post-critical tradition of theology with heavy influence of Hans Frei, George Lindbeck and Walter Brueggemann.

== Personal life ==
Perumbalath is married to Jessy who is a mathematics teacher. They have one daughter.

== Styles and titles ==
- The Reverend John Perumbalath (1994–2007)
- The Reverend Doctor John Perumbalath (2007–2013)
- The Venerable Doctor John Perumbalath (2013–2018)
- The Right Reverend Doctor John Perumbalath (2018–present)
