= John Watts Ditchfield =

Bishop of Chelmsford from 1914 to 1923

J. E. Watts-Ditchfield

John Edwin Watts-Ditchfield (17 September 1861 – 14 July 1923) was an eminent 20th century Anglican priest and distinguished author.

Educated at the Victoria University of Manchester and ordained in 1891, he began his career with a curacy at St Peter Highgate after which he was Vicar of St James-the-Less, Bethnal Green. Here, he made a name for himself, particularly with the development of the Church of England's Men's Society. He believed that the contemporary view of the Church of England was that it was for women and children, and he succeeded in attracting vast numbers of men to his church whose families followed. A gifted fund-raiser, he provided a medical service and a parish centre among other facilities for his poor parishioners. These activities brought him to the attention of not only the hierarchy but also of leading politicians. He was first considered for a bishopric when Lichfield became vacant in 1913, but he was not recommended by the Archbishop of Canterbury who wrote ‘Watts-Ditchfield with all his gifts is on a distinctly low plane. Not a graduate or a man of any mental calibre ... though a real power with working man and a very nice fellow’. Nevertheless, when the diocese of Chelmsford was created the following year, Watts-Ditchfield was appointed as its first bishop.

He was a vocal supporter of British involvement in the Great War but provoked controversy by permitting a woman to preach in a church, which at that time was frowned upon, and by emphasising ‘our own sins’ such as intemperance, class divisions, housing deficiencies. At a time when the unity of the nation was essential in the middle of a war, whatever the merits of Watts-Ditchfield's convictions, they seemed inappropriate, and were denounced as a ‘Flood of nonsense’.

Watts-Ditchfield, although not a graduate, had been a lecturer in Pastoral Theology at Cambridge just before the War and, during the later stages of the War, was a leading figure in the National Mission.

He died in post in 1923. There is a statue to him within Chelmsford Cathedral.

Church of England titles
New diocese	Bishop of Chelmsford; 1914–1923	Succeeded by Guy Warman
