= John Haldane (priest) =

Anglican priest

John Bernard Haldane was an Anglican priest in the 20th century.
He was born on 27 May 1881 and educated at Keble College, Oxford. Ordained in 1905 after a period of study at Ripon College Cuddesdon he began his career as Assistant Curate of St John East Dulwich after which he was Priest in charge of St John, Earlsfield. He was Precentor of Southwark Cathedral from 1919 to 1937 and then briefly its Provost. He died in post on 4 November 1938

Church of England titles
Preceded by Inaugural appointment	Provost of Southwark; 1937 – 1938	Succeeded by Frederick Dudley Vaughan Narborough
