= Ruth Patten =

Archdeacon of Colchester

Ruth Janet Patten (b 1972) has been Archdeacon of Colchester since 2019.

Patten was educated at the Roehampton Institute. She was ordained after a period of study at Westcott House Cambridge. Her first post was a curacy in Witham. She was Priest in charge at Great Dunmow before her appointment as Archdeacon.

Church of England titles
Preceded by Annette Cooper	Archdeacon of Colchester; 2019–	Succeeded by Incumbent
