= Diocese of Chelmsford =

Diocese of the Church of England

Coordinates: 51.7352°N 0.4723°E

Diocese of Chelmsford Dioecesis Chelmsfordiensis
- Coat of arms

- Flag

Location
- Ecclesiastical province: Canterbury
- Archdeaconries: Barking, Chelmsford, Colchester, Southend, Stansted, West Ham

Statistics
- Parishes: 463
- Churches: 588 (As of August 2014)
- Schools: 140

Information
- Formation: 23 January 1914
- Denomination: Church of England
- Cathedral: Chelmsford Cathedral
- Language: English

Current leadership
- Bishop: Guli Francis-Dehqani, Bishop of Chelmsford
- Suffragans: Roger Morris, area Bishop of Colchester; Lynne Cullens, area Bishop of Barking; Adam Atkinson, area Bishop of Bradwell
- Archdeacons: Christopher Burke, Archdeacon of Barking; Ruth Patten, Archdeacon of Colchester; Michael Power, Archdeacon of West Ham; Kathryn Peacock, Archdeacon of Stansted; Jonathan Croucher, Archdeacon of Chelmsford; Sue Lucas, Archdeacon of Southend

Website
- chelmsford.anglican.org

The Diocese of Chelmsford is a Church of England diocese, part of the Province of Canterbury. It was created on 23 January 1914 from part of the Diocese of St Albans. It covers Essex and part of East London. Since 1984 it is divided into three episcopal areas, each with its own area bishop. The diocese covers around 1,500 square miles (3,900 km^{2}) with a population of more than 3 million. It has 463 parishes and 588 churches.

== History ==
The diocese was created on 23 January 1914, as part of the provisions of the Bishoprics of Sheffield, Chelmsford and the County of Suffolk Act 1913. It covered the entire county of Essex and that part of Kent north of the River Thames (North Woolwich). The area had since 4 May 1877 been part of the Diocese of St Albans. Before 1 January 1846 the area was part of the Diocese of London and then the Diocese of Rochester.

== Geographic area ==
The diocese covers a region of around 1,500 square miles (3,900 km^{2}) and has a population of more than 3 million. It covers Essex and five East London boroughs of Barking and Dagenham, Havering, Newham, Redbridge, and Waltham Forest. The diocese has seen one of the strongest regenerations in Europe, which continues. The Thames Gateway, the M11 corridor, Stansted and Southend airports, Harwich, Tilbury, London Gateway, Purfleet ports and most of the housing built in connection with the London 2012 Olympics are in the diocese. It is co-terminous with the boundaries of the Catholic Diocese of Brentwood.

== Organisation ==
The diocese of Chelmsford is overseen by the Bishop of Chelmsford. Since the area scheme was created in 1983 and inaugurated in January 1984, the diocese has been divided into three episcopal areas which are overseen by an area bishop. The diocese is divided further into archdeaconries, each divided into a number of deaneries.

The suffragan See of Colchester was created in 1882, for the Diocese of St Albans until 1914. Barking in 1901 also for St Albans, and Bradwell in 1968.

Episcopal areas	Archdeaconries	Deaneries
Barking Episcopal Area (overseen by the area Bishop of Barking)
Barking Episcopal Area (overseen by the area Bishop of Barking)	Archdeaconry of West Ham	Deanery of Newham
Barking Episcopal Area (overseen by the area Bishop of Barking)	Archdeaconry of West Ham	Deanery of Redbridge
Barking Episcopal Area (overseen by the area Bishop of Barking)	Archdeaconry of West Ham	Deanery of Waltham Forest
Barking Episcopal Area (overseen by the area Bishop of Barking)	Archdeaconry of Barking	Deanery of Barking and Dagenham
Barking Episcopal Area (overseen by the area Bishop of Barking)	Archdeaconry of Barking	Deanery of Havering
Bradwell Episcopal Area (overseen by the area Bishop of Bradwell)	Archdeaconry of Chelmsford	Deanery of Brentwood
Bradwell Episcopal Area (overseen by the area Bishop of Bradwell)	Archdeaconry of Chelmsford	Deanery of Chelmsford North
Bradwell Episcopal Area (overseen by the area Bishop of Bradwell)	Archdeaconry of Chelmsford	Deanery of Chelmsford South
Bradwell Episcopal Area (overseen by the area Bishop of Bradwell)	Archdeaconry of Chelmsford	Deanery of Maldon and Dengie
Bradwell Episcopal Area (overseen by the area Bishop of Bradwell)	Archdeaconry of Chelmsford	Deanery of Epping Forest and Ongar
Bradwell Episcopal Area (overseen by the area Bishop of Bradwell)	Archdeaconry of Southend	Deanery of Basildon
Bradwell Episcopal Area (overseen by the area Bishop of Bradwell)	Archdeaconry of Southend	Deanery of Hadleigh
Bradwell Episcopal Area (overseen by the area Bishop of Bradwell)	Archdeaconry of Southend	Deanery of Rochford
Bradwell Episcopal Area (overseen by the area Bishop of Bradwell)	Archdeaconry of Southend	Deanery of Southend-on-Sea
Bradwell Episcopal Area (overseen by the area Bishop of Bradwell)	Archdeaconry of Southend	Deanery of Thurrock
Colchester Episcopal Area (overseen by the area Bishop of Colchester)	Archdeaconry of Colchester	Deanery of Colchester
Colchester Episcopal Area (overseen by the area Bishop of Colchester)	Archdeaconry of Colchester	Deanery of Harwich
Colchester Episcopal Area (overseen by the area Bishop of Colchester)	Archdeaconry of Colchester	Deanery of St Osyth
Colchester Episcopal Area (overseen by the area Bishop of Colchester)	Archdeaconry of Colchester	Deanery of Witham
Colchester Episcopal Area (overseen by the area Bishop of Colchester)	Archdeaconry of Stansted	Deanery of Braintree
Colchester Episcopal Area (overseen by the area Bishop of Colchester)	Archdeaconry of Stansted	Deanery of Dunmow and Stansted
Colchester Episcopal Area (overseen by the area Bishop of Colchester)	Archdeaconry of Stansted	Deanery of Hinckford
Colchester Episcopal Area (overseen by the area Bishop of Colchester)	Archdeaconry of Stansted	Deanery of Saffron Walden
Colchester Episcopal Area (overseen by the area Bishop of Colchester)	Archdeaconry of Stansted	Deanery of Harlow

=== Bishops ===
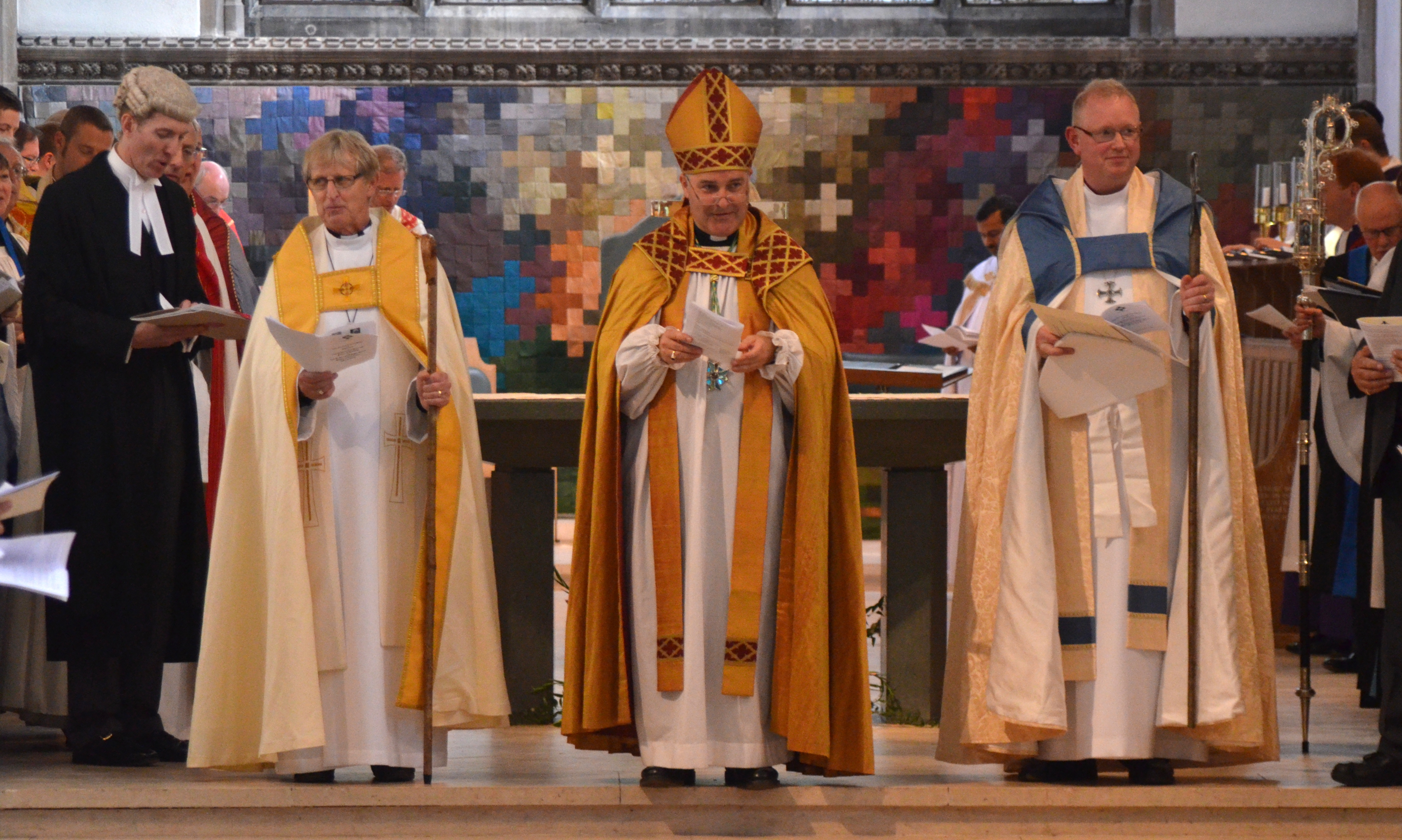
Left to right: Peter Hill, Bishop of Barking; Stephen Cottrell, Bishop of Chelmsford; Roger Morris, Bishop of Colchester

Alongside the diocesan Bishop of Chelmsford (Guli Francis-Dehqani), the Diocese has three area (suffragan) bishops: Roger Morris, area Bishop of Colchester; Lynne Cullens, area Bishop of Barking; and Adam Atkinson, area Bishop of Bradwell.

Alternative episcopal oversight (for parishes in the diocese which reject the ministry of priests who are women) is provided by the provincial episcopal visitor, Norman Banks, Bishop suffragan of Richborough, who is licensed as an honorary assistant bishop of the diocese in order to facilitate his work there.

== Churches ==
The diocese has 463 parishes and a total of 588 churches.

Deanery	Clergy	Church	Founded (building)
Epping Forest & Ongar	S. Brazier-Gibbs	St Laurence, Blackmore	Medieval
Epping Forest & Ongar	S. Brazier-Gibbs	SS Peter & Paul, Stondon Massey	
Epping Forest & Ongar	I. Farley	St John the Baptist, Buckhurst Hill	1837
Epping Forest & Ongar	H. Aucken	St Martin, Chipping Ongar	Medieval
Epping Forest & Ongar	H. Aucken	St Peter, Shelley	Medieval (1888)
Epping Forest & Ongar	H. Aucken	St Andrew, Greensted-juxta-Ongar	Anglo-Saxon
Epping Forest & Ongar	H. Aucken	St Margaret of Antioch, Stanford Rivers	Medieval
Epping Forest & Ongar	J. Fry	St John the Baptist, Epping	Medieval (1889)
Epping Forest & Ongar	J. Fry	All Saints, Epping Upland	Medieval
Epping Forest & Ongar	J. Fry	St Alban the Martyr, Coopersale	1852
Epping Forest & Ongar	J. Fry	St Andrew, North Weald Bassett	Medieval
Epping Forest & Ongar	C. Hawkins	St Germain, Bobbingworth	Medieval
Epping Forest & Ongar	C. Hawkins	St Mary the Virgin, Moreton	Medieval
Epping Forest & Ongar	C. Hawkins	St Nicholas, Fyfield	Medieval
Epping Forest & Ongar	C. Hawkins	St Christopher, Willingale	Medieval
Epping Forest & Ongar	J. Pickles	All Saints, High Laver	Medieval
Epping Forest & Ongar	J. Pickles	St Mary the Virgin, Little Laver	Medieval
Epping Forest & Ongar	J. Pickles	St Mary Magdalen, Magdalen Laver	Medieval
Epping Forest & Ongar	J. Pickles	St Mary, Matching	Medieval
Epping Forest & Ongar	C. Davies	St John the Baptist, Loughton	1846
Epping Forest & Ongar	C. Davies	St Nicholas, Loughton	Medieval (early C20th)
Epping Forest & Ongar	M. Macdonald M. White	St Mary the Virgin, Loughton	1871
Epping Forest & Ongar	L. Petitt	St Michael & All Angels, Loughton	1937
Epping Forest & Ongar	S. Gibbs	St Mary the Virgin, High Ongar	
Epping Forest & Ongar	S. Gibbs	St James, Marden Ash	
Epping Forest & Ongar	S. Gibbs	All Saints, Norton Mandeville	
Epping Forest & Ongar	Vacant	St Mary the Virgin, Stapleford Tawney	
Epping Forest & Ongar	Vacant	St Mary the Virgin, Theydon Bois	
Epping Forest & Ongar	Vacant	All Saints, Theydon Garnon	
Epping Forest & Ongar	Vacant	St Michael, Theydon Mount	
Epping Forest & Ongar	C. Kosla P. Preston	St Mary, Chigwell	
Epping Forest & Ongar	C. Kosla P. Preston	All Saints, Chigwell Row	
Epping Forest & Ongar	C. Kosla P. Preston	St Winifred, Chigwell	
Epping Forest & Ongar	C. Kosla P. Preston	St Mary & All Saints, Lambourne	
Epping Forest & Ongar	C. Kosla P. Preston	St Mary the Virgin, Stapleford Abbotts	
Epping Forest & Ongar	P. Smith V. Yeadon	Holy Cross & St Lawrence, Waltham	
Epping Forest & Ongar	P. Smith V. Yeadon	Holy Innocents, High Beach	
Epping Forest & Ongar	P. Smith V. Yeadon	St Lawrence, Ninefields	
Epping Forest & Ongar	P. Smith V. Yeadon	St Thomas, Upshire	

== Sources ==
- Church of England Statistics 2002
