= Claybrook =

Claybrook may refer to:

== People ==
- Edwin Claybrook (1872–1931), American surgeon
- Elbert Pee Wee Claybrook (1912–1996), American jazz musician
- Joan Claybrook (born 1937), American lawyer and lobbyist
- John Claybrook (1872–1951), American businessman from Alabama
- William Claybrook (fl. 1600s), English priest

== Places ==
- Claybrook House, house in London, England
- Claybrook House (Kearney, Missouri), historic house in the United States

== Other ==
- Claybrook sign, medical phrase

== See also ==
- Claybrooke Magna, a village and civil parish in Leicestershire, England
- Claybrooke Parva, a village and civil parish in Leicestershire, England
- Claybrooks, a surname
