= Yeovil School =

Boys' grammar school in Somerset, 1845–1975

Yeovil School was a boys' grammar school in the Somerset town of Yeovil, in existence from 1845 to 1975.

The school was founded in 1845 by John Aldridge, at premises in Clarence Place, Yeovil. On 22 July 1851, Aldridge announced in the Sherborne Mercury that his school was about to re-open as "Kingston, Yeovil, Select Establishment for Young Gentlemen". It became known as Kingston School. For instruction in English and the classics, day boys paid eight guineas a year, boarders between 22 and 25 guineas, reduced for weekly boarders. For a small extra charge, French was taught by a native of Paris, and drawing and music by "eminent Professors". In addition, "the higher branches of Mathematics, &c." would be taught to those preparing for "the Sea, the Military, or other Public Colleges".

From about 1860 to 1906, the school was in competition for boys with the new Yeovil Grammar School of Henry Monk, which charged similar fees and also had a Frenchman to teach French.

In 1905, following the Education Act 1902, the school was enlarged and renamed Yeovil County School. In 1925 it was renamed again to Yeovil School.

In 1932, the school adopted rugby union as its main winter term sport, replacing soccer. In 1938 Yeovil School moved into new buildings in Mudford Road, Yeovil.

In 1948, there were three houses, Kingston, Ivel, and School. There was a school magazine, The Yeovilian, an Army Cadet Force, and an active Archaeological Society. This was led by the senior history master, L. C. Hayward, who later founded the Yeovil Archaeological and Local History Society.

In 1975, Somerset County Council was in the process of bringing in comprehensive schools, closing the county's selective grammar schools and the secondary modern schools which ran alongside them. Yeovil School, which by then was a grammar school for boys, together with Yeovil High School, the equivalent school for girls, and Summerleaze Secondary Modern School, were all closed. Two new schools were created, with effect from September 1975: Westfield Comprehensive School, which took in the children and many of the staff of the former Yeovil schools and was later renamed Westfield Academy; and a new Yeovil College, which took in the sixth form pupils of the old grammar schools. The college's science and business department were housed on the former Yeovil School site, providing some continuity.

== Former pupils ==
Those educated at the school are known as Old Yeovilians and include:

- David Banfield (1933–2014), Archdeacon of Bristol from 1990 to 1998
- Frank Bentley (born 1934), former Archdeacon of Worcester
- David Foot (1929-2021), writer, historian, and broadcaster
- Sir John Hannam (born 1929), former Conservative member of parliament for Exeter
- John Parish (born 1959), musician and record producer
- T. E. R. Phillips (1868–1942), astronomer, President from 1927 to 1929 of the Royal Astronomical Society
- Alfred Pippard (1891–1969), President of the Institution of Civil Engineers, and Professor of Civil Engineering at Imperial College London
- Edwin Seward (1853–1924), architect
