= William Swaddon =

William Swaddon may refer to:

- William Swaddon (politician), MP for Calne, 1604–1605
- William Swaddon (priest), his son, Archdeacon of Worcester, 1610–1623
