= Hugh Lloyd (disambiguation) =

Hugh Lloyd (1923–2008) was an English actor.

Hugh Lloyd may also refer to:

- Sir Hugh Pughe Lloyd (1894–1981), Royal Air Force commander
- Hugh Lloyd (bishop) (betw. 1586 and 1589 – 1667), Anglican bishop of Llandaff
- Hugh Lloyd (headmaster) (1546–1601), Welsh headmaster of Winchester College
- Hugh Lloyd (priest), 17th-century English priest
