= Roger Morris (bishop) =

Bishop of Colchester

The Right Reverend Roger Morris
- Bishop of Colchester
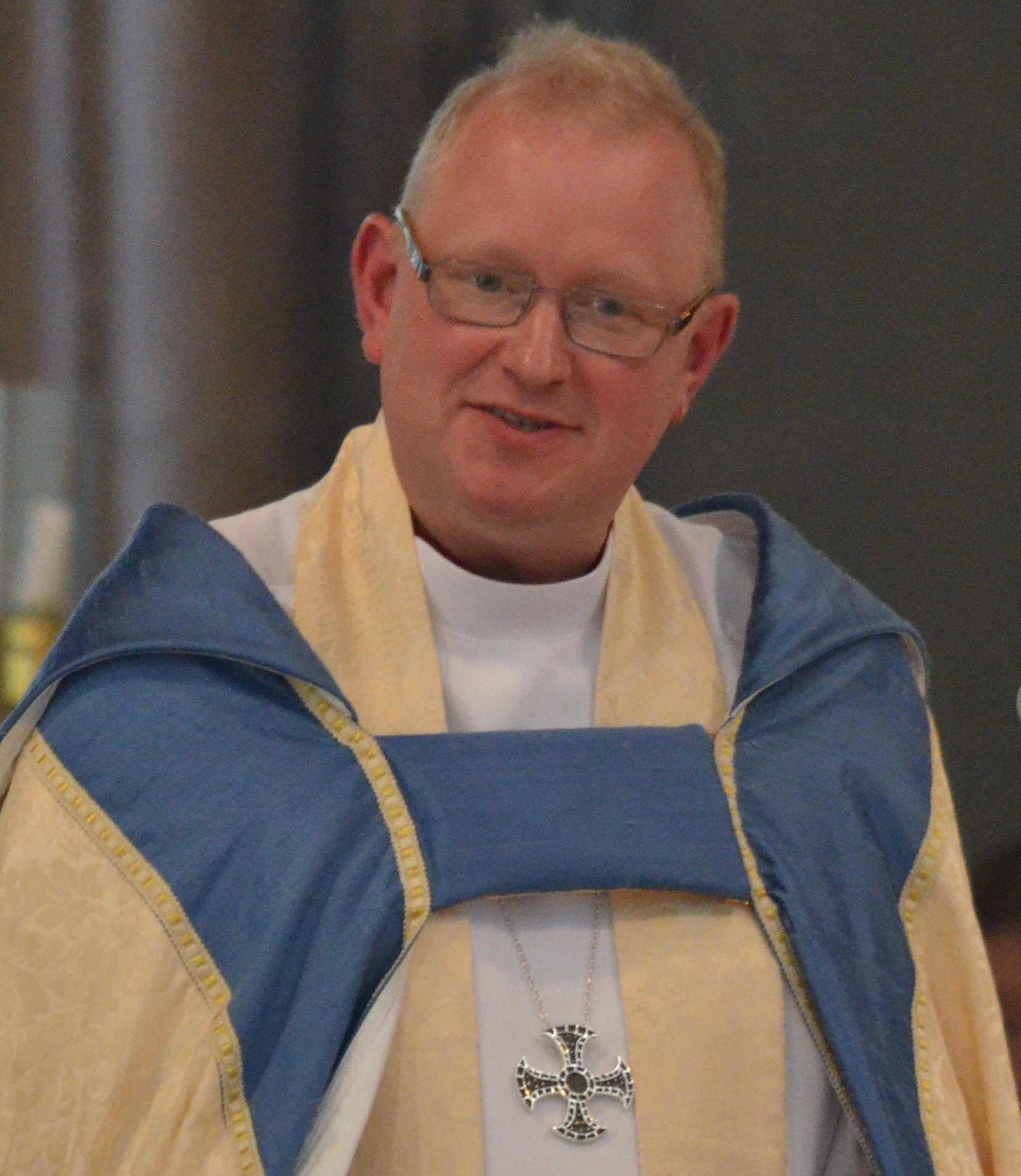
- Morris in 2014
- Church: Church of England
- Diocese: Diocese of Chelmsford
- In office: 25 July 2014–present
- Predecessor: Christopher Morgan
- Other post: Archdeacon of Worcester (2008–2014)

Orders
- Ordination: 1993 (deacon); 1994 (priest)
- Consecration: 25 July 2014

Personal details
- Born: 18 July 1968 (age 57)
- Denomination: Anglican
- Spouse: Sally
- Children: 2 daughters
- Education: Imperial College, London; Trinity College, Cambridge

Roger Anthony Brett Morris (born 18 July 1968) is the area Bishop of Colchester in the Church of England Diocese of Chelmsford. He was previously the Archdeacon of Worcester.

== Early life and education ==
Morris was born on 18 July 1968 in Hereford, Herefordshire, England. He was educated at Chipping Sodbury School and Filton Technical College. He studied at Imperial College, London, graduating with a Bachelor of Science (BSc) degree in 1989. From 1990 to 1993, he trained for ordination at Ridley Hall, Cambridge, an evangelical Anglican theological college. During this time, he also studied theology at Trinity College, Cambridge, graduating with a Bachelor of Arts (BA) degree in 1992: as per tradition, his BA was promoted to a Master of Arts (MA Cantab) degree in 2008.

== Ordained ministry ==
Morris was ordained in the Church of England as a deacon in 1993 and as a priest in 1994. After a curacy in Northleach he was the incumbent at Sevenhampton from 1996 to 2003; and then Director of Parish Development and Evangelism for the Diocese of Coventry from then until his archdeacon's appointment. From 2008 to 2014, he was Archdeacon of Worcester in the Diocese of Worcester.

On 2 May 2014, Morris was announced as the next Bishop of Colchester, a suffragan bishop in the Diocese of Chelmsford. He was consecrated as a bishop on 25 July 2014 at St Paul's Cathedral by Justin Welby, Archbishop of Canterbury.

=== Views ===
In 2023, he was one of 44 Church of England bishops who signed an open letter supporting the use of the Prayers of Love and Faith (i.e. blessings for same-sex couples) and called for "Guidance being issued without delay that includes the removal of all restrictions on clergy entering same-sex civil marriages, and on bishops ordaining and licensing such clergy".

== Personal life ==
Morris is married to Sally, a headteacher in a secondary school and a Minister in Secular Employment (MSE). They have two daughters. Morris stage-manages the Canopy Stage (previously The Performance Café) at the annual Greenbelt Christian Arts Festival. His interests include popular music, films, supporting Bristol Rovers and walking the family's two dogs.

Church of England titles
Preceded by Joy Tetley	Archdeacon of Worcester; 2008–2014	Succeeded by Robert Jones
Preceded by Christopher Morgan	Bishop of Colchester; 2014–present	Incumbent
