= Arthur Onslow (priest) =

Arthur Onslow (31 August 1746 – 15 October 1817) was Dean of Worcester from 1795 until his death.

The son of Lieutenant General Richard Onslow, he was educated at Eton and Exeter College, Oxford. He was ordained in 1774 and held incumbencies at St James Garlickhythe in the City of London, Shottesbrooke, Kidderminster, Wolverley and Lindridge. He married Frances Phipps in 1772. They had two daughters and three sons, one of whom, Richard, was Archdeacon of Worcester from 1815 to 1849.

Church of England titles
Preceded by St Andrew St John	Dean of Worcester; 1795–1817	Succeeded by John Jenkinson
