= Westfield Academy, Yeovil =

Westfield Academy

Location
- Stiby Road; Yeovil, Somerset, BA21 3EP; England; 50.9501°N 2.6512°W

Information
- Type: Academy
- Motto: Seeing the qualities in every child
- Established: 1975; 51 years ago
- Specialist: Science
- Department for Education URN: 137203 Tables
- Ofsted: Reports
- Head teacher: Simon Dallimore
- Staff: 120
- Gender: Mixed
- Age: 11 to 16
- Enrollment: 904
- Houses: Ventus, Aqua, Ignis, Terra
- Colours: Yellow, blue, red, green
- Website: www.westfieldacademy.co.uk

Westfield Academy (formerly known as Westfield School) is a secondary school in Yeovil, Somerset, England. The school has 904 students aged between 11 and 16 years. In August 2011, it became an academy.

== History ==
The school was created as a comprehensive school in 1975, following the decision of Somerset County Council to end selective grammar school education in the Yeovil area. The new school was launched with the pupils from the first to fifth forms of Yeovil High School, Yeovil School, and Summerleaze Secondary Modern School, while those in the high schools’ sixth forms were offered and mostly accepted places at the new Yeovil College. Westfield Comprehensive School took over the buildings of the former Yeovil High School for girls and the old Westfield Junior School, which had been located on opposite sides of a large playing field.

In 2010, the children of the Westfield Junior School and the Parcroft Primary School moved to the Summerleaze site of the new Oaklands Community Primary School. In the same year, the school announced plans to provide sports fields on the old Westfield Infants School, which was to be demolished.

In 2012, the School secured just under £60,000 of national lottery funding money to be used to update the tennis courts. These courts are now used by the students and outside sporting clubs.

== Academic performance and inspections ==
In the summer of 2011, the school announced its best ever GCSE exam results, with 79% of the school leavers achieving 5 GCSEs at grades A* to C. In addition, 56% of the students gained 5 GCSEs at grades A* to C, including English and Maths. These results were some of the highest in Yeovil at the time.

In 2023, the school was inspected by Ofsted and received a judgment of Good.

== Alumni ==
- Sam Weale, pentathlete
- Chris Weale, Footballer
