= William Lea (priest) =

William Lea (b Stone, Worcestershire 6 June 1820 - d Droitwich 24 September 1889) was Archdeacon of Worcester from 1881 to 1889.

Walters was educated at Brasenose College, Oxford, matriculating in 1839 and graduating B.A. in 1842, and was ordained in 1845. He was for many years the Vicar of St Peter, Droitwich.

Church of England titles
Preceded by Richard Hone	Archdeacon of Worcester; 1881–1889	Succeeded by William Walters
