= Richard Onslow (priest) =

Archdeacon of Worcester (1815–1849)

Richard Francis Onslow
- Born: 16 January 1776
- Died: 23 October 1849 (aged 73)
- Occupation: Archdeacon

Richard Francis Onslow (16 January 1776 – 23 October 1849) was Archdeacon of Worcester from 1815 to 1849.

Onslow was the son of Arthur Onslow, Dean of Worcester 1795–1817. He was educated at Christ Church, Oxford and ordained in 1800. He was Domestic Chaplain to the Bishop of Worcester; and then Vicar of Kidderminster until 1834. His final post was as Rector of Newent: in 1848, he fell ill and was "no longer able to preach".

His wife Harriet, the daughter of Andrew Foley, survived him and died in 1860; and his last surviving child, also called Harriet, died in 1879.

Church of England titles
Preceded by Thomas Evans	Archdeacon of Worcester; 1815–1849	Succeeded by Richard Hone
