= Thomas Powell (archdeacon of Worcester) =

English priest

Thomas Powell was a priest in England during the 16th century. Powell was educated at University of Oxford, eventually becoming Principal of New Inn Hall. After The Restoration he became an Honorary Chaplain to the King. He was Archdeacon of Worcester from 1563 until 1579.
