= Harold Gourley =

British civil engineer (1886–1956)

Harold John Frederick Gourley
- Born: 1886; Liverpool
- Died: 18 December 1956 (aged 69–70)
- Engineering career
- Discipline: Civil,
- Institutions: Institution of Civil Engineers (president)

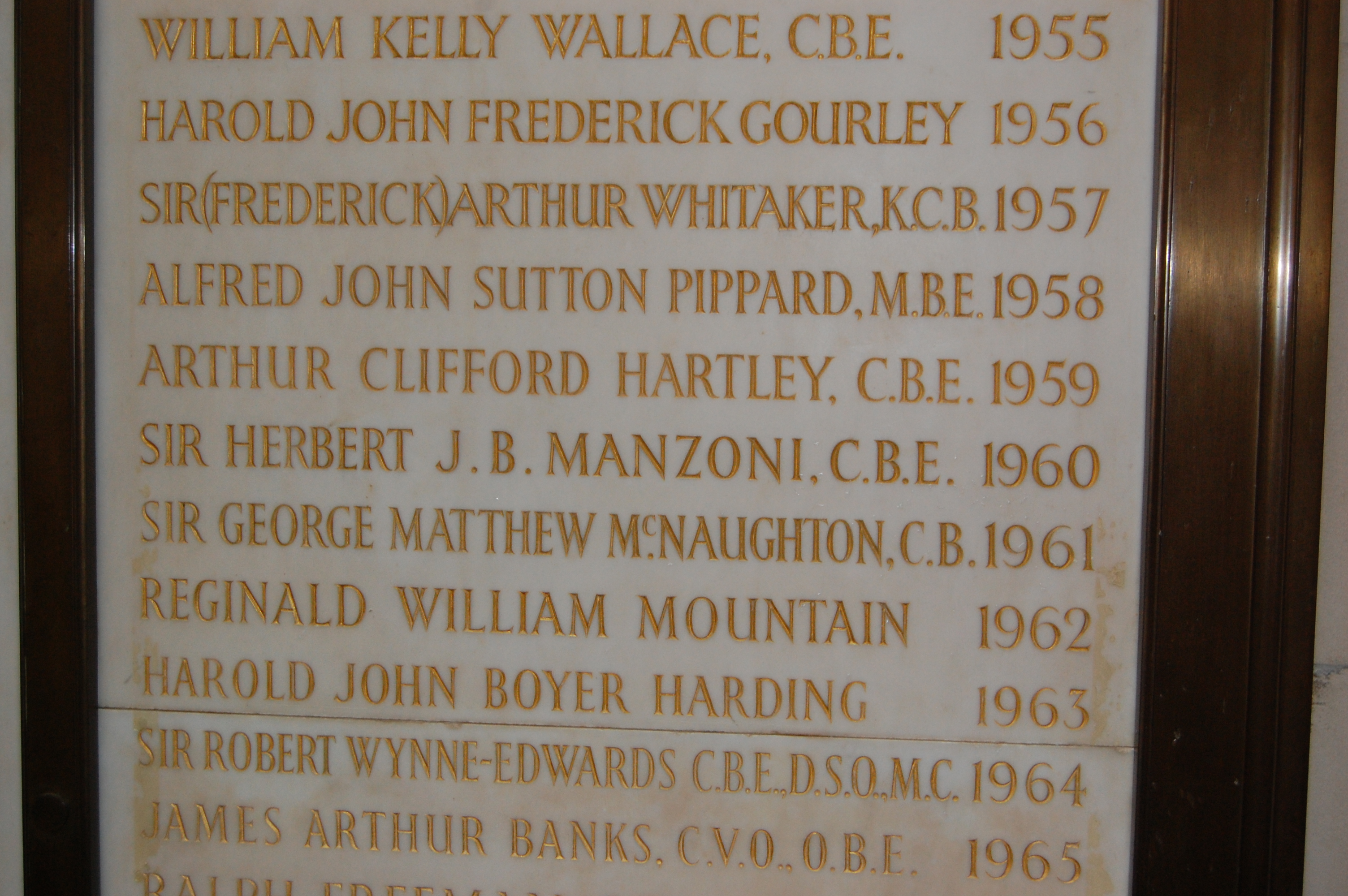
Gourley's name on the list of Institution of Civil Engineers presidents, at their One Great George Street headquarters

Harold John Frederick Gourley (1886–18 December 1956) was a British civil engineer.

Gourley was born in Liverpool in 1886. He was the holder of a Master of Engineering degree. On 5 October 1912 he gave a lecture to the Salford Technical and Engineering Association on reinforced concrete construction. He also submitted a paper for publication in the Proceedings of the Institution of Civil Engineers investigating the flow of water over circular weirs.

During the First World War Gourley served as a commissioned officer in the Corps of Royal Engineers of the British Army. By 1917 he was a Second Lieutenant in the Territorial Force (the army's volunteer reserve) and was also an Associate Member of the Institution of Civil Engineers. He was promoted to the rank of Lieutenant on 1 December 1917. Gourley was made Second-in-Command of a field company and on 8 July 1918 was given the acting rank of Captain whilst he held this command Gourley was promoted to acting Major on 24 January 1919, by which point he was serving in the Welsh Division. He reverted to his permanent rank of Lieutenant on 31 March 1919 on ceasing to be employed (due to the end of the war). After the war he continued to be liable to recall to the army as he belonged to the Reserve of Officers until he reached the age limit on 14 November 1936.

On 22 April 1938 Gourley was appointed a land tax commissioner for the City of Westminster and its Liberties. Before 1935 he wrote a paper for Engineering entitled "Great works of the Roman invaders". In 1945 he conducted a general survey of the water resources of Gloucestershire for the county planning office. On 28 January 1949 he was a main speaker at a discussion on river flow surveys and records at Burlington House which was chaired by Sir Roger Hetherington and covered in The Observatory. During this period he was described as a "well known consulting engineer".

On 21 September 1951 he was one of 35 people injured by the Weedon rail crash, the derailment of a passenger train on the West Coast Main Line near to Weedon Bec which killed 15 people. He was partially handicapped as a result and was awarded £47,720 damages by Mr Justice Pearce in the Queen's Bench Division in a judgment delivered on 1 April 1954, comprising £37,720 for loss of earnings, £9,000 for pain, suffering and loss of amenity, and £1,000 for out-of-pocket expenses. The damages awarded for loss of earnings were not subject to tax, but the amount awarded did not take account of the fact that the net earnings retained by Gourley - if he had not been injured - would have been reduced substantially by tax. An appeal against the damages was dismissed by the Court of Appeal, but the House of Lords reduced the damages for loss of earnings to £6,695, to take account of the hypothetical income tax and surtax that would have been due on the actual earnings, setting a legal precedent known as the Gourley principle that remains important in English law.

Gourley became president of the Institution of Civil Engineers (ICE) in November 1956. He died just six weeks into his term on 18 December 1956, becoming the first elected president to die whilst in office (Thomas Telford, who was president-for-life, had previously died in office). As the ICE council was empowered to fill any vacancy except that of president a Special General Meeting was called. During this meeting Sir Frederick Arthur Whitaker was elected as president to take effect from February. Whitaker served the remainder of Gourley's term in addition to the full 1957-58 term. A portrait of Gourley hangs in the collection of the National Portrait Gallery in London.

Professional and academic associations
Preceded by William Kelly Wallace	President of the Institution of Civil Engineers; November 1956 – January 1957	Succeeded by Frederick Arthur Whitaker
