= Thomas Evans (archdeacon of Worcester) =

British churchman (died 1815)

Thomas Evans (died 12 August 1815) was a British churchman, Archdeacon of Worcester from 1787. He left a travel diary, covering journeys in the period 1755–1759.

Church of England titles
Preceded by John Warren	Archdeacon of Worcester; 1787–1815	Succeeded by Richard Onslow
