= Edward Holland (bishop) =

British Anglican bishop (born 1936)

The Right Reverend Edward Holland
- Bishop of Colchester
- Diocese: Diocese of Chelmsford
- In office: 1995–2001
- Predecessor: Michael Vickers
- Successor: Christopher Morgan
- Other posts: Honorary assistant bishop in London and in Europe (2002–present); Suffragan Bishop in Europe (1986–1995)

Orders
- Ordination: 1965 (deacon); 1966 (priest)
- Consecration: 22 July 1986

Personal details
- Born: 28 June 1936 (age 90)
- Denomination: Anglican
- Parents: Reginald Holland & Olive Yeoman
- Education: King's College London

Edward Holland (born 28 June 1936) is a retired Anglican bishop, who was the Suffragan Bishop in Europe and then the area Bishop of Colchester. He is now an honorary assistant bishop in both the Diocese of London and the Diocese in Europe.

== Early life ==
Holland was born on 28 June 1936, educated at Dauntsey's School, and trained for the priesthood at King's College London, becoming an Associate of King's College (AKC).

== Ordained ministry ==
Holland was ordained a deacon in 1965 and a priest in 1966. His first ministry position after ordination was as a curate at Holy Trinity Church, Dartford. He then served at John Keble Church, Mill Hill. before a period in the Mediterranean.

Holland was precentor at Gibraltar Cathedral and then chaplain of Christ Church, Naples. He returned to London to be vicar of St. Mark's, Bromley, before his ordination to the episcopate.

=== Episcopal ministry ===
Holland was consecrated as a bishop on 22 July 1986, by Robert Runcie, Archbishop of Canterbury, at Southwark Cathedral. His first episcopal appointment made use of his experience as the suffragan bishop ("Suffragan Bishop in Europe") of the Diocese in Europe, a diocese often described simply as "in Europe". The suffragan bishop in Europe assists the diocesan bishop. Holland served in this ministry for nine years.

Holland returned to the United Kingdom in 1995, to the Diocese of Chelmsford, as Bishop of Colchester. That see is also one of a suffragan bishop, but this diocese is one in which the see is divided into discrete areas of administration (since 1983), so the bishop is more often referred to as an area bishop. He retired from full-time ministry in 2001.

In retirement, Holland has been an honorary assistant bishop in the Diocese in Europe since 2002 and also in the Diocese of London between 2002 and 2023.

=== Views ===
In February 2012, Holland signed an open letter calling for the Church of England to allow its priests to officiate at civil partnership ceremonies in their churches if their conscience allows them to. It was suggested that this would work in the same way as the remarriage of divorced couples, in that no priest would be forced to do so if their conscience did not allow it.

Church of England titles
| Preceded by Ambrose Weekes | Suffragan Bishop in Europe; 1986–1995 | Succeeded by Henry Scriven |
| Preceded by Michael Vickers | Bishop of Colchester; 1995–2001 | Succeeded by Christopher Morgan |
