= Yeovil Grammar School =

Boys' grammar school in Somerset, 1860–1906

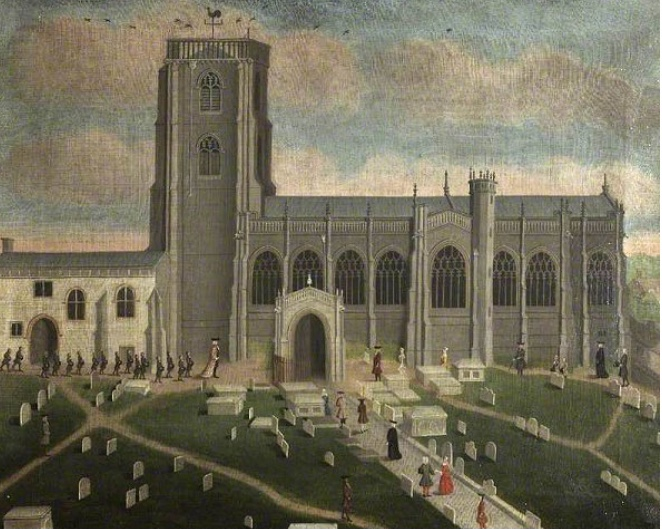
St John’s Church, Yeovil, with Chantry attached, showing schoolmaster and boys, c. 1750

Yeovil Grammar School was a grammar school in Yeovil, Somerset, which was founded or refounded about 1860 and closed in 1906 when its only headmaster, Henry Monk, retired.

The 19th-century grammar school grew out of a long-established charity school, which according to some sources was itself a grammar school when founded in 1573 and was referred to by that name in 1839 and 1853.

== First school ==
From the 16th century to the 19th century, a charity school provided a free elementary education in Yeovil for sons of the poor, funded by local charitable bequests, including the income from about 25 acres of land. Beginning in the 18th century, there were also ten places available for boys from nearby parishes, paid for by the Nowes Foundation, a charity established for the purpose of educating local boys and setting them up in trades.

For centuries, the school occupied a building called the Chantry, a chapel in the churchyard of the parish church of St John the Baptist, which was attached to the church tower. This was fitted out as a schoolroom by the parish in 1573. The full name of the building was the Chantry Chapel of St Mary the Virgin without the Church. It probably dated from the early fourteenth century, and may have formed part of an earlier church on the site. Some sources say that the school was established in the 16th century as a grammar school.

In the early 19th century, litigation was begun in the Court of Chancery, due to the charity school having decayed and those entrusted with its investments not paying what was due on them. In 1819, the School Commissioners investigated the affairs of the school.

In September 1839, the Rev. John Langdon was appointed as schoolmaster, when the school was reported to be called "Yeovil Free Grammar School". By December of that year, Langdon was advertising for young gentlemen to be taken as private grammar school pupils. In July 1853, Langdon was described as "curate of Barwick and Head Master of Yeovil Grammar School" when the Dean and Chapter of Wells Cathedral nominated him as vicar of Mudford, some three miles from Yeovil.

In 1855, the old Chantry was demolished, in order to make more space in the churchyard for burials, and was rebuilt (or replaced by a new building of similar size and appearance) next to the churchyard. This cost £1,200 and incorporated some features of the original building, including two chimneypieces and three niches. The doorway and all the windows were built from newly cut stone. There were feoffees of the new Chantry, who appointed the schoolmaster.

In May 1859, Henry Monk, then aged twenty-four and of Harrow Weald, was appointed as schoolmaster of the Yeovil Charity School, replacing the Rev. John Langdon, who had resigned. The Western Flying Post noted that "There were several candidates for the position." Monk’s salary was £93 a year, with permission to take private pupils, the purpose of this being to encourage a better class of schoolmaster.

== Two schools ==
In January 1860, Monk married Elizabeth Henrietta Hawkins (who was 'Superannuated from the War Department') at All Saints Church, Harrow Weald. At first they lived on the Sherborne Road, Yeovil, but in the 1860s they moved to a house in Hendford Hill, which acted as a boarding house for boys. These were the first pupils of a new school which was advertised as Yeovil Grammar School.

In 1864, there were two schoolrooms in the Chantry. One was used to teach thirty-four boys, the sons of working-class fathers; of these, ten were on the Nowes Foundation and received two suits of clothing a year and £5 towards buying an apprenticeship when they left the school at the age of about thirteen. The second room at the Chantry was used by the boys of the new grammar school, of whom there were nine day boys and another twenty boarders, who lived with the Monks. During the 1870s, Monk acquired a larger house, in Hendford, now called Flowers House.

In 1873, Monk was advertising the "Grammar School, Yeovil", as a public school "founded about 1573". He then had three assistant schoolmasters, one of whom taught French, and the school fees were between six and eight guineas a year for day boys, between 25 and 30 guineas for boarders.

By the 1870s, the Endowed Schools Commissioners did not like Monk combining what they considered to be a private grammar school for middle-class boys with a primary school; they wanted to create instead a public grammar school. However, beneficiaries of the educational charity at Preston, Alvington, and Brympton were against the loss of the clothing and apprenticeship payments, to which they were entitled under the 18th-century Will of Dr John Nowes. In 1877 the Charity Commissioners decided that in any event they had no powers under the Endowed Schools Act 1869 to promote the plan.

In 1879, the Nowes foundation stopped paying Monk its share of his salary, but the charity school continued to operate at the Chantry, as did Monk’s own school, which also used his home and boarding house in Hendford. The income from the Nowes endowments was at first conserved, pending the way forward for that charity being found.

== One school ==
The charity school closed in 1884, and Monk continued to use the Chantry as a schoolroom until 1889, paying rent for it. In January 1886, Monk’s son F. E. Monk was acting as Assistant Master of the grammar school and was said to be a member of the University of London. A public notice of the beginning of the school term stated "Pupils prepared for public schools, local examinations, or commercial life. There is a Preparatory Class for younger boys."

After 1889, for several years the Chantry was used for Roman Catholic Church services, one of the meeting places they occupied before the new Church of the Holy Ghost was consecrated in Higher Kingston. The Yeovil School Board then occupied the Chantry for two years.

A boy who attended Monk’s school in the 1890s later recalled being taught to read by Mrs Monk, at a time when there were some fifty or sixty boys in the school. Classes were taught by Monk, his daughter, and his son-in-law. In 1897, the house in Hendford was put up for auction and described as a three-storey, ten-bedroom house, with a schoolroom which could be converted into a coach house, and a walled garden. After the sale of his own school building, Monk took the Chantry again for teaching in, but after the school returned to the Chantry, the numbers fell to only about a dozen boys. Teaching went on at the Chantry until Monk retired in 1906. After that, his school came to an end.

== Masters of the charity school ==
- 1711: Mr Hibberd
- 1754–1803: John Boucher Hodges, died 1806
- 1804: Rev. Thomas Tomkins
- 1839–1859: Rev. John Langdon
- 1859–1884: Henry Monk

== Notable former pupils ==
- T. E. R. Phillips (1868–1942), clergyman and astronomer
- Sir Ernest Petter (1873–1954), engineer

== Aftermath ==
Monk retired to Ryme Intrinseca. After the death of his wife in 1911, he moved to Stratton-on-the-Fosse, where he died in 1921.

After 1906, the Chantry was used for various educational purposes, while the income from the charity school endowments was applied to offering free places at Yeovil School and the High School for girls. Since 1945, when secondary education became publicly funded, the trustees have made grants for higher education. As of 1987, the Chantry was in use as a store-room for legal documents. In 2017 it was used by a firm of solicitors as a meeting room and by then was a Grade II listed building.
