= Chipping Sodbury School =

Academy in South Gloucestershire, England

Location
- Bowling Road; Chipping Sodbury, South Gloucestershire, BS37 6EW; England
- Coordinates: 51.5341°N 2.3950°W

Information
- Type: Academy
- Motto: Temere non Judicandum
- Local authority: South Gloucestershire
- Department for Education URN: 148295 Tables
- Ofsted: Reports
- Headteacher: Rob Skipp
- Gender: Coeducational
- Age: 11 to 18
- Website: http://www.chippingsodburyschool.com/

Chipping Sodbury School is a coeducational secondary school and sixth form, located in Chipping Sodbury in the Unitary authority of South Gloucestershire, England. It shares ground with the Cotswold Edge sixth-form.

Chipping Sodbury School was previously administered by South Gloucestershire Council and the Chipping Sodbury School Co-operative Trust as a foundation school. In April 2021 the school converted to academy status and is now part of The Athelstan Trust.

The school has been on its present site since 1938, when Chipping Sodbury Grammar School moved there. It became a comprehensive school in 1970. Chipping Sodbury Grammar School had been established in 1913, in what is now the building called the Old Grammar School and Chipping Sodbury Library. This building has since been owned by Chipping Sodbury Town Hall and the Townlands Charity.

Before converting into an academy, the school had been given 'requires improvement' ratings by the educational review body Ofsted at inspections in December 2013, December 2015 and June 2018.

Chipping Sodbury School offers GCSEs, BTECs and OCR Nationals as programmes of study for pupils, while students in the sixth form have the option to study from a range of A Levels and further BTECs. The sixth form provision of the school is offered in conjunction with Brimsham Green School in Yate.

As of 2018, the school had 772 pupils.

== Notable former pupils ==
- Roger Morris, Bishop of Colchester
- Dan Norris, Member of Parliament
