= John Brancastre =

English churchman and administrator

John Brancastre or John de Bramcastre (died 1218) was an English churchman and administrator, who became archdeacon of Worcester.

== Life ==
He was included among the keepers of the great seal by Thomas Duffus Hardy, under the dates of 1203 and 1205; but Edward Foss gave reasons for believing that the subscriptions to charters supposed to be attached by him as keeper were only affixed in the capacity of a deputy, or a clerk in the exchequer or in the chancery.

Brancastre's signature is found attesting documents from 1200 to 1208. In 1200 or the following year he was made archdeacon of Worcester; in November 1204 he was sent to Flanders on the king's service; and on 13 January 1207 was commissioned by King John to take charge of Ramsey Abbey during a vacancy in the abbacy, and in his capacity of administrator paid thence, in May of the same year, £97 into the exchequer. In the following October he was rewarded by the king (who exercised the right of presentation during the vacancy in the abbacy) with the vicarage of the parish which was doubtless his birthplace, Brancaster in Norfolk, and on 29 May 1208 was appointed prebendary of Lidington in Lincoln Cathedral. He died in 1218.
