= Christopher Morgan (bishop) =

The Right Reverend Christopher Morgan
- area Bishop of Colchester
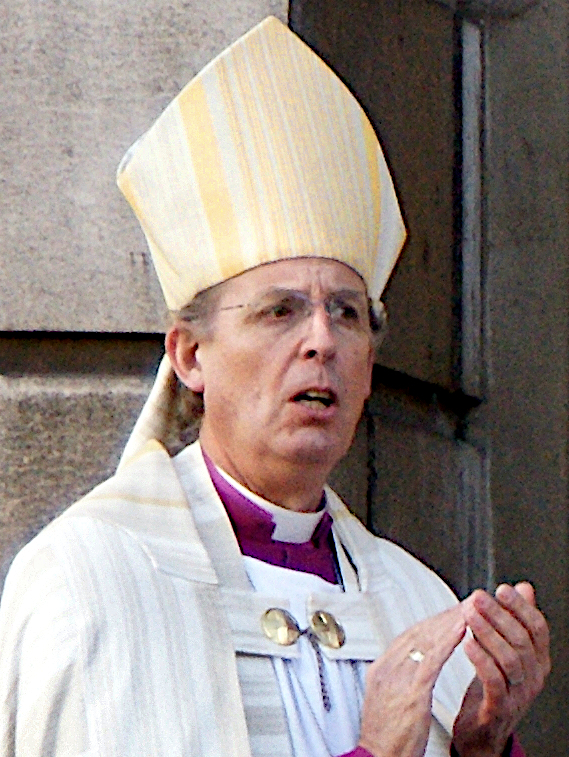
- Bishop Morgan in 2010
- Diocese: Diocese of Chelmsford
- In office: 2001–July 2013 (retirement)
- Predecessor: Edward Holland
- Successor: Roger Morris
- Other posts: Canon Residentiary, Gloucester Cathedral (1996–2001)

Orders
- Ordination: 1973 (deacon); 1974 (priest)
- Consecration: 6 December 2001

Personal details
- Born: 23 March 1947 (age 79)
- Denomination: Anglican
- Spouse: Anne Musgrave
- Children: 1 adult son; 1 adult daughter
- Education: Lancaster University

Christopher Heudebourck Morgan (born 23 March 1947) is a retired bishop in the Church of England, the area Bishop of Colchester from 2002 until his retirement in 2013.

Morgan was educated at the City of Bath Boys School and Lancaster University. He is a Master of Theology, Bachelor of Arts and has a Diploma in Theology. He studied for ordination at Kelham Theological College.

Morgan was made a deacon at Michaelmas 1973 (23 September) and ordained a priest the Michaelmas following (22 September 1974), both times by Ronald Williams, Bishop of Leicester, at Leicester Cathedral. He was a curate at St James the Great, Birstall and then a chaplain in Brussels, Vicar of St George's Redditch and then Sonning. From 1985 to 1996 he was the Diocese of Gloucester's Diocesan Officer for Ministry and then a residentiary canon at Gloucester Cathedral until his ordination to the episcopate.

He was consecrated a bishop on 6 December 2001 by George Carey, Archbishop of Canterbury, at Westminster Abbey and installed at Chelmsford Cathedral on 3 February 2002.

A keen hill walker, he is married to Anne and has two children.

== Styles ==
- The Reverend Christopher Morgan (1973–1996)
- The Reverend Canon Christopher Morgan (1996–2001)
- The Right Reverend Christopher Morgan (2001–present)

Church of England titles
Preceded by Edward Holland	Bishop of Colchester; 2001–2013	Succeeded by Roger Morris
