= Edward Thornborough (priest) =

English priest (1587–1645)

Edward Thornborough, DD (b Middlesex 1587; d Worcester 1645) was a 17th-century English priest.

The son of Bishop John Thornborough, he was educated at Merton College, Oxford. Thornborough held livings at Witchampton, Ower Moigne and Turnerspuddle; and was archdeacon of Worcester from 1629 until his death.
