= Robert Whitcombe =

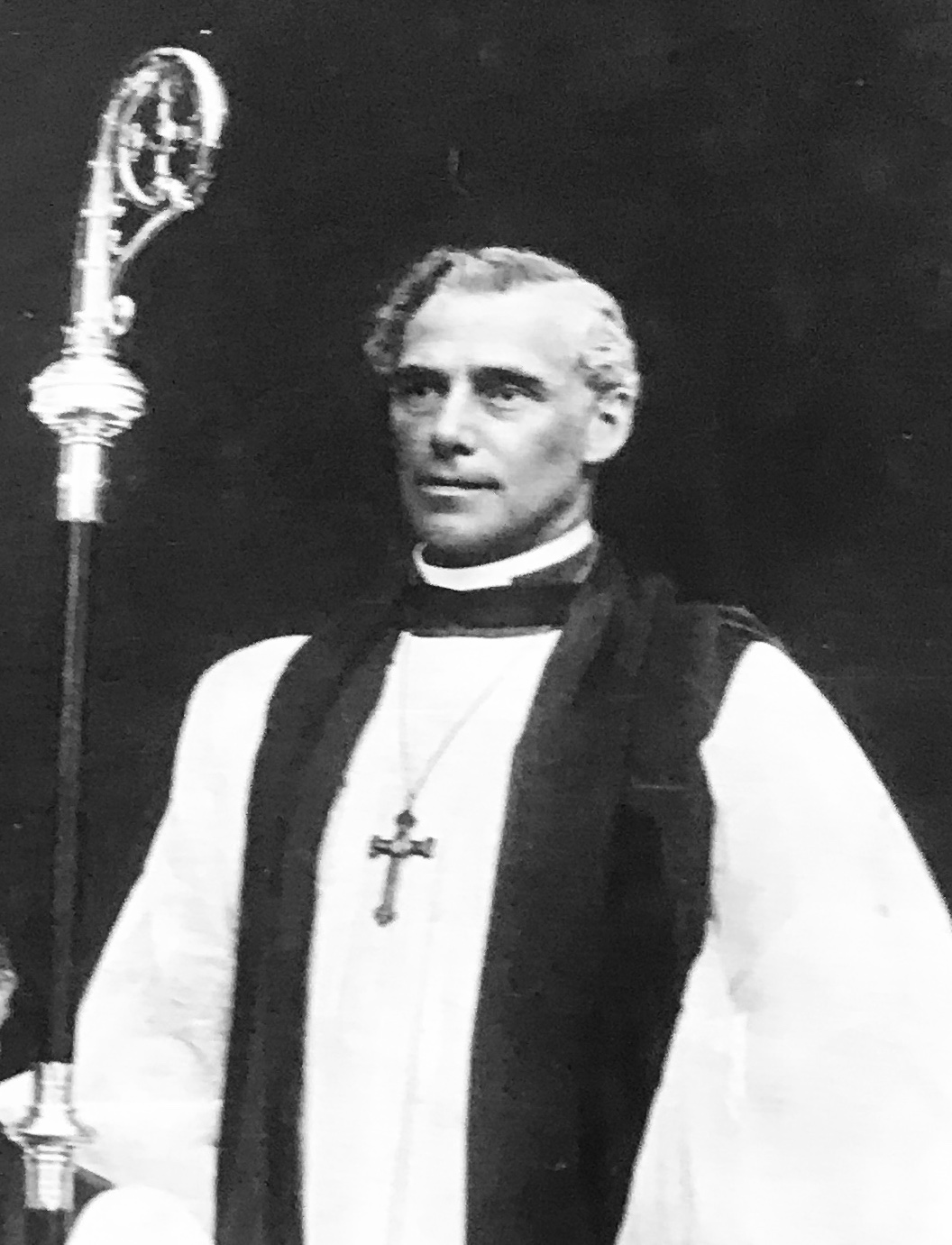
Robert Whitcombe c1914

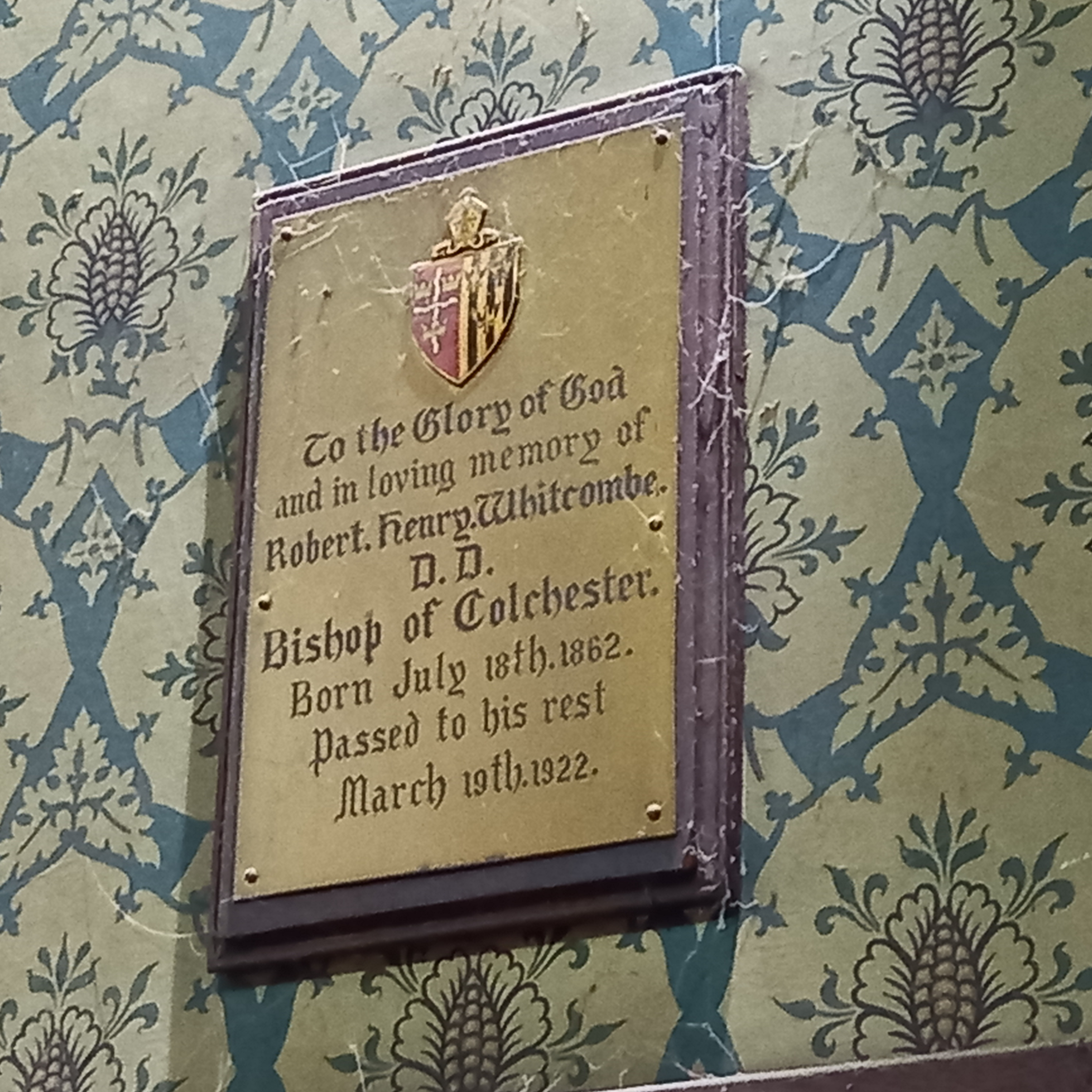
Mural monument plaque in the former St Mary-at-the-Walls Church, Colchester, now an arts centre.

The Rev Robert Henry Whitcombe (18 July 1862–19 March 1922) was an eminent Anglican Bishop. Educated at Winchester and New College, Oxford, from 1886 to 1899 he was a schoolmaster at Wellington College and then Eton. After this he was Rector of Hardwick, Buckinghamshire and then Vicar of Romford before a 13-year spell as Bishop of Colchester from 1909. A memorial window and plaque to him is situated on the south wall of St Mary-at-the-Walls, Colchester.

== Notes ==
Church of England titles
Preceded by Henry Frank Johnson	Bishop of Colchester; 1909–22	Succeeded by Thomas Alfred Chapman
