= Herbert Reeve =

Herbert Reeve (28 May 1868 – 24 February 1956) was a Church of England clergyman and missionary with benefices in New Zealand. He was Archdeacon of Waitara before returning to England.

== Early life ==
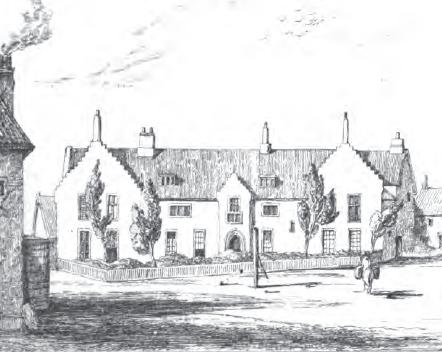
Holt Grammar School

A son of Dr Edmund Reeve, surgeon, of Reepham, Norfolk, by his marriage to Kate Sewell, Reeve was born at Swaffham, Norfolk, in 1868 and educated at Holt Grammar School.

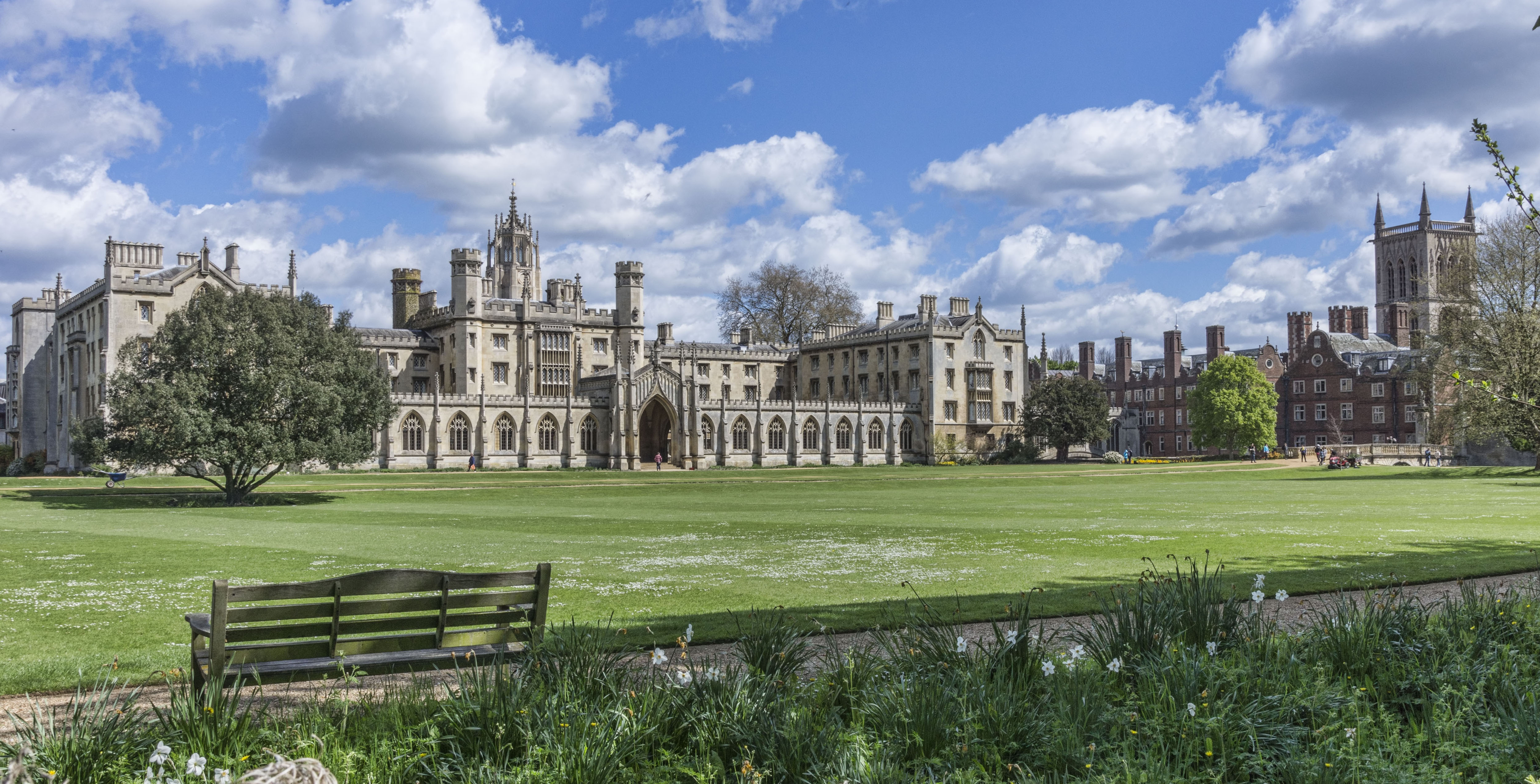
St John’s College, Cambridge

He proceeded to St John's College, Cambridge, where he was admitted in July 1893 and matriculated in the Michaelmas term of the same year. He graduated BA in 1896 and was promoted to MA in 1901. While at Cambridge, he played rugby union for his college.

Reeve had two brothers, Charles Ernest and Arthur, the latter also a clergyman of the Church of England.

== Career ==
In 1896 Reeve was ordained a deacon and in 1897 a priest. In 1896 he became Curate at St Matthew's, Newington, Surrey, transferring as Curate to Croydon in 1899. In 1903 he resigned his junior post there to migrate to New Zealand and take up the role of Vicar of Inglewood, where he remained until 1907. For a year he was a missionary priest of the diocese of Auckland, serving the district of East Taranaki, then from 1908 to 1911 was Vicar of the Holy Sepulchre parish, Auckland, and from 1911 to 1924 Vicar of Wanganui. He was also Archdeacon of Waitotara from 1915 to 1924. He then returned home to Norfolk, where he was Rector of Brancaster from 1924 to 1945 and Rural Dean of Heacham from 1933 to 1945.

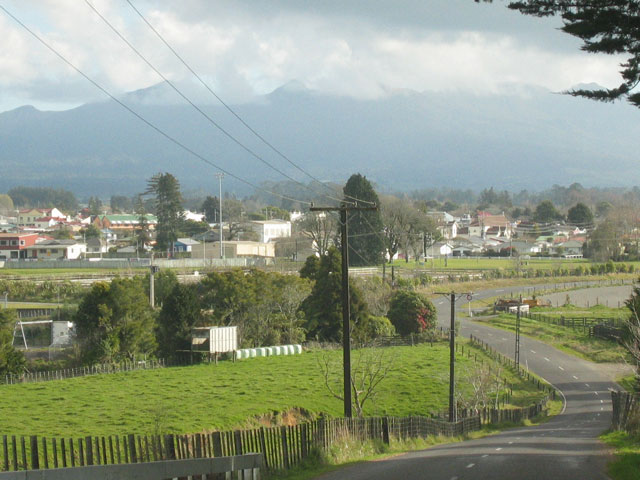
Inglewood, in the shadow of Mount Taranaki, on North Island, New Zealand

While in New Zealand, Reeve married Nora Trischler Merton, the elder daughter of George Henry Merton, head master of the Cathedral School of Christchurch.

Reeve died in February 1956, when he was living at 60 Queen's Gate, Kensington. He left a widow, Nora Trischler Reeve, and an estate valued at £2,209. Mrs Reeve died in 1960.
