= Frederick Arthur Whitaker =

British civil engineer (1893–1968)

Sir Frederick Whitaker
- Born: Frederick Arthur Whitaker; 17 July 1893; Ladysmith, Natal Colony
- Died: 13 June 1968 (aged 74)
- Education: University of Liverpool
- Engineering career
- Discipline: Civil,
- Institutions: Institution of Civil Engineers (president)

Sir Frederick Arthur Whitaker KCB (17 July 1893 – 13 June 1968) was a British civil engineer. Although born in the Colony of Natal, he was educated in Liverpool and received a Master of Engineering degree from the University of Liverpool. Whitaker joined the Civil Engineer in Chief's Department of the Admiralty at the age of 22 and spent much of the rest of his career there. His earlier work included Royal Navy bases in the United Kingdom, Jamaica, Malta and Singapore during the First World War and Interwar period. In 1934 he became Deputy Civil Engineer-In-Chief to the Admiralty, being promoted to Civil Engineer-In-Chief in 1940. Whitaker held that position for 14 years, which included most of the Second World War, and during that time was ultimately responsible for all of the Admiralty's civil engineering projects. He retired from the Admiralty in 1954, becoming a partner for an engineering consultancy.

Whitaker was appointed a Companion of the Order of the Bath in 1941, and became a Knight Commander in 1945. He was also appointed a Commander in the Legion of Honour by the French government in 1947. He was an active member of the Institution of Civil Engineers, which he had joined in 1919, and held various offices for them. He was elected president of the institution at a Special General Meeting in February 1957, following the death of the previous president, Harold Gourley. Whitaker sat on various committees of organisations related to his area of expertise, including the Dover Harbour Board and Suez Canal Company. He was also awarded an honorary doctorate by the University of Liverpool in 1960.

== Early life ==
Whitaker was born on 17 July 1893 in Ladysmith, Natal Colony in modern-day South Africa but received his education mainly in Liverpool in the United Kingdom. He attended Liverpool Institute High School for Boys and studied engineering at the University of Liverpool where he received a first class honours Bachelor of Science degree in 1914 and a Master of Engineering degree in 1917. Whitaker undertook two years of training with a Mr. H Cartwright before he joining the Admiralty's Civil Engineer in Chief's Department at the age of 22.

== Admiralty work ==
At the Admiralty Whitaker focussed on the construction and maintenance of harbours, docks, air defence installations and fuel oil facilities. Two of his earlier projects were the construction of Rosyth Naval Base and Port Edgar destroyer base. In 1919 he began a two-year project to erect oil tanks in Jamaica and was later instructed to design and build a pier and moorings for cruisers. In the same year Whitaker was elected a corporate member of the Institution of Civil Engineers (ICE).

On 8 June 1921 Whitaker was appointed Assistant Civil Engineer for the Devonport Dockyard. In 1926 he was posted to the Royal Navy dockyard in Malta where he was involved in the construction of a wave trap in the harbour and underground ammunition dumps as well as the maintenance of various breakwaters. He returned to the UK in 1929 when he took up a position as a civil engineer to the Portsmouth dockyard, where he was involved with the reconstruction of a seawall and jetty. Whitaker was promoted to Superintending Civil Engineer of the naval base at Singapore in 1933, whilst there he constructed a 1,000 feet (300 m) long dry dock and undertook reclamation works on swampy land. The next year he was promoted once more, becoming Deputy Civil Engineer-In-Chief to the Admiralty, and in 1940 was appointed as Civil Engineer-In-Chief. Whitaker held that office for the next 14 years, which gave him responsibility for all Admiralty civil engineering projects across the Empire and encompassed the busy years of the Second World War.

Whitaker had been elected to the senior grade of ICE membership in 1938, and he became a member of the council in 1944 and became vice-president in 1953. He was rewarded for his work at the Admiralty with an appointment as a Companion of the Order of the Bath on 12 June 1941. On 1 January 1945 he was promoted to the rank of Knight Commander in that Order, which entitled him to use the prefix "Sir". Whitaker was also rewarded by the French government for his work during the war, being appointed a Commander in the Legion of Honour in 1947.

== Later life ==
Whitaker left the Admiralty in 1954 and joined the Livesey & Henderson engineering consultancy as a partner – his curriculum vitae for this job is now held in the National Archives. He retired from the company in 1962 but continued to work for them as a consultant. During this time he served as chairman of the British National Committee of the Permanent International Association of Navigation Congresses; from 1952 he sat on the Commission Consultative Internationale des Travaux of the Suez Canal Company; and for 14 years he served as a member of the Dover Harbour Board.

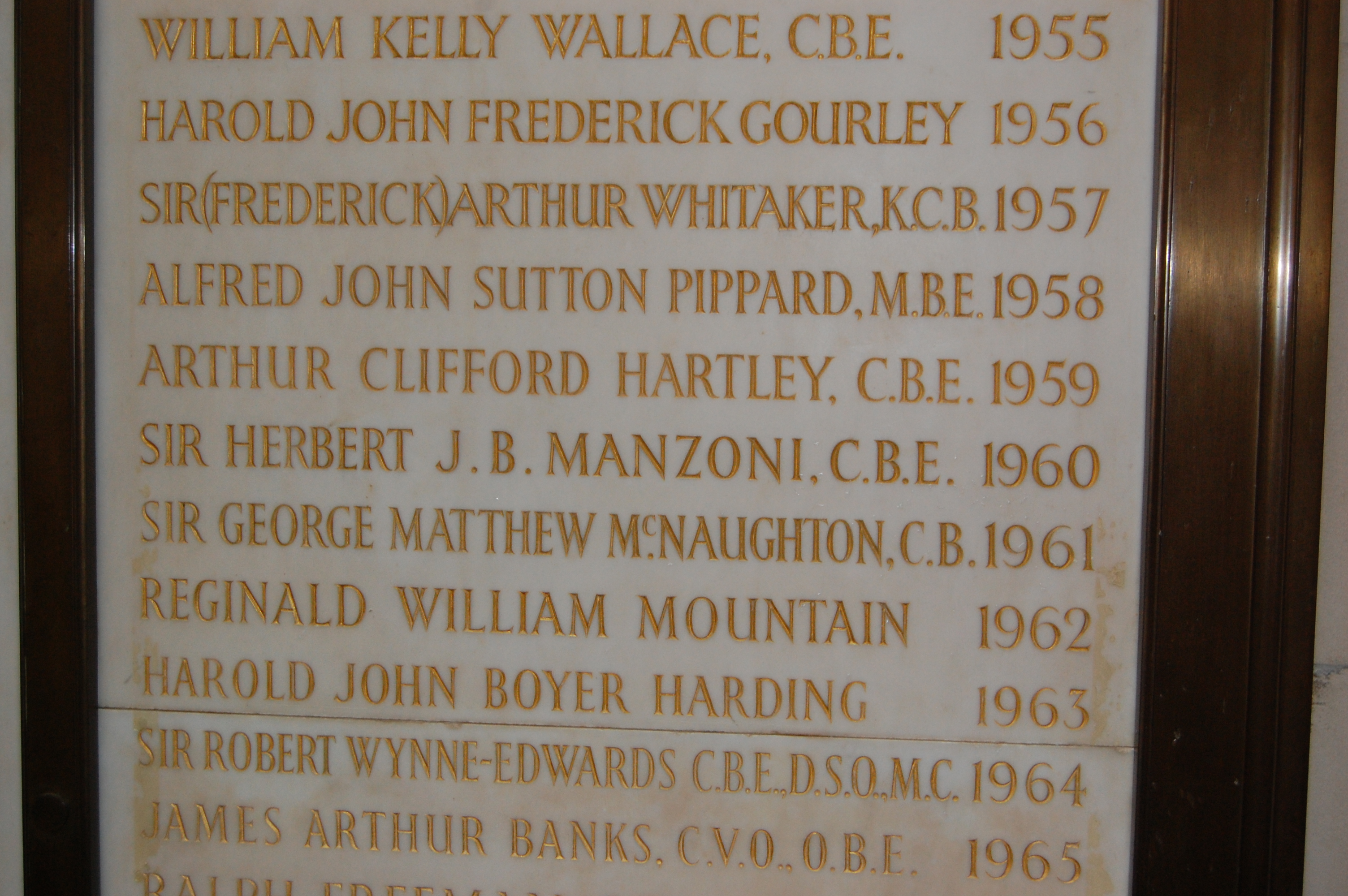
Whitaker's name on the list of Institution of Civil Engineers presidents, at their One Great George Street headquarters

In 1956 Whitaker was elected to the management commitment of the ICE's Benevolent Fund, a charitable fund that provides for members in hardship, and the next year was elected chairman. On 18 December 1956 Harold Gourley, then President of the ICE, died just six weeks after assuming the office in November. Gourley was the first regularly elected president to die in office (Thomas Telford, who was elected president for life, had previously died in office) and the ICE council, who were authorised to fill any vacancy except that of President, were forced to call a Special General Meeting of members. As a result of this meeting, Whitaker was elected to the position in February 1957 and was allowed to serve out the remainder of Gourley's term in addition to his own full term.

In 1960 the University of Liverpool awarded Whitaker an honorary doctorate in engineering. Whitaker was married and had a son and two daughters. He died on 13 June 1968.

Professional and academic associations
Preceded by Harold Gourley	President of the Institution of Civil Engineers; February 1957 – November 1958	Succeeded by Alfred Pippard
