= Royal West Norfolk Golf Club =

Golf club in Norfolk, England

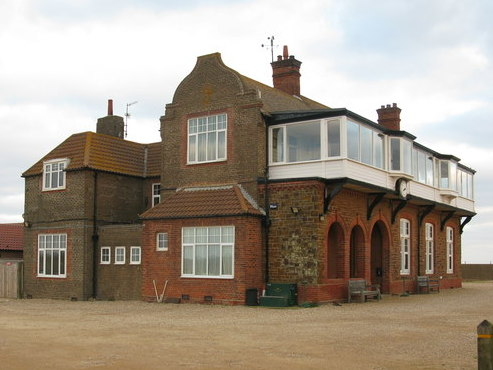
- The clubhouse

- Location in Norfolk
- 52°58′27″N 0°38′8″E

Club information
- Location: Brancaster, Norfolk, England
- Established: 1892
- Type: Links
- Tota holes: 18
- Website: https://www.rwngc.org/

Royal West Norfolk Golf Club is a golf club in Brancaster, Norfolk, England, about 7 miles (11 km) east of Hunstanton, between Brancaster Bay and the salt marshes. The links course opened in 1892. Andrew Collison is the professional at the club. The "Royal" club name is named after Edward VII, who was the Prince of Wales at the time of opening.

There are significant environmental issues involved with managing the club and surrounding marshes. Brancaster West Marshes are a Site of Special Scientific Interest and a Special Protection Area under the European Union Birds Directive, because they provide an important habitat for birds. Due to sea level rise, efforts to mitigate coastal erosion are in place in the area. Earth flood embankments were built nearby in 1978 to protect again storm surges, and there has also been the need for the course to implement defensive measures of its own.

The original course was laid out by Horace Hutchinson, but due to the fragility of the marshland and coast, it had undergone many changes over the past century, and there are now two crossings between holes 2 and 17 and 4 and 5. At times of high tide the course can become an island, thereby rendering parts of the layout inaccessible.

== See also ==
- List of golf clubs granted Royal status
