= William Swaddon (politician) =

William Swaddon was Member of Parliament for Calne from 1604 to 1605 when he asked to resign owing to ill health. He was a clothier by trade. His son, also William, was Archdeacon of Worcester from 1610 to 1623.
