= Brancaster =

Village in Norfolk, England

Coordinates: 52.962°N 0.641°E

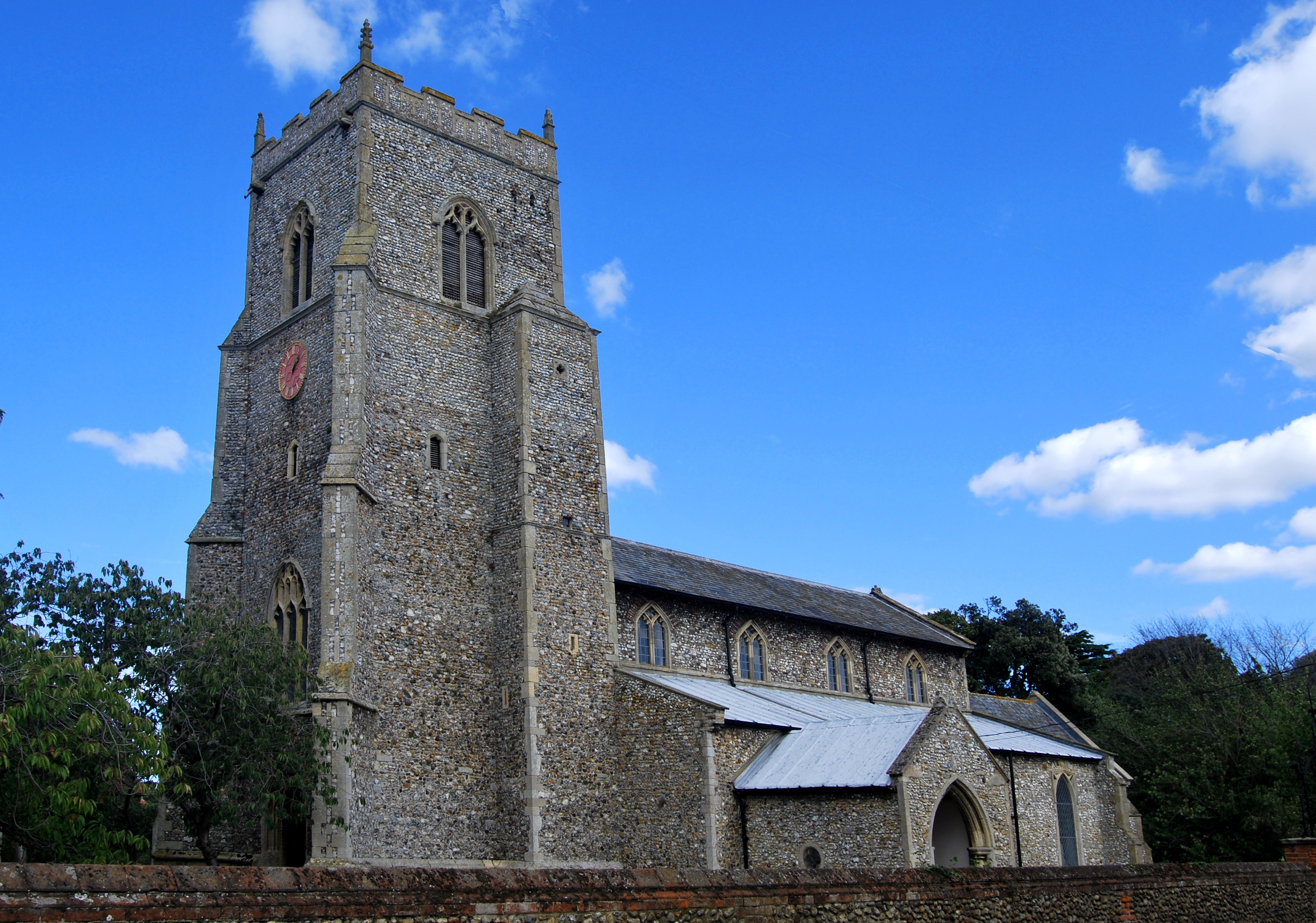
- St Mary the Virgin, Brancaster

- Location within Norfolk
- Area: 21.43 km^{2} (8.27 sq mi)
- Population: 797 (2011)
  - Density: 37/km^{2} (96/sq mi)
- OS grid reference: TF775438
- Civil parish: Brancaster
- District: King's Lynn and West Norfolk
- Shire county: Norfolk
- Region: East
- Country: England
- Sovereign state: United Kingdom
- Post town: KING'S LYNN
- Postcode district: PE31
- Dialling code: 01485
- Police: Norfolk
- Fire: Norfolk
- Ambulance: East of England
- UK Parliament: North West Norfolk

Brancaster is a village and civil parish on the north coast of the English county Norfolk. It is about 3 miles (4.8 km) west of the town Burnham Market, 22 miles (35 km) north of the town King's Lynn and 31 miles (50 km) north-west of the city Norwich. The parish includes the villages Brancaster and Brancaster Staithe and the former parish Burnham Deepdale, all of which lie along the A149 road. The Roman settlement Branodunum is on the edge of the village Brancaster.

The parish has an area of 8.27 square miles (21.4 km^{2}) and at the 2011 census had a population of 797 in 406 households. For the purposes of local government, the parish falls within the district King's Lynn and West Norfolk. It is on the North Sea coast, with the villages bordering Brancaster Manor marshes. Scolt Head Island, a barrier island designated as a National Nature Reserve within the neighbouring parish Burnham Norton, is immediately to the north of much the parish boundary.

== History ==
The Roman fort and settlement Branodunum is immediately to the east of the modern village of Brancaster. Built in around CE 230 to protect the approaches to The Wash, it later became part of the network of Saxon Shore forts protecting Roman Britain from attack by raiding forces. The fort was originally built with a harbour. The Roman-period shoreline is now inland.

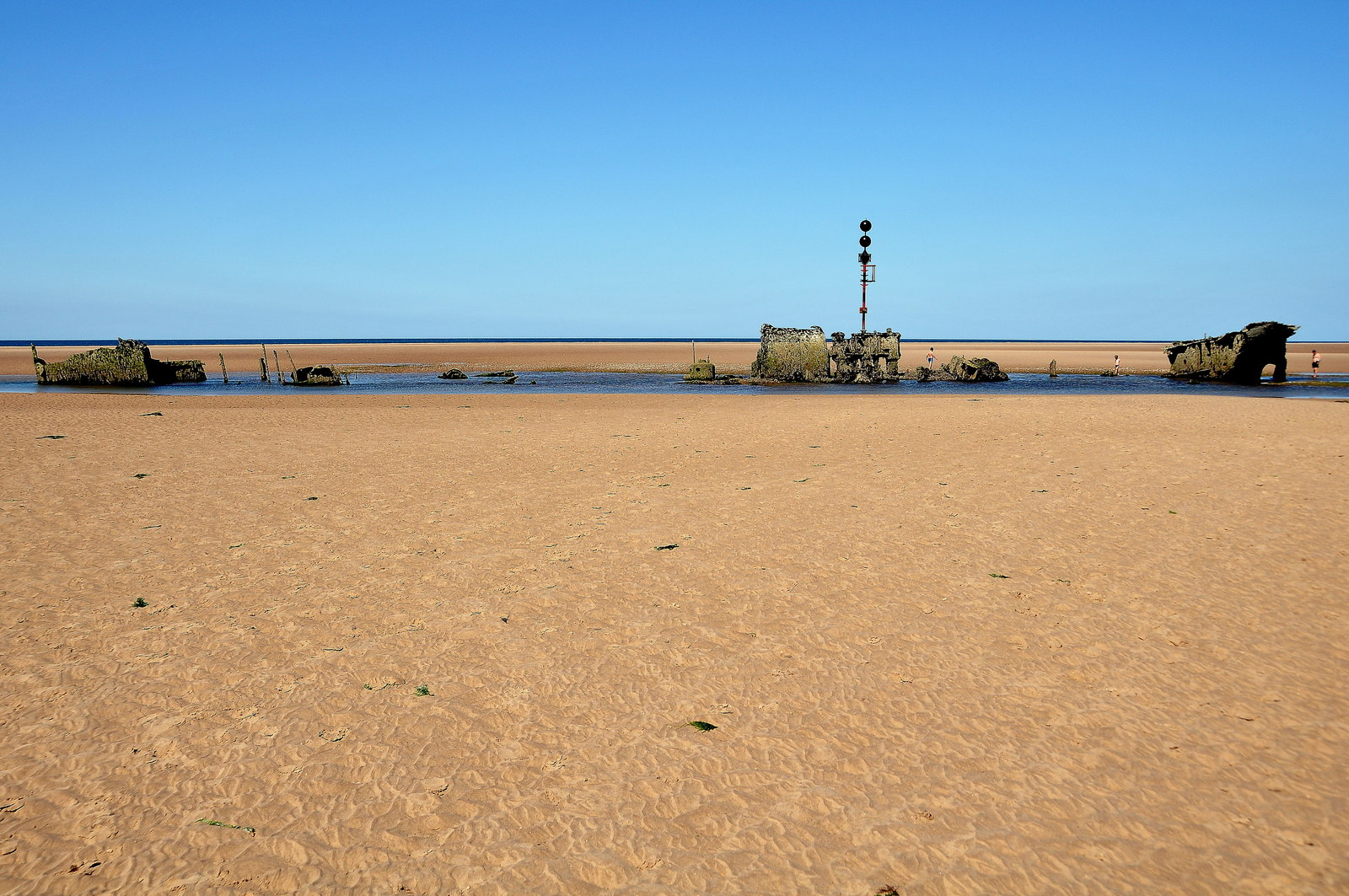
The wreck of the SS Vina (2010)

The wreck of the coaster SS Vina, which was used for target practice by the Royal Air Force before accidentally sinking in 1944, is visible at low tide on sand dunes. The ship dragged her anchor on 20 August 1944 in a north-westerly gale and ran ashore.

During the 1950s and '60s, Brancaster was considered as a possible location for the launch site for the British space programme.

== Geography ==
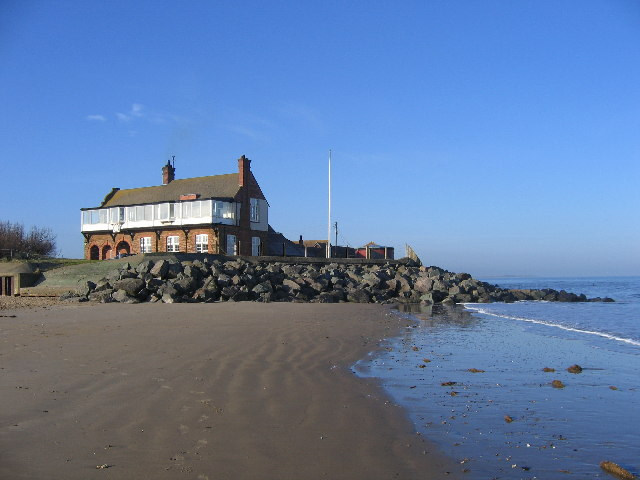
RWNGC clubhouse at high tide

The Royal West Norfolk Golf Club, founded in 1892, is located on the coastal section of the parish. The course was laid out by Horace Hutchinson, but due to the fragility of the coastline it has undergone many changes. At high tide the course can become an island, with parts of it inaccessible. In 2014 it was listed as the 47th best golf course in the UK and Ireland by Golf Monthly magazine.

Much of the coastal section of the parish, including Brancaster Manor marshes, are managed by the National Trust. The Norfolk Coast Path long distance footpath runs through the parish. A petrified forest can be seen on the foreshore near Brancaster at low tide, about 3/4 mile (1.2 km) west of the golf clubhouse. It consists of material similar to compacted peat or lignite. Fragments wash ashore after storms.

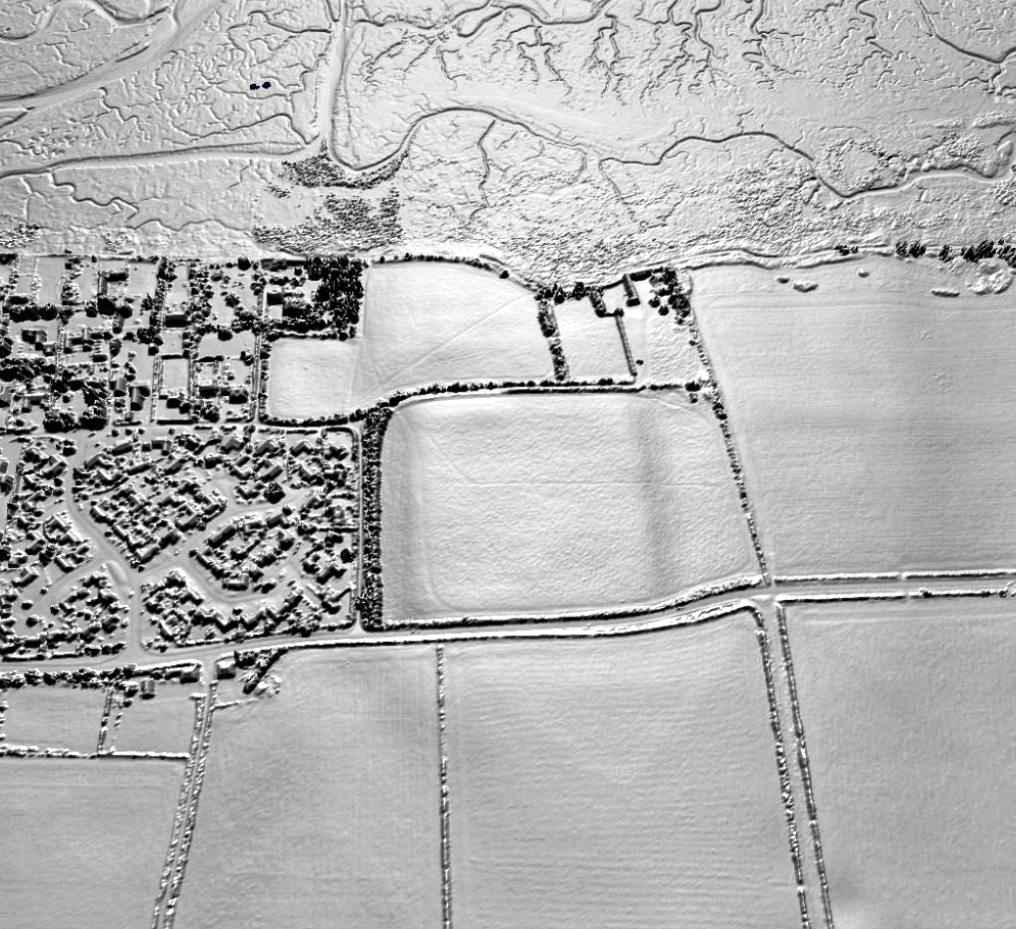
A lidar view of the site of Brancaster Roman fort

== Governance ==
An electoral ward in the same name exists. This ward had a population at the 2011 census of 1,293.

== Notable people ==
- John Brancastre (died 1218), churchman and administrator, was Vicar of Brancaster and was probably born in the village.
- John Weatherhead (1775–1797), Royal Navy officer, was born here, son of a Rector
- Captain Sir William Bolton (1777–1830), Royal Navy officer, grew up at Brancaster, where his father was Rector.
- Herbert Reeve (1868–1956), Rector of Brancaster 1924 to 1945
- Felicity Tree (1894–1978), socialite daughter of Herbert Beerbohm Tree, lived at Brancaster
