= Brancaster Manor =

Salt marsh near Brancaster, Norfolk, England

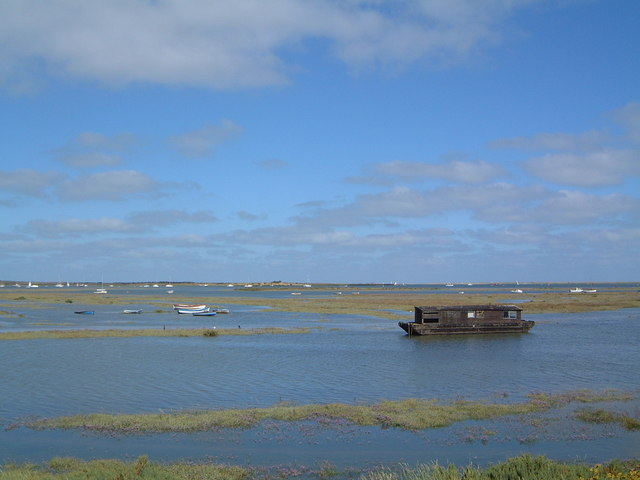

Brancaster Manor is a salt marsh owned by the National Trust near Brancaster, Norfolk, covering 810 ha (2,000 acres). It was originally purchased by the Brancaster Memorial Trust in 1964, and transferred to the National Trust in 1967. It is leased to Brancaster Staithe Fishermen's Society.

It was designated as a Site of Special Scientific Interest (SSSI) in 1968, and in 1986 it was subsumed into the 7,700 ha (19,000 acres) North Norfolk Coast Site of Special Scientific Interest. The larger area is now additionally protected through Natura 2000, Special Protection Area (SPA) and Ramsar listings, and is part of the Norfolk Coast Area of Outstanding Natural Beauty (AONB).

== Cited texts ==
- Paston-Williams, Sara (2006). Fish: Recipes from a Busy Island. Swindon: National Trust Books. ISBN 1905400071.
- Rodgers, Christopher P.; Straughton, Eleanor; Winchester, Angus J. L.; Pieraccini, Margherita (2010). Contested common land: environmental governance past and present. London: Routledge. ISBN 978-1849710947.
- Ryan, Peter (1969). The National Trust and the National Trust for Scotland. London: J M Dent. ISBN 978-0-460-03869-0.
