= Michael Vickers (bishop) =

English clergyman

The Rt Revd Michael Vickers MA(Oxon)
- Bishop of Colchester
- Diocese: Diocese of Chelmsford
- In office: 1988–1994
- Predecessor: Roderic Coote
- Successor: Edward Holland
- Other posts: Honorary assistant bishop in Blackburn (1994–present); Archdeacon of the East Riding (1981–1988)

Orders
- Ordination: 1959 (deacon); 1960 (priest)
- Consecration: 1988

Personal details
- Born: 13 January 1929 (age 97)
- Denomination: Anglican
- Parents: William & Florence
- Spouse: Janet Croasdale (m. 1960)
- Education: Worcester College, Oxford

Michael Edwin Vickers (born 13 January 1929) is a retired English clergyman. He served as area Bishop of Colchester from 1988 to 1994.

He was educated at St. Lawrence College, Ramsgate and Worcester College, Oxford before embarking on an ecclesiastical career with a curacy at Christ Church, Bexleyheath after which he was Senior Chaplain at Lee Abbey. Following this he was Vicar of St John's Newland, Hull. Later he became Rural Dean of Hull and then (his final appointment before appointment to the episcopate) Archdeacon of the East Riding. In retirement he continues to serve the Diocese of Blackburn as an Assistant Bishop.

He was made a deacon at Michaelmas 1959 (27 September) and ordained a priest the following Trinity Sunday (12 June 1960), both times by Christopher Chavasse, Bishop of Rochester, at Rochester Cathedral. He was consecrated a bishop on 2 February 1988 by Robert Runcie, Archbishop of Canterbury, at Westminster Abbey.

He owns a photograph of his great-great-great-grandmother who is the earliest-born authenticated person to appear in a photograph. Mary Buckingham (born in 1750) died, aged 101, in 1851. The photograph was taken c.1850.
