= Walter Goodacre =

British businessman and astronomer

Walter Goodacre (1856 – 1 May 1938) was a British businessman and amateur astronomer.

Walter Goodacre's 1910 map of the Moon

He was the second Director of the Lunar Section of the British Astronomical Association, serving from 1897 to 1937. He acted as the Association's president from 1922 to 1924. In 1910, he published a 77" diameter hand drawn map of the Moon. In 1931, he published a larger book of maps of the Moon's surface with descriptions of features.

Goodacre was elected a Fellow of the Royal Astronomical Society in 1885. He was a founding member of the British Astronomical Association in 1890. Goodacre made a donation to the Association in 1928 which endowed the Walter Goodacre Medal and Gift. Rev. T. E. R. Phillips was the first award recipient in 1930.

Goodacre was born in Loughborough in 1856. As a businessman, he expanded the family carpet manufacturing business to India and ran the company until his retirement. Goodacre died on 1 May 1938 at his residence in Bournemouth.
