= William Walters (priest) =

English churchman

William Walters (c.1833–1912) was an English churchman, Archdeacon of Worcester from 1889 to 1911.

Walters was educated at Eton and Christ Church, Oxford, where he matriculated in 1850 aged 17, and graduated B.A. in 1854. He was ordained in 1858. After a curacy at Hanley Castle he held incumbencies at Pershore, Alvechurch and Malvern Wells.

Church of England titles
Preceded by William Lea	Archdeacon of Worcester; 1889–1911	Succeeded by John Greig
