= Claybrooks =

Claybrooks is a surname. Notable people with the surname include:

- Chris Claybrooks (born 1998), American football player
- DeVone Claybrooks (born 1977), American football player and coach
- Felipe Claybrooks (born 1978), American football player

== See also ==
- Claybrook (disambiguation)
