= Alfred Pippard =

British engineer (1891–1969)

Alfred Pippard MBE FRS
- Born: 6 April 1891; Yeovil, Somerset
- Died: 2 November 1969 (aged 78); Putney, London,
- Education: University of Bristol
- Children: Brian Pippard
- Engineering career
- Discipline: Civil, aeronautical
- Institutions: Institution of Civil Engineers (president), Royal Society (fellow),
- Projects: R100 and R101 airships

Alfred John Sutton Pippard (6 April 1891 – 2 November 1969) was a British civil engineer and academic. Pippard was the son of a carpenter and joiner and spent much of his early life helping his father on construction sites. Initially supposed to follow his father into the family business, Pippard instead decided to study for a bachelor's degree in civil engineering at the University of Bristol, supporting himself with an Exhibition award. Pippard worked for a Bristol based consulting engineer and for the Pontypridd and Rhondda Valley Joint Water Board in his early career. He also completed his master's degree during this period.

At the start of the First World War Pippard joined the Admiralty Air Department where he studied aircraft stresses. After the war he joined an aeronautical engineering consultancy with many of his colleagues and was involved in accident investigation cases. He gained his Doctorate of Science from Bristol in 1920 and took up the chair in Civil Engineering at University College, Cardiff in 1922. This began a long career in academia at Cardiff, Bristol and Imperial College during which he was responsible for the analysis of the methods used in the design of the R100 and R101 airships. The public enquiry into the latter's crash, which ended British participation in airship development, found no faults with Pippard's work but he withdrew from the field of aeronautical engineering – feeling keenly the loss of several of his friends amongst the 48 dead.

During the Second World War Pippard was a member of the Civil Defence Research Committee which met at Princes Risborough and continued his teaching at Imperial College. Pippard was a member of the council of the Institution of Civil Engineers for fifteen years and was their president for the 1958-9 session. During his later career he chaired the fifteen-year investigation into pollution in the Thames tideway the length of which he was criticised for by the press. He was elected a Fellow of the Royal Society in 1954 and was pro-rector of Imperial college for the next year. He retired in 1956 and began a lecture tour of the United States and received honorary degrees from Bristol, Birmingham and Brunel Universities.

== Early life and training ==
Alfred John Sutton Pippard was born on 6 April 1891 in Yeovil and was the son of Alfred Pippard, a carpenter, joiner and devout Baptist. His family had a strong connection with the construction industry and included masons, stonecutters and plasterers. The elder Alfred was a renowned craftsman and worked on Yeovil Post Office, the offices of the Western Gazette, Yeovil Girls' High School, a bank in Weymouth and several private houses, often working as his own architect and drawing up the plans. During his youth the younger Alfred helped his father on several building sites.

Alfred attended several kindergarten schools before progressing to Yeovil School after which it was presumed that he would enter into the family business. However he particularly enjoyed his studies and wished to further them, to that end he applied to study at the Merchant Venturers College (which would become the Faculty of Engineering at the University of Bristol in 1909). He spent one year working for a local architect and engineer and studying for the London Matriculation exam which he passed in the summer of 1908 and started at the college in the autumn of that year.

During the Easter vacation of his first year at Bristol Pippard's father died and the family was put under great financial strain. With three siblings still at school it was only Pippard's winning of the Proctor Baker Exhibition with the accompanying payment of his tuition fees that allowed him to continue his studies. He graduated from Bristol with first class honours in 1911.

== Apprenticeship ==
The laws of the Institution of Civil Engineers (ICE) at the time required prospective members to undertake articled work for two years for a corporate member and Pippard arranged to work for Mr Cotterell of Bristol, the father of one of his friends who he had undertaken work for with his father as a joiner. However the family finances were still poor and his mother could not afford to provide him with his keep for two years and pay the premium that all apprenticeships entailed. Fortunately the Royal Commission for the Exhibition of 1851 had just started an industrial bursary scheme and invited applications from universities across the country. Bristol University submitted Pippard's name and he was accepted as one of ten successful applicants from across the country.

With the financial security provided by the bursary Pippard began work at Cotterell's offices in 1911. One of his first jobs was to design the steelwork for a warehouse in Bristol on which he gave a talk to the local students association of the ICE in 1913 for which he was awarded the Miller Prize and a set of drawing instruments which he used for the rest of his life. He completed his apprenticeship in 1913 and obtained a position as assistant engineer to the Pontypridd and Rhondda Valley Joint Water Board, he did not enjoy this routine work and disliked his district. To continue his interest in civil engineering he began a Master of Science dissertation on masonry dams which he wrote at evenings and weekends. This was submitted to his alma mater in April 1914, was approved and he subsequently received his MSc.

He began repaying his mother's financial assistance in 1915 and deeply regretted her death in 1921 before he could make any substantial contribution to her retirement.

== Admiralty Air Department ==
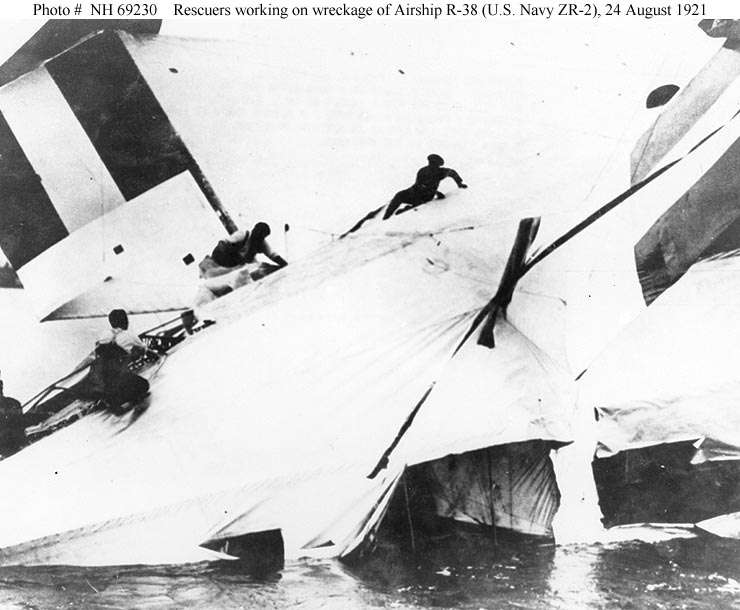
R38 airship wreckage

A few months after the start of World War I, Pippard resigned from the water board with the intention of contributing to the war effort. His poor eyesight barred him from a commission in the Royal Engineers so he entered his name of a register organised by the Institution of Civil Engineers to place their members in appropriate wartime jobs. Pippard's name was brought to the attention of HC Watts, who was a university classmate and a member of the technical section of the Admiralty Air Department. Pippard accepted a post as a technical advisor to the director of the department in January 1915.

Pippard's work with the department was to analyse stresses in airframes to ensure that they could survive the rigours of aerial combat, the work was of great importance to the war effort and he often found himself working for ten to twelve hours at a time. In December 1917 he married Olive Field, also from Yeovil, and they moved into a flat together at Earls Court, London. He was appointed a Member of the Order of the British Empire in the New Year Honours of 1918. Pippard joined an engineering consultancy in 1919 which was set up by Alec Ogilvie, an Air Department engineer, and several colleagues. Later that year Pippard and JL Pritchard, another colleague, wrote Aeroplane Structures which became a standard reference for aeronautical engineers and was revised in 1935. For this work, amongst others, he was awarded a Doctorate of Science by Bristol University in 1920. The firm was awarded several accident investigation contracts such as investigating the failure of the Tarrant Tabor triplane and the R38 airship disaster but was unable to win many large contracts due to the military and large aeronautical firms controlling the market. Pippard preferred his work as a visiting lecturer at Imperial College, London which he had started in 1919 and applied, and was accepted, for the chair of engineering at University College, Cardiff in 1922. He also wrote a series of scripts for radio broadcasts, including two made for schools.

== Academic life ==
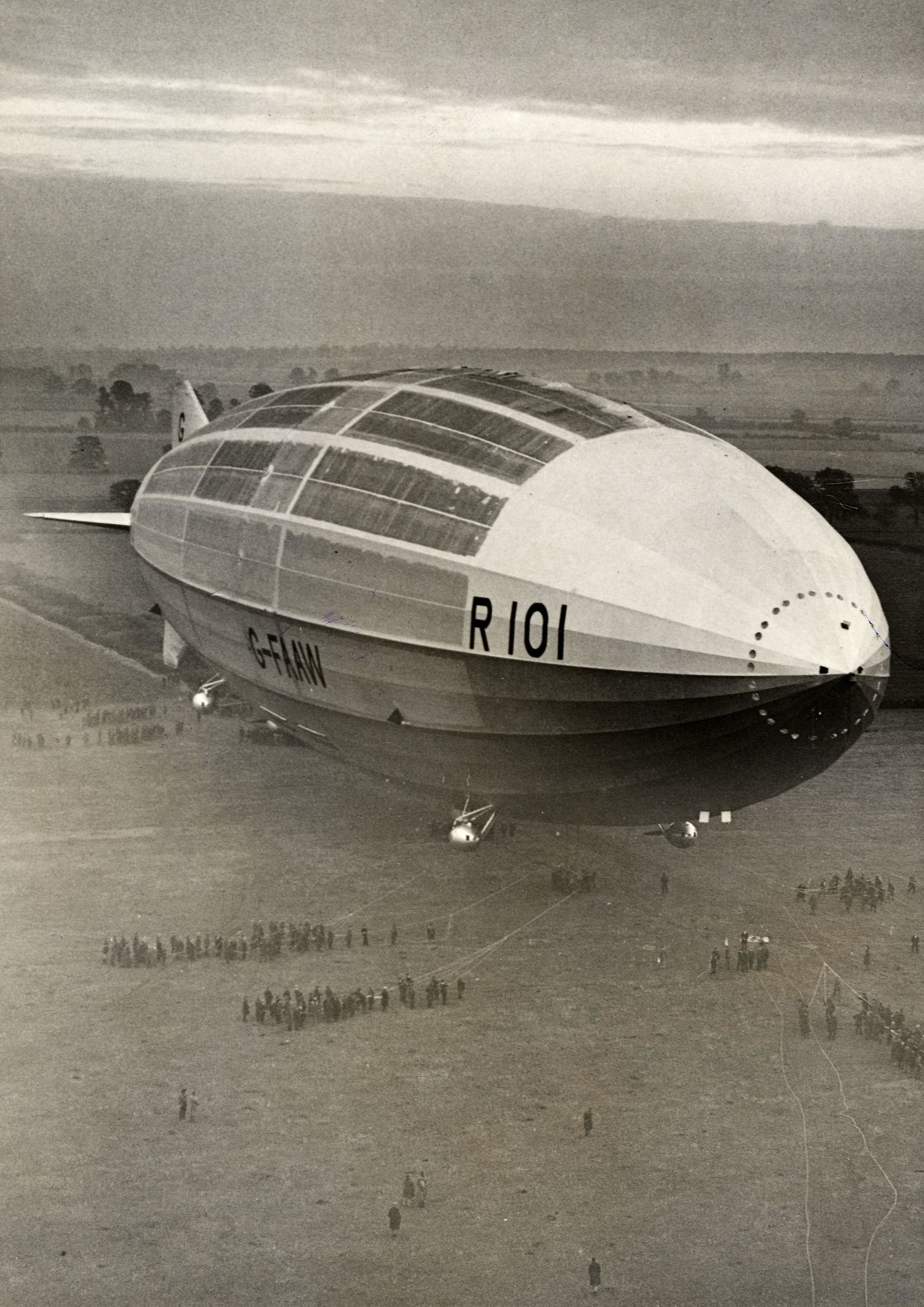
R101 test flight

Upon arriving at Cardiff Pippard set about modernising the department and attracting research opportunities. Pippard's most important research client was the Aeronautical Research Committee which agreed to pay the salary of a full-time assistant from January 1924. During this time Pippard and his assistant, John Baker, worked on proving the methods used to analyse airship frames which were proposed for use on the R100 and R101 airships. In 1928 Pippard was invited to take over the chair of civil engineering at Bristol University which he accepted.

At Bristol Pippard implemented many of the modernising methods he has developed at Cardiff and continued his work on the R100 and R101. He took part in the first test flight of the R101 but due to political pressure for quick development he was unable to finish his structural report before the R101 crashed on her final test flight on 5 October 1930, spelling the end for airship development in the United Kingdom. The public enquiry found that there were no faults with the airship's structure or the design methods employed by Pippard. However Pippard was so affected by the episode, particularly as several of his friends were among the 48 dead, that he withdrew from the field of aeronautical engineering and thereafter concentrated on civil engineering. He moved to Imperial College in London in 1933 and took over the running of the civil engineering department there where he actively encouraged a more research centric teaching method. This attitude was demonstrated in a paper presented to the Royal Aeronautical Society in 1935 in which he states that "University years should be devoted to the study of engineering science with as little emphasis as possible on the practical interests of the work". Pippard himself remained involved with the department's research, being particularly interested in the structural aspects of dams. For example, he recognised the importance of soil mechanics very early on, arranged lectures by Karl von Terzaghi in 1939 and supported Alec W. Skempton, that later doyen of British soil mechanics.

Pippard was also influential in the career of Letitia Chitty, recruiting the then promising mathematician to work at the Admiralty Air Department during World War I, an experience that prompted her to switch to engineering. She later joined Pippard at Imperial College working on aircraft and airship structural analysis projects.

== Second World War ==
In April 1939, predicting the approaching war, Pippard joined the Civil Defence Research Committee at the invitation of Sir John Anderson, Lord Privy Seal and minister in charge of air raid precautions. At the outbreak of the Second World War on 3 September 1939 he was assigned to the research and experiments section located in Princes Risborough. The section had little work to do and Pippard found himself bored, especially compared to his frantic work with the Air Department during the First World War. Fortunately the government's decision to allow university students to complete their degrees before compulsory national service meant that Pippard could spend four days of his week lecturing at Imperial College whilst remaining a member of the committee, a practice he continued for the rest of the war.

== Post-war ==
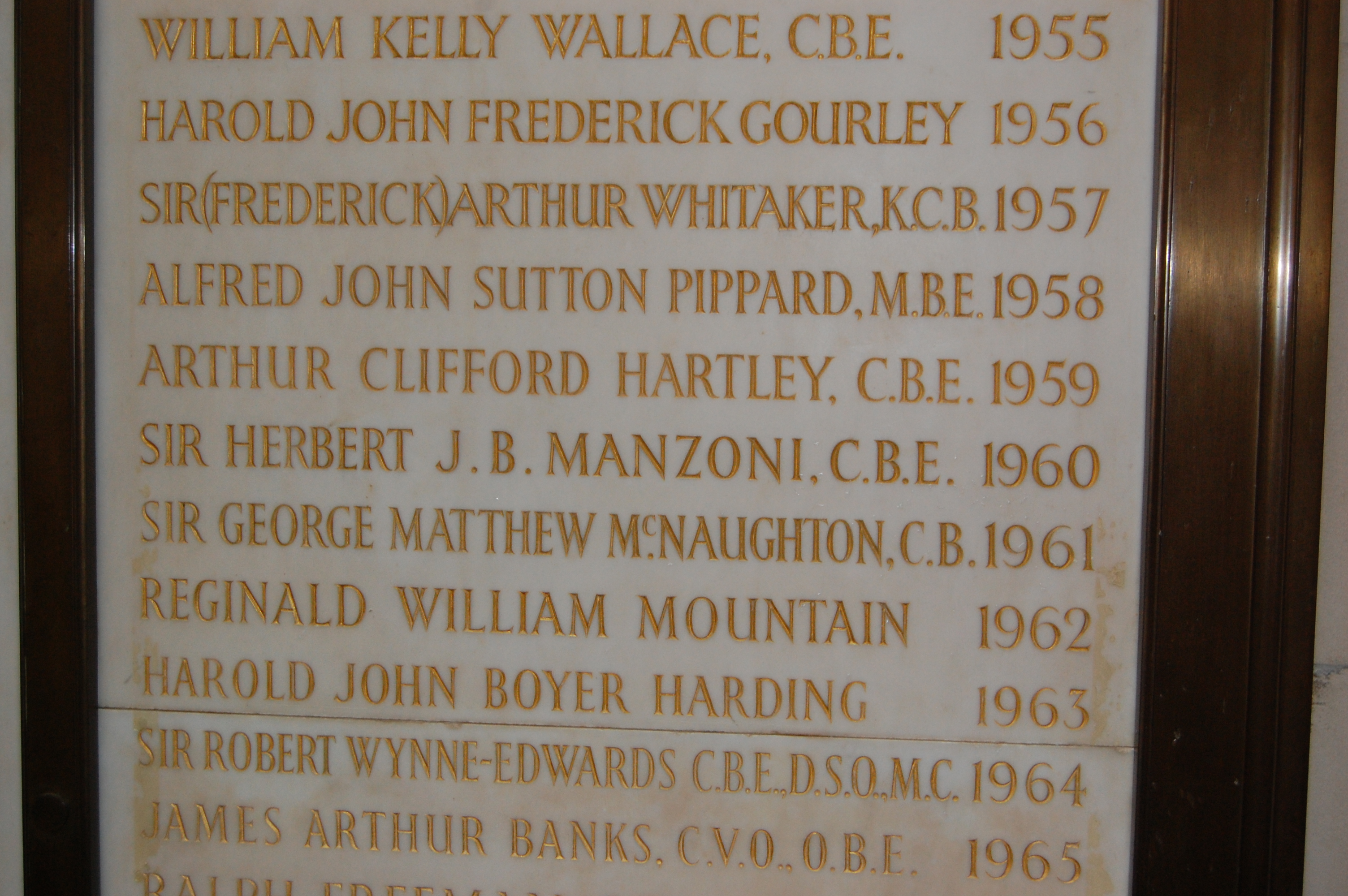
Pippard's name on the list of Institution of Civil Engineers presidents, at their One Great George Street headquarters

Pippard was elected to the council of the Institution of Civil Engineers in 1944 in which he continued to sit for the next fifteen years, advocating an increased academic presence in that body. His dedication to the institution led to his election as president for the 1958-9 session. In 1946 he introduced concrete and soil mechanics lecturers to the staff of Imperial College for the first time. In 1951 he was appointed by Hugh Dalton, the Minister of Local Government and Planning, to investigate pollution in the Thames tideway. This was a highly complex task which involved fifteen years of detailed investigation for which he was, perhaps unfairly, ridiculed in the press. Pippard was elected a Fellow of the Royal Society in 1954 and became pro-rector (assistant to the rector) of Imperial College the next year. After a year in this capacity Pippard retired in September 1956.

== Retirement ==
Upon retirement Pippard began a series of visiting lectures at Northwestern University in Illinois, United States. During his time in the US Pippard also delivered lectures at Berkeley, Purdue, Harvard and Urbana. Upon returning from America he took on the duties of the president of the Institution of Civil Engineers, which included a two-month visit to South Africa. In 1966 Pippard was awarded honorary degrees from both Bristol and Birmingham Universities and from Brunel University in 1968. Pippard continued to write on the theory of structures throughout his retirement and over the course of his life authored (or co-authored) more than 80 academic papers and six books. Towards the end of his life he began writing an autobiography which remained unfinished on his death. Pippard died in Putney, London on 2 November 1969 and the memorial service was held at St. Margaret's Church in Westminster.

Professional and academic associations
Preceded by Frederick Arthur Whitaker	President of the Institution of Civil Engineers; November 1958 – November 1959	Succeeded by Arthur Hartley
