= Thomas Chapman (bishop) =

Bishop of Colchester

Thomas Alfred Chapman (1867–1949) was an Anglican bishop in the first half of the twentieth century.

== Life ==
Educated at Exeter College, Oxford, he was ordained in 1890 and began his ecclesiastical career as a Curate at Charles Church, Plymouth. After this he was Vicar of St John, Carlisle and then Rural Dean of East Bristol. In 1899 he returned to Charles to be Rural Dean of the Three Towns and then a decade later became Rural Dean of St Peter's, Bolton before an 11-year spell as Bishop of Colchester.

== Notes ==
Church of England titles
| Preceded by Robert Henry Whitcombe | Bishop of Colchester; 1922 – 1933 | Succeeded by Charles Henry Ridsdale |
