= Charles Ridsdale =

British bishop (1873–1952)

Charles Henry Ridsdale (also Risdale; 1873–1952) was an eminent Anglican bishop in the first half of the twentieth century.

Educated at Malvern College and Trinity College, Oxford he was ordained in 1898. and began his ecclesiastical career as a Curate in Tideswell. After this he was head of the Trinity College Mission at Stratford; Vicar of St Margaret's, Leytonstone; and then Archdeacon of Gloucester before a 13-year spell as Bishop of Colchester (1933–1946).

== Notes ==
Church of England titles
Preceded by Thomas Chapman	Bishop of Colchester; 1933–1946	Succeeded by Dudley Narborough
