= Bishop of Colchester =

Episcopal title in the Church of England

The Bishop of Colchester is an episcopal title used by a suffragan bishop, who is also an area bishop, of the Church of England Diocese of Chelmsford in the Province of Canterbury, England.

The current bishop is Roger Morris, former Archdeacon of Worcester, who was consecrated as Bishop of Colchester on 25 July 2014 at St Paul's Cathedral, London.

The title takes its name after the town of Colchester in Essex and was first created under the Suffragan Bishops Act 1534. The suffragan bishops have been under the jurisdiction of a number of different dioceses. They were originally appointed for the Diocese of London but changed in 1845 to the Diocese of Rochester and again in 1877 to the Diocese of St Albans. With the creation of the Diocese of Chelmsford in 1914, the suffragan bishops now come under the jurisdiction of the Bishop of Chelmsford. The bishops suffragan of the diocese have also area bishops since the Chelmsford area scheme was erected in 1983.

== List of bishops ==
Bishops of Colchester
From	Until	Incumbent	Notes
1536	1541	William More	Consecrated on 22 October 1536; died in 1541.
1541	1592	in abeyance	
1592	1608	John Sterne	Consecrated on 12 November 1592; died in 1608.
1608	1882	in abeyance	
1882	1894	Alfred Blomfield	
1894	1909	Henry Johnson	
1909	1922	Robert Whitcombe	
1922	1933	Thomas Chapman	
1933	1946	Charles Ridsdale	
1946	1966	Dudley Narborough	
1966	1988	Roderic Coote	Formerly Bishop of Fulham; first area bishop from 1983
1988	1995	Michael Vickers	
1995	2001	Edward Holland	Formerly Suffragan Bishop in Europe
2001	2013	Christopher Morgan	
25 July 2014	present	Roger Morris	Previously Archdeacon of Worcester.
