= William More (bishop) =

Bishop of Colchester from 1536 to 1541

William More was appointed Bishop of Colchester to deputise within the Diocese of Ely under the provisions of the Suffragan Bishops Act 1534 in 1536 and held the post until his death in 1541. Educated at Cambridge University.

== Life ==
He is said to have been educated at both Oxford and Cambridge. He first appears as rector of Bradwell in Essex, having been collated 25 April 1534. On 5 October of the same year he was further collated to the rectory of West Tilbury in the same county, and then held the degree S.T.B.

On 20 October 1536 he was consecrated bishop of Colchester as suffragan to the Bishop of Ely. He was a master in chancery at the time. He became abbot of Walden in commendam at an unknown date. As abbot he presented to the vicarage of Walden on 29 September 1537 and was afterwards vicar there himself till his death.

On 22 March 1538 he surrendered the abbey of Walden on receiving a promise from Lord Audley to buy the archdeaconry of Leicester for him from his predecessor for £80. He obtained the archdeaconry in 1539 and died in 1540 or 1541.
