= Joy Tetley =

Joy Dawn Tetley (born 9 November 1946) is a Church of England priest. She was Archdeacon of Worcester from 1999 to 2008.

Tetley was educated at St Hugh's College, Oxford and ordained deaconess in 1977, deacon in 1987 and priest in 1994. She was a Lecturer at Trinity College, Bristol from 1983 to 1986; Rochester's Diocesan Director of Post-Ordination Training from 1988 to 1993; and Principal of the East Anglian Ministerial Training Course from 1993 to 1999. After her years as an Archdeacon she was the Area Director of Ordinands for the Diocese of Oxford from 2009 to 2010.

Church of England titles
Preceded by Frank Bentley	Archdeacon of Worcester; 1999–2008	Succeeded by Roger Morris
