= Frank Bentley (priest) =

British Archdeacon (1934–2024)

Frank William Henry Bentley (4 March 1934 – 15 November 2024) was an English Anglican clergyman who was Archdeacon of Worcester from 1984 to 1999.

Bentley was educated at Yeovil School and King's College London. He was ordained deacon in 1958 and priest in 1959. After a curacy in Shepton Mallet he held incumbencies in Babcary, Wiveliscombe and St Johns, Worcester before his Archdeacon’s appointment. Bentley died from heart failure on 15 November 2024, at the age of 90.

Church of England titles
Preceded by Peter Coleman	Archdeacon of Worcester; 1984–1999	Succeeded by Joy Tetley
