= William Swaddon (priest) =

English priest

William Swaddon was Archdeacon of Worcester from 1610 to 1623.

The son of William Swaddon, the MP for Calne from 1604 to 1605, he was educated at Winchester and New College, Oxford, He held incumbencies at Hazelbury and Great Horwood before being appointed Canon of Lincoln in 1595. After this he was Chaplain to Anne of Denmark who secured for him the Worcester Archdeaconry.
