= Claybrook sign =

- Differential diagnosis: rupture of an abdominal viscus.

Claybrook sign is a clinical sign in which heart sounds and breath sounds can be heard transmitted through the abdominal wall on auscultation. It occurs in patients with rupture of an abdominal viscus.

The sign is named after Edwin Claybrook.
