= Yeovil College =

Tertiary college in Somerset, UK

Coordinates: 50.954°N 2.632°W

Yeovil College is a tertiary college for further education and higher education based in Yeovil, Somerset. It maintains a main campus in the town and, at a second site, a Construction Skills Centre. In conjunction with the universities of Bournemouth, the West of England (UWE) and Gloucestershire, the college provides Higher Education, degree-level and professional courses at a third site known as the University Centre Yeovil (UCY). In Shaftesbury, the college runs the North Dorset Skills Centre.

== History ==
Preceding the current establishment was a Science and Arts college of which was first founded in 1887 by appointment of Somerset County Council. In 1947 the college re-branded, with the help of their first principal, as 'Yeovil Technical College', before finally, in September 1974, becoming the location of an early experimental Tertiary College, only the third such in the United Kingdom. The experiment was an attempt to see if it was possible to bring A-level and vocational education under one roof.

The current college was constituted from the existing Yeovil Technical College, and the sixth forms of Yeovil School (boys) and Yeovil High School (girls). Two existing sites were used: the old Tech College site (between Ilchester and Mudford Roads) became the main facility, while the nearby Yeovil School site (on Mudford Rd/Goldcroft) became an annexe containing the Science Department, and Business and Secretarial Schools. The subsequent new building eventually enabled the former college site to be vacated and sold for housing development. Teaching is now concentrated on the site of the former Tech College.

The teaching staff of the new college were also mainly retained from the previous Tech College, while almost the entire science department transferred from Yeovil School, giving the new college an excellent tradition in Science Education. Among other achievements, in its early years (1977 & 1981) the Chemistry Department twice won the annual "BBC Young Scientist of the Year" competition.

Deemed successful, the results of the experiment has given rise to the college in its present form as well as allowing room for expansion, notably with the introduction of Degree level study at the University Centre Yeovil.

== Leonardo Building ==
The Leonardo Building opened in September 2007 and is a 5.7 million pound development featuring new equipment and dedicated facilities for Design, Art, Engineering, Photography and Media Students. It was officially opened by David Laws MP in November 2007.

== Other Facilities ==
The college also has a beauty salon, Inner Beauty, two hairdressing salons (one in Yeovil, the Hair Zone, the other at the North Dorset Skills Centre, Headstart) and a restaurant, the Da Vinci. All are working, commercial ventures run by students and supervised by staff, and open to the public.

== Results ==
In 2010, A-Level results for students studying a full-time programme of at least three A-Levels achieved a 99.1% pass rate, from 95% in 2009 and 100% in 2008. However, results in traditionally difficult subjects including Biology, Chemistry, Physics, Maths and Further Maths have remained high and many of the college's recent top results have been in these areas.

In 2010, the full-time vocational pass rate was 95%, down from 97% in the previous year.

== Events ==
There are a number of key events in the College calendar. These include the annual production every February, the Further Education Awards every December, the Arts and Fashion Show in June and Festival Fortnight, featuring departmental awards ceremonies, at the end of the summer term.

== Further education ==
Yeovil College provides education for 16+ students after they leave secondary school, these courses include A-levels, GCSEs, BTEC Diplomas and the 14-19 Diplomas. The college also offers a variety of part-time courses and apprenticeships, as well as business training. Yeovil College also offers the Extended Project Qualification and AQA Baccalaureate to particularly able students as part of its Gifted and Talented programme.

== Higher education ==
Yeovil College operates the University Centre Yeovil (UCY) in partnership with Bournemouth University, the University of the West of England and the University of Gloucestershire. Degree courses are validated by these partner institutions. Qualifications provided include Foundation and Honours degrees, Higher National Diplomas/Certificates, teaching qualifications and professional qualifications. The latter include Chartered Institute of Marketing, the Chartered Institute of Purchasing & Supply and Institute of Legal Executives. Additionally, the centre offers its own access course and another from the Open College Network. The UCY has nursing students and offers a number of unique courses found nowhere else in the country, including a degree in Sustainable Graphics and Packaging and Garden History and Heritage Horticulture. The UCY holds a graduation ceremony every October.

== Structure ==
Following an internal restructuring in 2008, the college is now separated into the following departments of Faculties, each managed by a Faculty Director: Arts, Media and Publishing, Health, Care and Teacher Training, Business and Hospitality, Engineering and Construction, Sport, Hair, Beauty and Complementary Therapies and Preparation for Life and Work.

Further restructuring in 2014 has divided the curriculum into 12 "Areas" each have a centre area manager or CAM, the 12 are, Creative and Design Industries, Engineering, Construction, Motor vehicle, Hospitality, A-Levels, IT, Hair and Beauty Health, social care, Sport, Prep for working life, Business studies.

== Sport ==
The College nurtures sporting talent and students are selected to play at regional, national and international levels. The College participates in the Talented Athlete Scholarship Scheme (TASS) run by the Department for Digital, Culture, Media and Sport. It also has a number of academies for sports including men's and women's rugby, badminton, football, athletics and cross country, although it has been known to support more specialist sports persons in other areas, such as martial arts. The college is also Inclusive Fitness Initiative accredited Fitness Centre and has recently gained Premier status for Badminton.

Men's football has been particularly successful in the last 5 years, with Yeovil College 1st team finishing Runner-up in the 2006/2007 National College Cup Final.

== Student Union ==
The college has a student union, known as YCSU (Yeovil College Student Union). YCSU organises different events throughout the year from parties and shopping trips to a freshers' fair. Every Yeovil College student is automatically a member. The YCSU is also heavily involved in raising money for local and national charities.

== Notable alumni ==
- Derek Boshier (19 June 1937 – 5 September 2024), English artist.
