= Claybrook House (Kearney, Missouri) =

Historic house in Missouri, United States

- U.S. National Register of Historic Places
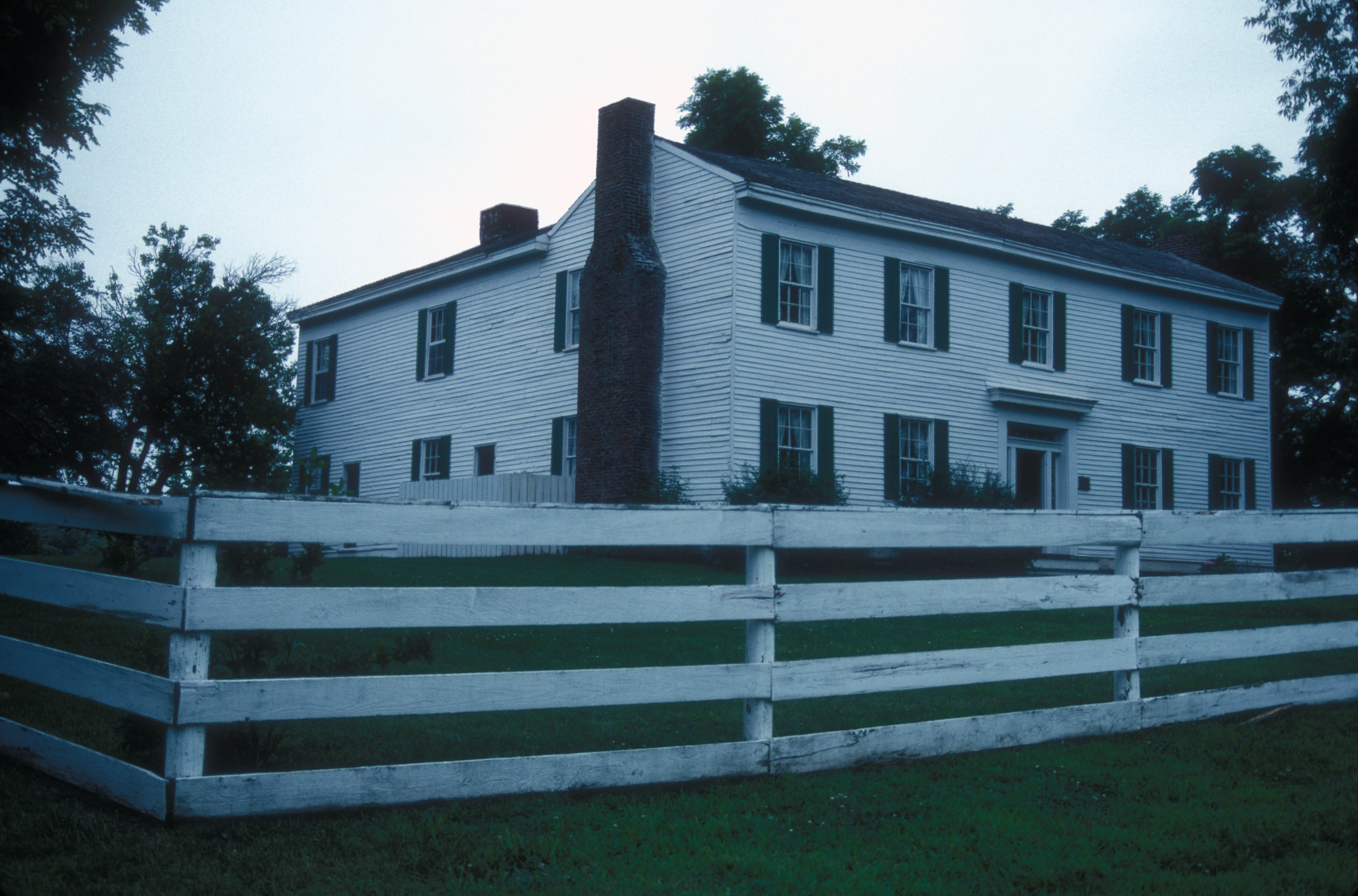
- Claybrook House, January 2007

- Location within Missouri Location within the United States
- Location: Northeast of Kearney, Kearney, Missouri
- Coordinates: 39°23′17″N 94°20′9″W
- Area: 10 acres (4.0 ha)
- Built: c. 1858
- Built by: Claybrook, George C.
- Architectural style: Federal
- NRHP reference No.: 81000332
- Added to NRHP: December 21, 1981

Claybrook House is a historic home located near Kearney, Clay County, Missouri. It was built about 1858, and is a two-story, L-shaped, Federal style frame dwelling. It features a Greek Revival style entrance surrounded by 14 window lights.

It was listed on the National Register of Historic Places in 1981.

An intended "controlled burn" burn next to Claybrook House got out of control on March 12, 2002, and the house burned to the point of requiring demolition. [3]
