= William Hodges (priest) =

English priest

The Venerable William Hodges, D.D. was an Anglican priest in England during the 17th-century.

Hodges was born in Chittlehampton and educated at Exeter College, Oxford. He held livings at Bampton and Ripple. Hillerson was Archdeacon of Buckingham from 1671 until his death on 1 November 1684.
