= Hugh Lloyd (priest) =

English priest

Hugh Lloyd was a 17th-century English priest.

Lloyd was educated at Jesus College, Oxford. He was archdeacon of Worcester from 1623 to 1629.
