= Edwin Claybrook =

American surgeon

Edwin Claybrook (1872 – February 28, 1931) was an American surgeon remembered for describing Claybrook sign. He died on February 28, 1931, at Alleghany Hospital.
