= Robert Jones (archdeacon of Worcester) =

British Anglican priest

Robert George Jones (born 30 October 1955) is a British retired Anglican priest.

Jones was brought up in Birmingham and was confirmed in St John's, Halesowen in 1966. He studied for a degree in Modern Languages at Durham University (Hatfield College), graduating in 1977. He trained for ordination at Ripon College, Cuddesdon. A fluent German speaker, he is involved in the Worcester diocesan partnership with Magdeburg and the Church of England's Meissen Agreement with the German Protestant Church.

He was ordained in 1980 and spend four years as a curate at Holy Innocents, St John's and St Peter's in Kidderminster. He served as Vicar of St. Francis in Dudley for eight years and then as Rector of St. Barnabas with Christ Church in Worcester for fourteen years.

He was also Rural Dean of Worcester East, is an Honorary Canon of Worcester Cathedral and served as one of the diocesan representatives to the General Synod for ten years. He has most recently been the Director of Development, heading the team responsible for both clergy and lay training across the Diocese.

On 16 November 2014 Jones was installed as the Archdeacon of Worcester. Jones retired effective 30 November 2023.
