= T. E. R. Phillips =

English astronomer (1868–1942)

Theodore Evelyn Reece Phillips (28 March 1868 – 13 May 1942), known as T. E. R. Phillips, was an English clergyman and amateur astronomer.

Phillips was born in Kibworth, Leicestershire, the son of the Rev. Abel Phillips, a missionary in West Africa, and was educated at Yeovil Grammar School. He then joined St Edmund Hall, Oxford. He held the following curacies: Holy Trinity, Taunton, Somerset (1891), Hendford, Yeovil (1895), St. Saviour's, Croydon (1901), and Ashtead, Surrey (1906). In 1907 Phillips married Millicent Harriet Kynaston (ca. 1874–1964). They had one son, John Evelyn Theodore Phillips (1907-1978). In 1916 he was appointed vicar of Headley where he remained for the rest of his life.

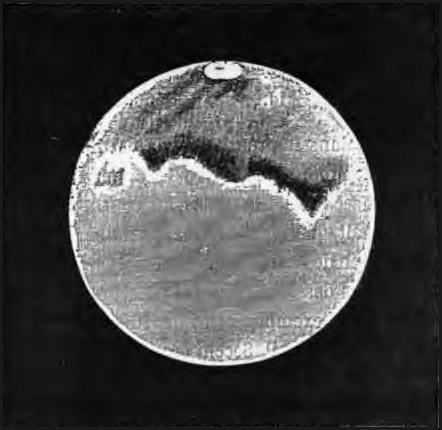
Drawing of Mars, 15 Oct, 1862

As an amateur astronomer, he observed planets including Mars and Jupiter making a very thorough study of the surface currents on Jupiter. He joined the British Astronomical Association on 25 November 1896 and the Royal Astronomical Society as a Fellow on 12 May 1899. He was director of the Jupiter section of the British Astronomical Association from 1900–1933 and director of the Saturn section from 1935–1940. He was president of the British Astronomical Association between 1914 and 1916. He was president of the Royal Astronomical Society between 1927 and 1929. Has a member of the IAU commission on planets.

Phillips won the Jackson-Gwilt Medal of the Royal Astronomical Society in 1918. He received the first Walter Goodacre Medal and Gift from the British Astronomical Association in 1930.

He co-wrote Splendour of the Heavens with W. H. Steavenson in 1923.

In an addition to astronomy, he took an active interest in meteorology.
