= William Claybrook =

English priest

The Venerable William Claybrook was a priest in England during the 16th-century.

Claybrook was educated at the University of Oxford. He was the Rector of All Hallows, Lombard Street in the City of London. He was Archdeacon of Worcester from 1531 until 1534.
