= Richard Hone =

Anglican priest and author

Richard Brindley Hone (born Gloucester 12 March 1805 – died Halesowen 20 February 1881) was a nineteenth century Anglican priest and author.

== Life ==
Hone was educated at Brasenose College, Oxford and ordained in 1828. After a curacy in Portsmouth he became Vicar of Halesowen in 1836. He was also Archdeacon of Worcester from 1849 Hone wrote The Lives of James Usher, Abp. of Armagh, Henry Hammond, John Evelyn and Thomas Wilson, Bp. of Sodor and Man.

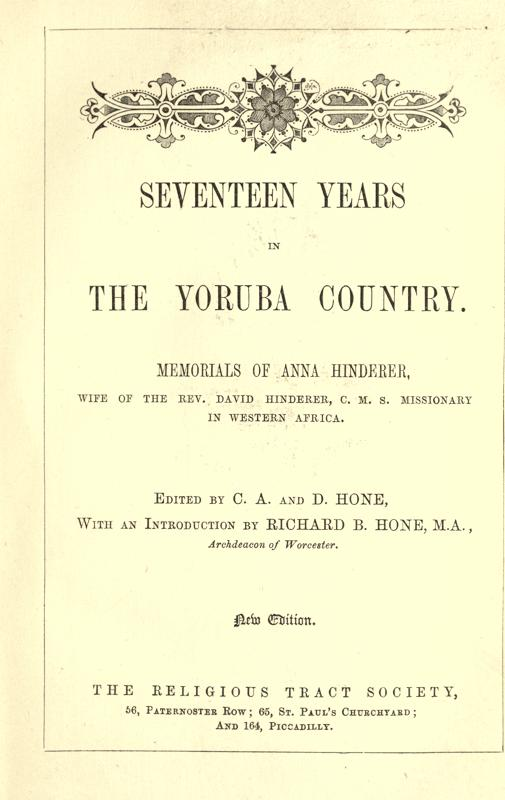
Anna Hinderer's book's frontispiece

The missionary Anna Hinderer died in Martham in Norfolk in 1870 where her husband was acting as curate. Her biography was pulled together by two Hone sisters and Richard wrote the introduction to Seventeen Years in the Yoruba Country Anna's husband was shown as joint author although the Hones were mentioned on the frontispiece. The book raised £31 and this was sent to Daniel and Sussanah Olubi who had taken over the Hinderer mission in Ibadan.

Richard Hone died in 1881.
