= Archdeacon of Worcester =

Church of England ecclesiastical office

Coordinates: 52.5°N 2.1°W

The Archdeacon of Worcester is a senior clergy position in the Diocese of Worcester in the Church of England. Among the archdeacon's responsibilities is the care of clergy and church buildings within the area of the Archdeaconry of Worcester.

== History ==
The first recorded archdeacons in the Diocese of Worcester occur from c. 1086 around the same time that archdeacons occur across the church in England. Two archdeacons are recorded simultaneously from that time, but no clear territorial title occurs until 1143, when Gervase is called Archdeacon of Gloucester.

The Archdeaconry of Birmingham was created from Worcester and Coventry archdeaconries by Order-in-Council on 12 August 1892 but became part of the new Diocese of Birmingham upon its creation by Order-in-Council on 13 January 1905.

The archdeaconry is currently subdivided into six deaneries: Evesham, Malvern, Martley and Worcester West, Pershore, Upton, and Worcester East. The current Archdeacon of Worcester is the Venerable Mark Badger.

== Deaneries, area deans and lay chairs as of 2024 ==
Deanery	Rural dean	Lay chair
Pershore & Evesham	The Revd Sarah Dangerfield	Robin Lunn
Malvern & Upton	The Revd Gary Crellin	Maria Toman
Kidderminster & Stourport	The Revd Tim Williams	Clare Stockford
Worcester	The Revd Diane Cooksey	Sue Roulstone

== List of archdeacons ==
=== High Medieval ===
Senior archdeacon of the diocese:

- bef. 1086–bef. 1114 (d.): Ailric
- bef. 1114–21 March 1125 (d.): Hugh (probably previously junior archdeacon)

Archdeacons of Worcester:

- 1125–1143 (deprived): William Cumin (also Bishop-elect of Durham, 1141; deprived)
- 1144–bef. 1157 (res.): Godfrey
- bef. 1157–bef. 1159 (d.): William Cumin (restored)
- bef. 1159–bef. 1168 (d.): Godfrey (restored)
- bef. 1168–bef. 1190 (d.): Simon Luvel
- bef. 1190–bef. 1198 (d.): Peter de Leche
- bef. 1198–aft. 1196: John of Cornwall
- bef. 1200–aft. 1217: John Brancastre
- December 1218–bef. 1243: William Scot (also Bishop-elect of Durham, 1226–1227)
- June 1243–aft. 1256: Vincent of Abergavenny
- bef. 1257–aft. 1270: Robert de Esthall
- bef. 1275–27 July 1287 (d.): Hugh of Evesham
- 16 October 1287 – 4 July 1288 (deprived): Ralph de Hingham
- 4 July 1288–aft. 1311: Francesco Napoleone Cardinal Orsini (also cardinal-deacon of Santa Lucia in Orthea from 1295)

=== Late Medieval ===
- 1312–1317 (d.): Henri de la Tour du Pin (later Bishop of Metz)
- aft. 1317–1320 (d.): John de Brucy
- 15 May 1321–bef. 1329 (d.): Adam le Chaumpeneys de Sandwico
- 17 October 1329 – 7 April 1337 (exch.): John de Orleton
- 7 April 1337–bef. 1349: Robert de Worcester
- 16 May 1349 – 18 February 1353 (exch.): John de Severle
- 18 February 1353 – 1366 (res.): John Harewell (became Bishop of Bath and Wells)
- 1366–4 May 1371 (exch.): Simon Clement
- 4 May 1371–bef. 1383 (d.): John Blanchard
- 4 December 1383 – 1389 (res.): William Malpas (royal candidate)
- 2 May 1388–bef. 1412: William Rocombe (papal candidate)
- 28 October 1412–bef. 1432 (res.): John Ixworth
- 31 May 1431–bef. 1433 (res.): John Burdett
- 5 May 1433 – 13 November 1438 (exch.): William Hende
- 13 November 1438–bef. 1452 (res.): John Verney (probably Dean of Lichfield, 1432–1447)
- 19 October 1452–bef. 1467 (res.): William Vaunce
- 12 November 1467–bef. 1472 (res.): Thomas Hawkins (previously Archdeacon of Stafford)
- 4 May–May 1472 (res.): Robert Inkbarrow
- 19 May 1472–bef. 1476 (d.): Thomas Hawkins (again)
- 26 July–bef. November 1479: John Burton
- 24 November 1479 – 1483 (res.): Richard Burton
- 4 August 1483–aft. 1518: Thomas Alcock
- bef. 1529–1531 (res.): Stephen Gardiner (became Bishop of Winchester)
- 4 April 1531–bef. 1534 (d.): William Claybrook
- 12 May 1534 – 1563 (d.): Peter Vannes (also Dean of Salisbury from 1536)

=== Early modern ===
- 1563–bef. 1579 (res.): Thomas Powell
- 15 July 1579 – 1598 (res.): Godfrey Goldsborough (became Bishop of Gloucester)
- 1598–bef. 1610 (res.): John Johnson
- 1610–4 August 1623 (d.): William Swaddon
- 1623–bef. 1629 (d.): Hugh Lloyd
- 3 August 1629–bef. 1645 (d.): Edward Thornborough
- 30 May 1645–bef. 1676 (d.): William Hodges
- 4 September 1676–bef. 1705 (d.): John Fleetwood
- 14 December 1705 – 7 August 1742 (d.): William Worth
- 10 September 1742 – 21 November 1774 (d.): John Tottie
- 1775–8 March 1787 (d.): John Warren
- 21 March 1787 – 12 August 1815 (d.): Thomas Evans
- 29 August 1815 – 18 October 1849 (d.): Richard Onslow
- 9 November 1849 – 5 May 1881 (d.): Richard Hone

=== Late modern ===
- May 1881 – 1889 (d.): William Lea, sometime Vicar of St Peter's Droitwich
- 1889–1911 (ret.): William Walters, Vicar of Pershore until 1894, then Rector of Alvechurch until 1904, then Vicar of Malvern Wells from 1905
- 1911–1921 (res.): John Greig, Rector of Hartlebury (became Bishop of Gibraltar)
- 1921–1938 (ret.): James Peile, Rector of Alvechurch until 1925, then of Ripple until 1926
- 1938 – 26 September 1944 (d.): Ridley Duppuy (Canon, Assistant Bishop of Worcester from 1936, and Vice-Dean from 1940; former Bishop of Victoria)
- 1944–1961 (ret.): Thomas Wilson, Rector of Hartlebury until 1956
- 1961–1975 (ret.): Peter Eliot, Vicar of Cropthorne with Charlton until 1965 (afterwards archdeacon emeritus)
- 1975–1980 (ret.): John Williams (afterwards archdeacon emeritus)
- 1981–1984 (res.): Peter Coleman (became Bishop suffragan of Crediton)
- 1984–1999 (ret.): Frank Bentley (afterwards archdeacon emeritus)
- 1999–2008 (res.): Joy Tetley
- 5 October 2008 – 25 July 2014 (res.): Roger Morris (became area Bishop of Colchester)
- 16 November 2014 – 30 November 2023: Robert Jones
- 2 December 2023 – present Mark Badger

== Sources ==
- Greenway, Diana E. (1971), Fasti Ecclesiae Anglicanae 1066–1300, vol. 2, pp. 104–105
- Greenway, Diana E. (1971), Fasti Ecclesiae Anglicanae 1066–1300, vol. 2, pp. 105–107
- Jones, B. (1963), Fasti Ecclesiae Anglicanae 1300–1541, vol. 4, pp. 62–63
- Horn, Joyce M. (1992), Fasti Ecclesiae Anglicanae 1541–1857, vol. 7, pp. 113–114
