= Murugesan =

Murugesan is a given name and a surname. Notable people with the name include:

- K. Murugesan Anandan, member of the 15th Lok Sabha of India
- Murugesan Kulasegaran (born 1957), Malaysian politician and barrister
- Murugesan Mahendran (born 1947), Malaysian field hockey player
- A. Nanjil Murugesan, Indian politician
- Arun Murugesan, Indian Weightlifter
- D. Murugesan, Indian politician
- D Murugesan, former Chief Justice of Delhi High Court
- Meesai Murugesan (1930–2014), veteran actor and musician in Tamil films
- P. Murugesan, politician
- Parasurama Naidu Murugesan, former Flag Officer of the Indian Navy
- Rajesh Murugesan (born 1988), Indian music composer including Malayalam cinema
- S. Murugesan (AIADMK politician), Indian politician and former Member of Parliament
- Shurentheran Murugesan (born 1956), Malaysian field hockey player
- Vasuki Murugesan, politician
- T. S. Murugesan Pillai (1870–1930), Telugu writer, poet and translator
- Murugesan Sinnandavar (born 1967), social activist in Selangor, Malaysia
- Ranjeet Virali-Murugesan (born 1985), Indian tennis player

== See also ==
- Vedigundu Murugesan (transl. Bomb Murugesan), a 2009 Tamil-language comedy film
- Margeson
- Margesson
- Margison
