= Henshall =

Henshall is a surname. Notable people with the surname include:

- Alex Henshall (born 1994), English footballer
- Audrey Henshall (1927–2021), British archaeologist
- Daniel Henshall (born 1982), Australian actor
- Douglas Henshall (born 1965), Scottish actor
- Hugh Henshall (1734-1816), English civil engineer
- Horace Henshall (1889-1951), English footballer
- James Henshall (1907-1969), English footballer
- James Alexander Henshall (1836-1925), American author
- John Henry Henshall (1856-1928), English artist
- May Dexter Henshall (1867–1962), American educator, clubwoman, and librarian
- Nicholas Henshall (born 1962), Anglican dean
- Michael Henshall, English Church of England bishop
- Paul Henshall (born 1977), British actor
- Richard Henshall (born 1984), English musician
- Ruthie Henshall (born 1967), British singer, dancer and actress
- Samuel Henshall (1764/5–1807), English clergyman, writer and inventor of type of corkscrew
- Scott Henshall (born 1975), British fashion designer

== See also ==
- David Henshall Emerging Artist Prize, an Australian award for glass art
