= Peter Judd =

Peter Judd may refer to:

- Peter A. Judd, Latter Day Saint writer and religious leader
- Peter Judd (cricketer) (1938–2025), English cricketer
- Peter Judd (priest) (born 1949), retired Dean of Chelmsford
