= Alban Hills =

Volcanic caldera in Italy

- Colli Albani
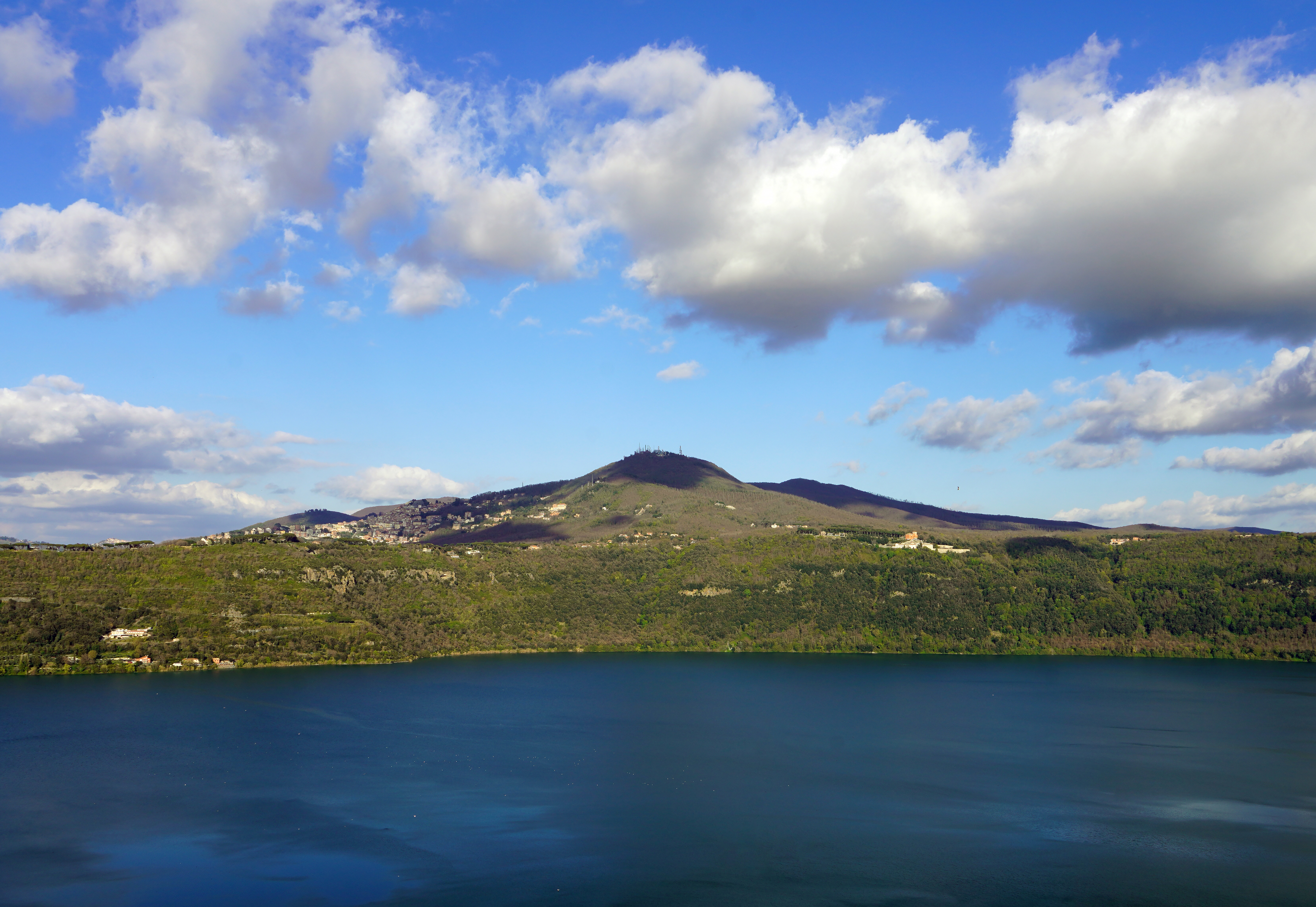
- Monte Cavo (the Alban Mount) and Alban Lake

Highest point
- Peak: Maschio delle Faete
- Elevation: 956 m (3,136 ft)
- Coordinates: 41°43′48″N 12°42′00″E

Geography
- Location within Italy
- Location: East of Rome, Italy

Geology
- Rock age: 25,000 Ka
- Mountain type: Calderas
- Rock type(s): Phonotephrite, Tephri-phonolite
- Last eruption: 5,000 BC

The Alban Hills (Italian: Colli Albani) are the caldera remains of a quiescent volcanic complex in Italy, located 20 km (12 mi) southeast of Rome and 24 km (15 mi) north of Anzio. The 950 m (3,120 ft) high Monte Cavo forms a highly visible peak in the centre of the caldera, but the highest point is Maschio delle Faete approximately 2 km (1.2 mi) to the east of Cavo and 6 m (20 ft) higher. There are subsidiary calderas along the rim of the Alban Hills that contain lakes Albano and Nemi. The hills are composed of peperino (lapis albanus), a variety of tuff that is useful for construction and provides a mineral-rich substrate for nearby vineyards.

== History ==
The hills, especially around the shores of the lakes, have been popular since prehistoric times. From the 9th to 7th century BC, there were numerous villages (such as the legendary Alba Longa and Tusculum). The area was inhabited by the Latini during the 5th to 3rd centuries BC.

The ancient Romans called Monte Cavo the Albanus Mons. On the summit was the sanctuary of Jupiter Latiaris, in which the consuls celebrated the Feriae Latinae, and several generals celebrated victories here during times when they were not accorded a regular triumphs in Rome. The foundations and some of the architectural fragments of the temple were still in existence until 1777, when they were used to build the Passionist monastery by Cardinal York, but the Via Triumphalis leading up to it can still be seen.

In Roman times, the area was often used by the rich as a way to escape the heat and crowds of Rome, as it is today as shown by the many villas and country houses present.

== Towns and cities ==
The towns and villages in the Alban Hills are known as the Castelli Romani.

== Volcanic activity ==
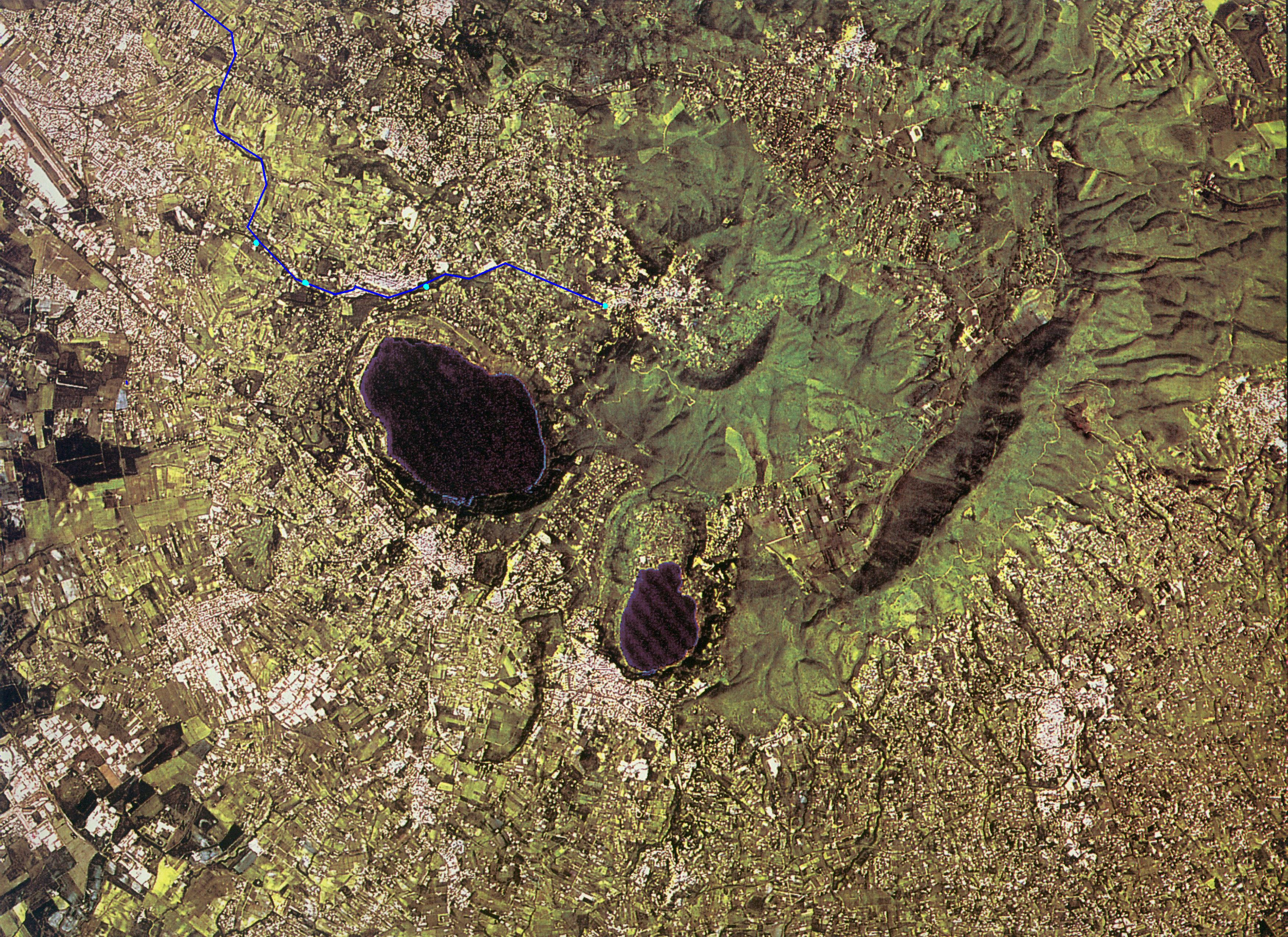
Aerial view showing the main caldera and several secondary ones around the rim

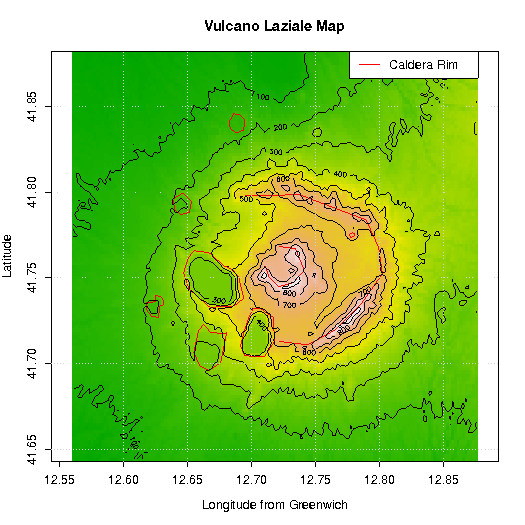
Topographic map of the Alban Hills showing the caldera rims

Examination of deposits have dated the four most recent eruptions to two temporal peaks, around 36,000 and 39,000 years ago. The area exhibits small localised earthquake swarms, bradyseism, and release of carbon dioxide and hydrogen sulfide into the atmosphere. The uplift and earthquake swarms have been interpreted as caused by a slowly growing spherical magma chamber 5–6 kilometres below the surface; some think that it may erupt again; if so, there is risk to Rome, which is only 25 to 30 km away.

Plutarch reports that in 406 BC, Lake Albano surged over the surrounding hills, despite there being no rain nor tributaries flowing into the lake to account for the rise in water level. The ensuing flood destroyed fields and vineyards before eventually pouring into the sea. It is thought to have been a limnic eruption caused by volcanic gases, trapped in sediment at the bottom of the lake and gradually building up until suddenly releasing, causing the water to overflow.

There is documentary evidence which may describe an eruption in 114 BC, but the absence of Holocene geological deposits has largely discredited it as a volcanic event and instead the account is considered to be a description of a forest fire.

The volcano emits large amounts of carbon dioxide which can potentially reach lethal concentrations if it accumulates in depressions in the ground in the absence of wind. The asphyxiation of 29 cows in September 1999 prompted a detailed survey, which found that concentration of the gas at 1.5 m above the ground in a residential area on the northwestern flank sometimes exceeded the occupational health threshold of 0.5%. Eight sheep were killed in a similar incident in October 2001.

== People ==
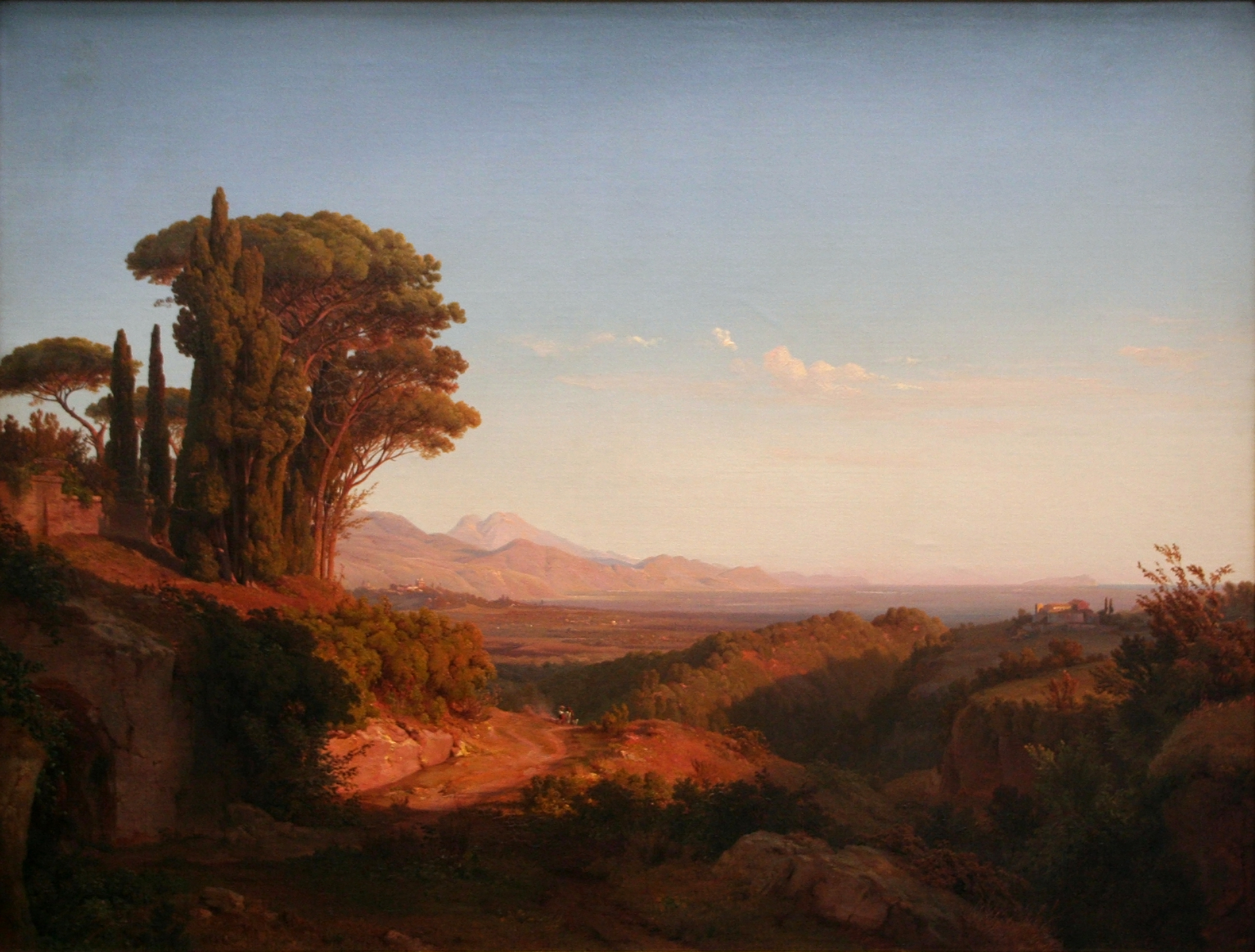
Louis Gurlitt, Alban Hills (1850)

Writers and artists who have produced work about this area include:

- Thomas Ashby, archaeologist, wrote The Roman Campagna in Classic Time
- William Brockedon painter and illustrator of guide-books
- George Gordon Byron in Childe Harold's Pilgrimage
- Charles Coleman painter
- Johann Wolfgang von Goethe in Italian Journey
- Louis Gurlitt, German painter
- Jacob Philipp Hackert, German painter
- Gavin Hamilton, artist and antiquarian, painter and archaeologist, in Genzano and Lanuvio (18th century)
- James Duffield Harding in Tourist in Italy
- John Henry Henshall watercolor painter
- Richard Colt Hoare in A classical tour through Italy and Sicily
- Ellis Cornelia Knight, writer and painter in Description of Latium or La Campagna di Roma
- Edward Lear painter and lithographer
- William Leighton Leitch watercolor painter in Lanuvio
- Charles H. Poingdestre painter
- John Singer Sargent, painter in Villa Torlonia – Frascati
- Stendhal, writer, in Albano Laziale, Chroniques italiennes (1836–1839): L'Abbesse de Castro
- J. M. W. Turner, RA, British painter
- Georgina E. Troutbeck, Rambles in Rome – London – ed. Mills & Boon – 1914
- Richard Voss, German dramatist and novelist
- Clara Louisa Wells in The Alban Hills ed. 1878

== Panorama ==
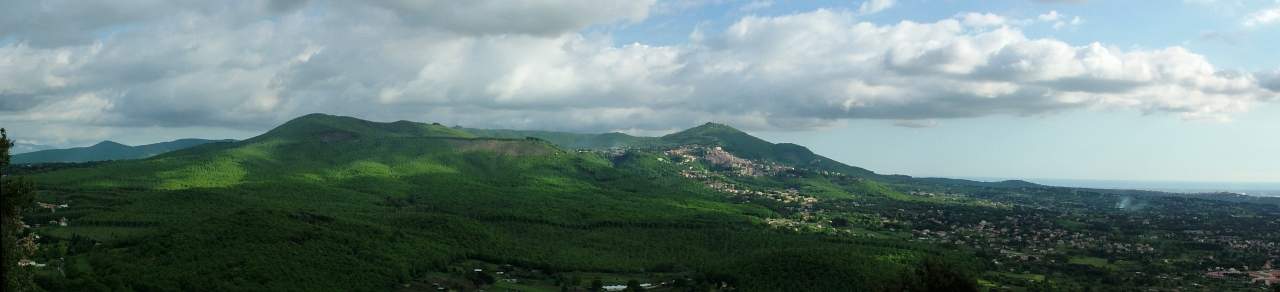
The Alban Hills.

== See also ==
- List of volcanoes in Italy
