= Dick Herrick =

Richard William Herrick (3 December 1913 - 5 May 1981) was an Anglican priest. He was educated at King Edward VI School Retford and Leeds University and was initially a civil servant. He was ordained after a period of study at the College of the Resurrection, Mirfield in 1940. He held curacies at Duston and Portsea, Portsmouth before being appointed Vicar of St Michael's, Northampton in 1947, a post he held for a decade. He was then a Canon Residentiary of Chelmsford Cathedral until 1978 when he was appointed Provost of Chelmsford. He died in post.

== Notes ==
Religious titles
Preceded by Hilary Martin Connop Price	Provost of Chelmsford; 1978 – 1981	Succeeded by John Henry Moses
