= Robert Ambrose =

Robert Ambrose may refer to:

- Robert Ambrose (composer) (1824–1908), Canadian organist and composer
- Robert Ambrose (politician) (1855–1940), Irish politician
