= Jessica Martin =

Jessica Martin may refer to:

- Jessica Martin (actor) (born 1962), British actor
- Jessica Martin (priest) (born 1963), British Anglican priest
- Jess Martin (born 1992), British runner
