= Dean of Chelmsford =

Church of England senior clergy member

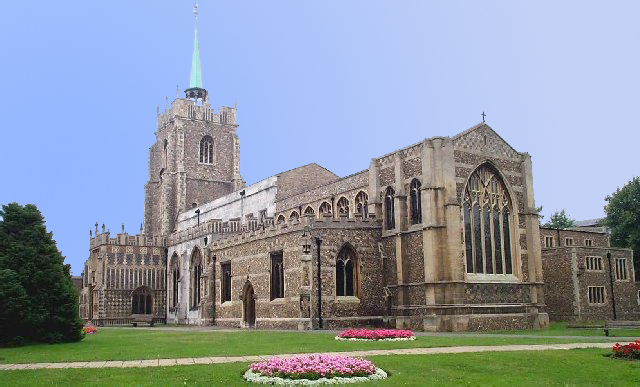
Chelmsford Cathedral

The Dean of Chelmsford is the head (primus inter pares – first among equals) and chair of the Cathedral Chapter, the governing body of Chelmsford Cathedral, the Cathedral Church of St Mary the Virgin, St Peter and St Cedd. Before 2000 the post was designated as a provost, which was then the equivalent of a dean at most English cathedrals. The cathedral is the mother church of the Diocese of Chelmsford and seat of the Bishop of Chelmsford. The Dean of Chelmsford is also responsible for the Chapel of St Peter-on-the-Wall at Bradwell-on-Sea, founded by St Cedd, among the oldest church buildings in regular use in England.

The current dean is Jessica Martin, since her institution on 5 January 2025.

== List of provosts and deans ==
=== Provosts ===
- 1929–1949: William Morrow
- 1949-1951: Charles Waller
- 1951–1966: Eric Gordon
- 1966–1977: Connop Price
- 1978–1981: Dick Herrick
- 1982–1996: John Moses
- 1997–2000: Peter Judd (became Dean)

=== Deans ===
- 2000–2013: Peter Judd (was Provost)
- 2013–2014: Ivor Moody, Vice Dean (acting)
- 2014–2023: Nicholas Henshall
- 2023–2025: Paul Kennington (acting)
- 2025–present: Jessica Martin
