= Margon =

Margon may refer to the following places in France:

- Margon, Eure-et-Loir, a commune in the Eure-et-Loir department
- Margon, Hérault, a commune in the Hérault department
- Margon (surname), a family name
