= Charles Waller (provost) =

Charles Kempson Waller (22 September 1891 – 16 January 1951) was Provost of Chelmsford from 1949 until his death.

Waller was educated at Felsted School, St John's College Oxford and Wells Theological College. He was ordained Deacon in 1914; and Priest in 1915. After curacies in Barking, Kensington and Fleet he was Priest in charge of St Martin's, Dagenham from 1925 to 1929. He then held incumbencies in Romford, Hornchurch and Wanstead before his Cathedral appointment.

Religious titles
Preceded by William Morrow	Provost of Chelmsford; 1949–1951	Succeeded by Eric Gordon
