= Margesson =

Margesson is a surname. Notable people with the surname include:

- Peter Somerset Margesson Judd DL (born 1949), the former Dean of Chelmsford
- David Margesson, 1st Viscount Margesson PC (1890–1965), British Conservative politician
- Viscount Margesson, a title in the Peerage of the United Kingdom

== See also ==
- Margon (disambiguation)
- Marson
- Masson (disambiguation)
