= Eric Gordon (bishop) =

British bishop (1905–1992)

The Right Reverend George Gordon
- Bishop of Sodor and Man
- Diocese: Diocese of Sodor and Man
- In office: 1966–1974
- Predecessor: Benjamin Pollard
- Successor: Vernon Nicholls

Orders
- Ordination: 1929

Personal details
- Born: 29 July 1905
- Died: 5 June 1992 (aged 86)
- Denomination: Anglican
- Education: St Olave's Grammar School; St Catharine's College, Cambridge

George Eric Gordon (29 July 1905– 6 June 1992) was an Anglican bishop in the 20th century.

He was born on 29 July 1905 and educated at St Olave's Grammar School and the St Catharine's College, Cambridge. Ordained in 1929 he began his career with a curacy at Holy Trinity, Leicester, after which he was Vice-Principal of Bishop Wilson College, Isle of Man. In 1935 he became Chaplain to William Stanton Jones, Bishop of Sodor and Man. In 1942 he became Rector of Kersal then Rural Dean of Middleton. From 1951 to 1966 he was Provost of Chelmsford Cathedral and Rector of Chelmsford when he was ordained to the episcopate as the Bishop of Sodor and Man, a post he held for eight years.

In 1974 he retired to Eynsham in Oxfordshire. He died on 6 June 1992.

Religious titles
Preceded by Charles Waller	Provost of Chelmsford; 1951–1966	Succeeded by Connop Price
Preceded by Benjamin Pollard	Bishop of Sodor and Man; 1966–1974	Succeeded by Vernon Nicholls
