= William Morrow (priest) =

English Anglican priest (1869–1950)

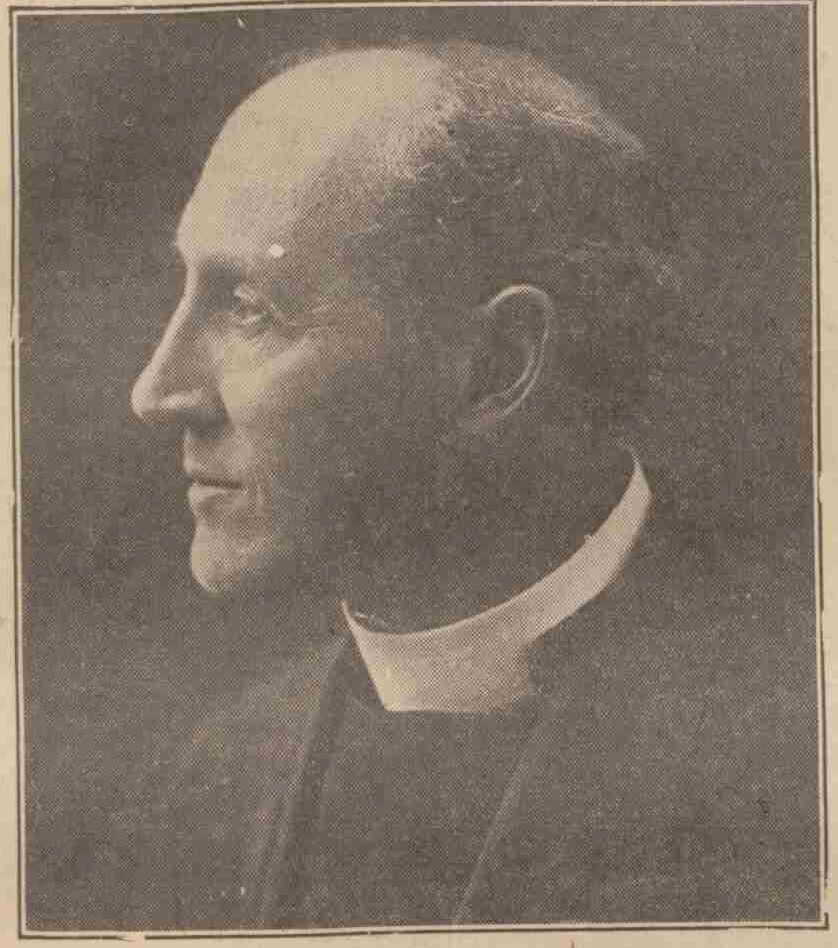
Canon William Morrow at the time of his inauguration as Chelmsford's First Provost July 1935

William Edward Reginald Morrow (5 March 1869 – 11 February 1950) was an eminent Anglican priest in the 20th century. He was educated at Trinity College, Dublin and ordained in 1894 for the Curacy of West Ham Parish Church, where he remained as Senior Curate until 1904. After this he held incumbencies at North Woolwich, All Saints Forest Gate, Clifton, Bristol and Wandsworth before his appointment as the inaugural Provost of Chelmsford.

In 1918 he married Lucy Matilda Watney, the eldest daughter of the brewer, Norman Watney of Westerham, Kent, and they had no children. Lucy died on 2 January 1923.

== Notes ==
Religious titles
New title	Provost of Chelmsford; 1929 – 1949	Succeeded by Charles Waller
