= Nicholas Henshall =

British Anglican priest and author (born 1962)

The Reverend Nicholas Henshall
- Dean of Chelmsford
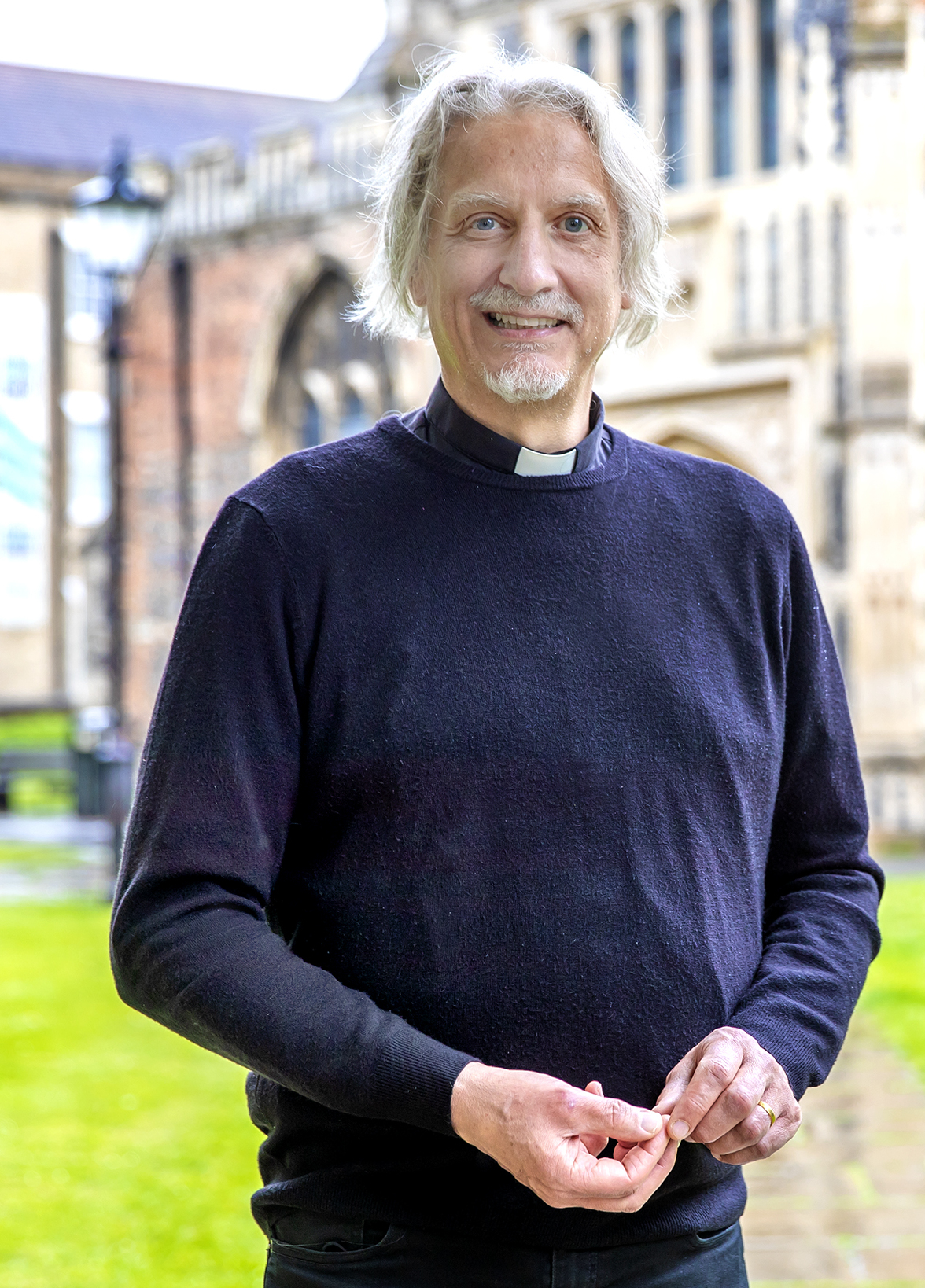
- Henshall in 2021
- Church: Church of England
- Diocese: Diocese of Chelmsford
- In office: 2014 to 2023
- Other post: Vicar of New Groombridge (2023–present)

Orders
- Ordination: 1988 (deacon); 1989 (priest)

Personal details
- Born: Nicholas James Henshall; 6 April 1962 (age 64) Mossley, Greater Manchester, England
- Denomination: Anglicanism

Nicholas James Henshall (born 6 April 1962) is a British Anglican priest and author, who served as Dean of Chelmsford from 2014 until 2023.

== Early life and education ==
Henshall was born on 6 April 1962 in Mossley, England. He is the son of Michael Henshall, long-serving Bishop of Warrington. He was educated at Manchester Grammar School; it was an all-boys direct grant grammar school when he joined, later becoming an independent school. He spent a gap year at the British School at Athens, before studying Literae Humaniores (classics) at Wadham College, Oxford. He graduated from the University of Oxford with a Bachelor of Arts (BA) degree; as per tradition 1984, his BA was promoted to a Master of Arts (MA Oxon) degree in 1988. From 1985 to 1988, he studied theology and trained for ordination at Ripon College Cuddesdon.

== Ordained ministry ==
Henshall was ordained in the Church of England as a deacon in 1988 and as a priest in 1989. After a curacy at, St Mary, Blyth he was Vicar of St Margaret, Scotswood from 1992 to 2002; both parishes are in the Diocese of Newcastle. He then became canon precentor of Derby Cathedral, serving in the role for six years. He returned to parish ministry and was vicar of Christ Church, Harrogate in the Diocese of Ripon and Leeds from 2008 to 2014. He also served as acting Archdeacon of Richmond from 2013 to 2014.

In November 2013, Henshall was announced as the next Dean of Chelmsford, head (primus inter pares – first among equals) of the chapter of Chelmsford Cathedral in the Diocese of Chelmsford. He was installed as dean at Chelmsford Cathedral during a service on 2 February 2014. In November 2022, he announced his intention to step down as dean the following year.

Henshall resigned the Deanery in February 2023 to return to parish ministry. On 23 February 2023, he was licensed as vicar of New Groombridge in the Diocese of Chichester.

== Personal life ==
In 1991, Henshall married Christine. Together they have three children: two daughters and one son.

== Publications ==
- Chapter on marriage and priesthood in Priests in a People’s Church ed George Guiver (SPCK 2001)
- 2008 – 2018: a series of 35 articles on pastoral and practical theology in The Tablet
- Focusses of Prophecy? Chapter in the book Holy Ground, ed Stephen Platten (2017 Sacristy Press)
- Contributing editor of the second edition of “Dear Nicholas” by Michael Henshall (2019 Sacristy Press)

Church of England titles
| Preceded by Janet Henderson as archdeacon | acting Archdeacon of Richmond; 1 February 2013 – 2 February 2014 | Succeeded by Paul Slater as acting archdeacon |
| Preceded by Peter Judd | Dean of Chelmsford; 2 February 2014 – 23 February 2023 | Succeeded by Jessica Martin |
