= Arcisses =

- Commune
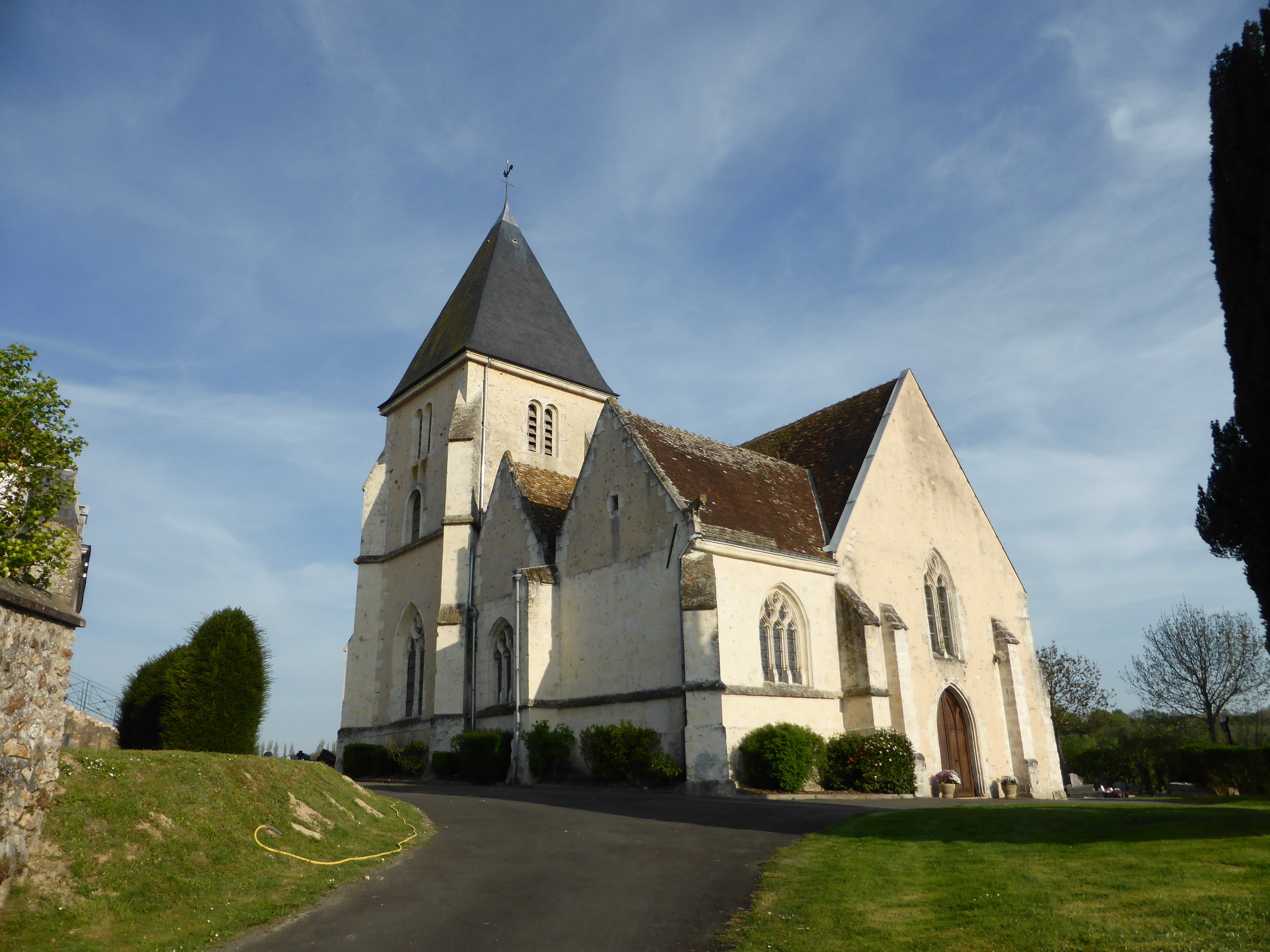
- The church in Margon
- Location of Arcisses
- Location within France Location within Centre-Val de Loire
- Coordinates: 48°20′00″N 0°50′00″E
- Country: France
- Region: Centre-Val de Loire
- Department: Eure-et-Loir
- Arrondissement: Nogent-le-Rotrou
- Canton: Nogent-le-Rotrou
- Intercommunality: Perche

Government
  - Mayor (2020–2026): Stéphane Courpotin
- Area^{1}: 45.43 km^{2} (17.54 sq mi)
- Highest elevation: 281 m (922 ft)
- Lowest elevation: 103 m (338 ft)
- Population (2023): 2,197
  - Density: 48.36/km^{2} (125.3/sq mi)
- Time zone: UTC+01:00 (CET)
  - Summer (DST): UTC+02:00 (CEST)
- INSEE/Postal code: 28236 /28400
- ^{1} French Land Register data, which excludes lakes, ponds, glaciers > 1 km^{2} (0.386 sq mi or 247 acres) and river estuaries.

Arcisses (French pronunciation: [aʁsis]) is a commune in the Eure-et-Loir department in northern France. It was established on 1 January 2019 by merger of the former communes of Margon (the seat), Brunelles and Coudreceau.

== Population ==
Population data refer to the commune in its geography as of January 2025.

Historical population
Year	Pop.	±% p.a.
1968	1,353	—
1975	1,501	+1.49%
1982	1,713	+1.91%
1990	1,997	+1.94%
1999	2,117	+0.65%
2007	2,208	+0.53%
2012	2,274	+0.59%
2017	2,204	−0.62%
2023	2,197	−0.05%
Source: INSEE

== See also ==
- Communes of the Eure-et-Loir department
