= Robert Ambrose (composer) =

Robert Steele Ambrose (March 7, 1824 – March 31, 1908) was a British-Canadian organist and composer. He was notable for his evangelical music compositions.

== Life ==
Ambrose was born on March 7, 1824, to Charles Ambrose and Sophia Stoneham in Chelmsford, England. Robert's father was the organist at Chelmsford Cathedral, where Robert most likely received his early musical training. The family emigrated to Upper Canada in 1837, where Charles purchased a farm. However, lacking the experience to do work on the land, Charles moved to Hamilton, Ontario, in 1845, leaving Robert to work the land himself. Robert made it clear that he did not like farming as it damaged his hands, interfering with his musical abilities.

In 1847, the young Ambrose left the farm to join his brother in Kingston, Ontario, teaching music. It is thought that around 1857-1858 Ambrose served as the organist of St. George's Church. In 1862, Ambrose led the choral service at the consecration of John Travers Lewis. In 1863, Ambrose moved to Hamilton to take up a position as organist and choir director for the Church of the Ascension. The very next year, he was appointed the musical director of what is now Hamilton Ladies College, leaving that position in 1889. In 1891, Ambrose served as the president of the Canadian Society of Musicians.

Ambrose was also an accomplished composer. In 1876, Ambrose's composition "One Sweetly Solemn Thought" was published, the lyrics having been written by Phoebe Cary. It was adopted for Moody and Sankey's evangelical tours to great success. One account states that upon hearing a hummed version of the hymn, a gambler immediately set down his cards and became a reformed Christian. The song was one of the most popular songs composed by a Canadian of the 19th century.

By the time of his death on March 31, 1908, Ambrose had composed 80 songs, 14 part-songs and 25 instrumental pieces. His son Paul Ambrose was a notable organist, teacher, and composer.
