= Michael Henshall =

The Rt Revd Michael Henshall
- Bishop of Warrington
- Diocese: Diocese of Liverpool
- In office: 1976–1996
- Predecessor: John Bickersteth
- Successor: John Packer
- Other post: Honorary assistant bishop in York (1999–2017)

Orders
- Ordination: 1956 (deacon); 1957 (priest)
- Consecration: 1976

Personal details
- Born: 29 February 1928
- Died: 7 February 2017 (aged 88)
- Denomination: Anglican
- Spouse: Ann Stephenson
- Children: 2 sons; 1 daughter
- Education: St Chad's College

Michael Henshall (29 February 1928 – 7 February 2017) was a long serving Suffragan Bishop of Warrington.

Henshall was educated at Manchester Grammar School and St Chad's College, Durham. He was ordained in 1957 and began his career with a curacy in Bridlington before Incumbencies at Micklehurst and Altrincham. From there he ascended to the Episcopate of Warrington a post he held for 20 years, retiring in 1996.

His son, Nicholas Henshall, was Dean of Chelmsford from 2014 to 2023.

He died on 7 February 2017 at the age of 88.

Church of England titles
Preceded by John Bickersteth	Bishop of Warrington; 1976–1996	Succeeded by John Packer
