= Paul Ambrose =

Canadian organist, conductor and composer (1868 - 1941)

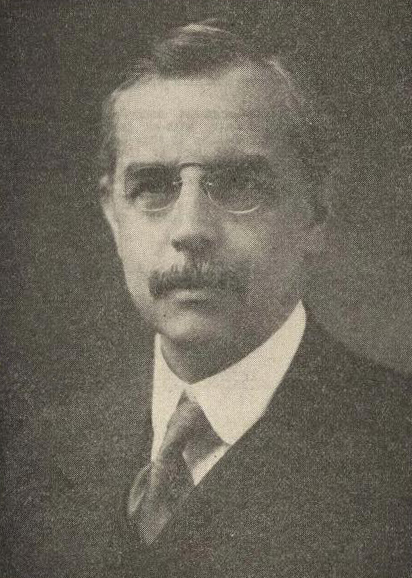

Background information
- Born: October 11, 1868; Hamilton, Ontario, Canada
- Origin: Canada
- Died: July 1, 1941 (aged 72) Hamilton, Ontario, Canada
- Genres: Classical, church Music
- Occupation(s): Conductor, composer, music Educator
- Instrument(s): Organ, piano
- Years active: c. 1886–1939

Paul Ambrose (11 October 1868 – 1 July 1941) was a Canadian organist, conductor, composer, and music educator who was primarily active in the United States. His compositional output includes more than 200 songs, choral pieces, and works for solo piano and organ. He is particularly remembered for his anthems, which have been performed widely in North America. Some of his better-known works include the anthems Saviour, Breathe an Evening Blessing, O Little Town of Bethlehem, and Come unto Me; and the song Rose-Bud.

== Life and career ==
Born in Hamilton, Ontario, Ambrose was the son of composer and organist Robert Ambrose and the grandson of organist Charles Ambrose. His cousin, pianist Ellen Ambrose, founded the Duet Club of Hamilton in 1889. He began his musical training in the piano and the organ as a young child with his father.

In 1886, at the age of 18, Ambrose moved to New York City to assume the post of organist-choirmaster at Madison Ave Methodist Episcopal Church where he remained for nearly 5 years. While in New York he pursued further musical studies with Dudley Buck (orchestration), Kate Sara Chittenden (piano), Bruno Oscar Klein (composition), and Albert Ross Parsons (piano). He later taught music history at the American Institute of Applied Music in New York in the early years of the 20th century.

In 1890 Ambrose moved to Trenton, New Jersey to become the organist-choirmaster at St James Methodist Episcopal Church, a post he held through 1917. In 1904 he became music director at the New Jersey State Normal School (now The College of New Jersey), where he remained until his retirement in 1934. He notably served four terms as president of the National Association of Organists while living in the United States.

After his retirement, Ambrose lived the rest of his life in Hamilton, where he served as guest organist at the Christ Church Cathedral. In 1939 he was elected president of the Royal Canadian College of Organists. He died in Hamilton in 1941 at the age of 72.
