= Brunelles =

- Part of Arcisses
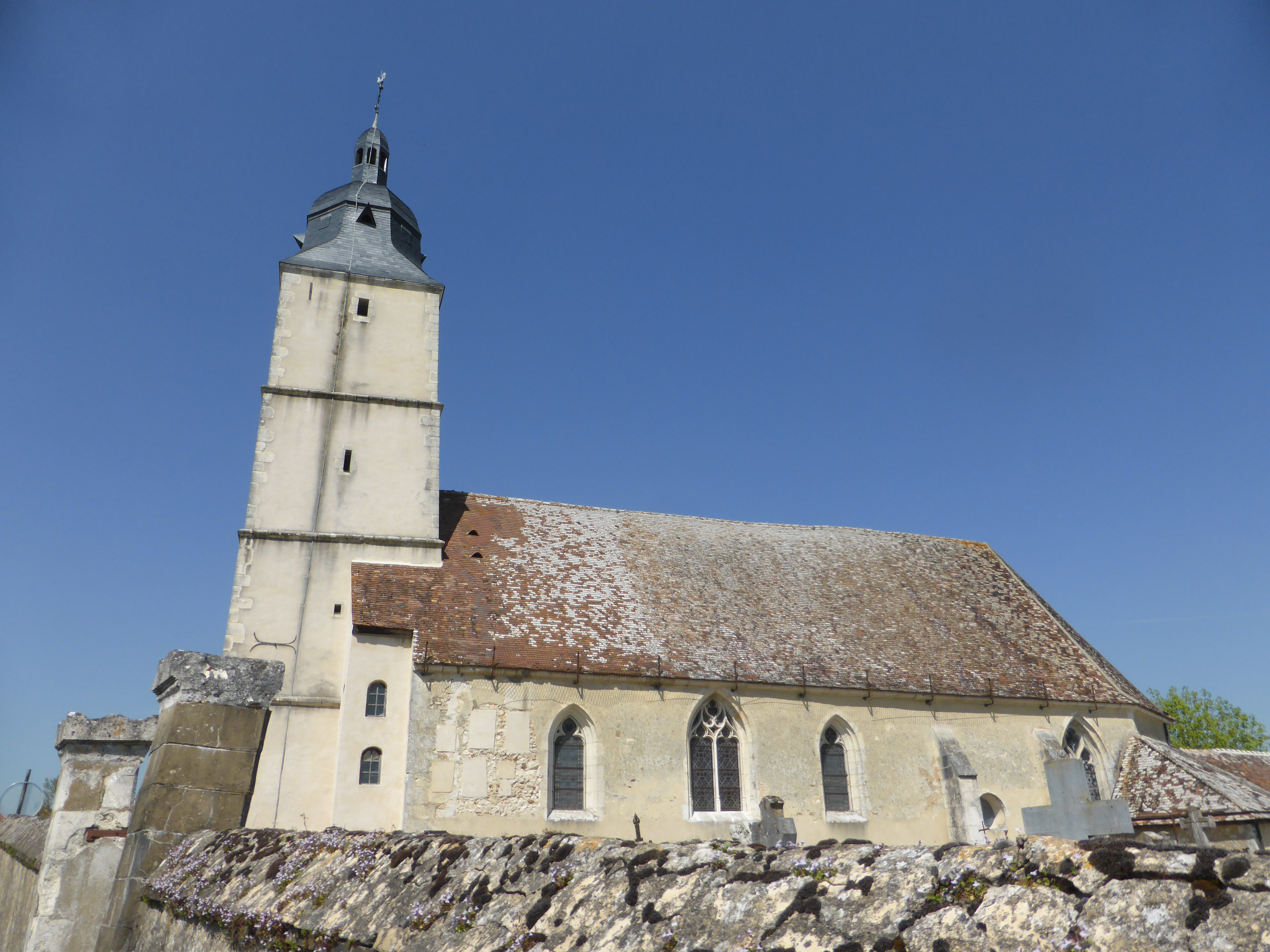

- Coat of arms
- Location of Brunelles
- Location within France Location within Centre-Val de Loire
- Coordinates: 48°19′30″N 0°53′41″E
- Country: France
- Region: Centre-Val de Loire
- Department: Eure-et-Loir
- Arrondissement: Nogent-le-Rotrou
- Canton: Nogent-le-Rotrou
- Commune: Arcisses
- Area^{1}: 19.99 km^{2} (7.72 sq mi)
- Elevation: 187 m (614 ft)
- Highest elevation: 281 m (922 ft)
- Lowest elevation: 121 m (397 ft)
- Population (2023): 507
  - Density: 25.4/km^{2} (65.7/sq mi)
- Time zone: UTC+01:00 (CET)
  - Summer (DST): UTC+02:00 (CEST)
- Postal code: 28400
- ^{1} French Land Register data, which excludes lakes, ponds, glaciers > 1 km^{2} (0.386 sq mi or 247 acres) and river estuaries.

Brunelles (French pronunciation: [bʁynɛl]) is a former commune in the Eure-et-Loir department in northern France. On 1 January 2019, it was merged into the new commune Arcisses.

== See also ==
- Communes of the Eure-et-Loir department
