= Margison =

Margison is a surname. Notable people with the surname include:

- Richard Margison (born 1953), Canadian operatic tenor

== See also ==
- Margeson
