= Charles Ambrose =

English musician

Charles Ambrose (1791 – 17 February 1856) was an English organist, composer, choir director, and music educator who was active in his native country during his early career and later in Canada. Ambrose was the organist-choirmaster at Chelmsford Cathedral during the 1820s and 1830s.

== Early life ==
Ambrose was born in England, where he trained as an organist.

== Career ==
In 1837 he emigrated to Canada where he settled with his wife Sophia and his children on a farm just outside Guelph, Ontario. He was appointed organist-choirmaster at Christ Church Cathedral in Hamilton in 1845, a position he held up until his death 11 years later. He also actively taught the piano and organ privately throughout his career.

Ambrose' compositional output was small, consisting of a few sacred works and pieces for solo organ and piano. His most notable work is Three Grand Sonatas for piano which was published in 1825; a copy of which is held in the collection at the Library and Archives Canada.

Ambrose died in Hamilton, Ontario in 1856 at the age of 65. He was the father and teacher of composer and organist Robert Ambrose and the grandfather of composer and organist Paul Ambrose.
