= Vernon Nicholls =

British Anglican clergyman

Styles of Vernon Nicholls
- Reference style: The Right Reverend
- Spoken style: My Lord
- Religious style: Bishop

The Right Reverend Vernon Nicholls
- Bishop of Sodor and Man
- Diocese: Diocese of Sodor and Man
- In office: 1974–1983
- Predecessor: George Eric Gordon
- Successor: Arthur Henry Attwell

Orders
- Ordination: 1941

Personal details
- Born: Vernon Sampson Nicholls; 3 September 1917 Truro, Cornwall, England
- Died: 2 February 1996 (aged 78) Stratford-upon-Avon, Warwickshire, England
- Denomination: Anglican
- Education: Truro School
- Alma mater: Durham University

Vernon Sampson Nicholls (3 September 1917– 2 February 1996) was an Anglican clergyman who served in the Church of England as the Bishop of Sodor and Man from 1974 to 1983.

== Birth and education ==
He was born in Truro on 3 September 1917 and educated at Truro School and Durham University.

== Church career ==
He studied for ordination at Clifton Theological College, was ordained in 1941, and held Curacies at Bedminster Down, Bristol, and at Liskeard in Cornwall. He was a temporary Chaplain to the Forces from 1944 to 1946. Later he was Vicar of Meopham then Vicar of St. Matthew's Walsall and Rural Dean.

From 1967 to 1974 he was Archdeacon of Birmingham when he was elevated to the Episcopate. From 1980 he was also Dean of the newly created Peel Cathedral — he was installed as such in the service where it was raised to cathedral status, on All Saints' Day (1 November 1980). He died on 2 February 1996 in Stratford-on-Avon.

== Private life ==
Nicholls was a very active Freemason under the United Grand Lodge of England. Initiated in Philbrick Lodge No 2255 (Essex), most of his masonic memberships were in Warwickshire, where he rose in seniority, eventually becoming Provincial Grand Master of the county, and leader of its 181 lodges from 1985 to 1992, following his retirement from church life.

== Notes ==
Religious titles
Preceded by George Eric Gordon	Bishop of Sodor and Man; 1974–1983	Succeeded by Arthur Henry Attwell
