= Connop Price =

British Anglican priest

Hilary Martin Connop Price (1912–1998) was an eminent Anglican priest in the 20th century.

He was educated at Cheltenham College and Queens' College, Cambridge and ordained in 1937. After this he was Curate at St Peter's, Hersham and then Senior Chaplain at Portsmouth Cathedral. During the war he was a Chaplain in the RAFVR. When peace returned he was Vicar of St Gabriel's, Bishopwearmouth and then Rural Dean of Newcastle-under-Lyme. In 1966 he became Provost of Chelmsford, a post he held for 11 years.

== Notes ==
Religious titles
Preceded by George Eric Gordon	Provost of Chelmsford; 1966 – 1977	Succeeded by Richard William Herrick
