= Charles H. Poingdestre =

British painter

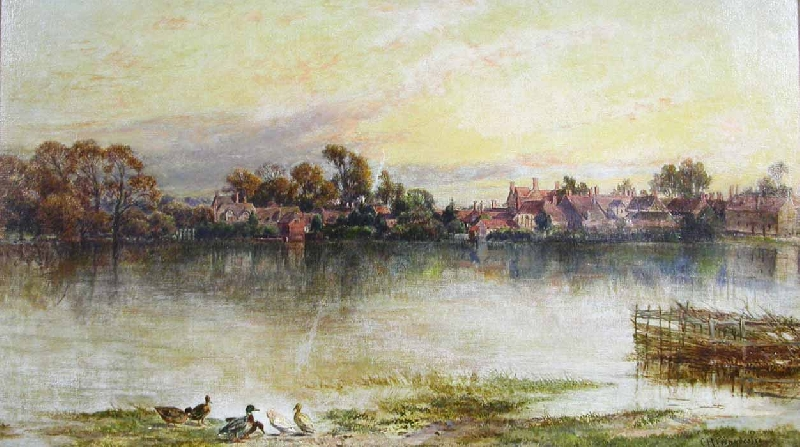
"River Scene with Buildings" oil on canvas.

Charles Henry Poingdestre (1825 in Jersey – 1905 in London) was a painter. He stayed in Rome 30 years where he opened a paint studio in Via dei Greci, n. 36. Some favourite subjects of his paintings were the "Campagna Romana" and the "Paludi Pontine".

Sixteen of his paintings are in UK public collections, including National Museums Liverpool, Nuneaton Art Gallery and Jersey Heritage.
