= Margon (surname) =

Margon is a surname. Notable people with the surname include:

- Mitja Margon (born 1971), Slovene sailor
