= Margeson =

Margeson is a surname. Notable people with the surname include:

- Jessica Margeson, American politician
- Joseph Willis Margeson (1880–1925), Canadian educator, lawyer, and politician
- Matthew Margeson (born 1980), American composer, musician, and arranger of film, television, and video game scores
- Theodore E. Margeson, Canadian judge
