= D. Murugesan =

Indian judge

Darmar Murugesan is a retired Indian judge and a former Chief Justice of Delhi High Court. He has occupied many key posts in the Judiciary of India. He was elevated as a Judge of the Madras High Court from the Bar. He had formerly occupied the post of Member National Human Rights Commission of India.

== Early life and education ==
Murugesan was born on June 10, 1951, in Cumbum Pudupatti, Theni District, Tamil Nadu. In 1975, he completed his law degree at Madras Law College, where he was a Gold Medalist in Hindu law.

== Career ==
Murugesan enrolled as an Advocate in the Bar Council of India. His enrollment date in Bar Council of Tamil Nadu and Puduchery was August 27, 1975.

Murugesan was the Legal Advisor to the University of Madras from 1984 to 1987, and to the Corporation of Chennai from 1992 to June 1996. He then served as the Special Government Pleader for Education Department of Government of the State of Tamil Nadu from 1994 to 1996, and the Special Government Pleader for Writs from 1997 to 1998. He was appointed Government Pleader on 8 December 1998 and continued to be the Government Pleader till 2000. Murugesan was elevated as the Judge of Madras High Court on 2 March 2000, and appointed a Permanent Judge of Madras High Court on 13 June 2001.

=== Chief Justice ===
Murugesan was elevated as the Chief Justice of Delhi High Court with effect from 26 November 2012. He retired as Chief Justice of Delhi High Court on June 10, 2013.

During his tenure as Chief Justice of Delhi High Court, Murugesan held the Office from 26 November 2012 to 9 June 2013 as Pattern-in-Chief for the Delhi State Legal Service Authority.

=== Human Rights Commission ===
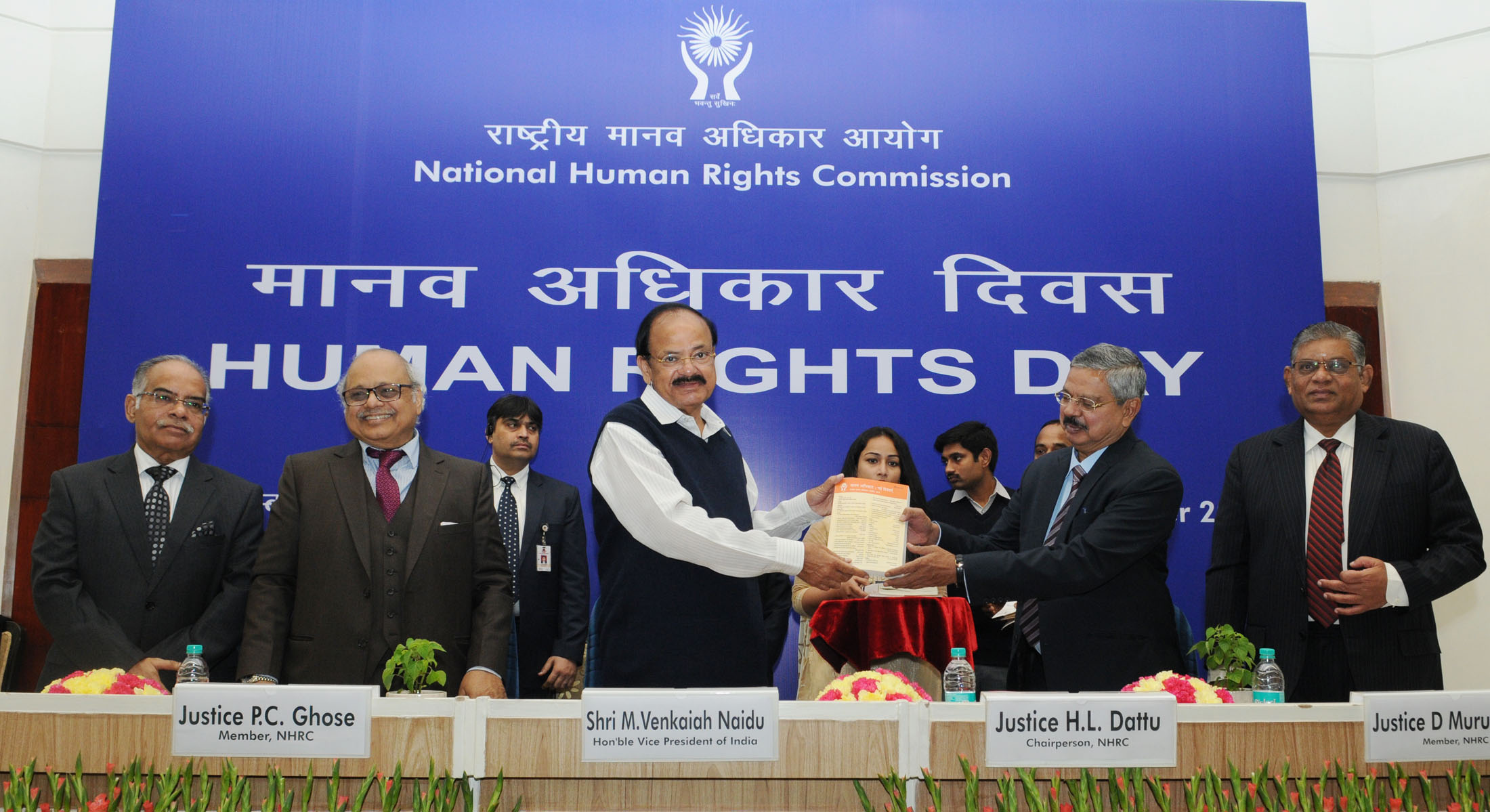
Vice President of India Venkaiah Naidu releasing the Publication on the Human Rights Day. H. L. Dattu, the Chief Justice of India is receiving the Publication. Justice D. Murugesan, Member Human Rights Commission of India, is on the extreme right in the Picture.

After his retirement as Chief Justice of Delhi High Court, Murugesan was appointed on 21 September 2013 as the Member of the National Human Rights Commission of India at New Delhi.

As the Member of the National Human Rights Commission, on March 11, 2015, he had attended the "Commonwealth Forum National Human Rights Institutions (CFNHRI) held in Geneva, Switzerland. The Conference went on from March 11, 2015 to March 13, 2015. He had also attended, as the Member of the National Human Rights Commission of India, the 28th Annual General Meeting of International Coordinating Committee of National Institutions for the Promotion and Protection of Human Rights (ICC). Murugesan had also attended the Consultation Meeting on August 16, 2015 in Dhaka on the Strategic Plan for the years 2016 to 2020.

As the Member of the National Human Rights Commission, Murugesan chaired the workshop on the "Elimination of Bonded Labour" and the Camp Sittings organized in various parts of India, for hearing of cases of "Atrocities against the Scheduled Caste and Scheduled Tribe communities" and the Issues relating to Bonded Labours. Murugesan retired from his service for the National Human Rights Commission on 20 September 2018.

=== Pay Grievance Redress Committee (PGRC), 2019 ===
Murugesan was appointed by the Supreme Court of India on 28 November 2019, in Civil Appeal No. 10029 of 2017 as the Chairman of the One Man Commission to fix the Pay differences of the Government Servants. Supreme Court of India has also ordered that, the affected Employees shall not be permitted to get the 7th Central Pay Commission scales on the basis of the higher scales till such time as a final decision is taken.

Accordingly, Pay Grievance Redress Committee was constituted under the Chairmanship of Justice D. Murugesan.

The Committee consists of, apart from the Chairman, two official Administrative Members and two co-opted Members recommended by the Chairman. The Committee has to examine all the representations received from all Associations, individual employees relating to differences in respect of pay structure ordered based on the recommendations of the earlier One Man Commission, 2010; G.O.Ms.No.71, Finance (Pay Cell) Department, dated:26 February 2011; and G.O.Ms.No.242, Finance (Pay Cell) Department, dated: 22 July 2013.

The Pay Grievances Redress Committee heard the grievances from 21 January 2020 to 20 March 2020. The Committee heard 243 Associations and 2397 individual employees over this period and concluded with new Recommendations. The Recommendations of the Grievance Redress Committee were accepted by the Government and further Orders were issued.

== Important cases ==
=== Rape Case records missing ===
Case records pertaining to a rape that took place at Connaught Place, New Delhi were missing from the court records and also from the police record. A public Interest Litigation Petition was filed before the Delhi High Court in this regard to pass suitable directions. Justice D. Murugesan and Justice V. K. Jain had heard the case and after receiving the report from the Saket District Judge, ordered the Court to reconstruct the records of the case.

=== SC and ST Community Certificate case ===
In a Larger Bench of the Madras High Court, consisting of Justice D. Murugesan, Justice R. Banumathi and Justice K. K. Sasitharan, Murugesan had passed the Judgment relating to the Power of the TNPSC. In that case relating to the verification by the Tamil Nadu Public Service Commission (TNPSC), on the genuineness of Community Certificates filed by the candidates belonging to the Scheduled Caste and Scheduled Tribes, urugesan held that the TNPSC has no power to verify the Certificates. It was held that the scrutiny of the genuineness of the Scheduled Caste certificates can be made only by District Level Vigilance Committee constituted by the State Government in terms of G.O. (2D) No.108, Adi Dravidar and Tribal Welfare Department, dated: 12 September 2007; The scrutiny of the genuineness of the Scheduled Tribe certificates can be made only by State Level Scrutiny Committee constituted by the State Government in terms of G.O. (2D) No.108, Adi Dravidar and Tribal Welfare Department, dated 12 September 2007; Such scrutiny of certificates, be it Scheduled Caste or Scheduled Tribe, cannot be made by the Tamil Nadu Public Service Commission (TNPSC).

== See Also ==
Delhi High Court
