= Margon, Eure-et-Loir =

Margon
- Part of Arcisses
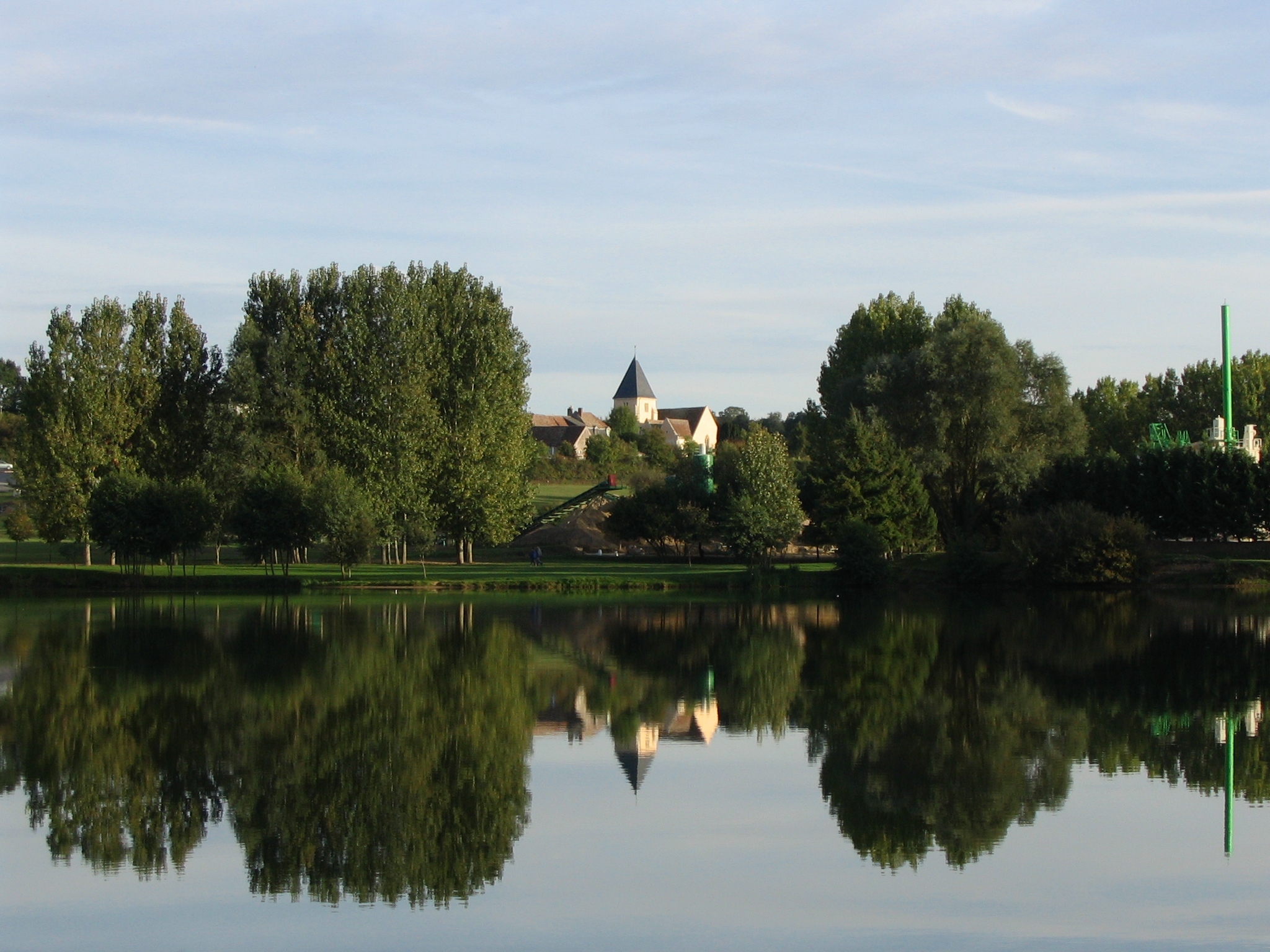
- Location of Margon
- Location within France Location within Centre-Val de Loire
- Coordinates: 48°20′00″N 0°50′00″E
- Country: France
- Region: Centre-Val de Loire
- Department: Eure-et-Loir
- Arrondissement: Nogent-le-Rotrou
- Canton: Nogent-le-Rotrou
- Commune: Arcisses
- Area^{1}: 12.13 km^{2} (4.68 sq mi)
- Elevation: 114 m (374 ft)
- Highest elevation: 185 m (607 ft)
- Lowest elevation: 103 m (338 ft)
- Population (2022): 1,223
  - Density: 100.8/km^{2} (261.1/sq mi)
- Time zone: UTC+01:00 (CET)
  - Summer (DST): UTC+02:00 (CEST)
- Postal code: 28400
- ^{1} French Land Register data, which excludes lakes, ponds, glaciers > 1 km^{2} (0.386 sq mi or 247 acres) and river estuaries.

Margon (French pronunciation: [maʁɡɔ̃]) is a former commune in the Eure-et-Loir department in northern France. On 1 January 2019, it was merged into the new commune Arcisses.

== Population ==
Historical population
Year	Pop.	±% p.a.
1962	600	—
1968	646	+1.24%
1975	815	+3.38%
1982	944	+2.12%
1990	1,154	+2.54%
1999	1,225	+0.67%
2006	1,240	+0.17%
2022	1,223	−0.09%
Source: EHESS and INSEE

== See also ==
- Communes of the Eure-et-Loir department
