= Theodore E. Margeson =

Tax Court of Canada
- Incumbent
- Assumed office July 5, 1990

Personal details
- Born: New Glasgow, Nova Scotia

Theodore E. Margeson (born in New Glasgow, Nova Scotia, Canada) is a judge who served on the Tax Court of Canada.
