= Peter Judd (priest) =

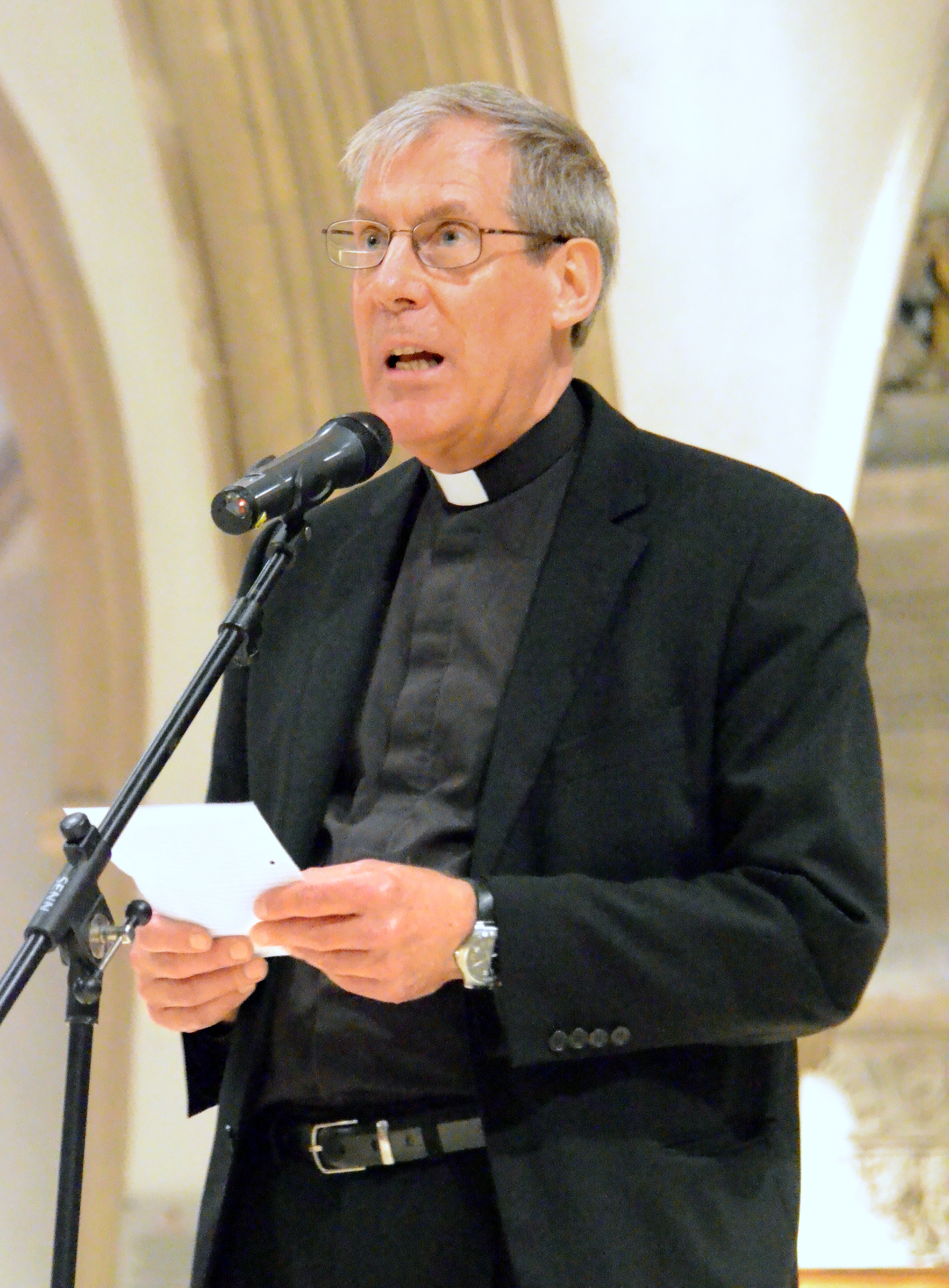
The Very Reverend Peter Judd

Peter Somerset Margesson Judd DL (born 20 February 1949) is a retired priest, having retired as Dean of Chelmsford on 6 October 2013.

Born in Calgary, Alberta, he was educated at Charterhouse and Trinity Hall, Cambridge and ordained after a period of study at Ripon College Cuddesdon in 1974. He began his ecclesiastical career as a Curate at St Philip with St Stephen, Salford after which he was Chaplain and Fellow at Clare College, Cambridge. He was Team Vicar of Hitcham and Dropmore from 1981 to 1988 and then Rural Dean of Cowley until he became Rector and Provost of Chelmsford Cathedral in 1997, and Dean in 2000.

Religious titles
Preceded by John Henry Moses	Dean of Chelmsford; 1997 – 2013	Succeeded by Nicholas Henshall
