= Peter Judd (cricketer) =

English cricketer

Personal information
- Full name: Peter Judd
- Born: 29 April 1938; Balham, London, England
- Died: 6 February 2025 (aged 86); Tooting, London, England
- Height: 1.88 m (6 ft 2 in)
- Batting: Right-handed
- Bowling: Right-arm off break

Domestic team information
- Years: Team
- 1960: Surrey and Surrey Second XI

Career statistics
Competition	First-class
Matches	1
Runs scored	–
Batting average	–
100s/50s	–/–
Top score	–
Balls bowled	60
Wickets	–
Bowling average	–
5 wickets in innings	–
10 wickets in match	–
Best bowling	–
Catches/stumpings	1/–
- Source: Cricinfo, 27 August 2012

Peter Judd (29 April 1938 – 6 February 2025) was an English cricketer. Peter Judd was a right-handed batsman who bowled right-arm off break. He was born in Balham, London.

Peter made a single first-class appearance for Surrey against Oxford University in 1960 at Woodbridge Road, Guildford. He wasn't required to bat during the match, while with the ball he bowled ten wicketless overs which conceded 14 runs, with the match ending in a Surrey victory by 4 wickets. This was his only major appearance for Surrey. Peter also played for Surrey Second XI team.
