= T. S. Murugesan Pillai =

T. S. Murugesan Pillai (1870–1930) was a Telugu writer, poet and translator who is known for translating Tamil classical works into Telugu.

== Personal life ==
Murugesan Pillai was born in Tiruchirappalli in 1870 but spent most of his life in Ettaiyapuram estate. He was a close friend of Subbarama Dikshitar.

== Works ==
In 1904, Murugesan Pillai made his mark by praising Subbarama Dikshitar's Sangitha Sampradaya Pradharshini and Venkateswara Ettappa, the then zamindar of Ettaiyapuram estate. In 1918, he wrote a Telugu biography of the Tamil poet Kambar titled Kambamahakavi Jeevitamu. In 1923, Murugesan Pillai published Nupuramahima, a Telugu prosaic translation of the Tamil epic Silappadhikaram.

In 1918, Murugesan Pillai published Dravidandhra Bhashala Anyonyasambandhamu a comparative grammar of Tamil and Telugu languages.
