= John Moses (priest) =

Anglican priest (1938–2024)

The Very Reverend John Moses KCVO
- Dean of St Paul's
- Church: Church of England
- Diocese: Diocese of London
- In office: November 1996 – 31 August 2006
- Predecessor: Eric Evans
- Successor: Graeme Knowles
- Other posts: Provost of Chelmsford; 1982–1996; Archdeacon of Southend; 1977–1982; John Macquarrie Professor of Anglican Theology at the Graduate Theological Foundation; 2013–2024

Orders
- Ordination: 1964

Personal details
- Born: 12 January 1938 Marylebone, London, England
- Died: 14 July 2024 (aged 86)
- Denomination: Anglican
- Education: University of Nottingham

John Henry Moses KCVO (12 January 1938 – 14 July 2024) was the Dean of St Paul's from November 1996 until his retirement on 31 August 2006.

Moses' last service as dean was a Sung Eucharist on 12 July 2006. It was attended by over 2,000 friends, family, colleagues and invited guests including the Duchess of Gloucester, Baroness Thatcher and the Lord Mayor of London.

== Early life ==
Moses was born in Marylebone, London on 12 January 1938. He was educated at Ealing County Grammar School for Boys, a state grammar school (now Ealing, Hammersmith and West London College) in West London, followed by the University of Nottingham and Trinity Hall, Cambridge. He then studied at Lincoln Theological College, where he was ordained in 1964.

== Career ==
Moses became an assistant curate of St Andrew's Bedford, then the rector of the Coventry East Team Ministry and the rural dean of Coventry East. In 1977 he was appointed the Archdeacon of Southend, also serving as the Bishop of Chelmsford's officer for industry and commerce, chairman of the diocesan retreat house and chairman of the diocesan advisory committee. In 1982 he became the Provost of Chelmsford before becoming Dean of St Paul's in 1996. He has published a number of books, including The Sacrifice of God (1992) and A Broad and Living Way (1995). In 1992, he was appointed the first rector of Anglia Ruskin University.

In 2013, Moses was appointed the John Macquarrie Professor of Anglican Theology at the Graduate Theological Foundation in Mishawaka, Indiana.

== Personal life ==
In 1964, Moses married Susan. Together they had three children.

Moses died on 14 July 2024, at the age of 86.

== Honours ==
In 1997 he was made an Honorary Doctor of the University by Anglia Ruskin University. In 2006, he was created a Knight Commander of the Royal Victorian Order (KCVO); as a clergyman, Moses did not receive the accolade and so only used the post-nominals and not the title of sir. Other honorable titles held by Moses include Brother of the Order of St. John and Officer of the Order of Istiqlal of the Hashemite Kingdom of Jordan.

== Styles ==
- Mr John Moses (1938–1964)
- The Revd John Moses (1964–1977)
- The Ven John Moses (1977–1982)
- The Very Revd John Moses (1982–1997)
- The Very Revd Dr John Moses (1997–2006)
- The Very Revd Dr John Moses KCVO (2006–2024)

== Writings ==
- The Sacrifice of God: A Holistic Theory of Atonement, Norwich: Canterbury Press, 1994 (ISBN 1853110566, ISBN 978-1-85311-056-6)
- A Broad and Living Way: Church and State -- A Continuing Establishment, Norwich: Canterbury Press, 1995 (ISBN 978-1853111129)
- The Desert: An Anthology for Lent, Morehouse Publishing, 1997 (ISBN 978-0819217288)
- One Equall Light: An Anthology of the Writings of John Donne (ed) Norwich: Canterbury Press, 2003 (ISBN 9780802827722)
- The Language of Love: Exploring Prayer: An Anthology, Canterbury Press, 2013 (ISBN 9781853117831)
