= Jessica Martin (priest) =

British Anglican priest

The Very Reverend Jessica Martin
- Dean of Chelmsford
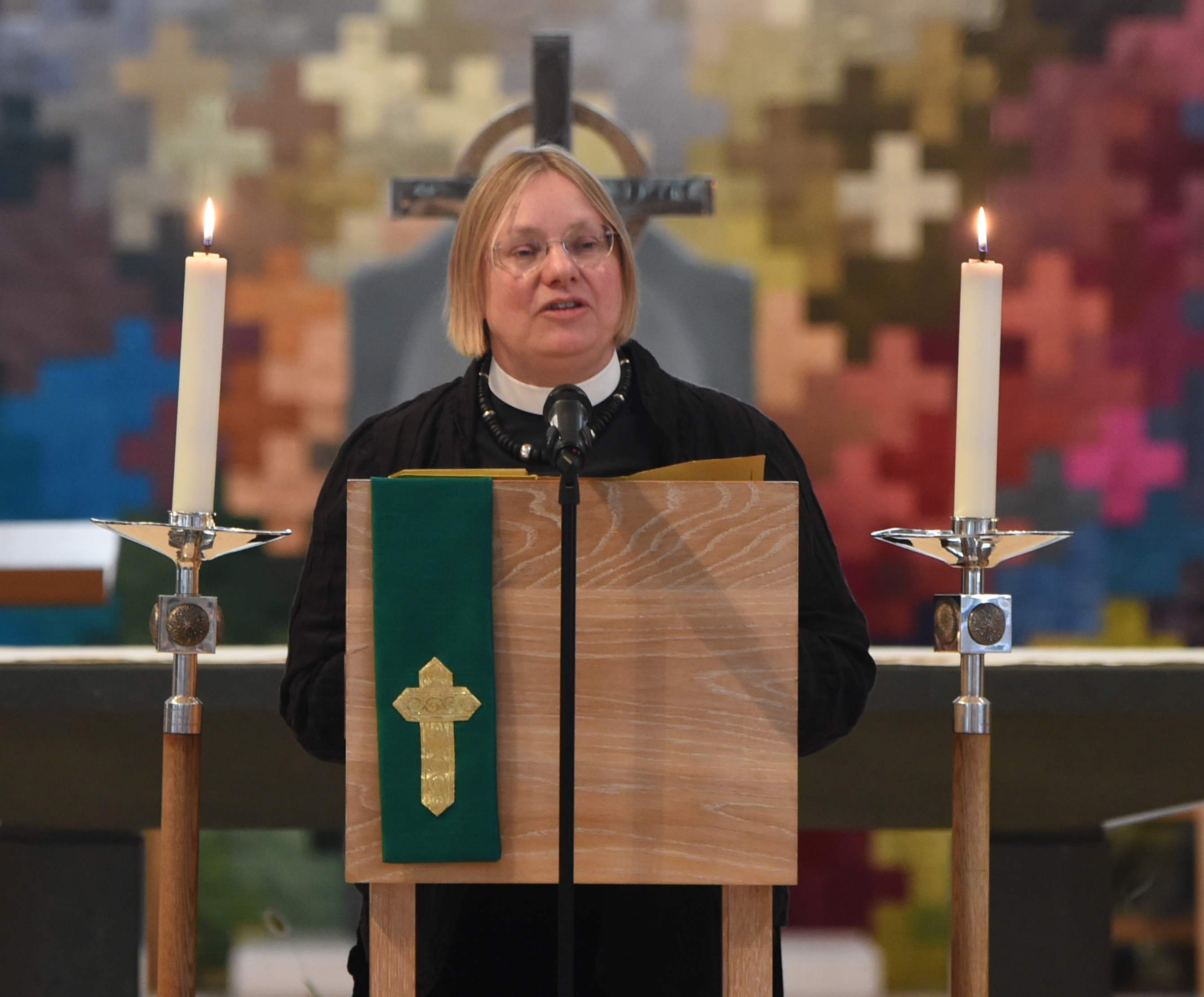
- Martin in 2025
- Church: Church of England
- Diocese: Chelmsford
- In office: January 2025 to present
- Predecessor: Nicholas Henshall

Orders
- Ordination: 2004 (priest)

Personal details
- Born: Jessica Heloise Martin; 8 April 1963 (age 63) Kingston-upon-Thames
- Denomination: Anglicanism
- Spouse: Francis Spufford
- Children: Two daughters
- Education: Trinity Hall, Cambridge

Jessica Heloise Martin (born 8 April 1963) is a British Anglican priest. Since 2025, she has served as Dean of Chelmsford.

== Life and career ==
Martin was born on 8 April 1963 in Kingston-upon-Thames. She attended Woking Girls' Grammar School, before studying at Trinity Hall, Cambridge, where she received her BA in 1986. She obtained a PhD in the Faculty of English at Cambridge in 1993, with a doctoral thesis titled "Izaak Walton and his precursors: a literary study of the emergence of the ecclesiastical Life". She was a postdoctoral fellow at Lucy Cavendish College, Cambridge between 1994 and 1998, and was College Lecturer in English and a Fellow of Trinity College, Cambridge from 1999 to 2010.

She was ordained in 2004, serving as a priest alongside her work as a lecturer, until in 2010 she became the vicar of Hinxton, Duxford and Ickleton in South Cambridgeshire, close to the Essex border. She also served on the Bishop of Ely's senior staff, contributing to the Church of England's reflections on sexuality, and became a canon of Ely Cathedral in 2016, with special responsibility for learning.

After her appointment as Dean of Chelmsford was announced on 28 June 2024, she was installed as Dean on 5 January 2025.

== Personal life ==
She is married to the author Francis Spufford, and has two daughters.

== Selected publications ==
- Martin, Jessica (1997). Izaak Walton: Selected Writings. Carcanet. ISBN 9781857543070.
- Martin, Jessica (2001). Walton's Lives: Conformist Commemorations and the Rise of Biography. Oxford University Press. ISBN 9780198270157.
- Martin, Jessica; Ryrie, Alec, eds. (2012). Private and Domestic Devotion in Early Modern Britain. Routledge. ISBN 9781409431312.
- Martin, Jessica (2020). Holiness and Desire. Canterbury Press Norwich. ISBN 9781786221261.
- Martin, Jessica; Coakley, Sarah, eds. (2017). For God's Sake: Re-Imagining Priesthood and Prayer in a Changing Church. Canterbury Press Norwich. ISBN 9781848258143.
- Martin, Jessica (2023). The Eucharist in Four Dimensions: The Meanings of Communion in Contemporary Culture. Canterbury Press Norwich. ISBN 9781786224729.

Church of England titles
Preceded by Nicholas Henshall	Dean of Chelmsford; 2025–	Incumbent
