= John Henry Henshall =

English painter

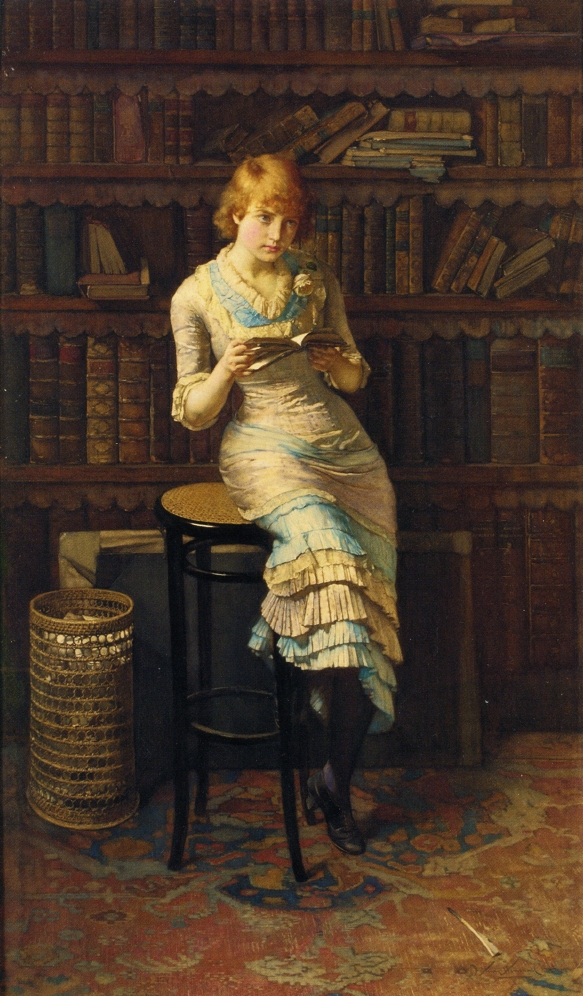
Thoughts mixed media painting by John Henry Henshall, 1883

John Henry Henshall, usually known as Henry Henshall RWS (1856 in Manchester – 18 November 1928 in Bosham) was a British watercolourist and etcher.

== Life ==
Henshall was born in Manchester. Leaving school at the age of sixteen, Henry – he preferred his second forename to that of John – attended the Manchester School of Art, where he was taught by William Jabez Muckley, who was a talented but demanding master. In March 1876 he travelled to London to join the South Kensington School of Art, but he remained there only one term, passing in the following June to the Royal Academy on the special recommendation of Edward Poynter. In 1880 he was awarded a Royal Academy silver medal for a Painting of a Head from the Life, almost certainly the fine watercolour An Egyptian Muleteer now in the collection of the Victoria and Albert Museum.

Although Henshall did paint some oils he was principally a watercolourist, being elected an Associate of the RWS in 1883, and becoming one of the Society's forty full members in 1897. He exhibited 171 pictures at the RWS and his diploma work, La Serenata, may be viewed at the Society's Bankside gallery. A favourite theme of Henshall's work is the contrast between the happy innocence of childhood, without cares, and the tribulations of old age. He was not afraid to tackle uncomfortable subjects and his honest, realistic pictures of ordinary life were quite unusual for painters in the Victorian era. In April 1912 the Leicester Galleries in London had an exhibition of Henshall's watercolours of Country Folk (catalogue No. 162).

Henshall died in Bosham, near Chichester, on 18 November 1928, aged 72 and leaving behind his wife, Elizabeth Henshall.
