= Chelmsford Cathedral =

Coordinates: 51.7355°N 0.4741°E

- Cathedral Church of St Mary the Virgin, St Peter and St Cedd
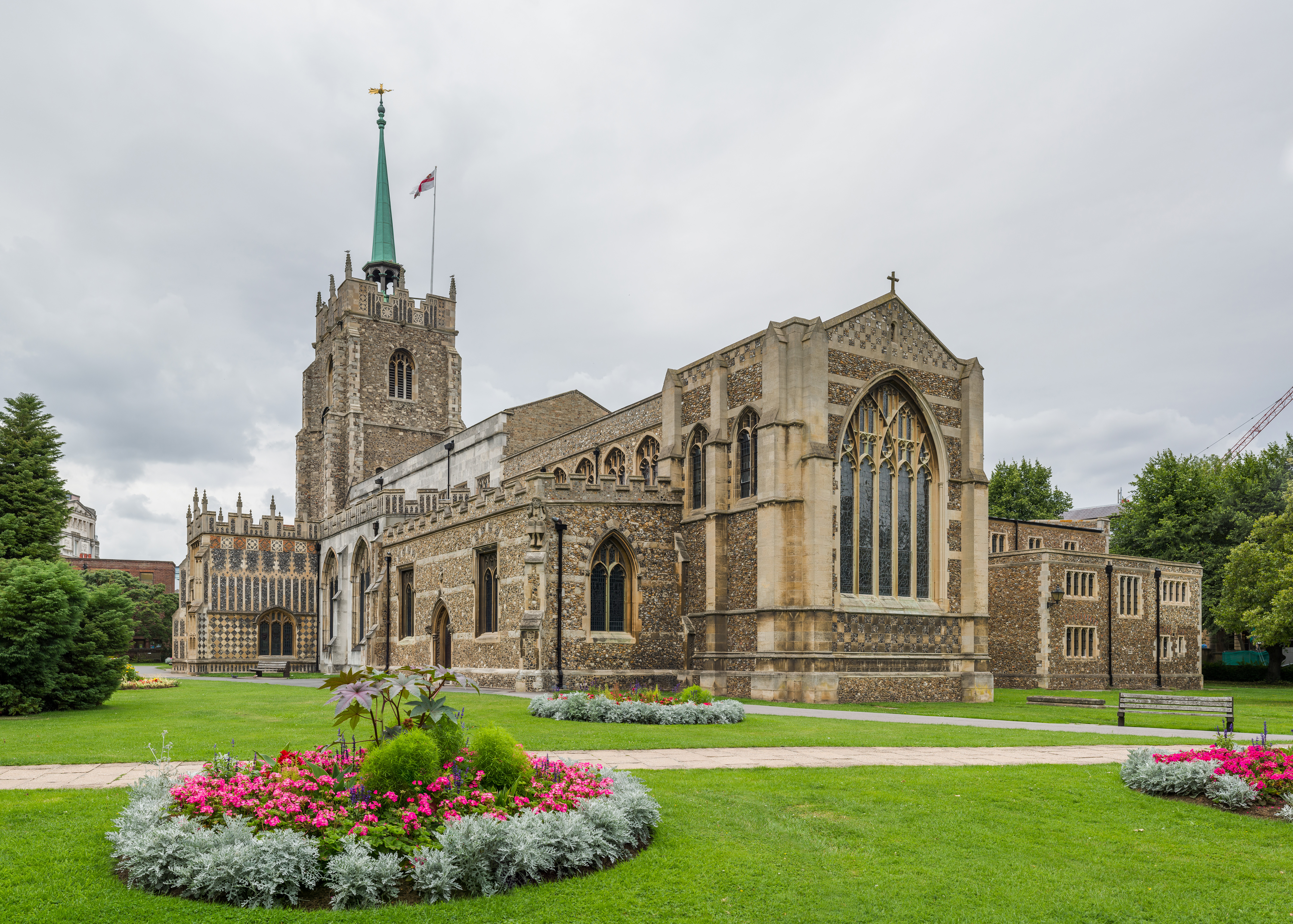
- Chelmsford Cathedral, July 2014

- Location within Essex
- OS grid reference: TL 70814 06948
- Location: Chelmsford, Essex
- Country: England
- Denomination: Church of England
- Previous denomination: Catholic Church
- Website: chelmsfordcathedral.org.uk

Architecture
- Style: Gothic
- Years built: c.1200 – c.1520

Administration
- Province: Canterbury
- Diocese: Chelmsford

Clergy
- Bishop: Guli Francis-Dehqani
- Dean: The Very Revd Dr Jessica Martin

Chelmsford Cathedral, formally titled the Cathedral Church of St Mary the Virgin, St Peter and St Cedd, is an Anglican cathedral in the city of Chelmsford, Essex, England, dedicated to St Mary the Virgin, St Peter and St Cedd. It became a cathedral when the Anglican Diocese of Chelmsford was created in 1914 and is the seat of the Bishop of Chelmsford.

== History ==
=== Parish church ===
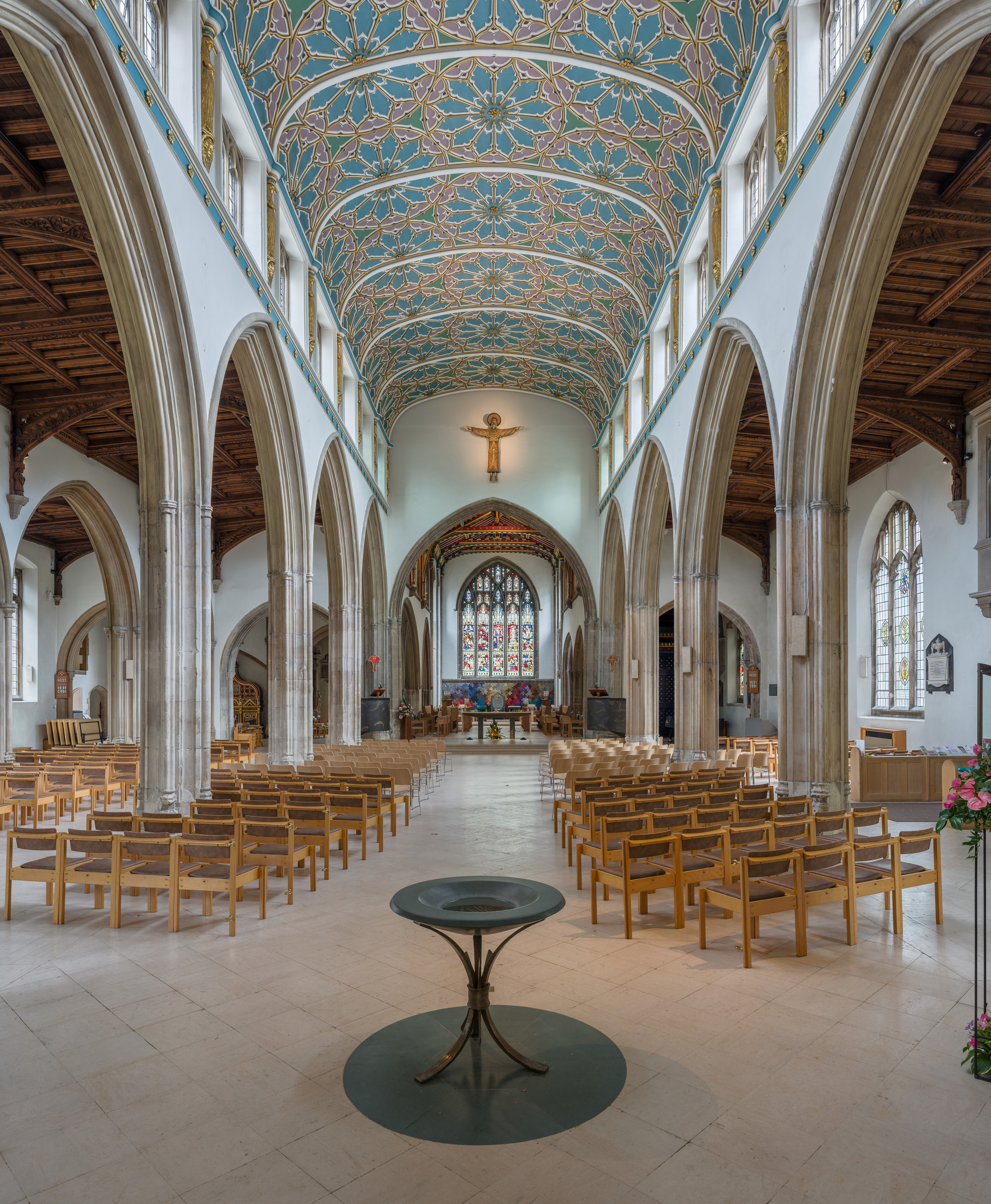
The nave

The church of St Mary the Virgin in Chelmsford was probably first built along with the town around 1200. It was rebuilt in the 15th and early 16th centuries (starting around 1520), with walls of flint rubble, stone and brick.

The church has a tower with a spire and a ring of thirteen bells, twelve of which were cast by John Warner & Sons at Cripplegate, and were dedicated in 1913. The nave partially collapsed in 1800, and was rebuilt by the County architect John Johnson, retaining the Perpendicular design, but using Coade stone piers and tracery, and a plaster ceiling. The upper part of the chancel was rebuilt in 1878.

=== Cathedral ===
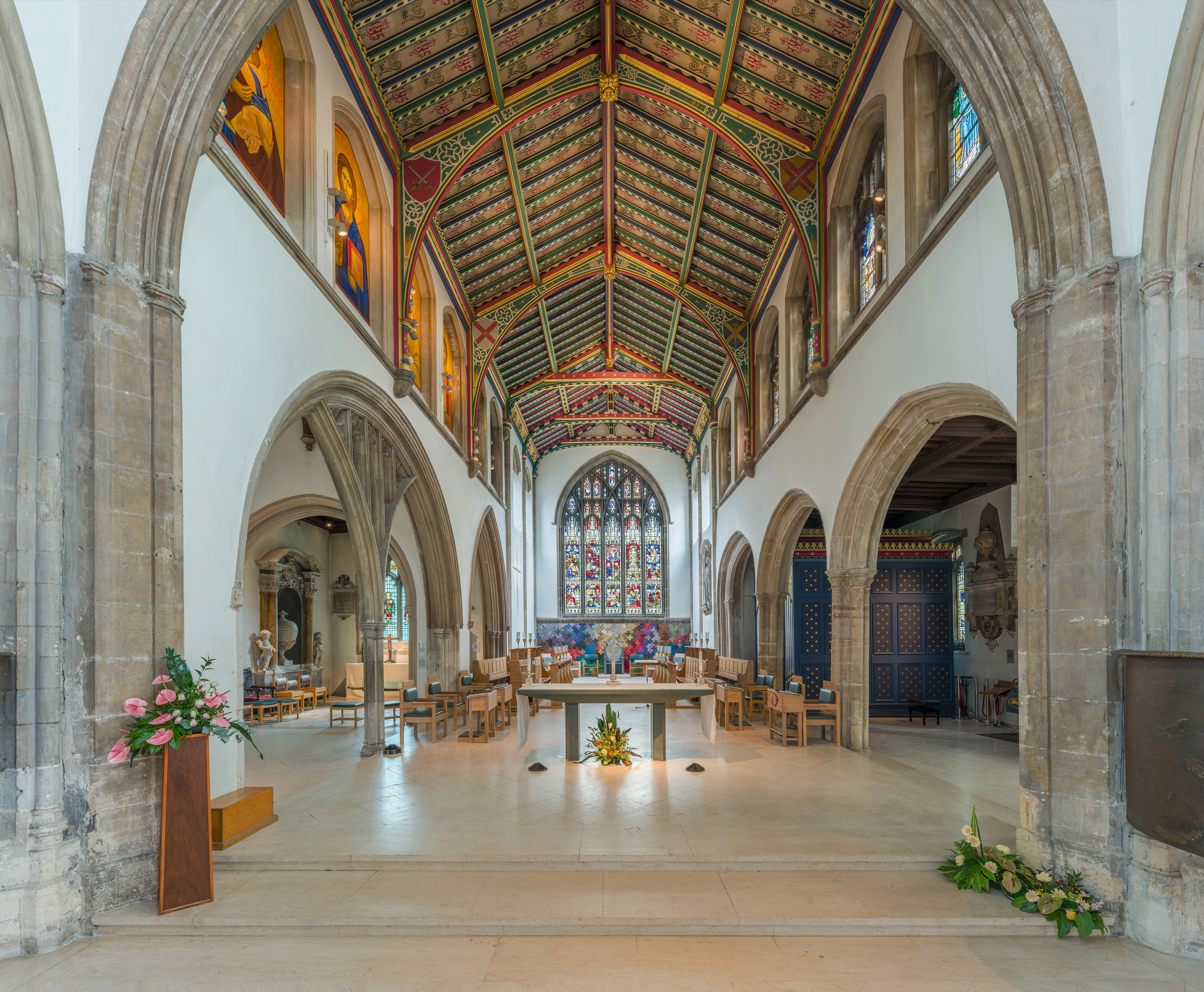
The chancel, looking east

In 1914 the church became the cathedral for the newly created Diocese of Chelmsford.

The south porch was extended in 1953 to mark Anglo-American friendship after World War II and the many US airmen stationed in Essex. In 1954, the cathedral was additionally dedicated to Saints Peter and Cedd. In 1983, the interior of the cathedral was extensively refurbished, with a new floor, seating, altar, bishop's throne, font and artwork. In 1994 and 1995 two pipe organs were installed, the first in the nave and the second in the chancel. The stained-glass windows were all installed in the 19th and 20th centuries.

In 2000 a sculpture, Christ in Glory by Peter Eugene Ball, was placed above the chancel arch. In 2004 two further major works of art were commissioned, and are now in place: Mark Cazelet's Tree of Life painting in the North Transept, and Philip Sanderson's altar frontal in the Mildmay Chapel. The dedication ceremony was attended by Prince Edward, Duke of Kent.

The cathedral celebrates its links with Thomas Hooker, who was Chelmsford Town Lecturer between 1626 and 1629; a blue plaque commemorating him is at the cathedral gates. Hooker fled to the New World because of his Puritan views and founded the town of Hartford, Connecticut and was one of the founders of American democracy.

== Music ==
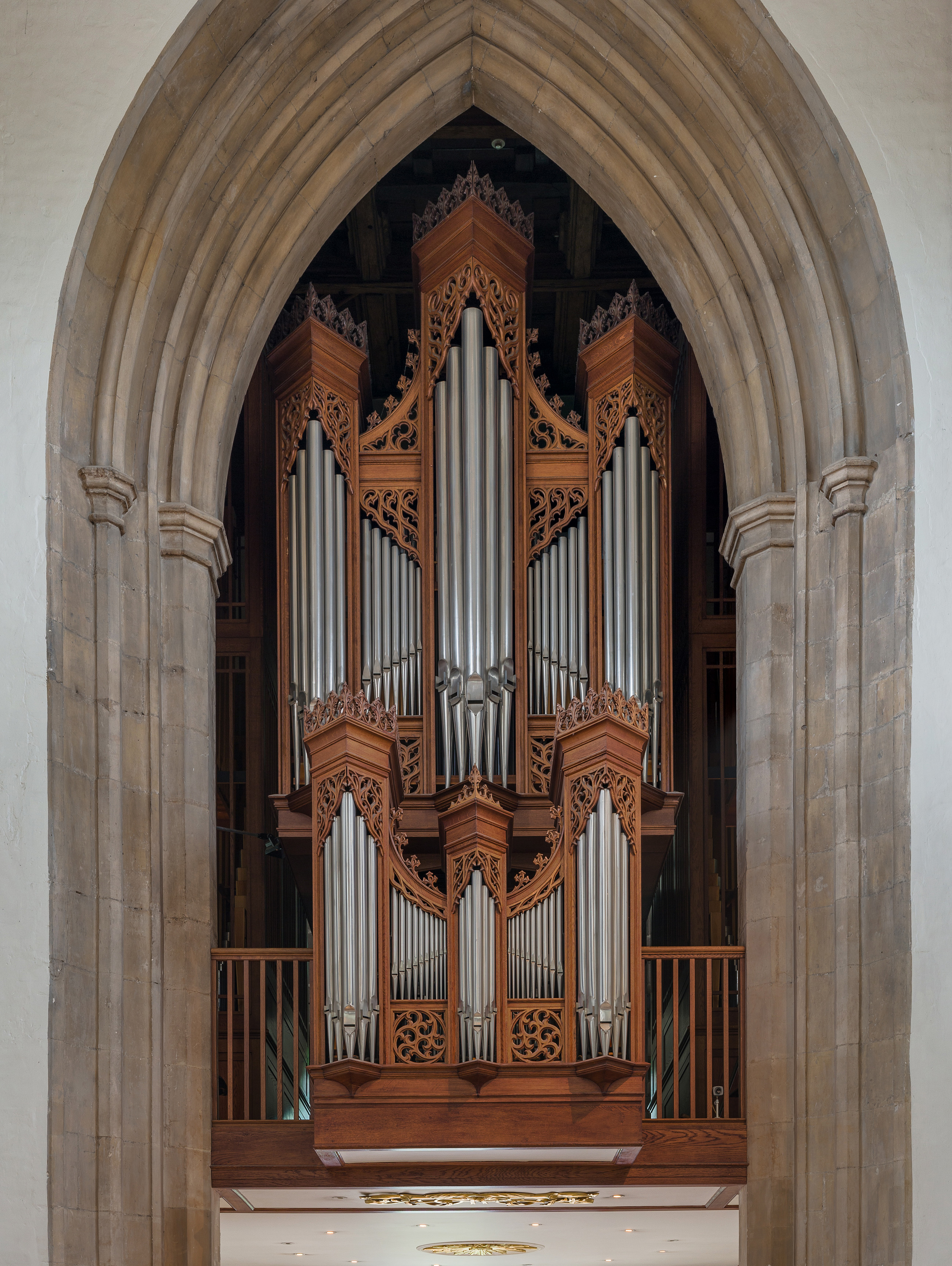
The Nave organ

- The Cathedral music department, led by the Director of Music, includes the Assistant Director of Music, Organ Scholar, PA to Residentiary Canons and Choir Welfare Assistant.
- The Cathedral Choir consists of boys and girls, a combination of school age and postgraduate choral scholars, lay clerks and volunteer singers. The Choir sing Evensong on Thursdays, Fridays and Sundays and the Choral Eucharist on Sundays.
- The Voluntary Choir, now called the Cathedral Singers, was formed in 2001 and sing at services outside of Choir term times.
- The Cathedral Choir contributed choral passages to "I Believe in You", a track on Talk Talk's 1988 album Spirit of Eden.

=== Cathedral organs ===
- The Nave Organ is situated at the west end of the cathedral under the Tower. It is a four-manual instrument with mechanical action built by Mander Organs in 1994.
- The Chancel Organ is a two manual mechanical instrument built by Mander Organs in 1995. It incorporates 19th-century pipework by Hill and Holdich and is widely admired for its character and versatility. The Nave Organ's great, swell, solo and pedal divisions can be played via an electric link from the Chancel Organ console.

A specification of the organs can be found at the National Pipe Organ Register.

=== Directors of Music ===
- 182? Charles Ambrose
- 1876 Frederick Frye
- 1945 Roland Middleton (later Organist of Chester Cathedral)
- 1949 Stanley Vann (later Master of the Music at Peterborough Cathedral)
- 1953 Derrick Edward Cantrell (later Organist of Manchester Cathedral)
- 1962 Philip Ledger (later Director of Music at King's College, Cambridge)
- 1965 John Willam Jordan
- 1981 Graham Elliott
- 1999 Peter Nardone (later Organist and Director of Music at Worcester Cathedral)
- 2012 James Davy, until October 2023 [job title changed to Organist and Master of the Choristers in 2013]
- 2023 Thomas Corns (Interim Director of Music)
- 2024 Emma Gibbins

=== Assistant Directors of Music ===
- 1999 Edward Wellman
- 2003 Robert Poyser (later Director of Music at Beverley Minster)
- 2008 Tom Wilkinson (later Organist at the University of St Andrews, Scotland)
- 2009 Oliver Waterer (later Organist at Selby Abbey
- 2013 Laurence Lyndon-Jones
- 2019 Hilary Punnett
- 2023 Samuel Bristow

== Gallery ==
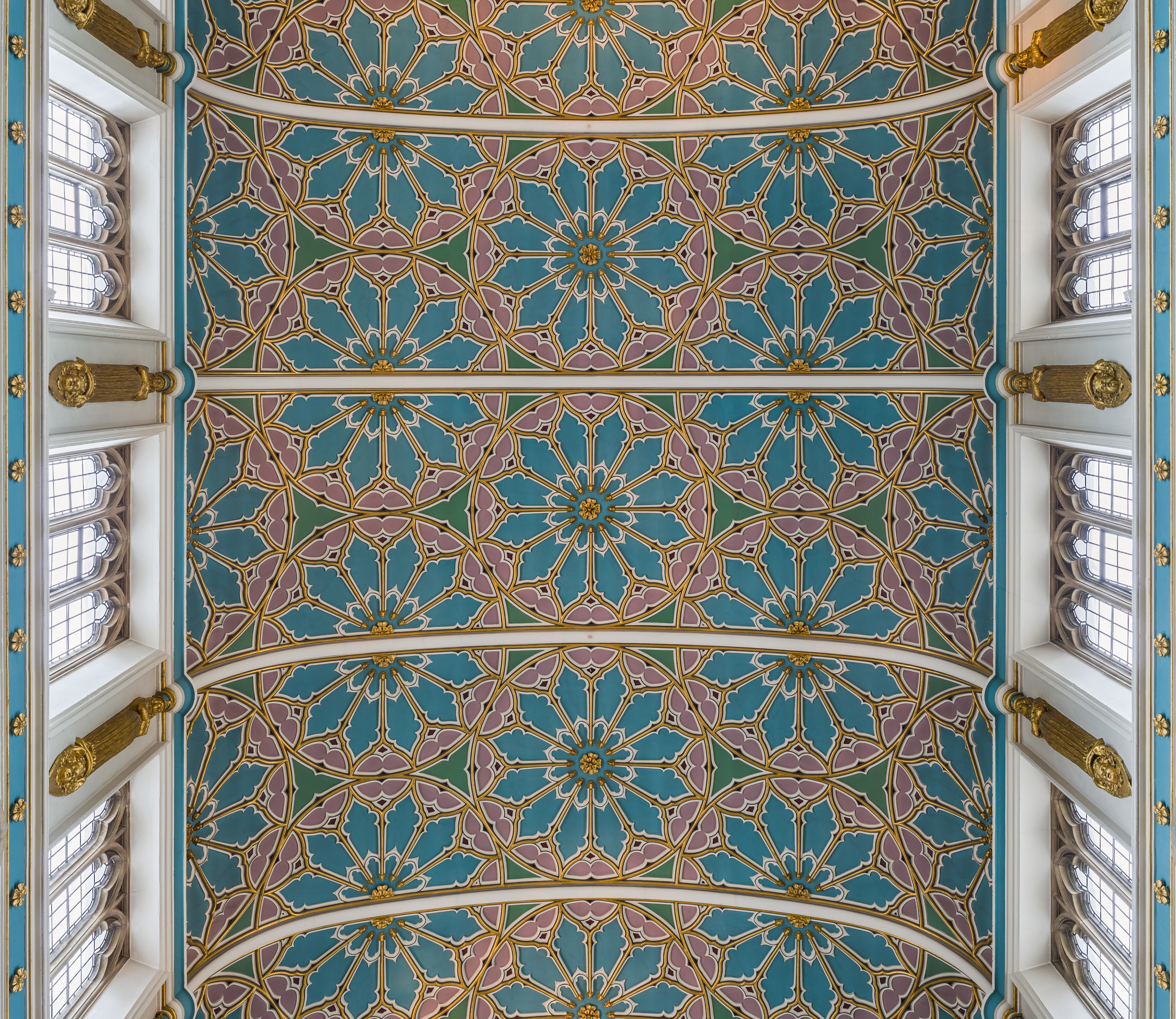
The ceiling of the nave

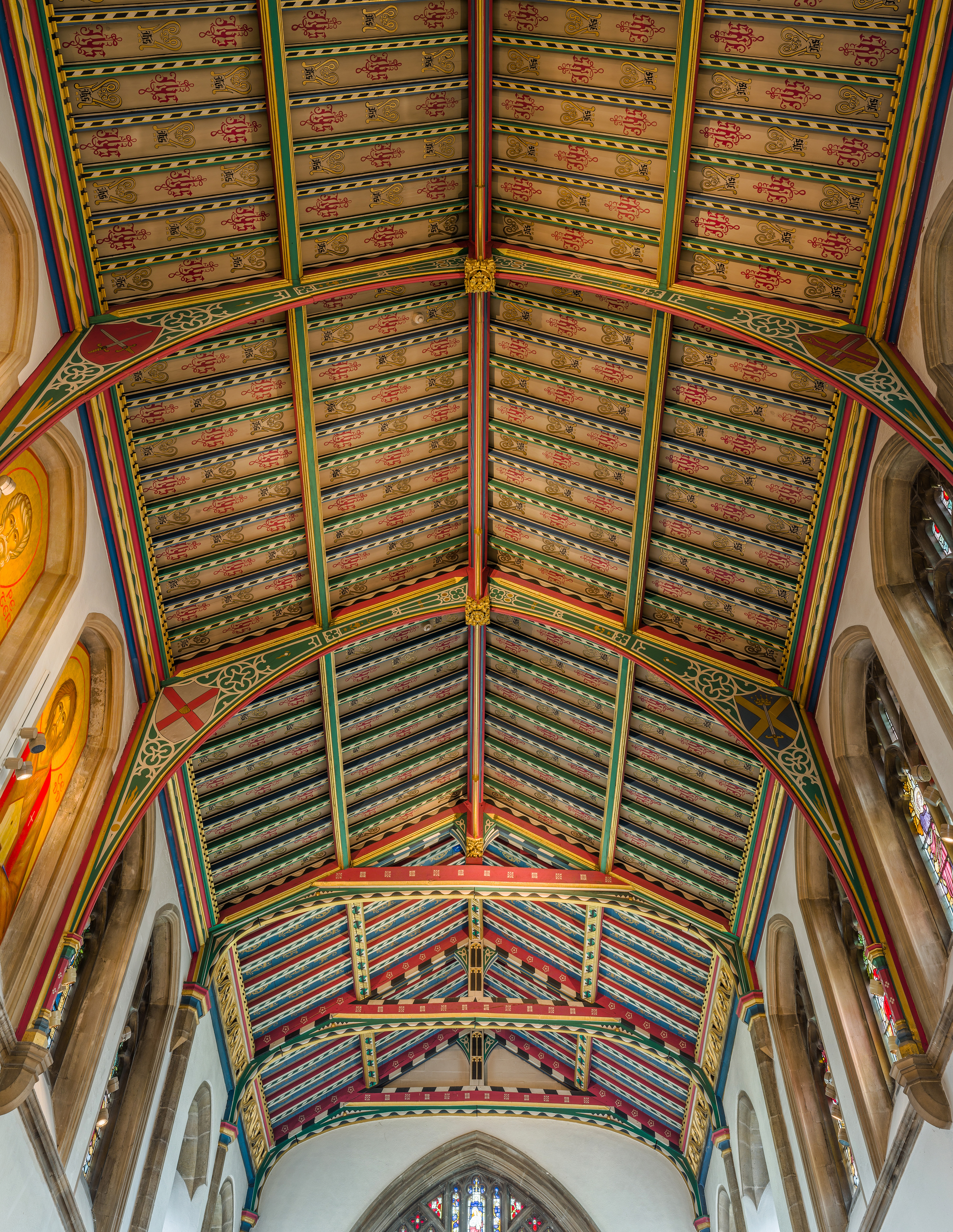
The ceiling of the chancel

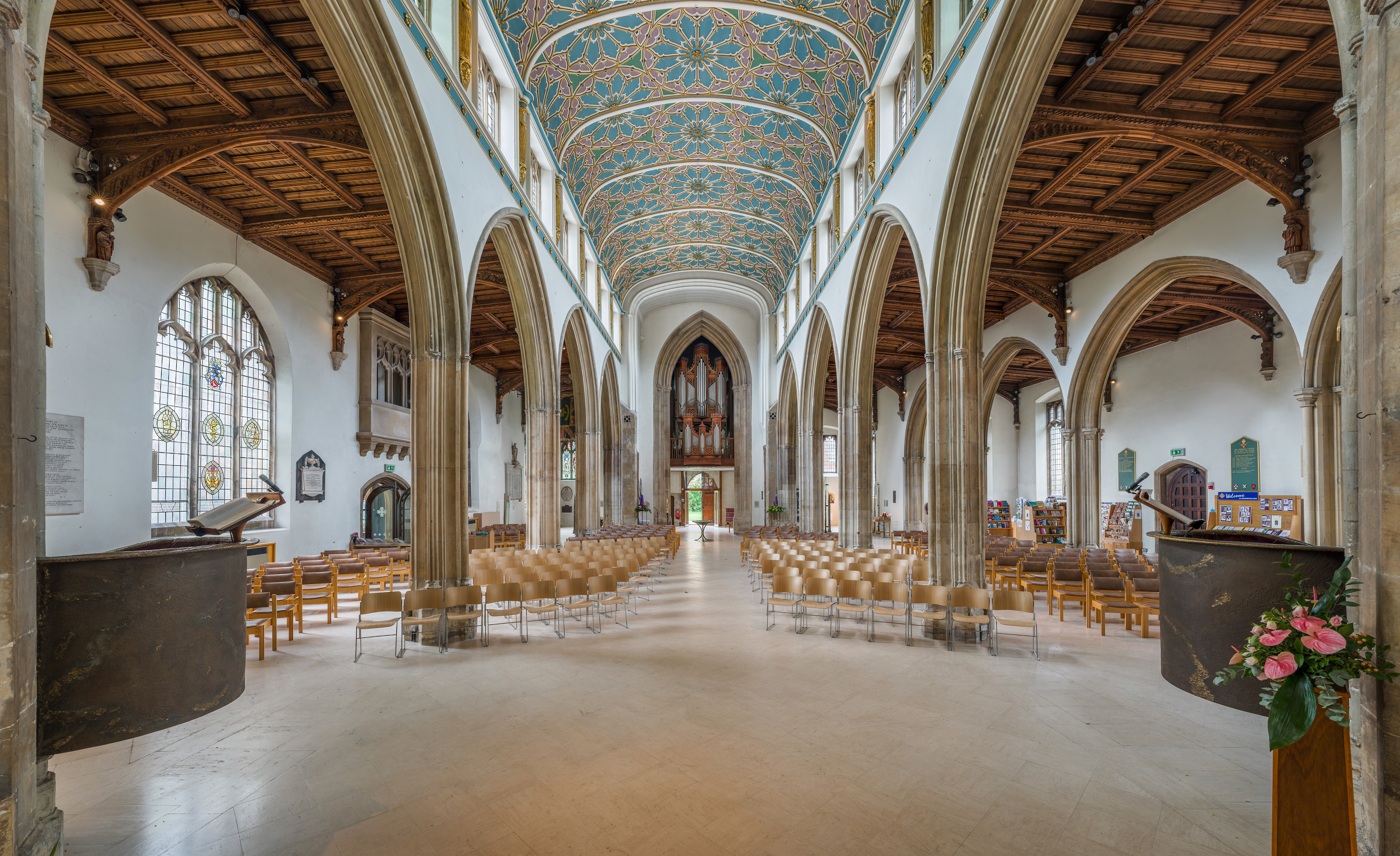
The nave looking towards the west

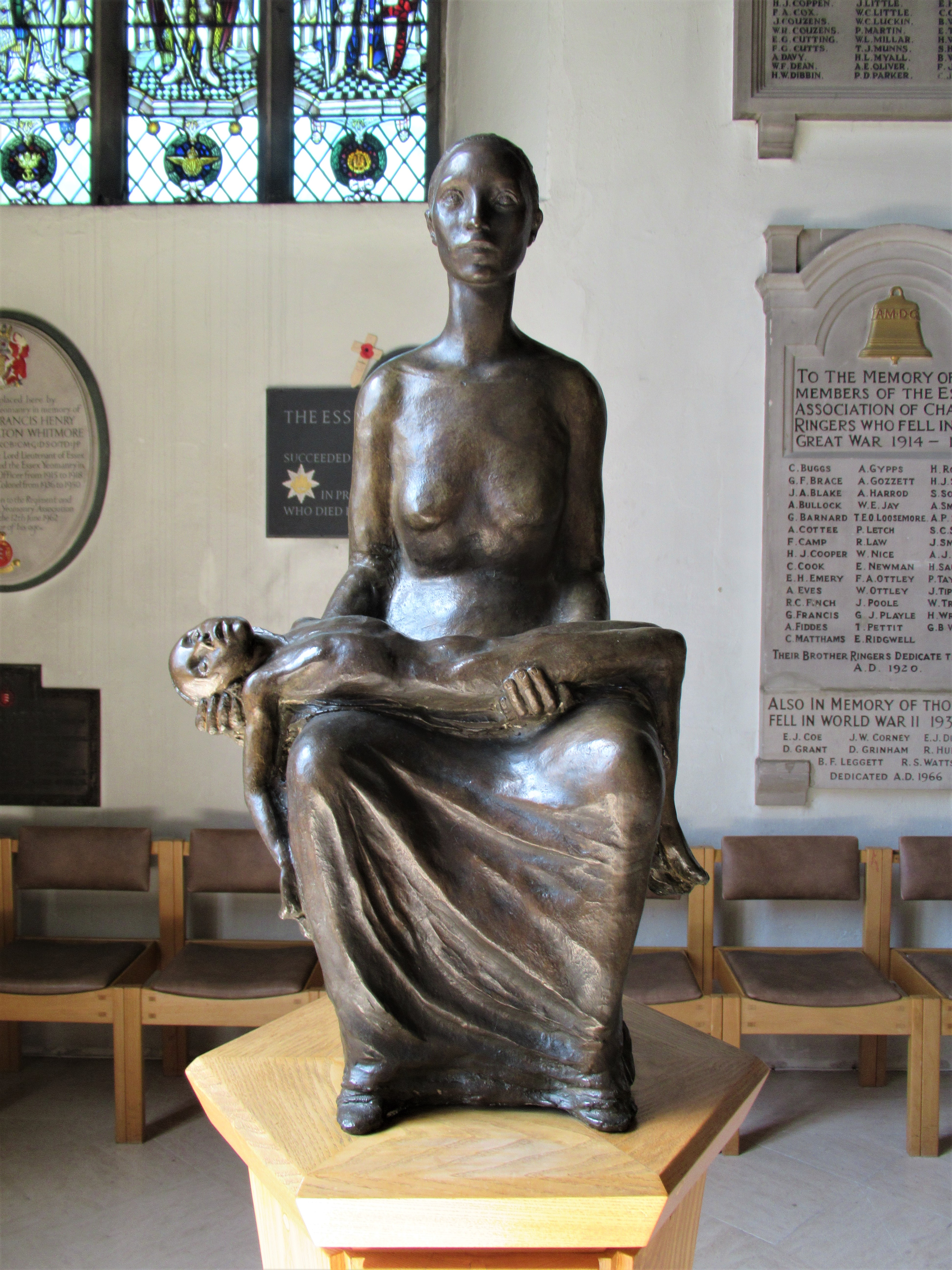
The Bombed Child by Georg Ehrlich

== See also ==
- List of cathedrals in the United Kingdom
