= Loman =

Loman may refer to:

== People and fictional characters ==
- Loman (surname), including a list of people and characters with the surname
- Lommán of Trim (fl. 5th—early 6th century), also known as Saint Loman, Irish bishop and saint

== Places ==
- Loman, Jaghori, a village in Jaghori, Afghanistan
- Loman, Alba, a village in Alba County, Romania
- Loman, Minnesota, United States, an unincorporated community
- Loman Branch, a minor tributary of the Cacapon River, West Virginia, United States

== See also ==
- Lohman (disambiguation)
- Lowman (disambiguation)
- Luman (disambiguation)
