= Lowman (surname) =

Lowman is a surname. Notable people with the surname include:

- David Lowman (intelligence official) (1921–1999), American executive for the National Security Agency
- David Lowman (priest) (born 1948), British Anglican priest and former archdeacon
- Guy Lowman (1877–1943), American football, basketball, and baseball coach and baseball player
- Guy Sumner Lowman Jr. (1909–1941), American linguist
- G. E. Lowman (1897–1965), American Methodist minister and radio evangelist
- Margaret D. Lowman (born 1953), American biologist, ecologist, writer, and explorer
- Mary D. Lowman (1842–1912), American mayor
- Moses Lowman (1680–1752), an English nonconformist minister
- Nate Lowman (born 1979), American artist
- Paul Lowman (fl. 1999–present), Canadian musician
- Paul D. Lowman (1931–2011), American geophysicist
- Rodney L. Lowman (born 1949), American psychologist
- Seymour Lowman (1868–1940), American lawyer and Lieutenant Governor of New York

Fictional characters include:

- Happy (Sons of Anarchy), on the television show Sons of Anarchy

== See also ==
- Loman (surname)
- Lohman (disambiguation)
