= Amos M. Gailliard Jr. =

Amos Gailliard
- Born: September 26, 1928
- Died: April 8, 2014 (aged 85)
- Military career
- Allegiance: United States
- Branch: United States Army
- Rank: Brigadier General
- Conflicts: Korean War

Amos Marcus Gailliard Jr. (September 26, 1928 – April 8, 2014) was the son of famed musician and trombone player, Amos Gailliard. As a member of the United States military, he rose from the rank of private to brigadier general.

== Personal life ==
The youngest of three children born to Anna Govan and Amos Gailliard, Sr in New York City. Amos Gailliard, Jr. fondly referred to as "Junnie" by his two sisters, Julia and Jessie (deceased). In his post college years, would marry Barbara Jean Miles of Harlem, NY and adopted three children Michael Dallum (Michael Stephen Gailliard) and then later Cathy Edwards (Donna Lynn Gailliard-Ashley Evans) and finally, Donna Marie Wilson (Tracey Michelle Gailliard-Williams). He would also serve as the President of the Zeta Zeta Lambda chapter of Alpha Phi Alpha in 1984. In the late 1960s, according to How East New York Became a Ghetto, he was a program manager for Model Cities East New York. He would work as a Project Manager for IBM.

== Military career ==
In 1951, he graduated from South Carolina State University and is a member of Alpha Phi Alpha. He was listed in Historically Black Colleges and Universities: An Encyclopedia: An Encyclopedia due to his military career. He would rise to the rank of Master Sgt before becoming an officer.

Brigadier General Amos M. Gailliard Jr. served on active duty during the Korean War in the United States Army and as a Major transferred into the National Guard in the State of New York. He was commander of the 14th Group, New York Guard which was upgraded to brigade status under his leadership and provided support operations at the TWA flight 800 disaster recovery site. As a Col he would serve in HHC, Army Division, Civil Affairs as part of the 14th GRP (LI). In August 1995, he was promoted to brigadier general in the New York Guard.

On February 28, 2005, he was awarded a Distinguished Alumnus award from Dr. Andrew Hugine Jr. the President of South Carolina State University. On October 2, 2008, he presented the Order of Saint Maurice to LTC John W. Peterkin. Amos died on April 8, 2014. He was honored by the 77th Infantry Division at the Fort Totten Chapel upon his death in 2014.
