= Lowman =

Lowman may refer to:

== Places ==
- Lowman, Idaho, United States, an unincorporated rural census-designated place
- Lowman, New York, United States, a hamlet
- Mount Lowman, Usarp Mountains, Antarctica
- 10739 Lowman, an asteroid
- Lowman Hall, South Carolina State College, a historic academic building in Orangeburg, South Carolina, United States

== People and fictional characters ==
- Lowman (surname), a list of people and fictional characters
- Lowman Pauling, a member of The "5" Royales American R&B group

== See also ==
- Loman (disambiguation)
