= Lohman =

Lohman may also refer to:

== People ==
- Al Lohman (1933-2002), American radio personality and comedian
- Alexander de Savornin Lohman (1837-1924), Dutch politician
- Alison Lohman (born 1979), American actress
- Augie Lohman (1911-1989), film special effects artist
- Jan Lohman (born 1959), Dutch football player
- Joanna Lohman (born 1982), American soccer player
- Joseph D. Lohman, American educator and politician
- Pete Lohman (1864–1928), American baseball player
- Timothy M. Lohman (born 1951), American chemist

== Places ==
- Lohman, Missouri, United States, a city

== See also ==
- Lohman Block, Chinook, Montana, a building on the US National Register of Historic Places
- Lohmann
- Loman (disambiguation)
- Lowman (disambiguation)
