= South Carolina State University =

Historically black university in Orangeburg, South Carolina, US

- Former names: Colored Normal Industrial Agricultural and Mechanical College of South Carolina (1896–1954); South Carolina State College (1954–1992)
- Motto: Scientia, Officium, Honos
- Motto in English: Knowledge, Duty, Honor
- Type: Public university HBCU; Land-grant university
- Established: March 4, 1896
- Accreditation: SACS
- Endowment: $17.2 million (2023)
- President: Alexander Conyers
- Students: 2,649
- Undergraduates: 2,374
- Postgraduates: 275
- Location: Orangeburg, South Carolina, United States; 33°29′50″N 80°51′00″W
- Campus: 447 acres (181 ha), (160 acres (65 ha) at Orangeburg campus, 287 acres (116 ha) additional acres at Camp Harry Daniels in Elloree, South Carolina)
- Colors: Garnet and blue
- Nickname: Bulldogs and Lady Bulldogs
- Sporting affiliations: NCAA Division I – MEAC
- Website: scsu.edu

South Carolina State University (SCSU or SC State) is a public, historically black, land-grant university in Orangeburg, South Carolina. It is the only public, historically black land-grant research university in South Carolina, is a member of the Thurgood Marshall College Fund, and is accredited by the Southern Association of Colleges and Schools (SACS).

== History ==
The university's beginnings were as the South Carolina Agricultural and Mechanical Institute in 1872 in compliance with the 1862 Land Grant Act within the institution of Claflin College—now known as Claflin University.

In 1896 the South Carolina General Assembly passed an act of separation and established a separate institution – the Colored Normal Industrial Agricultural and Mechanical College of South Carolina, its official name until 1954.

=== 1920s–1940s ===
Academic programs received more attention as the student population increased, but other programs, such as the university's high school, were forced to close due to the Great Depression. The New Deal Programs were used to create, among other things, Wilkinson Hall, the university's first separate library building (now home to Admissions and Financial Aid).

=== 1940s–1950s ===
The college's campus grew, as it purchased over 150 acres (61 ha) for agricultural learning. After World War II, many students flocked to the college, creating a classroom shortage problem for the school. In 1947, the United States Army created an ROTC detachment, in which all male students were required to enroll until mandatory enrollment ended in 1969.

The school's name changed, as well, as the South Carolina General Assembly renamed the school South Carolina State College in 1954. Because of the "separate but equal" laws in the state, the legislature gave the college large sums of money to build new academic facilities and dormitories, some of which still stand on the campus today, including the Student Union (1954), and Turner Hall (1956). This was done in order to give black students an environment of "equal" education. Also, the legislature created a law program for the college, mainly to prevent black students from attending the law school at the then-segregated University of South Carolina. The law program folded in 1966 after the University of South Carolina integrated.

=== 1960s–1980s ===
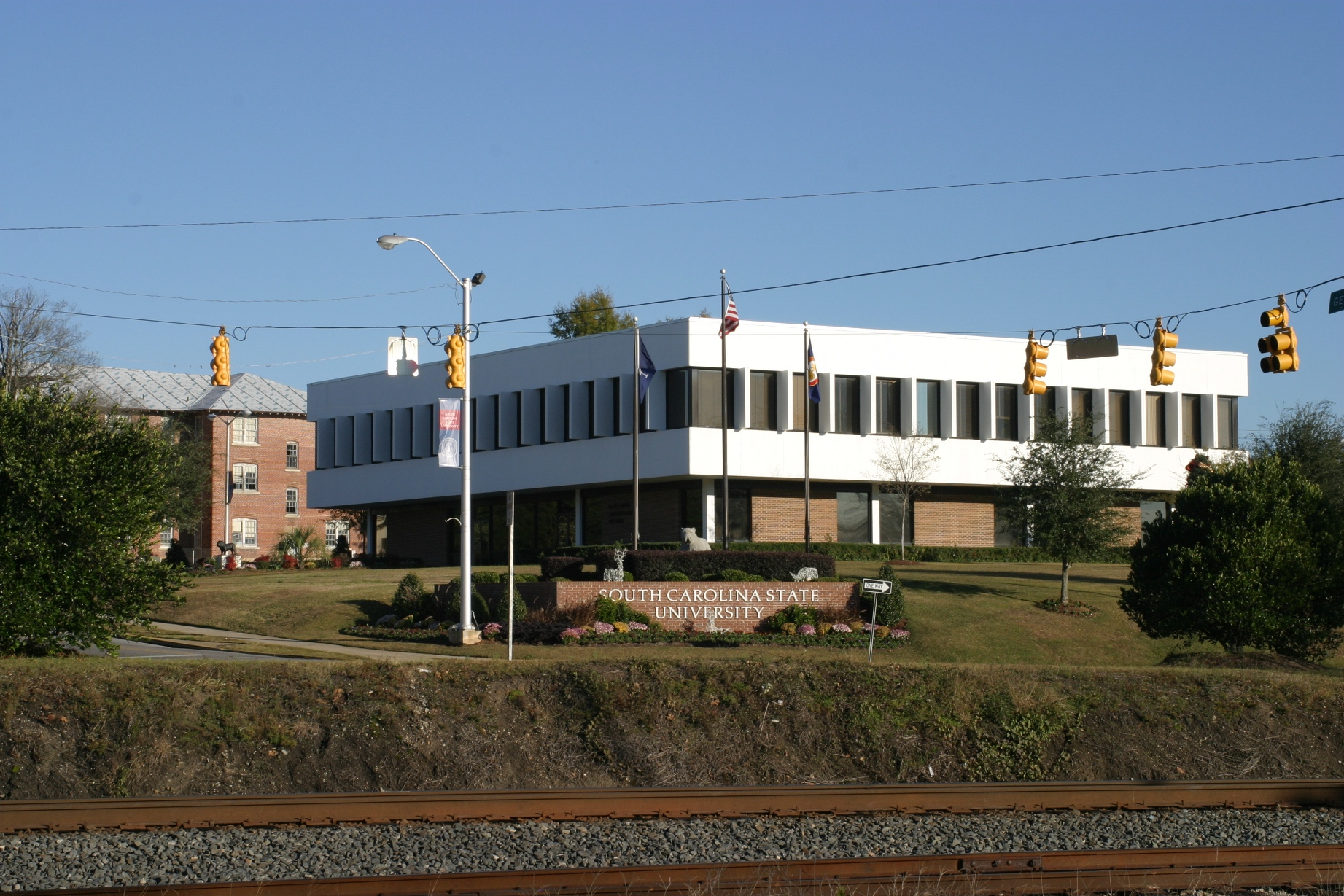
South Carolina State University Administration Building, Orangeburg, South Carolina

During the height of the Civil Rights Movement, many students participated in marches and rallies aimed at ending segregation. The struggle came to a climax on the night on February 8, 1968, when three students were killed and 27 others were wounded by state policemen at the height of a protest that opposed the segregation of a nearby bowling alley. The tragedy, known as the Orangeburg massacre, is commemorated by a memorial plaza near the front of the campus.

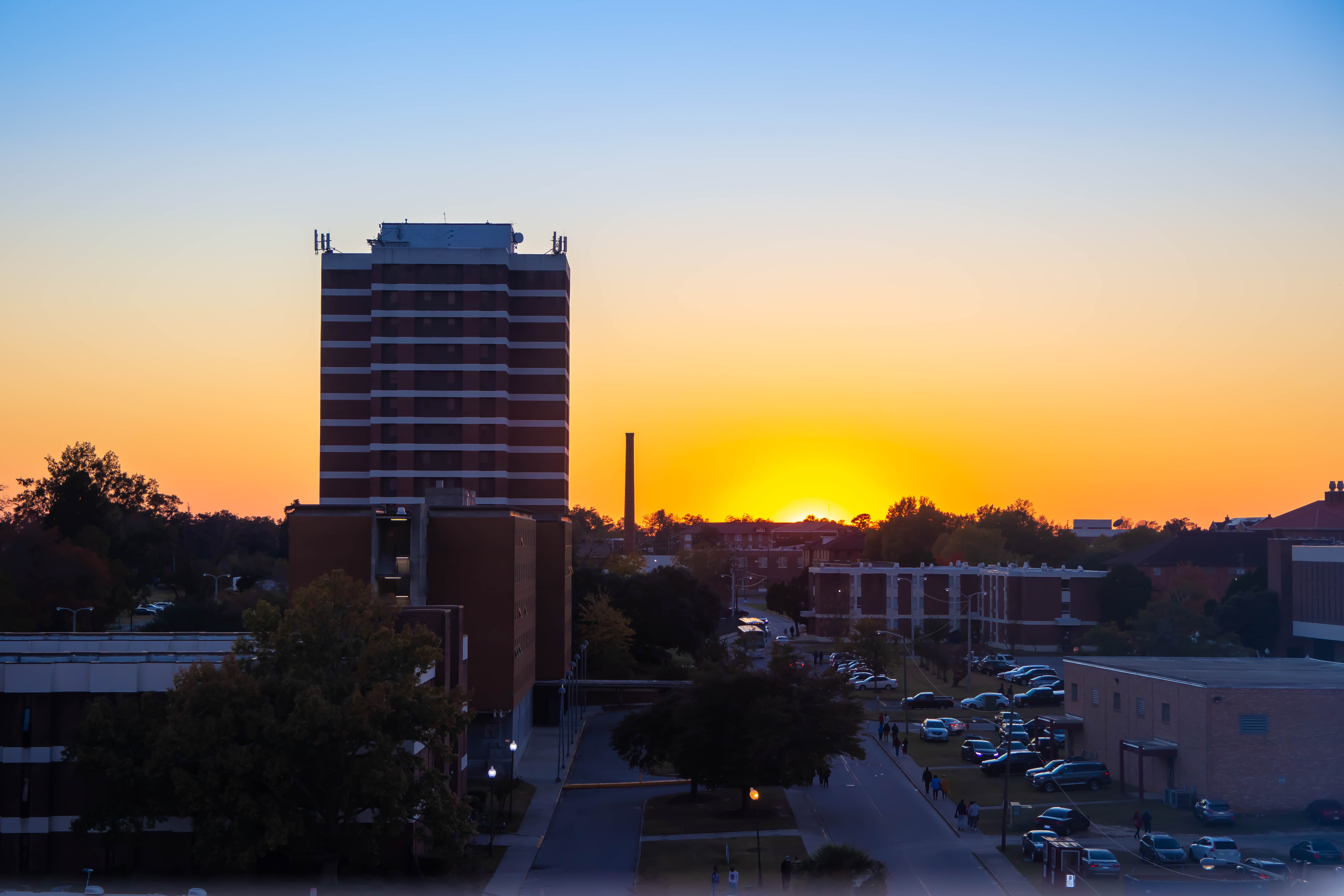
Sojourner Truth Hall at sunset at SC State University

From the late-1960s to the mid-1980s, under the leadership of M. Maceo Nance, the campus experienced unprecedented growth in the form of new academic buildings, such as Nance Hall (1974) and Belcher Hall (1986), new residence halls, such as Sojourner Truth Hall (1972), which, at 14 stories, is the tallest building in Orangeburg County, and a new library building (1968), not to mention enlargements and renovations of existing facilities. The school also opened the I.P. Stanback Museum & Planetarium, which is the only facility of its kind on a historically black university campus in the United States. After Nance's retirement in 1986, Albert Smith assumed the office of the school's president and, among other achievements, created an honors college in 1988.

=== 1990s ===
During the tenure of Smith, the school also gained university status from the South Carolina General Assembly, becoming South Carolina State University in February 1992. In 1993, Barbara Hatton became the school's first female president and created many improvements for the campus, such as the 1994 renovation of Oliver C. Dawson Bulldog Stadium, constructing new suites and a larger press box, as well as increasing its capacity to 22,000. Hatton also spearheaded the creation of a plaza which resides in front of the Student Union and passes by several dorms and buildings in the central portion of the campus. Under SC State's next president, Leroy Davis, South Carolina State University celebrated its 100th anniversary in 1996, and the school constructed a Fine Arts Center in 1999, giving the Art and Music departments a new home.

=== 2000–present ===
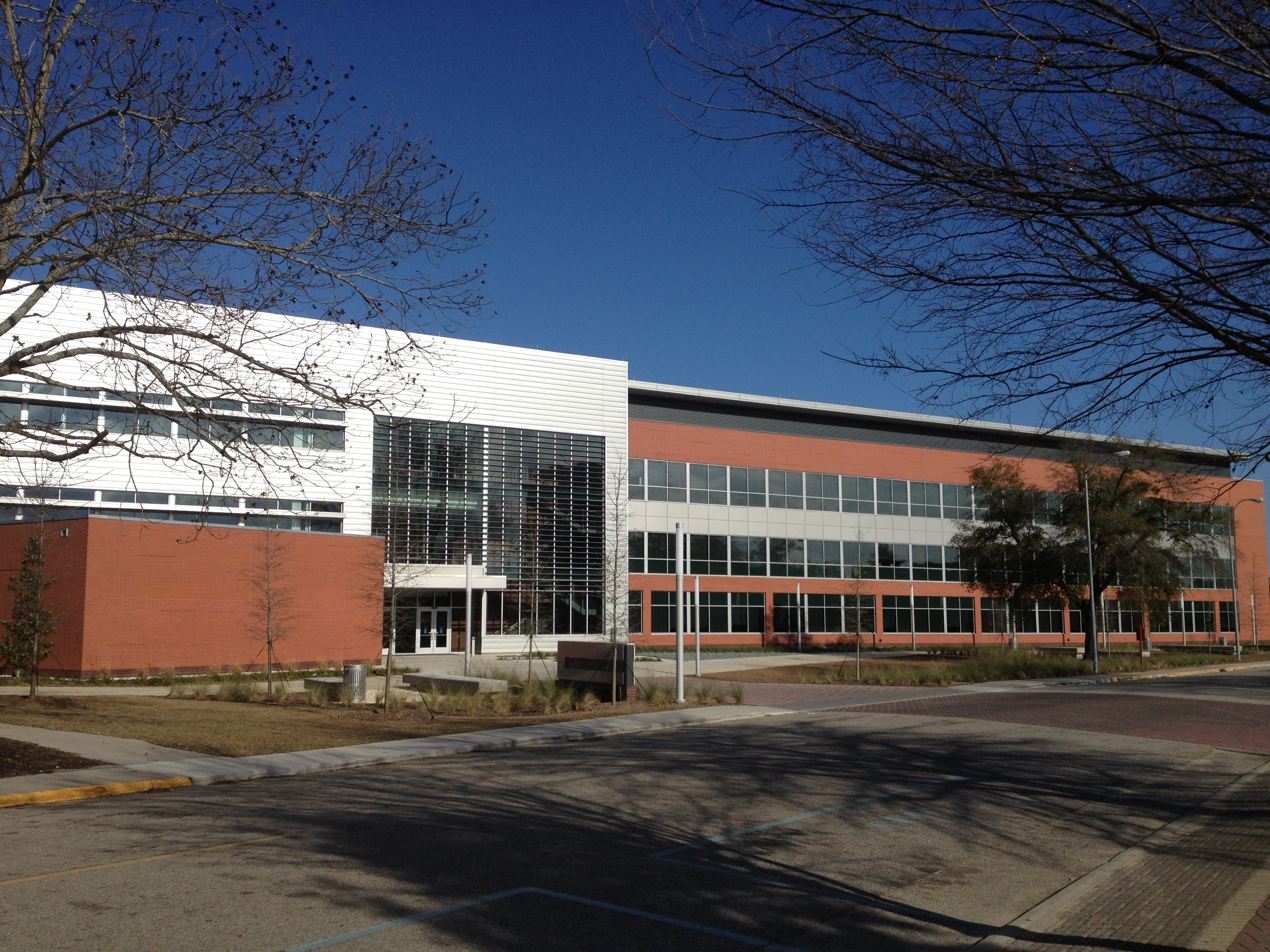
SC State Engineering and Computer Science Complex

Under the leadership of Andrew Hugine Jr., the school constructed a new 771-bed residence hall (Hugine Suites), which is the largest dormitory in South Carolina. The first four buildings in Phase One opened on August 26, 2006, and the last two in the first phase opened on September 10, 2006. With the opening of the new dorms, SC State has closed the following dorms, Bethea (freshmen male), Miller (female), Bradham (female), and Manning (female) Halls. Both Bradham and Manning Halls had been used since the World War I era, Miller Hall is being closed due to fire alarm system malfunctions, and Bethea is being closed after 50 years of service due to numerous building and health problems. Bethea Hall will be torn down to make way for a new $33 million complex for the School of Engineering.

The dining halls, both Washington Dining Hall and "The Pitt", located in the Student Union, received major facelifts, and the dining hall inside Truth Hall has been renovated into a cyber cafe, Pete's Arena. The university is also working to renovate Lowman Hall, which, when refurbished, will be the new administration building. South Carolina State recently broke ground on the new James E. Clyburn University Transportation Center (UTC), which will be home to the only UTC in South Carolina, one of only three among Historically Black Colleges and Universities (HBCUs), and one of only 33 total UTCs in the nation. Currently work is being done to expand Hodge Hall. This science building will be gaining some much needed research and laboratory space.

South Carolina State hosted the first debate of the 2008 Democratic Party Presidential Candidate Debate series. This event, which took place on April 26, 2007, at the Martin Luther King Auditorium, was televised nationally on MSNBC. This debate made SC State the first historically black university to host a presidential candidate debate on its campus.

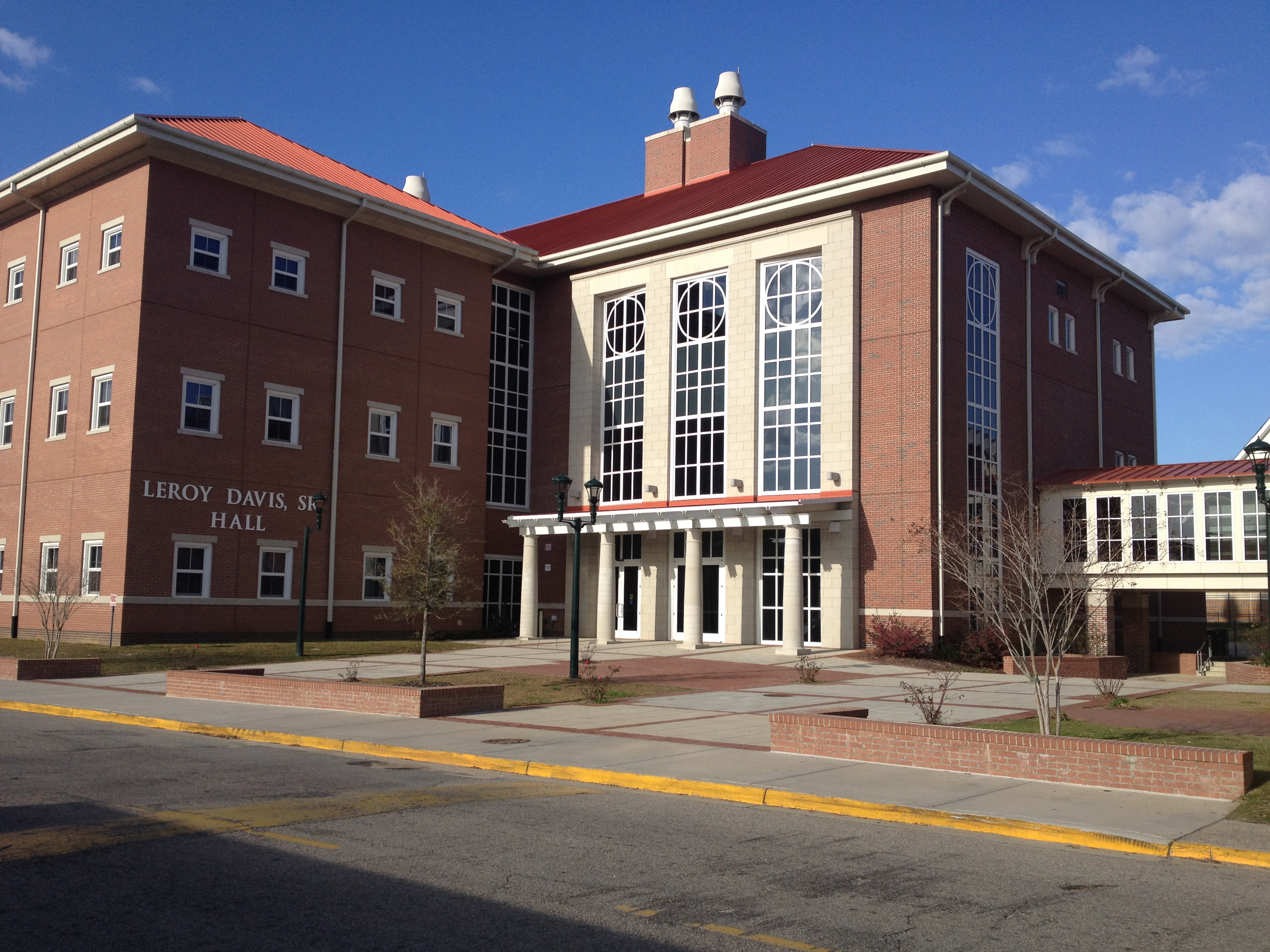
Leroy Davis Sr. Hall

Hugine's contract was terminated by the SC State Board of Trustees on December 11, 2007, only four days before the Fall Commencement Exercises, by a telephone conference meeting. According to the board, his reasons for dismissal were a performance review for the 2006–2007 school year and a second education review. The board decided to conduct a national search for a new president immediately. On December 13, 2007, the board selected Leonard McIntyre, the Dean of the College of Education, Humanities and Social Sciences at SC State to serve as interim president. Hugine was the fourth president to leave SC State since Nance retired in 1986.

George Cooper, formerly with the U.S. Department of Agriculture, assumed the presidency of S.C. State on July 16, 2008, and was the tenth president. The SC State Board of Trustees voted to terminate Cooper's contract on June 15, 2010. John E. Smalls, senior vice president of finance, was appointed to lead the university in the interim. President Cooper was reinstated two weeks later after a change in board membership. His predecessor, Andrew Hugine, Jr., who was also dismissed and sued the university, eventually accepting $60,000 to drop his suit for defamation and breach of contract. Hugine, now president of Alabama A&M University, sought $1-million from South Carolina State and $2-million from the trustees who voted to oust him.

In 2021, President Joe Biden visited Orangeburg to deliver a commencement address at South Carolina State.

On Martin Luther King Jr. Day in 2026, the flag of S.C. State flew above the South Carolina State House, to recognize S.C. State's defeat of Prairie View A&M University in the Celebration Bowl. This was the first time the flag of any historically Black college or university flew above the South Carolina State House.

== Academics ==
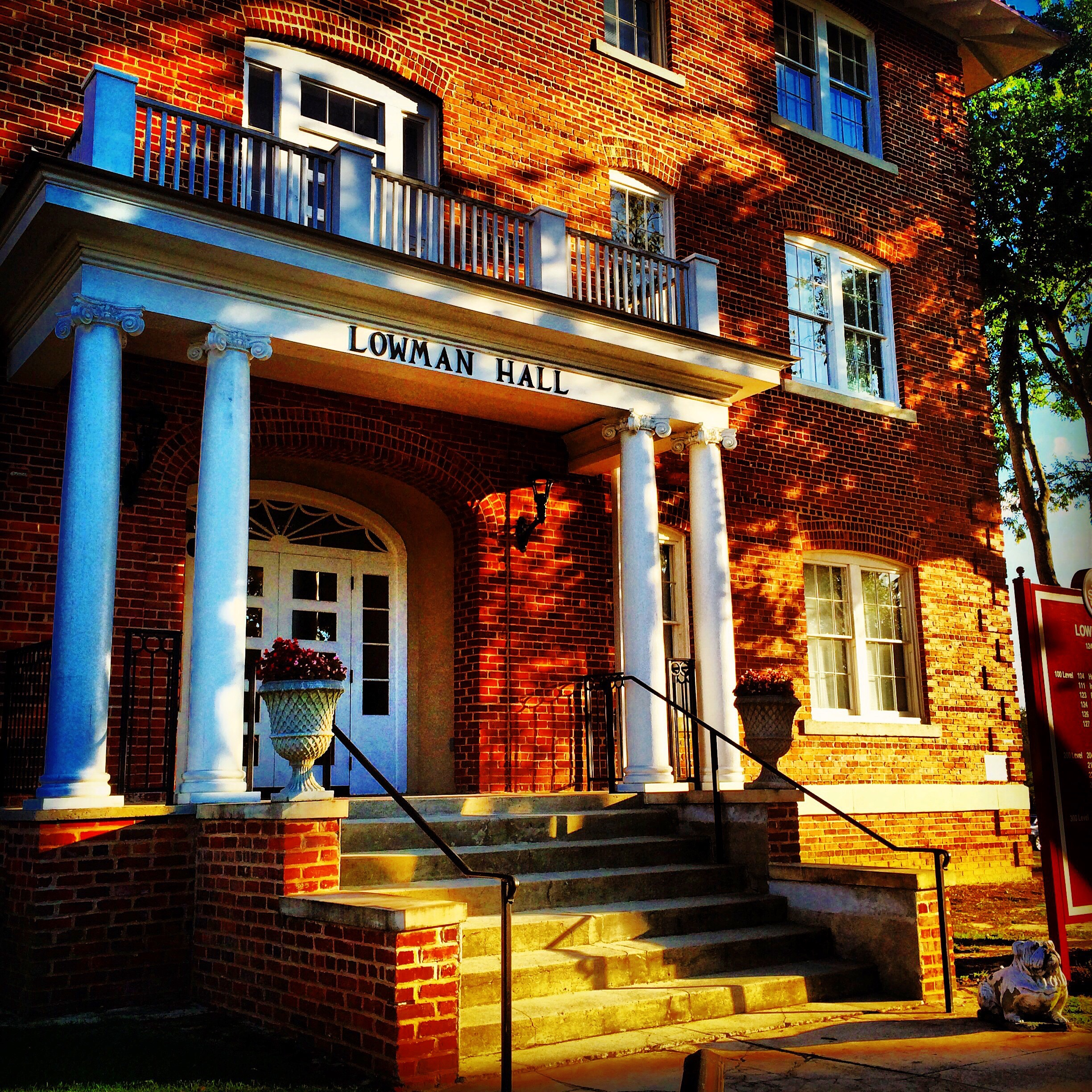
Lowman Hall

Academic programs at the university are housed in six colleges.

- College of Education, Humanities, and Social Sciences
- College of Graduate and Professional Studies
- College of Science, Technology, Engineering, Mathematics, and Transportation
- College of Agriculture, Family & Consumer Sciences
- College of Business and Information Systems
- Dr. Emily England Clyburn Honors College

=== Nuclear engineering program ===
SCSU is the only university in South Carolina and only HBCU in the nation to offer a bachelor's degree in nuclear engineering. The program is accredited by the Engineering Accreditation Commission of ABET. Currently, it operates through a strategic partnership with North Carolina State University and University of Wisconsin-Madison.

=== Accreditation ===
South Carolina State is accredited by the Southern Association of Colleges and Schools (SACS). Also, programs in Civil Engineering, Industrial Engineering, Nuclear Engineering, Computer Science, Mechanical Engineering Technology, and Electrical Engineering Technology, are accredited by the Accreditation Board of Engineering and Technology (ABET). Beginning in 2026, South Carolina State University will add programs in Electrical, Mechanical, and Computer Engineering.

The university was placed on probation in June 2014 for failing to meet the accreditor's standards "concerning governing board conflicts of interest and board/administration structure, as well as financial stability and controls". In June 2015, the SACS kept the university on probation for another year. In June 2016, SACSCOC removed the college from probation.

=== Rankings ===
In 2023, U.S. News & World Report ranked SC State 76 out of 136 in the "Regional Universities South" category and 39 out of 79 among HBCUs.

== Campus ==
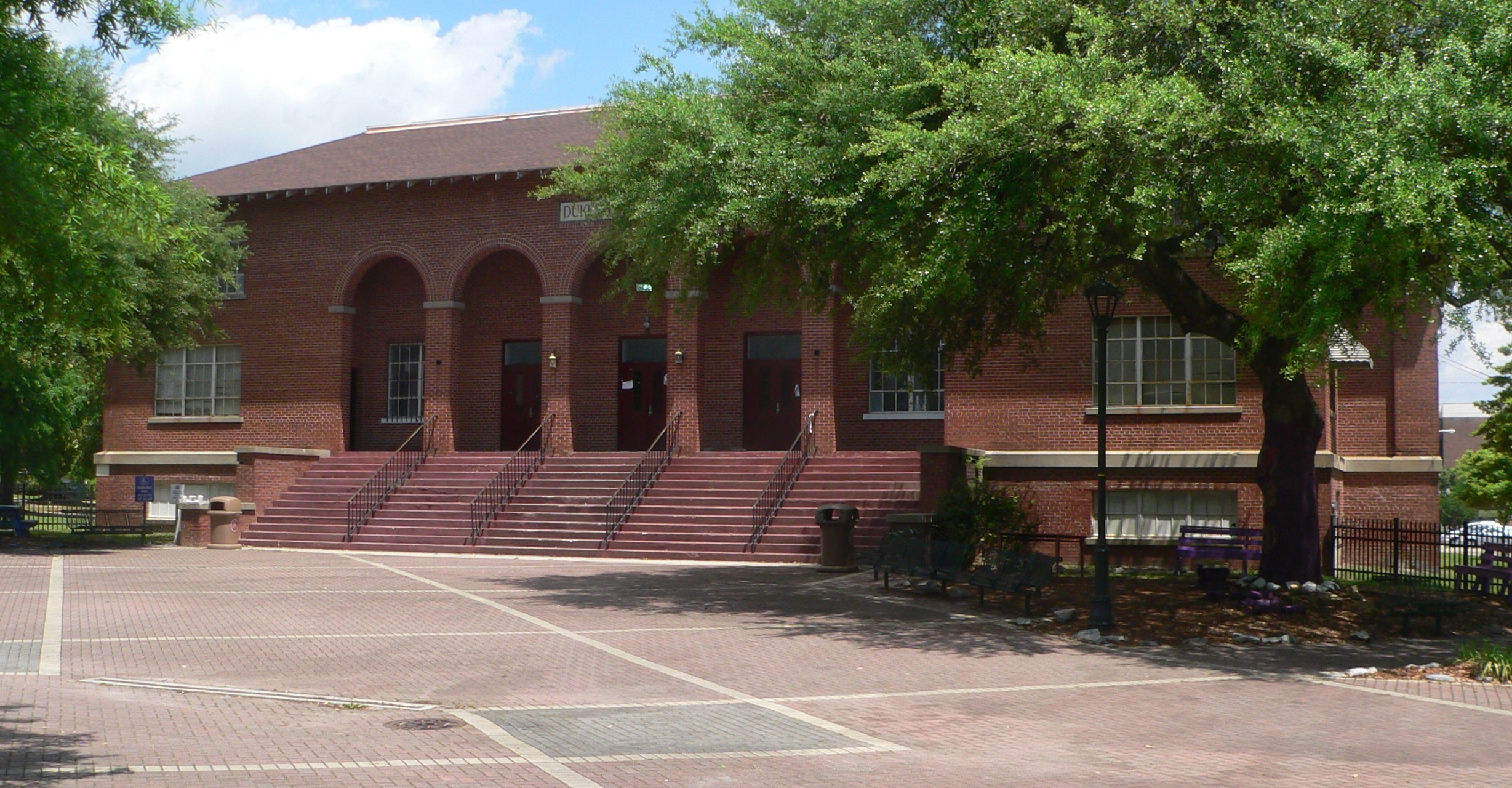
Dukes Gym

The school's campus size is 160 acres (65 ha), with an additional 267 acres (108 ha) at Camp Harry Daniels in Elloree, South Carolina. Three buildings, Lowman Hall, Hodge Hall, and Dukes Gymnasium are included in the South Carolina State College Historic District, and separately listed on the National Register of Historic Places.

The library is the Miller F. Whittaker Library. The library was allocated $1 million from the South Carolina General Assembly in 1967 for its construction, and the library was dedicated in 1969. The library is named in honor of the university's third president. Originally two levels, a third level (the mezzanine) was added in a 1979 expansion.

== Athletics ==
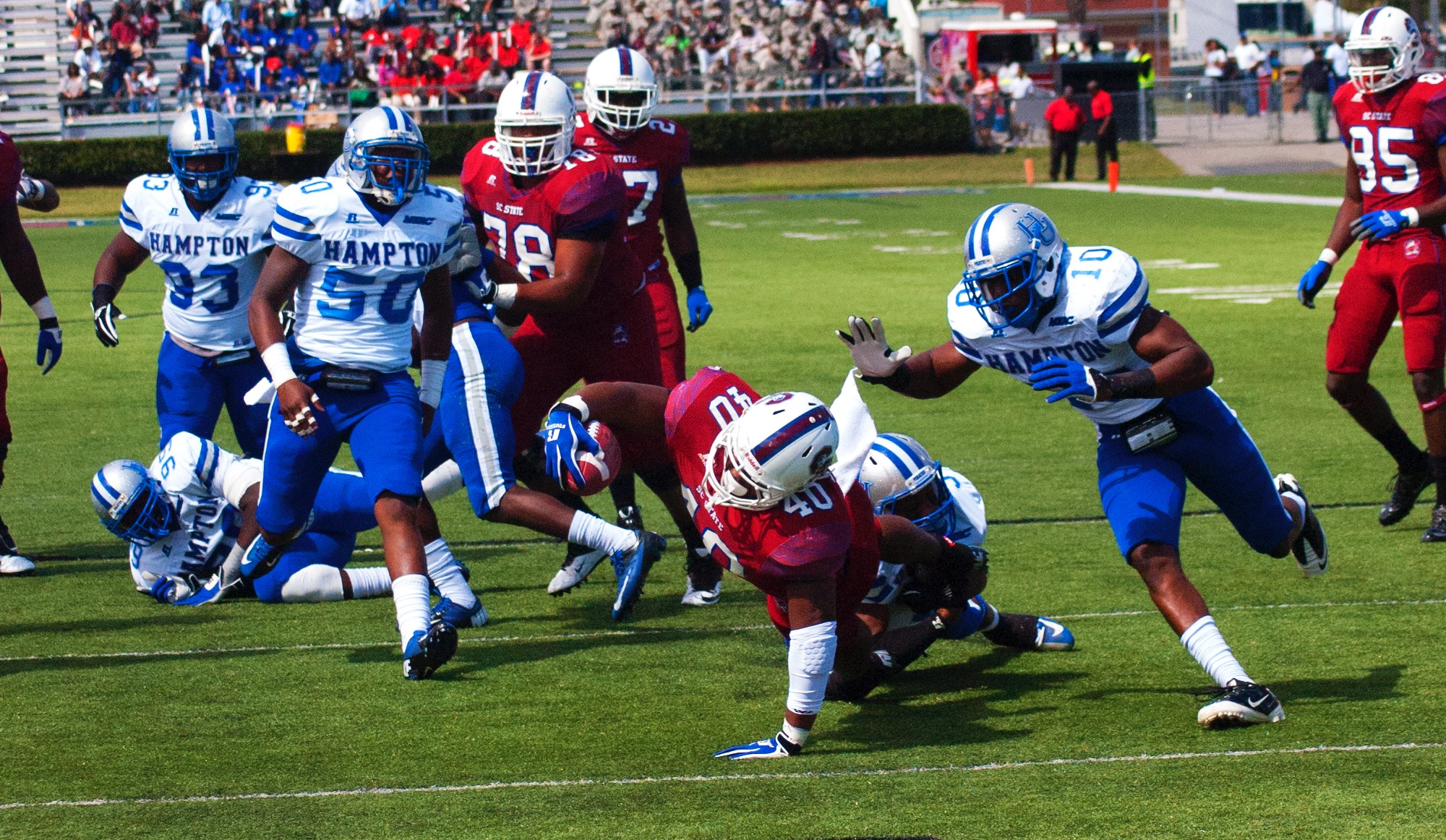
SC State Bulldogs vs. Hampton Pirates

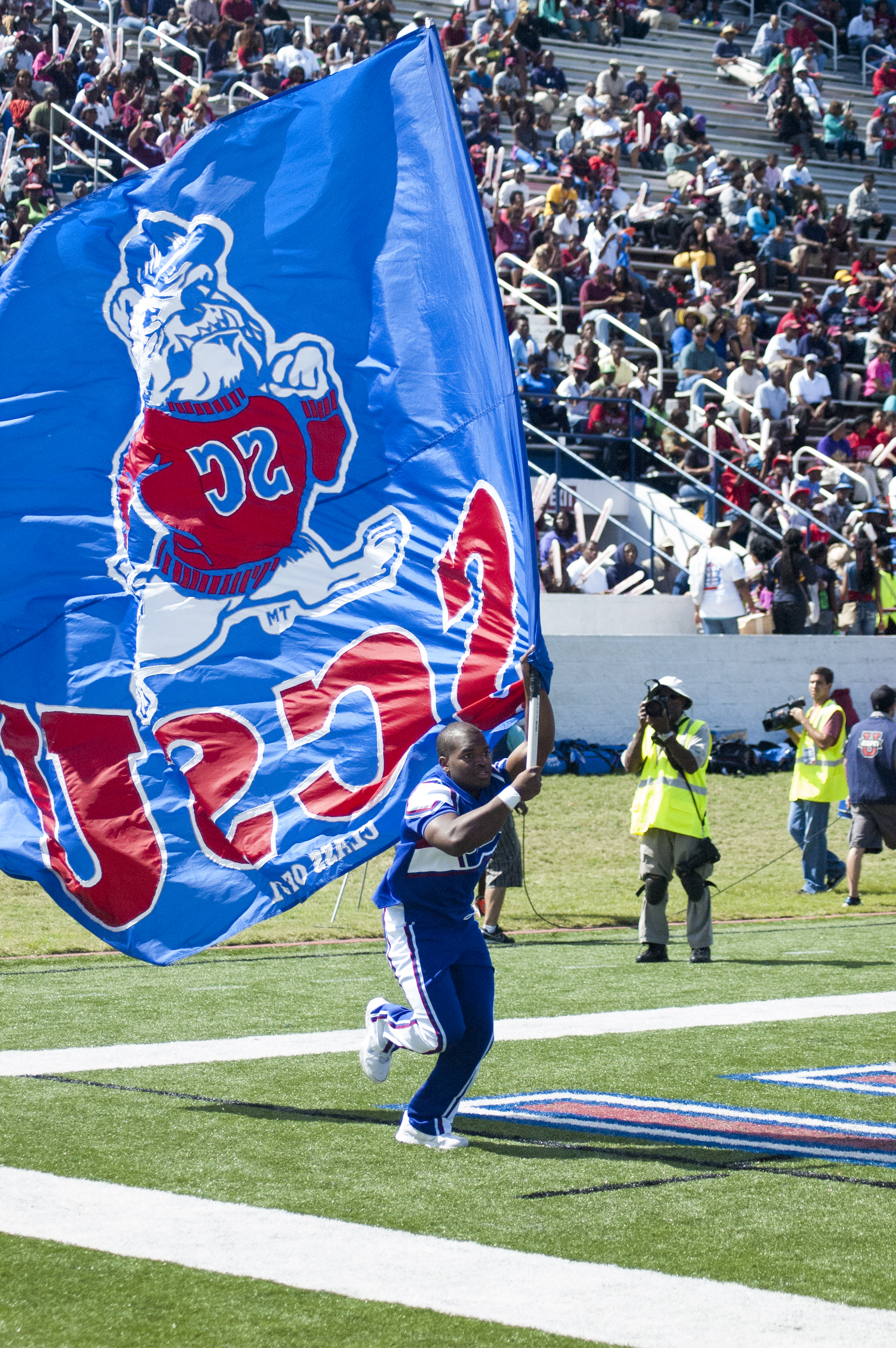
Game Flag of SC State University

South Carolina State is a charter member of the Mid-Eastern Athletic Conference (MEAC) and participates in NCAA Division I (FCS for college football). The school sponsors basketball, soccer, volleyball, softball, cross country, track and field, and tennis for women, and basketball, tennis, track and field, cross country, and football for men. The athletic teams compete as the Bulldogs or Lady Bulldogs and the school colors are garnet and navy blue.

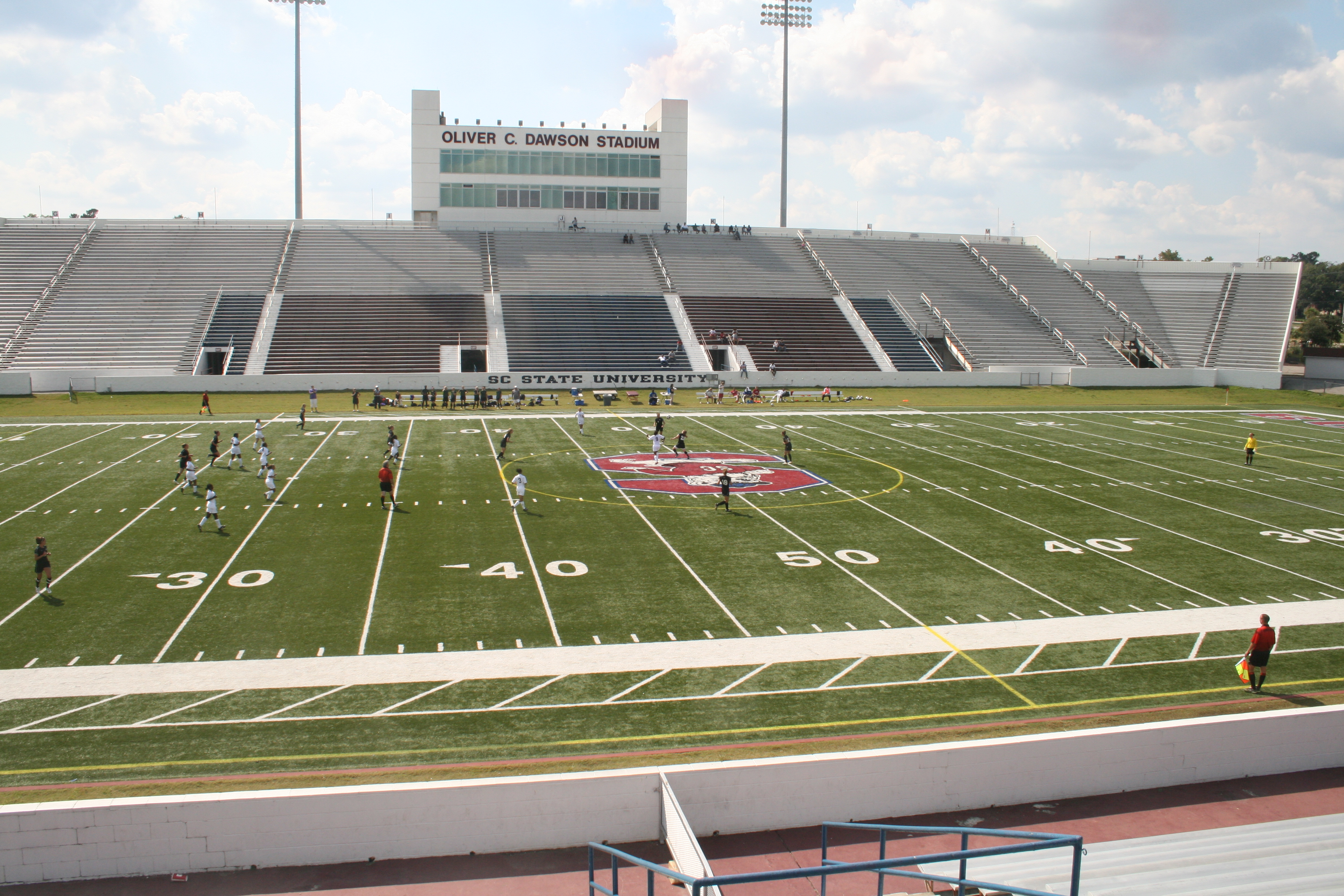
Oliver C. Dawson Stadium

The school's football team has won more conference championships than any other school in the MEAC with 19 championships. Three former Bulldogs are members of the College Football Hall of Fame, including coach Willie Jeffries. The team also has seven Black college football national championship titles, with the most recent title won in 2025.

== Student life ==
Undergraduate demographics as of Fall 2023
Race and ethnicity	Total
Black	93%
Two or more races	3%
Unknown	3%
White	1%
Economic diversity
Low-income (Note: The percentage of students who received an income-based federal Pell grant intended for low-income students.)	68%
Affluent (Note: The percentage of students who are a part of the American middle class at the bare minimum.)	32%

There are over 50 registered student organizations on campus.

=== Marching band ===
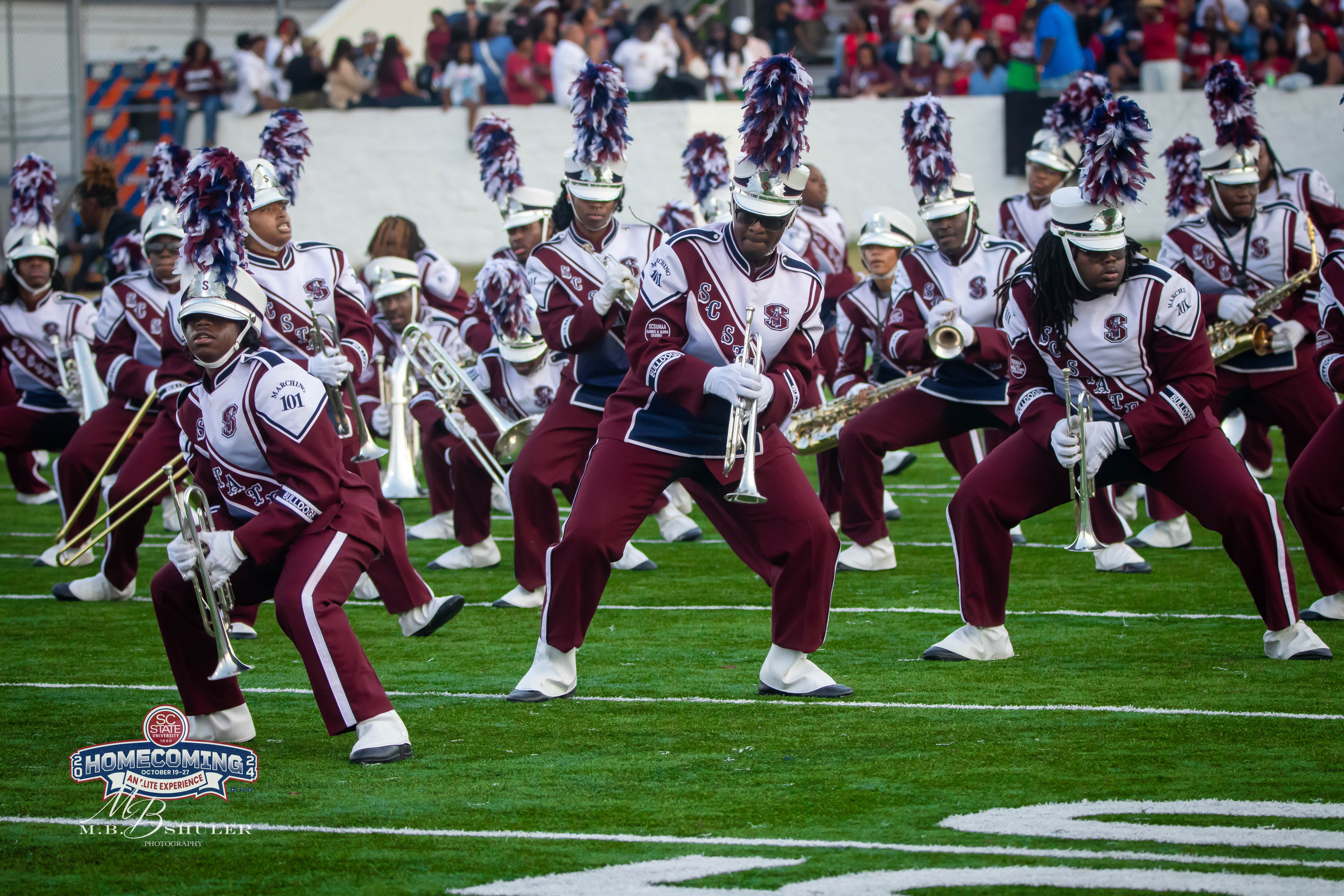
The Marching 101

The university's marching band is known as The Marching 101. The band are regular performers at football games throughout the southeast, nationally televised professional football games, and has performed in The Macy's Thanksgiving Day Parade and The Rose Bowl Parade. The band was organized in 1918 as a "regimental band" performing military drills as well as assisting with music in the college Sunday school and other occasions. From 1924 on, a succession of band directors influenced the growth of the band as it became part of the Department of Music program. The nickname "Marching 101" came about when the band started with 100 members and 1 majorette. Today, the band has over 150 members and is accompanied by a majorette team named " Champagne". In 2011, 2012, 2014 and 2016, the Marching 101 was voted to perform at the annual Honda Battle of the Bands held in the Georgia Dome in Atlanta. On May 15, 2025, the official video for the Boots on the ground (song) featuring the band debuted on May 15, 2025, on the Sherri Shepherd Show.

== Notable alumni ==
=== Academia and research ===
Name	Class year	Notability	Reference(s)
Kandice Tanner	2002	Senior Investigator at the National Cancer Institute, where she is head of the Tissue morphodynamics section	

=== Business ===
Name	Class year	Notability	Reference(s)
Richard G. Shaw		First African-American to serve as Insurance Commissioner in West Virginia	

=== Education ===
Name	Class year	Notability	Reference(s)
Essie Mae Washington-Williams	1946	Educator and African-American daughter of former U.S. Senator Strom Thurmond	
Andrew Hugine, Jr.	1971, 1974	Former S.C. State President (2003–2008); former President of Alabama A & M University	
M. Christopher Brown II	1993	former President of Kentucky State University Former President of Alcorn State University	
Benjamin F. Payton	1955	Former President of Tuskegee University	
George Bradley	1983	Former President of Paine College	
Anthony Parker	1975	President of Albany Technical College	
John H. Dozier	1993	Former Institute Community and Equity Officer of Massachusetts Institute of Technology; Current President of Columbia College (South Carolina)	

=== Arts and media ===
Name	Class year	Notability	Reference(s)
Doris Funnye Innis	1955	writer, journalist, educator, editor of Congress of Racial Equality publications, Rights and Reviews and CORE Magazine	
Horace Ott		pianist, composer, conductor and record producer	
Ron Westray		jazz trombonist, composer and educator	
Armstrong Williams	1981	syndicated radio, television and newspaper political columnist	
Charlton Singleton	1994	music educator, conductor, founding member of Grammy Award Winning ensemble Ranky Tanky	https://charltonsingleton.com/bio/
Kára McCullough	2013	Miss District of Columbia USA 2017 and Miss USA 2017	http://missdistrictofcolumbiausa.com/

=== Politics, law, and government ===
Name	Class year	Notability	Reference(s)
Juanita Goggins		First African-American woman elected to the South Carolina legislature	
James E. Clyburn	1961	U.S. Representative from South Carolina (1993–present) and Majority Whip (2007–2011) in the United States Congress	
Ernest A. Finney, Jr.	JD, 1954	First African-American Supreme Court Justice appointed to the South Carolina Supreme Court since the Reconstruction Era	
Matthew J. Perry	1948,1951	United States Federal Judge	
Clifford L. Stanley	1969	U.S. Under Secretary of Defense for Personnel and Readiness	
John W. Matthews, Jr.		South Carolina State Senate	
Darline Graham	2009	United States Senator from South Carolina (2026–present)	

=== Military ===
Name	Class year	Notability	Reference(s)
Amos M. Gailliard Jr.	1951	retired Brigadier General in the New York Guard	
Abraham J. Turner	1976	retired Major General in the United States Army	
Stephen Twitty	1985	retired Lieutenant General in the United States Army	
Henry Doctor Jr.	1954	retired Lieutenant General in the United States Army	

=== Sports ===
Name	Class year	Notability	Reference(s)
Bobby Lewis	1968	Point guard and originator of the Two Ball Skills Development Program. 2017 Naismith Basketball Hall of Fame Nominee	
Javon Hargrave	2016	NFL nose tackle	
Willie Jeffries	1959	Legendary college football coach at South Carolina State and Howard University. He was first African-American coach of a Division I majority white school.	
Deacon Jones		former professional football player for the Los Angeles Rams, San Diego Chargers, and Washington Redskins; inducted into the Pro Football Hall of Fame in 1980	
Phillip Adams	2010	NFL defensive back	
Joe Ikhinmwin	2012	Former professional basketball player and team captain of London Lions (basketball)	
Willie Aikens		former Major League Baseball player	
Rickey Anderson		former National Football League running back	
Orlando Brown		former professional football player for Cleveland Browns and Baltimore Ravens.	
Rafael Bush	2010	former NFL defensive back	
Barney Bussey	1984	former NFL defensive back	
Kenny Bynum		former National Football League running back	
Harry Carson		former professional football player for the New York Giants; inducted into the Pro Football Hall of Fame in 2006	
Edwin Bailey	1980	former NFL guard for the Seattle Seahawks	
Rufus Bess	1978	former professional football player for the Minnesota Vikings	
Charlie Brown	1981	former professional football player Washington Redskins	
Barney Chavous	1973	former NFL defensive end	
Dextor Clinkscale	1979	former National Football League safety for the Dallas Cowboys	
Chartric Darby		Professional football player for Tampa Bay Buccaneers and Seattle Seahawks.	
Will Ford		former professional football player in the Canadian Football League	
John Gilliam	1966	former professional football player for the St. Louis Cardinals, New Orleans Saints and Minnesota Vikings	
Darius Hadley		former professional football player in the Arena Football League	
Dwayne Harper	1987	former professional football player for the Seattle Seahawks	
LaKendrick Jones		former football player in the Arena Football League	
William Judson	1981	former professional football player Miami Dolphins	
Angelo King	1980	former professional football player Dallas Cowboys	
James Lee		former professional football player Tampa Bay Buccaneers	
Shaquille Leonard	2017	former professional football player for the Indianapolis Colts	
Marshall McFadden		NFL linebacker	
Robert Porcher	1992	former professional football player for the Detroit Lions	
Raleigh Roundtree		former National Football League player	
Donnie Shell	1974	former professional football player for the Pittsburgh Steelers; inducted into the Pro Football Hall of Fame in 2020	
Mickey Sims		former professional football player Cleveland Browns	
Christian Thompson	2012	NFL defensive back for Baltimore Ravens	
Wendell Tucker	1965	former professional football player for the Los Angeles Rams	
