= David Lowman =

David Lowman may refer to:

- David Lowman (intelligence official) (1921–1999), American executive for the National Security Agency
- David Lowman (priest) (born 1948), British Anglican priest and former archdeacon
