= Lohmann =

Lohmann is a surname. Notable people with the surname include:

- Dietrich Lohmann (1943–1997), German cinematographer
- Fred von Lohmann, American lawyer
- George Lohmann (1865–1901), English cricketer
- Hanns-Heinrich Lohmann (1911–1995), German Obersturmbannführer, in the Waffen SS during World War II
- Hans Lohmann (archaeologist) (born 1947), German classical archaeologist
- Henry Lohmann (1924–1967), Danish actor
- Jacob Lohmann (born 1974), Danish actor
- Jens Lohmann (born 1956), Mexican modern pentathlete
- Julia Lohmann (born 1977), German multidisciplinary designer
- Juliana Lohmann (born 1989), Brazilian actress and model
- Kai Lohmann, Australian rules footballer
- Katie Lohmann (born 1980), American model and actress
- Lúcia Garcez Lohmann (IPNI Abbreviation: L.G.Lohmann), a botanist
- Ludger Lohmann (born 1954), German classical organist
- Martin B. Lohmann (1881–1980), American politician and businessman
- Nicolai Johan Lohmann Krog (1787–1856), Norwegian politician
- Paul Lohmann (1926-1995), cinematographer
- Sydney Lohmann (born 2000), German footballer
- Ulf Lohmann, German electronic music producer
- Walter Lohmann (1878–1930) German marine officer who gave name to the Lohmann Affair
- Walter Lohmann (1911–1993) German cyclist
- Wilhelmine Lohmann (1872-?), German teacher, social worker, and temperance leader

== Fictional characters ==
- Karl Lohmann, fictional German detective

== See also ==
- 1820 Lohmann, an asteroid
- Lohmann Brown, an egg-laying chicken
- Shade-Lohmann Bridge, a bridge over the Illinois River
- Lohman (disambiguation)
