= Luman =

Luman may refer to:

- Luman (name), a list of people with the given name or surname
- Luman Land District, a land district (cadastral division) of Western Australia
- Luman, Iran, a village

== See also ==
- Luman Andrews House, built in 1745
- Lumen (disambiguation)
- Loman (disambiguation)
