= Hodge Hall =

- U.S. National Register of Historic Places
- U.S. Historic district – Contributing property
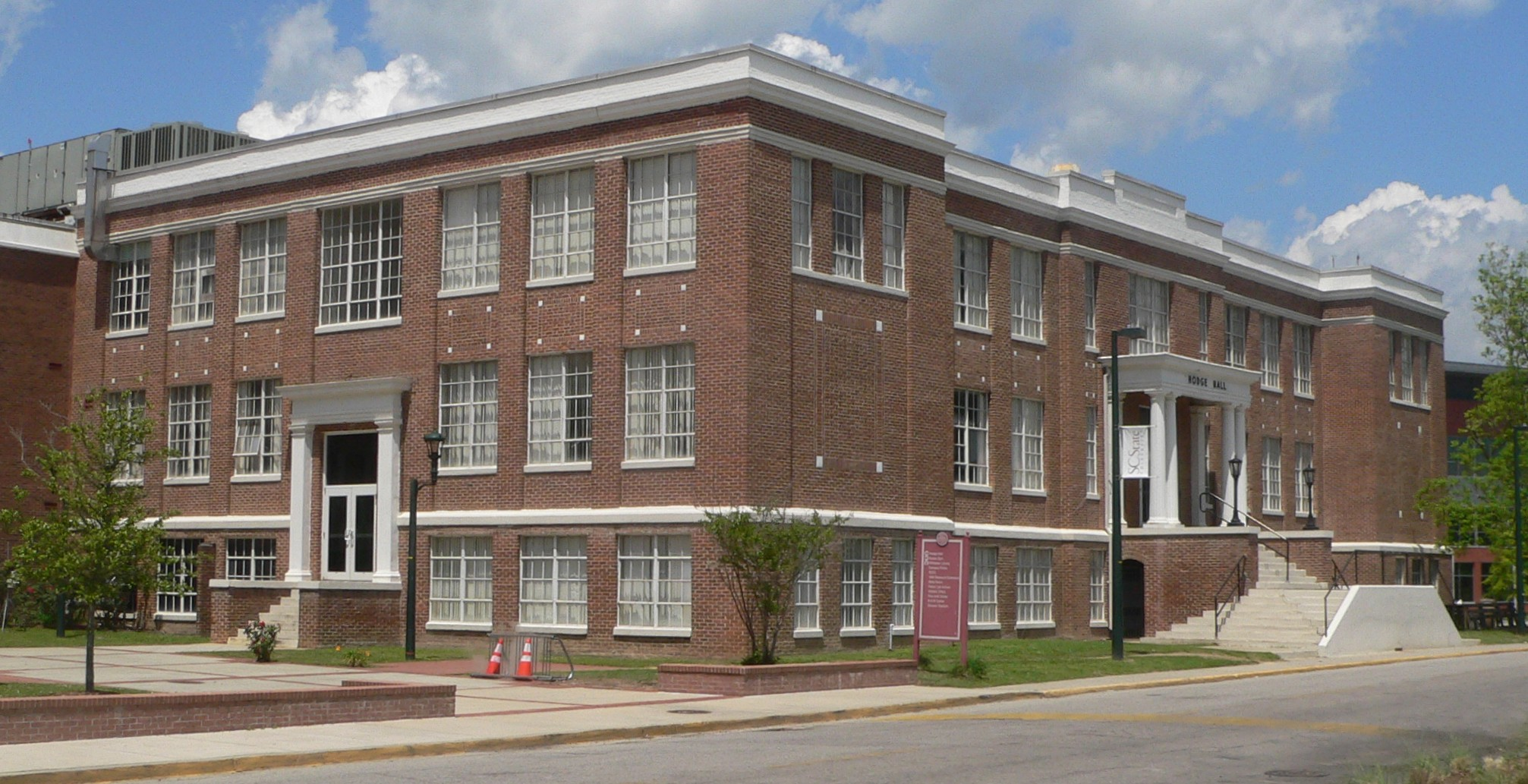

- Location within South Carolina Location within the United States
- Location: South Carolina State College campus, Orangeburg, South Carolina
- Coordinates: 33.497615°N 80.851643°W
- Built: 1928
- Architect: Whittaker, Miller F.
- Architectural style: Palladian
- MPS: Orangeburg MRA
- NRHP reference No.: 85002320
- Added to NRHP: September 20, 1985

Hodge Hall is a historic academic building located on the campus of South Carolina State University at Orangeburg, Orangeburg County, South Carolina. It was built in 1928 in the Palladian style. It is a two-story, nine nay, brick building with a full basement, a flat roof and a parapet. The front facade features a flat-roofed portico with paired fluted columns and pilasters. The building has two large, modern brick rear additions.

It was added to the National Register of Historic Places in 1985. It is located included in the South Carolina State College Historic District.
