= South Carolina State College Historic District =

Historic district in South Carolina, United States

- U.S. National Register of Historic Places
- U.S. Historic district
- Location within South Carolina Location within the United States
- Location: 300 College St., Orangeburg, South Carolina
- Coordinates: 33°29′46″N 80°51′11″W
- Area: 15 acres (6.1 ha)
- Built: 1949
- Architect: Multiple
- Architectural style: International Style
- MPS: Civil Rights Movement in Orangeburg County MPS
- NRHP reference No.: 96001024
- Added to NRHP: June 19, 1997

South Carolina State College Historic District is a national historic district located on the campus of South Carolina State University at Orangeburg, Orangeburg County, South Carolina. The district encompasses 10 contributing buildings, 1 contributing site, and 1 contributing object at the core of the historically black university. They were constructed between 1917 and 1950, and include a variety of architectural styles including Classical Revival and International Style. Notable buildings include the separately listed Hodge Hall and Lowman Hall, along with Home Management House, Mechanical Industries Hall, and Wilkinson Hall. Also on the campus, but located outside the district, is Dukes Gymnasium.

It was added to the National Register of Historic Places in 1997.
