= Andrew Hugine Jr. =

American academic

11th President of Alabama A&M University
- Incumbent
- Assumed office June 26, 2009

9th President of South Carolina State University
- In office 2003–2008

Personal details
- Born: June 21, 1949 (age 77) Green Pond, South Carolina, U.S.
- Education: South Carolina State University (BS, MS); Michigan State University (PhD)

Andrew Hugine Jr. is an American educator and academic administrator serving as the 11th president of Alabama A&M University. On June 26, 2009, his hiring for the role was authorised. Hugine's contract was renewed by the AAMU Board of Trustees to 2023 on June 22, 2018. Hugine was formerly president of South Carolina State University, his alma mater.

== Early life ==
Hugine was born on June 21, 1949, in Green Pond, South Carolina, an unincorporated community in Colleton County. He is the son of Andrew and Irene Short Hugine Sr. Hugine was educated in the Colleton County public school system before attending South Carolina State University, where he earned his bachelor's and master's degrees in mathematics. He later earned a PhD in Higher Education and Institutional Research from Michigan State University.

== Career ==
Hugine began his career as an instructor of mathematics at Beaufort High School in Beaufort, South Carolina, as well as serving as a graduate teaching assistant and assistant professor of institutional research at Michigan State University.

During his 30-year career at South Carolina State University, Hugine served as Director of the Special Services Program, Director of the University Year for Action Program, a Research Fellow, Assistant and Director of Institutional Self-Study, Assistant Vice President for Academic Affairs, professor of mathematics, and Interim Executive Vice President and Chief Operating Officer.

From 2003 to 2008, Hugine served as the 9th President of South Carolina State University. He was credited with the construction of a large residence facility and earnest preparations for a new School of Engineering building.

Immediately upon his appointment as the 11th President of Alabama A&M University, Hugine addressed the university's probationary status with the Southern Association of Colleges and Schools Commission on Colleges, resulting in the removal of the university from SACSCOC's sanction in December 2009.

Hugine was responsible for signing a memorandum of understanding with the Edward Via College of Osteopathic Medicine, signing a mentor-protégé agreement with NASA and Pratt & Whitney Rocketdyne, signing a memorandum of understanding with Nanjing Forestry University in China to serve as the sponsoring institution for the AAMU Confucius Institute, and established degree programs at Lawson State Community College in Birmingham, Alabama. Hugine announced his retirement from Alabama A&M University on December 2, 2020; with his retirement date set as December 31, 2021.

== Personal life ==
Hugine and his wife, Abbiegail Hamilton Hugine (a former educator and school principal) have been married for 45 years and have an adult son, Andrew Hugine III.
