= Lowman Hall, South Carolina State College =

- U.S. National Register of Historic Places
- U.S. Historic district – Contributing property
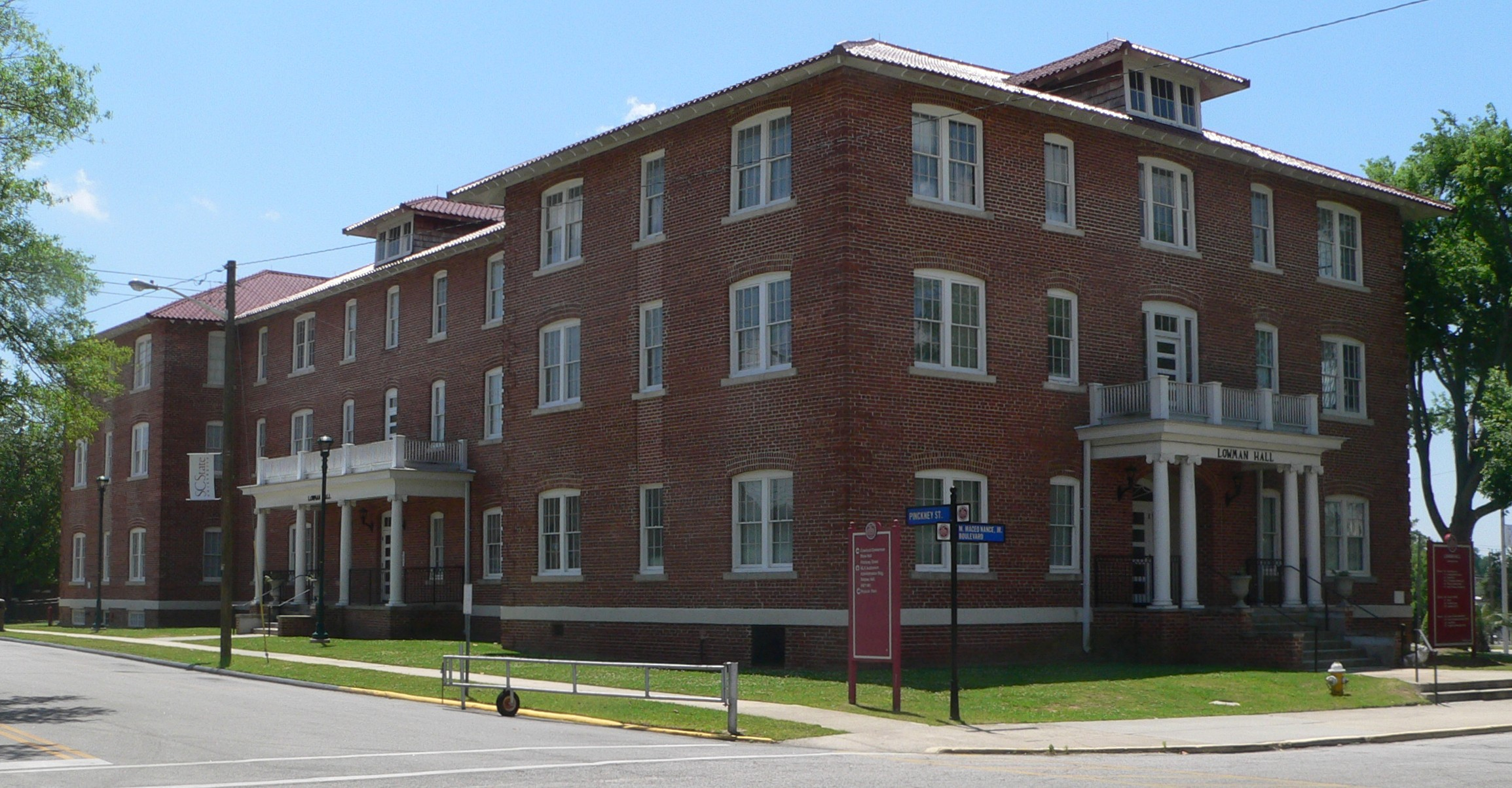

- Location within South Carolina Location within the United States
- Location: South Carolina State College campus, Orangeburg, South Carolina
- Coordinates: 33.495323°N 80.853790°W
- Built: 1917
- Architect: Miller F. Whittaker
- MPS: Orangeburg MRA
- NRHP reference No.: 85002346
- Added to NRHP: September 20, 1985

Lowman Hall is a historic academic building located on the campus of South Carolina State University at Orangeburg, Orangeburg County, South Carolina. It was built in 1917, and is a three-story, hip roofed, brick building, with projecting end pavilions. The front façade features a one-story, tetrastyle Ionic order portico. It was originally used as a men's dormitory.

It was added to the National Register of Historic Places in 1985. It is part of the South Carolina State College Historic District.
