= New York Guard =

US state defense force and NYMF branch

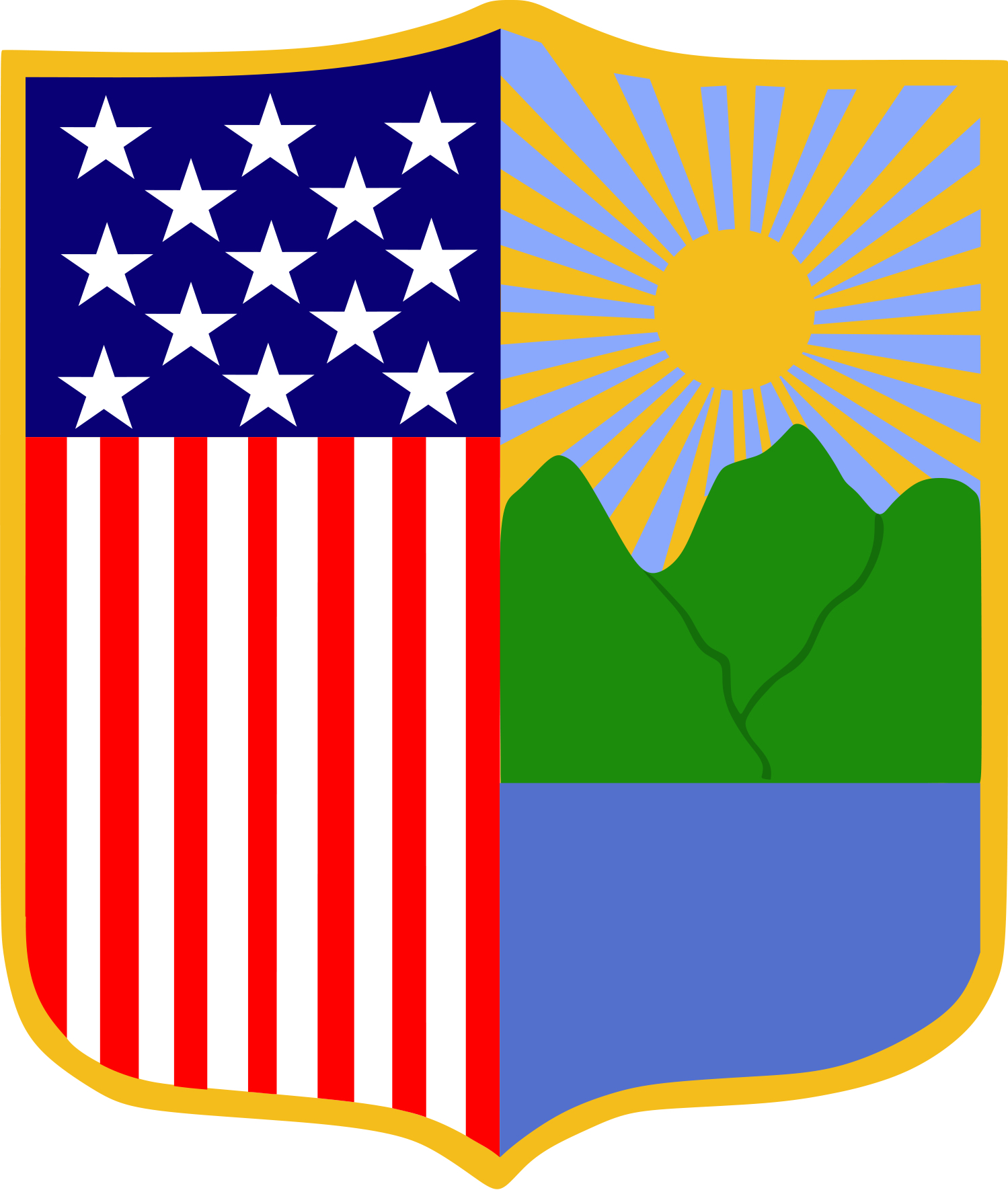
- The shoulder sleeve insignia of the New York Guard
- Active: 1917–present
- Country: United States
- Allegiance: New York
- Type: State defense force
- Role: "Reserve Land Force of NYS Organized Militia"
- Size: 400
- Part of: New York Division of Military and Naval Affairs
- NYG HQ: Camp Smith Training Site, NY
- Nickname: NYG
- Anniversaries: August 3, 1917
- Website: dmna.ny.gov/nyg/

Commanders
- Civilian Leadership: Governor Kathy Hochul (Governor of the State of New York)
- State Military Leadership: Major General Ray Shields (Adjutant General of New York) Brigadier General Peter P. Riley (Commanding General)
- Notable commanders: Lieutenant General Hugh Aloysius Drum

Insignia
- Beret flash of the New York Guard

The New York Guard (NYG) is the State Defense Force (SDF) of New York State, and is one of the four branches of the New York Military Forces (NYMF), the other three branches being the New York Army National Guard, New York Air National Guard and the New York Naval Militia. Originally called the New York State Militia, it can trace its lineage back to the American Revolution and the War of 1812.

The organization now has a unified command structure, while formerly it contained an Army Division and an Air Division. The missions of the New York Guard include augmentation, assistance, and support of the New York Army National Guard and New York Air National Guard respectively and aide to civil authorities in New York State. New York also has a New York Naval Militia which, with the State Guard and the Army and Air National Guards, is under the command of the governor of New York, the adjutant general of New York, and the Division of Military and Naval Affairs (DMNA).

The New York Guard is one of the largest organized State Defense Forces in the United States. It is historically derived from Revolutionary and Civil War era state military units that were reorganized several times in American history in response to various international and domestic crises.

Organized under the New York State Military Law, both the New York Guard & Naval Militia cannot be federalized at any time, and cannot be deployed outside New York State without the consent of the governor.

Members of the New York Guard are entitled to many of the benefits accorded members of other components of the "Organized Militia of the State of New York", the legal collective term describing the New York Army and Air National Guards, New York Naval Militia and New York Guard. These include military leave for employees of state or local governments and many private employers.

== History ==
The 265th New York State Militia was a small unit of the New York line and could trace its lineage to the War of 1812. The new regiment was given the designation, 14th regiment, which is one of the oldest military organizations in the United States because of its direct lineage through various separate companies, to the militia companies of the Dutch burghers of New Amsterdam.

In Sketches of America (1818) British author Henry Bradshaw Fearon, who visited the young United States on a fact-finding mission to inform Britons considering emigration, described New York military service as he found it in New York City in August 1817:

Every male inhabitant can be called out, from the age of 18 to 45, on actual military duty. During a state of peace, there are seven musters annually: the fine for non-attendance is, each time, five dollars. Commanding officers have discretionary power to receive substitutes. An instance of their easiness to be pleased was related to me by Mr. —, a tradesman of this city. He never attends the muster, but, to avoid the fine, sends some of his men, who answer to his name; the same man is not invariably his deputy on parade: in this, Mr. — suits his own convenience; sometimes the collecting clerk, sometimes one of the brewers, at others a drayman: and to finish this military pantomime, a firelock is often dispensed with, for the more convenient wartime weapon—a cudgel. Courts-martial have the power of mitigating the fine, on the assignment of a satisfactory cause of absence, and in cases of poverty. Upon legal exemptions I cannot convey certain information. During a period of three months in the late war, martial law existed, and no substitutes were received. Aliens were not called out.

=== Civil War era ===
For more detail, see List of New York Civil War Regiments.

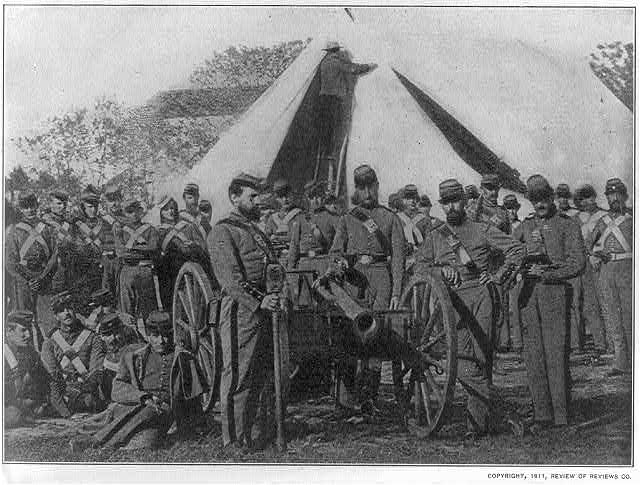
The New York Seventh in Washington, DC, 1861

Many units of the New York State Militia saw service in the American Civil War, after being activated into federal service by President Abraham Lincoln.

The activation of state militia by President Abraham Lincoln led to some conflict with State authorities in command of the units:

With the advent of the Civil War in April 1861, the 14th regiment saw its first war service in guarding the Brooklyn Navy Yard. By mid-April of that year, the "Brooklyn Chasseurs" were ready to leave New York for Washington D.C. Colonel Alfred Wood advised the Honorable Governor Morgan that the regiment was prepared to march and had accepted a three-year federal enlistment. However, the governor would not issue orders for the regiment to leave New York. While encamped at Fort Greene Park in Brooklyn, Colonel Wood and Congressman Moses O'Dell went to see President Lincoln to secure orders for the regiment to march to Washington. President Lincoln lost no time in issuing those orders to the 14th Brooklyn. When Governor Morgan learned that the regiment was preparing to march, he telegraphed Colonel Wood and inquired "by what authority" did he move his regiment, Colonel Wood coolly replied, "By the authority of the President of the United States."

Following the Civil War, efforts were made to link the varied military units in New York under overall headquarters. As a result of this, the 3rd Brigade, New York State Militia, came into being on August 5, 1886.

=== New York Guard created, 1917 ===
On 3 August 1917, the adjutant general of New York, in order to comply with the provisions of the State Constitution requiring that troops be available to the governor for the protection of life and property of the citizens of New York, organized a State Military Force known as the New York Guard. The new force replaced the New York National Guard, drafted in the service of the United States on 5 August 1917.

hAdditionally, in accordance with Special Orders No. 311, Adjutant General's Office dated 11 December 1917 a provisional brigade of the New York Guard was created from existing units, to include a brigade headquarters and the 1st and 2nd Provisional Regiments, which were ordered to active duty guarding public property. The headquarters of the brigade was located at Albany, New York. The 1st Provisional Regiment Headquarters first located at Croton Lake and later at Ossining, New York, had the mission of guarding the water supply of the City of New York, with its territory extending from the northern boundary of the city to include the entire Croton Aqueduct system. The territory assigned to the 2nd Provisional Regiment extended from Troy and Albany across the state to the international border at Niagara Falls. The Headquarters of the 2nd Provisional Regiment was located in the State Armory, Troy, New York.

During the existence of the provisional brigade, a total of 9,960 men were ordered on active duty. Discipline was maintained by enforcement of Articles of War, State Military Law & Regulations. On 1 January 1919, the strength of the NYG was approximately 22,000 officers and men.

After the armistice was signed and the Federalized New York National Guard units were returned to State status, New York Guard units were deactivated.

=== New York Guard during WWII ===
On 25 October 1940, the New York Guard was formally organized to replace Federalized New York National Guard units. The 76th Congress provided the authority for State Guards to be organized as a replacement force for the National Guard in October 1940.

The approved organization established a Headquarters, New York Guard, five (5) Brigade Headquarters and twenty (20) Regiments. New York Guard units were distributed so that at least one (1) unit was located in every one of the seventy-four (74) armories in the State.

As New York National Guard units departed for Federal service, New York Guard units were organized and mustered into State service. In 1941, the units were organized and after the first year of existence unit reports indicated the average attendance at armory drills was 83%.

During the period from 1941 to early 1944, the New York Guard was issued individual uniforms and organizational type ordinance and equipment, providing the New York Guard with sufficient support to conduct both weekly home station training and annual training for periods of 10 to 12 days duration. In 1943, the NYG gained a new commander in LTG Hugh Aloysius Drum, (until 1948). By 22 February 1944, the New York Guard attained an aggregate strength of 24,722 officers and enlisted men. On 15 June 1944, the New York State Emergency Plan Field Order No. 1 was completed and issued.

On 30 January 1945, the governor declared a state emergency caused by extraordinary heavy snow storms and freezing weather, jeopardizing the transportation of fuel and food. The New York Guard was alerted for mobilization under the provisions of Field Order No. 1. The area involved was central and western New York State. The governor directed the commanding general New York Guard to order into active service such parts of the New York Guard as necessary to facilitate movement of transportation and supplies. Assigned troops were relieved from active duty on 10–11 February 1945, & 19 February 1945. The governor, by a statewide radio broadcast, commended and congratulated the personnel of the New York Guard for their service.

Also during 1945, the State Headquarters initiated plans to reorganize the New York National Guard, effective 1 January 1946. New York Guard units would be used as the basis for this reorganization when directed to do so by the Federal Government, as the New York National Guard was not to return to State status as organized units. During 1945, twelve (12) days of field training was completed.

In 1946, a United States property and fiscal office was established within New York State, which subsequently determined that federal property assigned to the New York Guard would be utilized to equip newly organized National Guard units. During the transition from New York Guard to National Guard, an organization known as the State War Disaster Military Corp (SWDMC) was established to be available to the State, to supplement the National Guard in case of domestic disaster or disturbances. The SWDMC consisted of personnel from New York Guard units and lasted a short time and was then deactivated.

On 7 October 1946, an official National Guard troop allotment was accepted, and the New York Guard of World War II was phased out of existence by the reorganization of the National Guard.

=== New York Guard, 1950–2000 ===
In 1950, Federal legislation was again enacted authorizing states to establish State Guard units as replacement forces for the National Guard.

In 1951, after several New York National Guard units had been ordered into Federal service, the chief of staff to the governor directed planning for the reorganization of a New York Guard. New Tables of Organization were approved and published authorizing 2 Area Commands, 5 Zone Commands, 6 to 8 Group Headquarters & 35 Battalions of 4 Companies each. However, only Area and Zone Command Headquarters were organized, with a mission of preparing plans for the organization and recruitment of subordinate units, if and when a New York National Guard Division was ordered into Federal service.

By the conclusion of the Korean Emergency, the New York Guard organization was limited to a cadre staff of Headquarters, New York Guard. The mission of this cadre was to prepare plans in coordination with Civil Defense to furnish logistical support to State Military Forces in the event of a National Emergency.

Pursuant to federal legislation for the creation of State Defense Forces, enacted by the 84th Congress (1955 – Public Law 364), and State Legislation enacted in 1958, the New York Guard was reorganized as a reserve land force of the organized Militia of New York.

Through the ensuing years to 1977, the New York Guard cadre force continued to function, with its primary objective being to establish and maintain necessary plans and programs in coordination with the Division of Military and Naval Affairs to insure of a rapid and smooth mobilization to full strength if ordered to replace the New York Army National Guard.

To insure Cadre personnel at each level of command were prepared to properly respond to tasks assigned, administrative & training directives were developed and issued requiring all cadre members to attend weekly home station training drills, and to participate in scheduled annual training programs designed to test the effectiveness of training conducted at home station.

As a result of New York Guard training, over one hundred & thirty-five (135) members were placed on State Active Duty in support of the New York Army National Guard during the State Correctional Officers Strike, from 19 April to 6 May 1979.

Further, a New York Guard study conducted in mid 1979 concluded that for the New York Guard Cadre to maintain its readiness to respond to state emergencies as ordered, its tables of organization should be expanded to allow for the recruitment and assignment of personnel having professional and technical skills compatible with advancing technologies. Approval for such expansion was extended by issuance of Division of Military & Naval Affairs, Permanent Orders 66-1 dated 25 September 1979, which authorized a Command Headquarters Professional and Technical Detachment. This Detachment was subsequently reorganized as a Command Support Brigade effective 7 July 1989.

Like its forefathers, members of the New York Guard have and continue to serve in a voluntary capacity; support and participate in local and state community projects and give willingly of their time and talents to ensure that the New York Guard is prepared to fulfill its designated missions providing protection to the citizens of the State of New York.

=== New York Guard, 2001 to present ===
In the wake of the September 11, 2001, terrorist attacks, the New York Guard provided security, disaster relief, legal, communications and other services to New York City and the surrounding areas in cooperation with the National Guard. During this period, Major General John F. Bahrenburg was Commander of the New York Guard (his tenure as Commander was from 1999 to 2002).

The New York Guard experienced a resurgence after the September 11, 2001 attacks. New York Guard units were activated after the attacks, performing a variety of missions, including logistical support to forces stationed at "Ground Zero." Medical units of the Guard worked in conjunction with other DMNA forces providing care at several location including Camp Smith, in Westchester county.

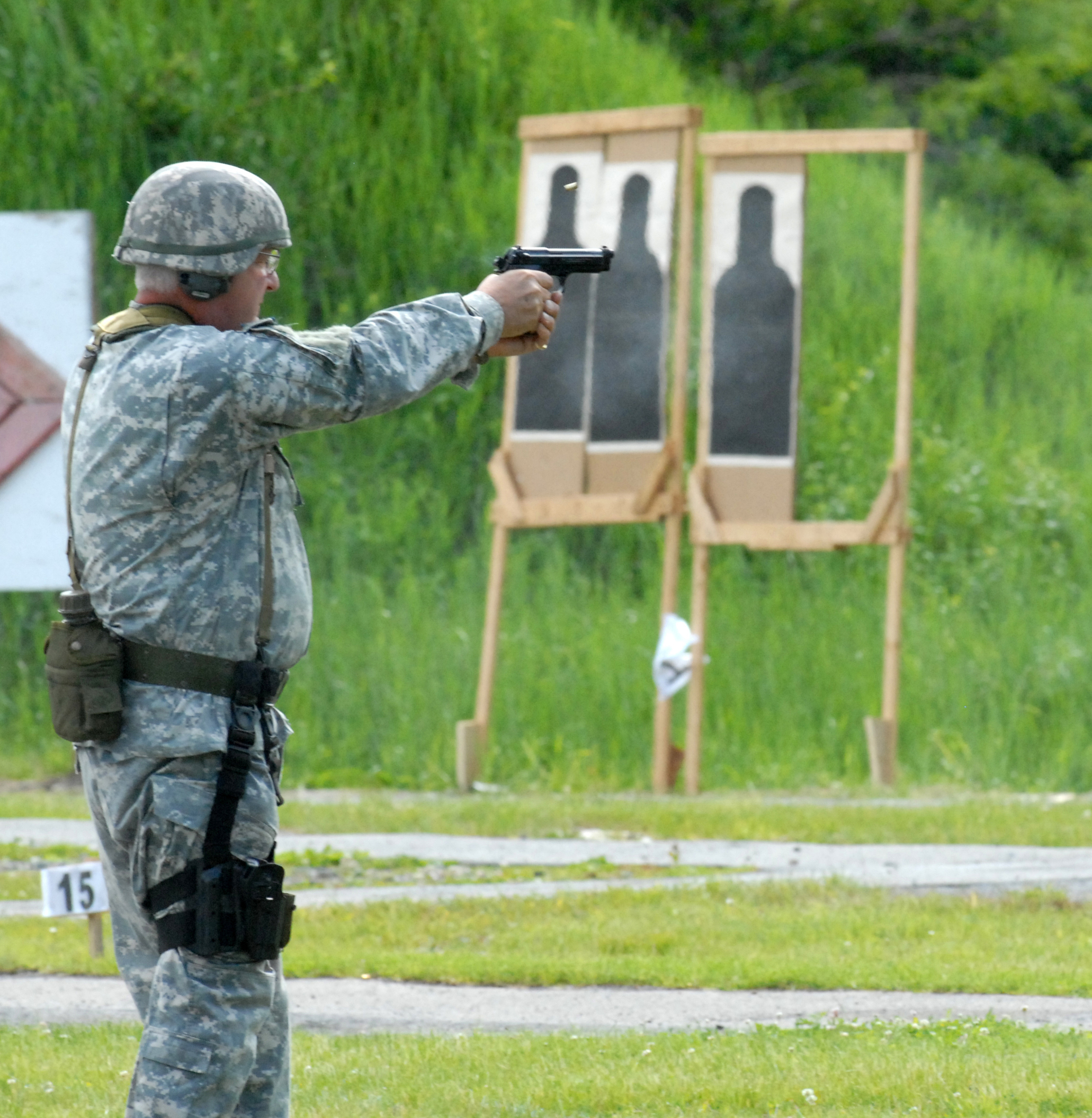
New York Guard Staff Sgt. Joseph Dee fires an M9 pistol during the 35th Annual "TAG (The Adjutant General) Match.

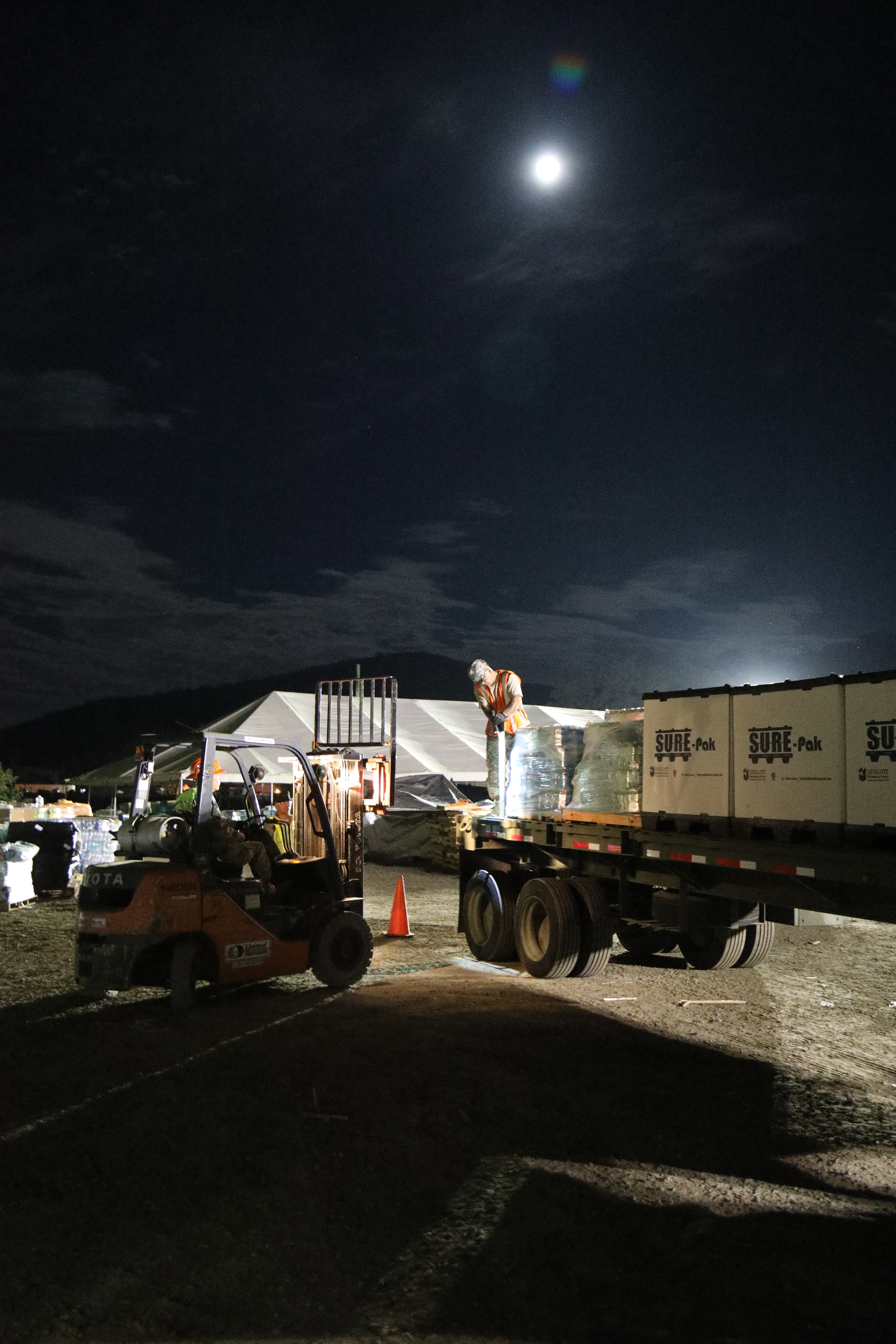
Members of the New York Guard load supplies onto a flatbed as a part of the State Active Duty mission in the Fall of 2017 Hurricane Maria deployment.

Principal occupational specialties of the New York Guard include, communications, logistics, administrative, and medical and legal services, provided in support of all components of New York State military forces, i.e., the Army and Air National Guards, Naval Militia and the New York Guard, as well as to civil authorities.

Trained and state-certified New York Guard soldiers augment and assist National Guard units in the following missions: weapons of mass destruction [WMD] decontamination – the joint New York Army National Guard / New York Air National Guard / New York Guard decontamination, or CERF, team was activated by the governor for state duty for 11 days during the 2004 Republican National Convention in New York City, Military Emergency Radio Network – the Guard is assigned to operate the MERN at various locations to ensure the free flow of information during an emergency, and search and rescue (SAR) a secondary mission to the state. New York Guard SAR teams have been mobilized, for example, in the summer of 2006 to search for a missing camper in the Adirondack Mountains preserve. Selected units and personnel of the New York Guard were called to State Active Duty with pay in response to Hurricane Irene in 2011.

2012 saw the largest deployment of the New York Guard since the September 11, 2001 attacks. Every brigade was at least partially activated for service during 'Superstorm' Sandy. New York Guard members served as equals alongside the Army National Guard, Air National Guard, and New York Naval Militia, at one point making up approximately one third of all troops in the field during a two-month deployment.

New York State Guard personnel provide training to the New York Army and Air National Guards including first aid training at Camp Smith Training Center.

The 244th Medical Group has worked with the NY Army National Guard Medical Command (MEDCOM), augmenting National Guard personnel for in-state MEDCOM missions. These have included screening of National Guard personnel in Soldier Readiness Programs.

In addition to its SAR work as a secondary mission under the New York State Defense Emergency Act and Article 2-B of State and Local, Natural and Man-Made disasters Act, engineer units of the NY Guard 10th and 65th Brigades have built facilities for the National Guard.

The New York Guard augments the capabilities of the National Guard. Guard personnel are drawn from almost every profession and areas of expertise – from plumbers to professors, clerks and CEOs, persons with long prior military service and those without, and every part of the state.

The headquarters unit of the New York Guard is located at Camp Smith, Cortlandt Manor, New York. Camp Smith is a New York State military reservation. It is adjacent to Peekskill, New York, and about 35 miles north of New York City.

In March 2020, New York Guard service members were activated to support National Guard efforts at combating the coronavirus pandemic. State guardsmen were activated to serve in essential command and control roles to support operations throughout New York State. In total, over 185 New York Guard members served as part of the Joint Task Force tasked with various civil support operations including supporting testing and vaccination centers, warehouse operations, nursing home support missions, and logistic support.

== Structure ==
The New York Guard has recently undergone a force reorganization aimed at increasing overall service member availability for State Active Duty. The current structure of the NYG follows a model akin to US Army Civil Affairs commands with units (referred to as Companies) composed of platoons and led by a command team of majors (company commanders) and a company first sergeant.

The New York Guard is currently organized as follows as of August 2025:

- New York Guard Headquarters (NYG HQ) located at Camp Smith, Cortlandt Manor
  - 56th Company (Upstate New York)
  - 88th Company (NYC, Long Island)
  - 8th Training Command (Camp Smith, NY)

== Enlistment criteria ==
=== Eligibility ===
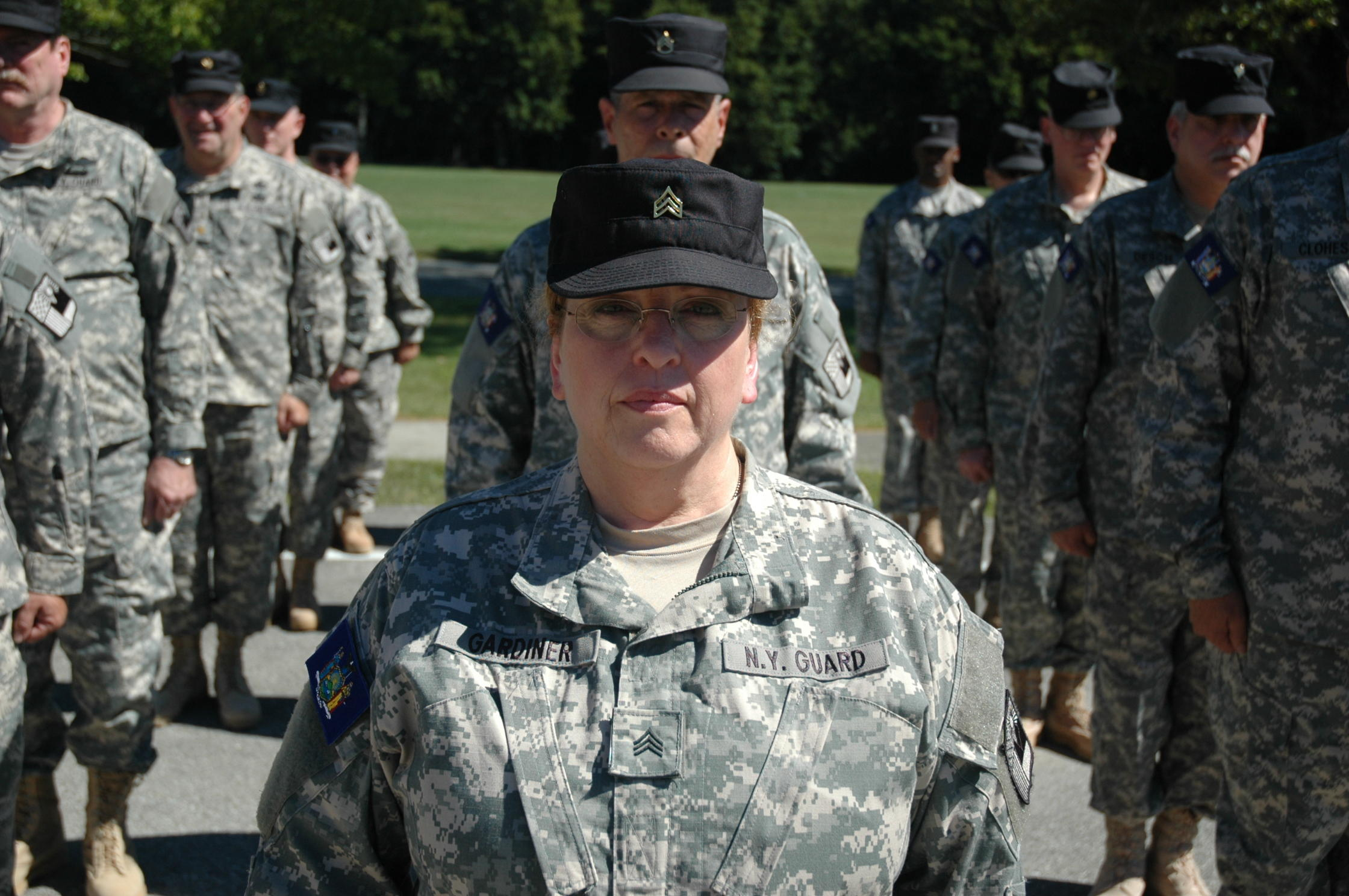
The New York Guard conducts annual training at Camp Smith.

To join, an applicant must be between 18 and 55 years of age, a citizen of the United States, and successfully pass a medical health screening and background check. Potential recruits work with NYG Recruiters to ensure that they meet eligibility requirements, and must commit to a minimum enlistment period of three years.

== Awards and decorations ==
New York Guard personnel are eligible to receive both New York State and New York Guard awards and decorations. The New York Guard issues several awards.

New York Guard (NYG) awards:

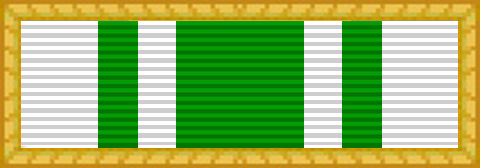
- NYG Commander's Citation
- NYG Achievement Medal
- NYG Good Conduct Medal
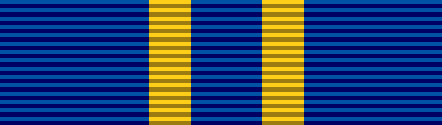
- NYG Operations Support Medal
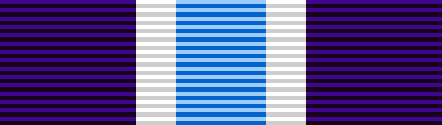
- NYG Service Ribbon
- NYG Distinguished Graduate Ribbon
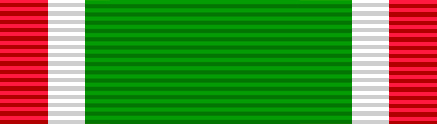
- First Provisional Regiment Medal

Descriptions of New York State awards and decorations can be found at the New York State Division of Military and Naval Affairs website: dmna.ny.gov.

== See also ==
- Brigadier General Amos M. Gailliard Jr.
- 71st Infantry Regiment (New York)
- 369th Infantry Regiment (United States) "Harlem Hellfighters" (formerly 15th NYNG)
- State Defense Forces
- List of United States militia units in the American Revolutionary War
