= Teuvo Loman =

Finnish hairdresser and model

Teuvo Loman (born 17 July 1962 in Espoo, Finland) is a Finnish hairdresser, model, fashion designer and singer living in Helsinki.

Loman has done his life-work as stylist and hairdresser. It has been possible to see work of his hands in several television shows. Example guests in Finland's independence day parties in Presidential Palace has also used clothes designed by Loman. Loman has also visited as himself in many Finnish television programmes like V.I.P. Seikkailu, W-tyyli, Levyraati, Bettina S and Ruben & Joonas.

Loman published his first album in 1988 but "Helsinki City Boy", brought him to the top lists in 2005. Loman published his next single "Kari" in May 2007, which is a translation of the "Carrie", a hit song by Europe.
