= Lohman Block =

- U.S. National Register of Historic Places
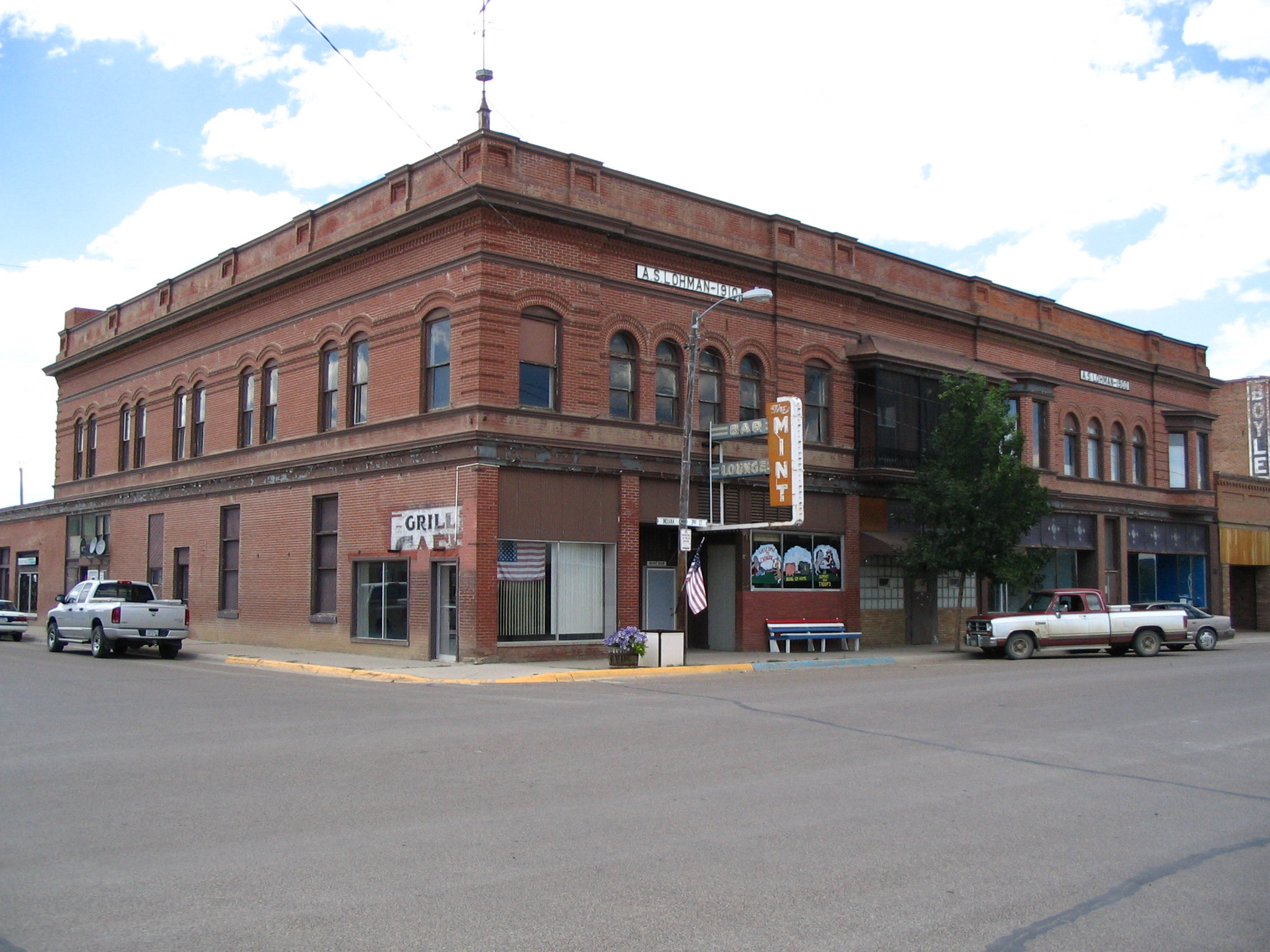
- Lohman Building

- Location within Montana Location within the United States
- Location: 239 to 225 Indiana Street, Chinook, Montana
- Coordinates: 48°35′35″N 109°13′49″W
- Built: 1900, addition in 1910
- MPS: Lohman Block
- NRHP reference No.: 80002399
- Added to NRHP: March 19, 1980

The Lohman Block is a site on the National Register of Historic Places located in Chinook, Montana. It was added to the register on March 19, 1980. The building previously housed a department store.

The building is named for businessman and rancher Andrew S. Lohman who built the block. Originally a general merchandise store, with living quarters, the 1910 two-storey addition added several other businesses. The large brick building spurred commercial growth in early Chinook.
