= Loman (surname) =

Loman is a surname. Notable people with the surname include:

- Abraham Dirk Loman (1823–1897), Dutch theologian
- Berger Loman (1886–1968), US Army soldier awarded the Medal of Honor for his actions in World War I
- Bram Lomans (born 1975), Dutch field hockey player
- Dorine Loman (born 1960), Dutch cricketer
- Doug Loman (born 1959), American retired baseball player
- Gabriël Lomans, Dutch wheel gymnast
- Harry Loman (c.1881–aft.1973), British stage performer and comic
- Jamai Loman (born 1986), Dutch pop singer, winner of the first series of Idols, the Dutch variant of Pop Idol
- Judy Loman (born 1936), American-Canadian harpist and harp teacher
- Madeleine Loman (born 1967), Dutch cricketer
- Rudolf Loman (1861–1932), Dutch chess master, son of Abraham Dirk Loman
- Rupert Loman (born 1983), British co-founder (with brother Nick) and current CEO of Gamer Network
- Teuvo Loman (born 1962), Finnish hairdresser, model, fashion designer and singer

Fictional characters include:

- Willy Loman, protagonist of the 1949 play Death of a Salesman by Arthur Miller
- David Loman, titular character of a 2013 Taiwanese movie

== See also ==
- Julian Looman (born 1985), Dutch-Austrian musical and film actor
- Justin Loomans (born 1975), Australian rugby player
