= Loman, Afghanistan =

Residential area in Afghanistan

Loman لومان
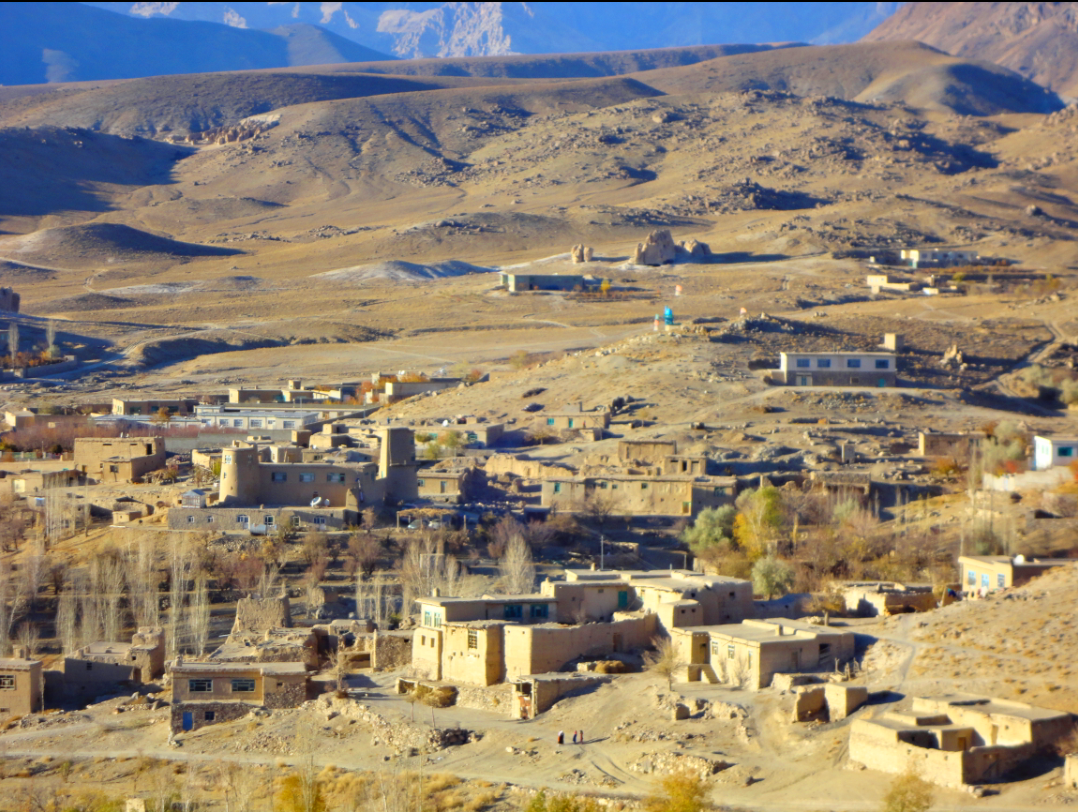
- Loman skyline

- Location in Afghanistan
- Coordinates: 33.134°N 67.643°E
- Country: Afghanistan
- Province: Ghazni
- District: Jaghori
- Time zone: + 4.30

Loman (Dari: لومان) is a residential area in Afghanistan, located in Jaghori District of Ghazni Province.

== See also ==
- List of populated places in Afghanistan
