= David Lowman (intelligence official) =

National Security Agency officer and author

David Daniel Lowman (1921-1999) was a National Security Agency employee, an expert witness in the case that overturned Hirabayashi v. United States, and the author of the posthumously published book MAGIC: The Untold Story of U.S. Intelligence and the Evacuation of Japanese Residents from the West Coast during World War II.

== Biography ==
Lowman was a career officer in the National Security Agency. In the 1970s Lowman worked on the declassification of World War II Japanese cable traffic decrypted by the Magic program. Based on his reading of those cables, he criticized the Commission on Wartime Relocation and Internment of Civilians for its conclusion that there had been "no military necessity" in relocating Japanese-Americans into internment camps. In 1985, in a court case brought by Gordon Hirabayashi to clear his wartime conviction for refusing to report for relocation, Lowman testified that the United States government had intercepted and decrypted signal traffic from Japan directing officials in the United States to organize spy networks using Japanese-Americans as agents. The court decided in favor of Hirabayashi. Lowman died in April 1999.

== Posthumous book ==
Lowman's book MAGIC: The Untold Story of U.S. Intelligence and the Evacuation of Japanese Residents from the West Coast during World War II was published posthumously in 2001. Magic argued that the internment of Japanese Americans was justified based on intercepted communications that indicated a spy network operating on the American West Coast. The book was published by Lee Allen, a retired Army lieutenant colonel and activist who convinced the Smithsonian Institution to revise downward its estimates of medals and honors awarded to Japanese-American soldiers in World War II. Allen also wrote the book's foreword, in which he claimed that for Japanese-Americans during World War II, "evacuation and life under government care provided much needed relief from trials and threats they faced on the West Coast". Magic particularly criticized the Civil Liberties Act of 1988, which offered reparations to surviving Japanese-American internees.

Writing for Military Review, Richard Milligan concluded that Magic "refutes the accepted history that the evacuation was solely the result of national leaders' 'racism, war hysteria and the lack of political will'". Publishers Weekly agreed that the book's discussion of decrypted Japanese communications "makes a solid case that the intelligence community's faith in its credibility contributed significantly to the government's decision" but also noted that book did not actually refute the claims of racism, digressing instead into technical details and "bitter critique of the 1988 decision to compensate the former prisoners". Jonathan Kirsch of the Los Angeles Times praised the book for being "intellectually honest enough to allow us to come to our own conclusions", particularly in its inclusion of a rebuttal from the general counsel for the Commission on Wartime Relocation and Internment of Civilians, but also suggested that "it is possible to read the MAGIC intercepts and come away with an entirely different impression of the evidence".

== Bibliography ==
- Magic: The Untold Story of U.S. Intelligence and the Evacuation of Japanese Residents from the West Coast during World War II, Athena Press, 2001, ISBN 9780960273614
