= Peter Booth (priest) =

David Herbert "Peter" Booth MBE QHC (26 January 1907 – 24 March 1993) was the Archdeacon of Lewes from 1959 to 1971 and Headmaster of Shoreham Grammar School from 1972 to 1977.

Booth was educated at Bedford School and Pembroke College, Cambridge. He began ordained ministry as a curate at All Saints' Hampton after which he was chaplain of Tonbridge School from 1935 to 1940. Following World War II service in the RNVR he was Rector of Stepney from 1945 to 1953 and Vicar of Brighton from 1953 to 1959. He was also an Honorary Chaplain to the Queen.

Church of England titles
Preceded by Lloyd Morrell	Archdeacon of Lewes; 1959–1971	Succeeded by Max Godden
