= Edward More (churchman) =

Edward More (1480–1541) was an English churchman and educator, Archdeacon of Lewes from 1527 to 1541.

== Life ==
Described as of Havant, he was elected a scholar of Winchester College in 1492. He went on to New College, Oxford, and supplicated for the degree of B.D. in 1518. From 1498 to 1502, he held a fellowship at Winchester and was head-master from 1508 to 1517. He was at a later date appointed canon of Chichester Cathedral, was instituted vicar of Isleworth on 3 March 1514–15, and on resigning that living in August 1521, became rector of Cranford.

On 29 October 1526, More was admitted the eighth warden of Winchester College, and held that office, together with the rectory of Cranford, till his death. From 1528 to 1531, he was also archdeacon of Lewes. As a schoolmaster, he was reckoned a stern disciplinarian. In the Latin poem descriptive of the wardens of Winchester (in Richard Willes's Poemata, 1573), Christopher Johnson wrote:

Qui legit hic Morum, qui non et sensit eundem,
Gaudeat, et secum molliter esse putet.

(Translation: "He who reads More here, and has not felt him, let him rejoice, and think himself well off".) As a pedagogue, he carried on the traditions of William Horman; in religion, he passed the baton to another conservative Catholic, John White, who followed him as headmaster and as warden.

More died in 1541 and was buried in the choir of Winchester College Chapel.

Church of England titles
Preceded by Anthony Wayte	Archdeacon of Lewes; 1527–1542	Succeeded by John Sherry
