= Ernest Reid =

Ernest Gordon Reid was the Archdeacon of Hastings from 1938 until 1956.

Reid was from Cuckfield; educated at Harrow School, Pembroke College, Oxford; and Wells Theological College; and ordained deacon in 1909, and priest in 1910. After a curacy at St Anthony, Stepney he was Chaplain of Oxford House, Bethnal Green, 1912 then Vicar of St Peter's in the same area. He was Rector of Sedlescombe with Whatlington from 1920 to 1926; and Vicar of Holy Trinity, Hastings from 1926 to 1938. He died on Christmas Day 1966.

Church of England titles
Preceded by Arthur Alston	Archdeacon of Hastings; 1938–1956	Succeeded by Guy Mayfield
