= Peter Booth =

Peter Booth may refer to:

- Peter Booth (painter) (born 1940), Australian painter
- Peter Booth, Baron Booth, British businessman and Conservative life peer
- Peter Booth (priest) (1907–1993), British Anglican priest and Archdeacon of Lewes
- Peter Booth (cricketer) (born 1952), British cricketer
- Peter H. Booth, American politician who served in the Arkansas House of Representatives

== See also ==
- Peter Booth Wiley (born 1942), American businessman and academic
