= Henry King (poet) =

English poet

The Right Reverend Henry King
- Bishop of Chichester
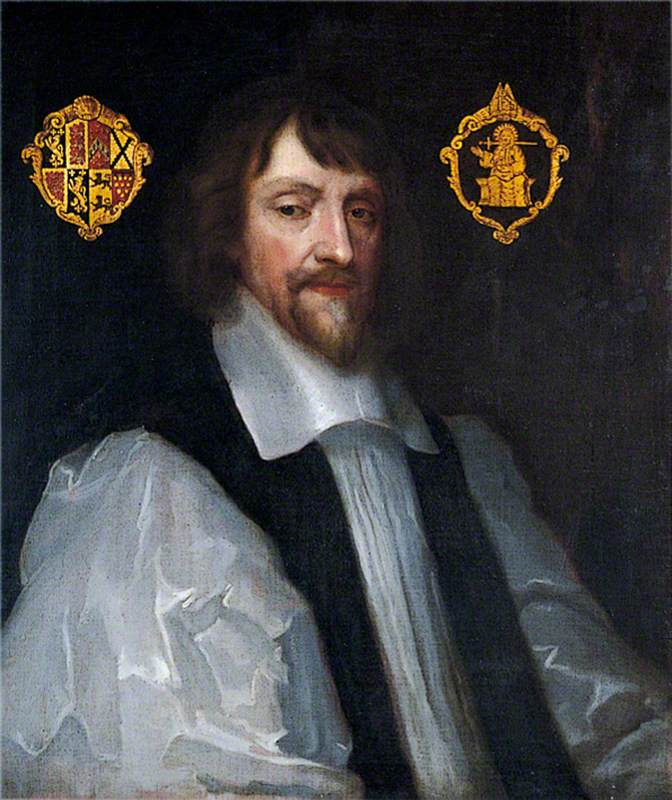
- Church: Church of England
- Diocese: Diocese of Chichester
- Elected: 1642
- Term ended: 1646–1660 (abolished); 1669 (death)
- Predecessor: Brian Duppa
- Successor: Peter Gunning
- Other post: Dean of Rochester (1639–1642)

Orders
- Consecration: 6 February 1642 by William Juxon

Personal details
- Born: baptized 16 January 1592 Worminghall, Buckinghamshire
- Died: 30 September 1669 (aged 77) Chichester
- Buried: Chichester Cathedral
- Denomination: Anglican
- Parents: John King (Bishop of London)
- Profession: Clergyman, poet
- Education: Lord Williams's School; Westminster School
- Alma mater: Christ Church, Oxford

Henry King (1592 – 30 September 1669) was an English poet who served as Bishop of Chichester.

== Life ==
The elder son of John King, Bishop of London, and his wife Joan Freeman, he was baptised at Worminghall, Buckinghamshire, 16 January 1592. He was educated at Lord Williams's School, Westminster School and in 1608 became a student of Christ Church, Oxford. With his brother John King he matriculated 20 January 1609, and was admitted (19 June 1611 and 7 July 1614) to the degrees of bachelor and master of arts. On 24 January 1616 he was collated to the prebend of St. Pancras in St. Paul's Cathedral, receiving at the same time the office of penitentiary or confessor in the cathedral, together with the rectory and patronage of Chigwell, Essex. He was made archdeacon of Colchester on 10 April 1617, and soon afterwards received the sinecure rectory of Fulham, in addition to being appointed one of the royal chaplains. All these preferments he held until he was advanced to the episcopal bench.

Late in 1617 he preached a sermon at Paul's Cross. About this time King married Anne, eldest daughter of Robert Berkeley, esq., and granddaughter of Sir Maurice Berkeley. There were four or five children of the marriage, but only two survived. His wife died about 1624 at age 24, and was buried in St. Paul's Cathedral. Her death is the subject of his poem The Exequy.

He was a close friend of John Donne, who made him one of his executors, and presented him with his sermons in manuscript, and notes from his reading on over 1400 authors. Other friends were Ben Jonson, George Sandys, Sir Henry Blount, and James Howell. His friendship with Izaak Walton began about 1634, and was lifelong.

After his father's death, on Good Friday 1621, a rumour circulated that he had died in communion with the church of Rome. This was the subject of a two pamphlets attributed to Richard Broughton and George Musket. King preached a sermon refuting this claim on 25 November 1621. He was made canon of Christ Church 3 March 1624, and his brother John was made canon in the following August. On 19 May 1625 they were admitted to the degrees of B.D. and D.D.

On 6 February 1639 he was made Dean of Rochester, and on 6 February 1642, the day after the House of Lords had passed the bill to deprive the bishops of their votes, he became Bishop of Chichester; he was also presented to the rectory of Petworth in Sussex. He was residing at his episcopal palace when Chichester surrendered to the parliament in 1643, and his library was seized. He was deprived of the rectory of Petworth, which was given by parliament to Francis Cheynell, and by a resolution of the House of Commons, 27 June 1643, his estates were ordered to be sequestrated. From 1643 to 1651 he lived in the house of his brother-in-law, Sir Richard Hobart of Langley, Buckinghamshire. He was deprived of his See by Parliament on 9 October 1646, as episcopacy was abolished for the duration of the Commonwealth and the Protectorate.

Shortly afterwards King retired to Ritchings, near Langley, the residence of Lady Anne Salter (supposed to be the sister of Brian Duppa), where other members of the King family and John Hales of Eton found refuge. In 1659 King was engaged in negotiations for supplying the vacant bishoprics, and was reinstated at the Restoration (by 20 June 1660), returning to Chichester. On 20 May 1661 he preached at Whitehall, and on 24 April 1662 he delivered an impressive funeral sermon on Bishop Duppa at Westminster Abbey. King died at Chichester 30 September 1669, and was buried in Chichester Cathedral, where the widow of his son John erected a monument to his memory and that of her husband. His second son, Henry, died 21 February 1669; his eldest son, John, died 10 March 1671.

== Works ==
King wrote many elegies on royal persons and on his private friends, who included John Donne and Ben Jonson. A selection from his Poems and Psalms was published in 1843.

=== The "Blackmoor" poems ===
A poem by Henry Rainolds and a response by Henry King were included in several manuscript miscellanies of verse. In Rainold's poem, an African woman, described as a "Blackmoor", asks for the love of a white boy. King had the conventional views of the time and in his response, which exists in alternative versions, the boy explains that racial differences keep them apart. In King's opinion the interbreeding of races can only produce unwelcome results:

Prodigious might that union prove,
Where Night and Day together move,
And the conjunction of our lips
Not kisses make but an eclipse;
In which the mixed black and white
Portends more terrour than delight.

== Notes ==
Church of England titles
Preceded by Walter Balcanquhall	Dean of Rochester; 1639–1642	Succeeded by Thomas Turner
Preceded by Brian Duppa	Bishop of Chichester; 1642–1646 & 1660–1669	Succeeded by Peter Gunning
