= Francis Smythe =

Francis Smythe may refer to:

- Frank Smythe (Francis Sydney Smythe, 1900–1949), English mountaineer, author, photographer and botanist
- Francis Smythe (priest) (1873–1966), Archdeacon of Lewes
