= S. (Archdeacon of Lewes) =

S. was the Archdeacon of Lewes from 1207 until 1226.

Church of England titles
Preceded by Joceline	Archdeacon of Lewes; 1207–1226	Succeeded by Eustachius de Leveland
