= Toby Henshaw =

Toby Henshaw was the Archdeacon of Lewes from 1670 until his death in 1681. Born in Sussex and educated at Clare College, Cambridge, he was ordained in 1672 and held the livings at Henfield and Cuckfield. He was Treasurer of Chichester Cathedral from 1672 to his death. He was buried at Cuckfield on 25 November 1681.

Church of England titles
Preceded by Nathaniel Hardy	Archdeacon of Lewes; 1670–1681	Succeeded by Joseph Sayer
