= Thomas Birch (disambiguation) =

Thomas Birch (1705–1766) was an English historian.

Thomas Birch may also refer to:

- Thomas Birch (artist) (1779–1851), American portrait and marine painter
- Thomas Birch (New Zealand politician) (1825–1880), New Zealand politician who represented Dunedin
- Sir Thomas Birch, 2nd Baronet (1791–1880), British MP for Liverpool
- Thomas Birch (priest) (1767–1840), Archdeacon of Lewes, 1823–1840
- Thomas Birch (English Parliamentarian) (1608–1678), English politician
- Thomas Ledlie Birch (1754–1828), Presbyterian minister and radical democrat

== See also ==
- Thomas Burch (disambiguation)
