= Philip King (priest) =

Philip King (1603–1667) was an English academic and churchman, Archdeacon of Lewes from 1660 until 1667.

== Life ==
He was the fifth and youngest son of John King, the bishop of London. He matriculated at Christ Church, Oxford in 1616, at age 13, and graduated B.A. in 1618. In 1623 he was M.A, and became Fellow of Exeter College. Having been public orator, he resigned his fellowship in 1629.

King became rector of St Botolph, Billingsgate by 1636. At the outbreak of the First English Civil War his living was sequestered, and he went to Oxford. There he graduated D.D. in 1645. He spent much of his time at Langley, Buckinghamshire, where one of his sisters was married to Sir Richard Hobart.

After the Restoration in 1660, he was made treasurer of the diocese of Chichester, and became a prebendary in St Paul's Cathedral. He was made archdeacon of Lewes on 11 October 1660, and held he post until his death on 4 March 1667, at Langley.

Church of England titles
Preceded by Thomas Hook	Archdeacon of Lewes; 1660–1667	Succeeded by Nathaniel Hardy
