= Philip Jones (priest) =

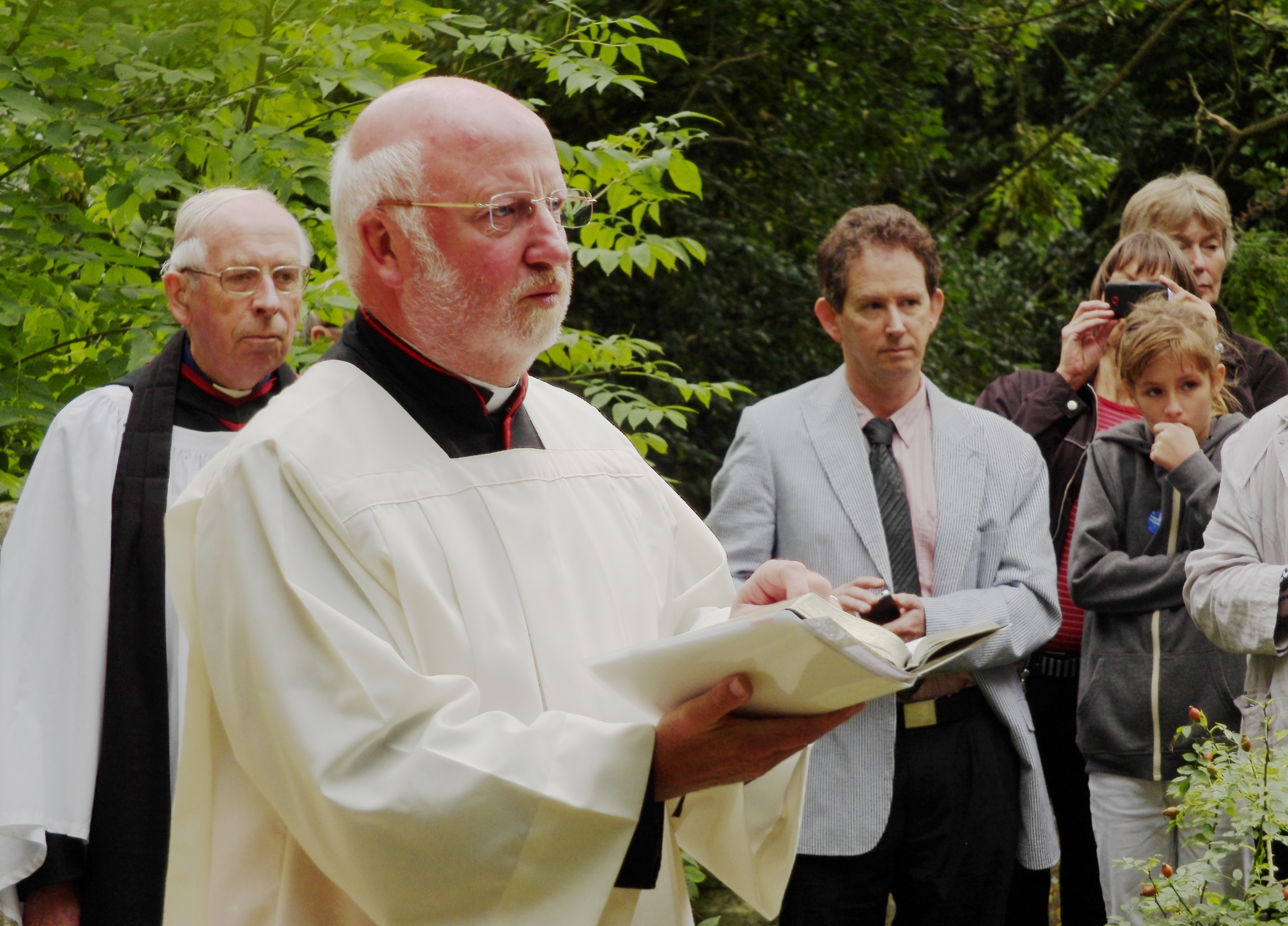
The Venerable Philip Jones, 2013

Philip Hugh Jones (born 13 May 1951) was Archdeacon of Lewes & Hastings from 2005 to 2014 and, after renaming, Archdeacon of Hastings from 2014 to 2015.

Jones was educated at The Leys School and Chichester Theological College. He was a solicitor from 1975 to 1992. He was ordained deacon in 1994, and priest in 1995. After a curacy in Horsham he was Vicar of Southwater from 1997 to 2005.

Church of England titles
Preceded by Nicholas Reade	Archdeacon of Lewes & Hastings; 2005–2015	Succeeded by Edward Dowler
