= Thomas Burch =

Thomas Burch may refer to:

- Thomas G. Burch (1869–1951), American politician
- Thomas Burch (circuit rider) (1778–1849), Methodist preacher
- Tom Burch (born 1931), American politician in the state of Kentucky

== See also ==
- Thomas Birch (disambiguation)
