= John Plemth =

John Plemth (alternative spellings include Plente, Plenth, Plenty, Plentith and Plentyth) was the Archdeacon of Lewes from 1478 until his death in 1483.

== Life ==
He was a native of Stratford-upon-Avon and educated at Eton and King's College, Cambridge. He held incumbencies at Sturminster Marshall, Beccles, Brightwalton and Hartfield. His will was dated 9 May 1483; and was proved on 23 August: he requested burial at Exeter Cathedral

== Legacy ==
Plemth founded a chantry at King's College, Cambridge, where he was bursar; he was one of a group of Fellows of the period who endowed priests to sing in King's College Chapel. For this gift of 160 marks Plente was listed as a benefactor of King's, and its terms included a requirement that he should be commemorated annually (it is not clear that he was in fact buried at Exeter, rather than King's). A bequest of his own to Sir John Atkins led to his being remembered also (will of Atkins from 1487).

Church of England titles
Preceded by Lewis Coychurch	Archdeacon of Lewes; 1478–1483	Succeeded by Simon Climping
