= Edward Dowler =

Dean of Chichester

Robert Edward Mackenzie Dowler (born 28 December 1967) is a British Anglican priest. Since September 2024, he has been the Dean of Chichester in the Church of England.

== Early life and education ==
Dowler was born on 28 December 1967 in Highgate, London, England. He was educated at Harrow School, an all-boys independent boarding school in London. He studied at Christ Church, Oxford (BA, 1989), Selwyn College, Cambridge (BA, 1993), Westcott House, Cambridge and Durham University (PhD, 2007). His doctoral thesis was titled "Songs of love: a pastoral reading of St Augustine of Hippo's Enarrations in Psalmos", and his supervisors were Graham Gould and Carol Harrison.

Edward is married to Anna Dowler, a successful journalist for The Guardian newspaper. Together, they share two children, Eleanor and Gregory.

== Ordained ministry ==
Dowler was ordained in the Church of England as a deacon in 1994 and as a priest in 1995. After curacies in London including at Christ Church, Southgate he was on the staff of St Stephen's House, Oxford from 2001 until 2009; then Vicar of Clay Hill until his appointment as archdeacon. He served as the Archdeacon of Hastings in the Diocese of Chichester from 2016 until 2024; he additionally became priest-in-charge of St John the Evangelist, Crowborough in 2020.

On 14 May 2024, it was announced that he would be the next Dean of Chichester; he was instituted on 14 September 2024.

Church of England titles
Preceded by Philip Jones	Archdeacon of Hastings; 2016–2024	TBA
Preceded by Stephen Waine	Dean of Chichester; 2024–present	Incumbent
