= Pembroke College, Cambridge =

Constituent college of the University of Cambridge

Pembroke College
- University of Cambridge
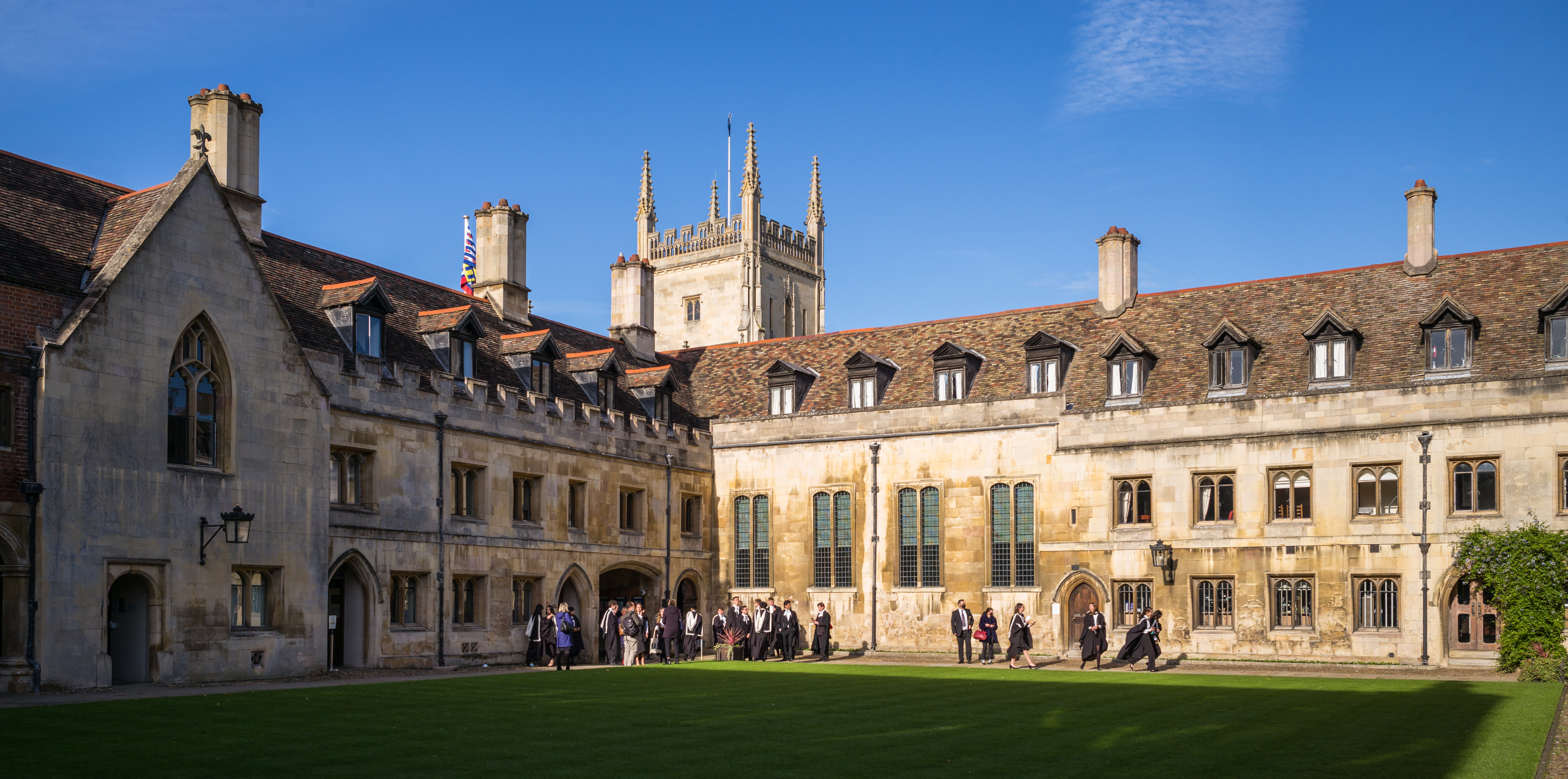
- Old Court, Pembroke College

- Arms of Pembroke College; Arms: see below
Scarf colours: dark blue, with two equally-spaced narrow Cambridge blue stripes
- Location: Trumpington Street (map)
- Coordinates: 52.202°N 0.120°E
- Full name: The College or Hall of Valence Mary (commonly called Pembroke College) in the University of Cambridge
- Abbreviation: PEM
- Founder: Marie de St Pol, Countess of Pembroke
- Established: 1347; 679 years ago
- Named after: Aymer de Valence, 2nd Earl of Pembroke
- Former names: Marie Valence Hall (1347–?); Pembroke Hall (?–1856)
- Sister college: The Queen's College, Oxford
- Master: Rosalind Polly Blakesley
- Undergraduates: 484 (2022-23)
- Postgraduates: 282 (2022-23)
- Endowment: £139.0m (2023)
- Website: pem.cam.ac.uk
- JP: pemjp.soc.srcf.net
- GP: pemgp.soc.srcf.net
- Boat club: Pembroke College Boat Club

Map
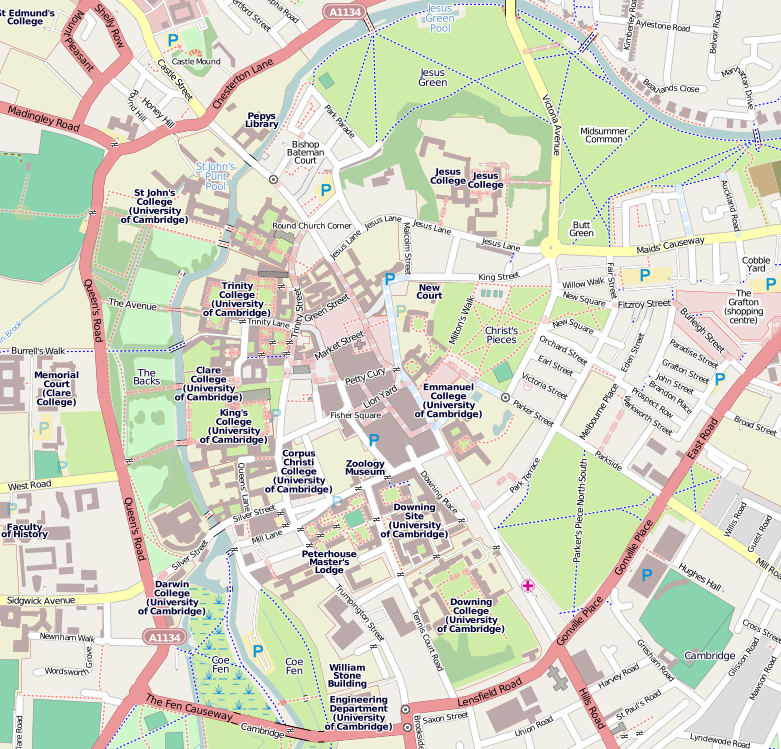
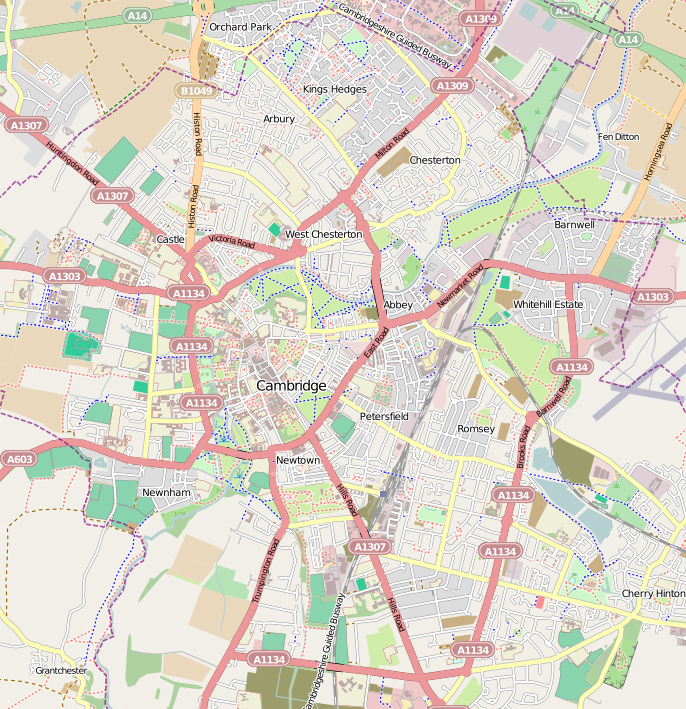
- Location within Central Cambridge Location within Cambridge

Pembroke College is a constituent college of the University of Cambridge, England. The college is the third-oldest college of the university and has more than 700 students and fellows. It is one of the university's larger colleges, with buildings from almost every century since its founding, as well as extensive gardens. Its members are termed "Valencians". The college's Master is the art historian Rosalind Polly Blakesley.

Pembroke has a level of academic performance among the highest of all the Cambridge colleges; in 2013, 2014, 2016, and 2018 Pembroke was placed second in the Tompkins Table. Pembroke contains the first chapel designed by Sir Christopher Wren and is one of only six Cambridge colleges to have educated a British prime minister, in Pembroke's case William Pitt the Younger. The college library, with a Victorian neo-gothic clock tower, has an original copy of the first encyclopaedia to contain printed diagrams.

== History ==
=== Foundation ===
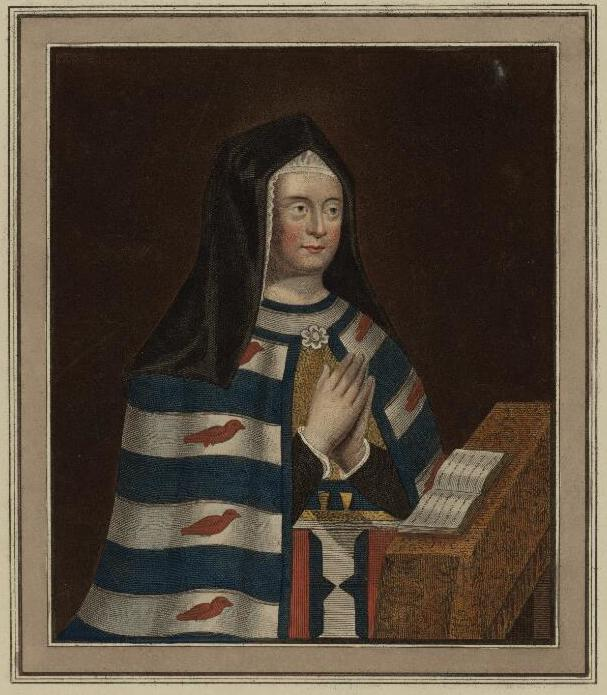
Coloured engraving of Marie de St Pol, foundress of Pembroke College, Cambridge

Marie de St Pol, Countess of Pembroke (1303–1377), a member of the de Châtillon family of France, founded Pembroke College, Cambridge. On Christmas Eve 1347, Edward III granted Marie de St Pol, widow of the Earl of Pembroke, the licence for the foundation of a new educational establishment in the young university at Cambridge. The Hall of Valence Mary ("Custos & Scolares Aule Valence Marie in Cantebrigg'"), as it was originally known, was thus founded to house a body of students and fellows. The statutes were notable both in that they gave preference to students born in France who had already studied elsewhere in England and in that they required students to report fellow students if they indulged in excessive drinking or visited disreputable houses.

The college was later renamed Pembroke Hall, and finally became Pembroke College in 1856.

Marie was closely involved with College affairs in the 30 years until her death and burial at Denny Abbey, to the north of Cambridge, in 1377. She seems to have been something of a disciplinarian: the original Foundation documents had strict penalties for drunkenness and lechery, required that all students' debts were settled within two weeks of the end of term, and gave strict limits on numbers at graduation parties.

=== Legacies ===
Richard Buckenham (Archdeacon of Lewes) himself a book collector ensured in 1599 before William Smarte's death, that more than 100 manuscripts in Smarte's possession were donated to Pembroke College library.

Sir Robert Hitcham, a lawyer and MP who was an alumnus of Pembroke College left Framlingham Castle in Suffolk and its associated lands to the college in 1636, a year after he bought it. Hitcham's Cloister in Pembroke College built in 1666 was named after him. The college still owns much of the estate.

In 2015, the college received a bequest of £34 million from the estate of American inventor and Pembroke alumnus Ray Dolby, thought to be the largest single donation to a college in the history of Cambridge University.

== Buildings ==
=== Old Court ===
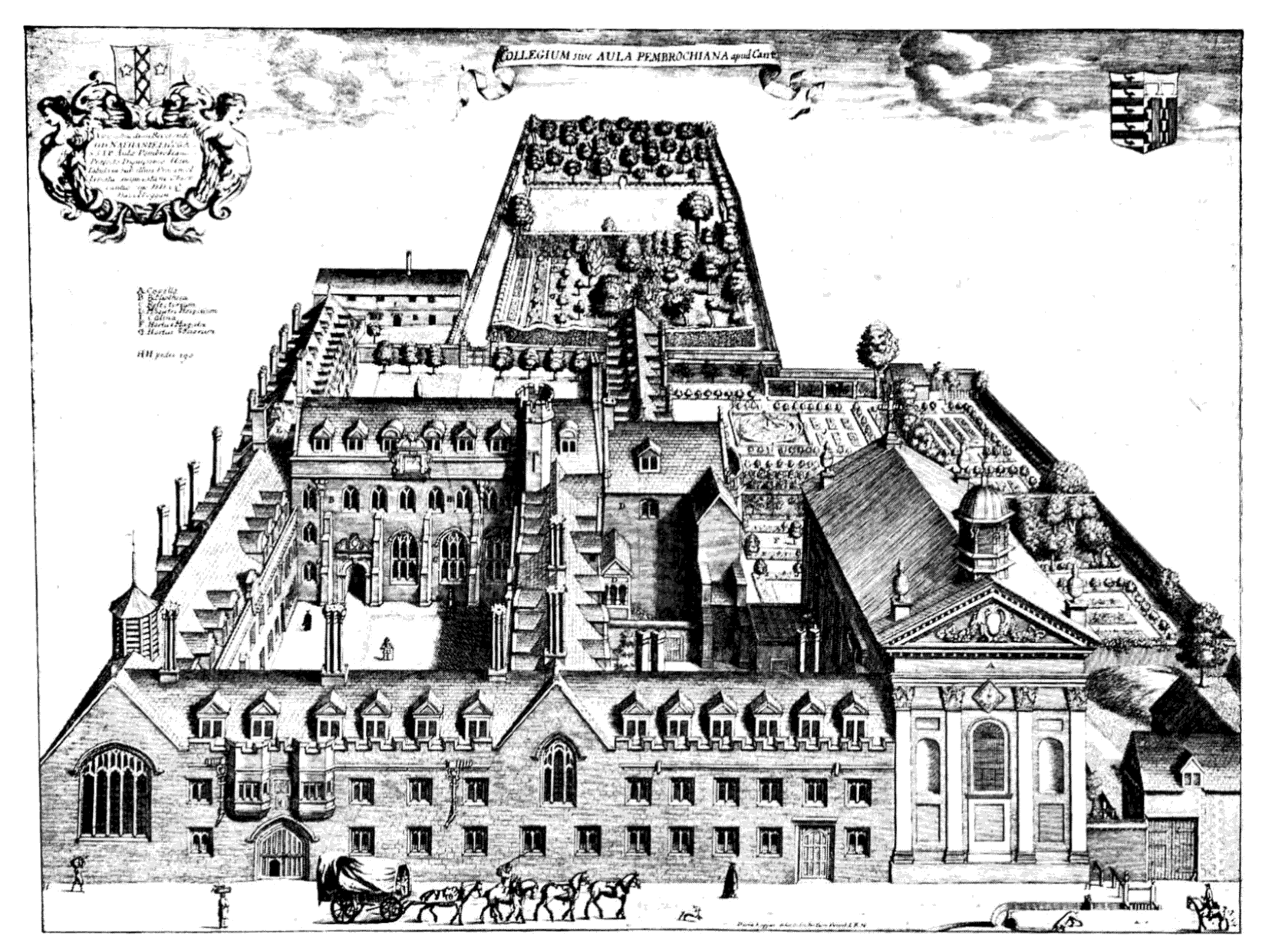
Bird's eye view of Pembroke College, Cambridge, by David Loggan, published in 1690

The first buildings comprised a single court (now called Old Court) containing all the component parts of a college – chapel, hall, kitchen and buttery, master's lodgings, students' rooms – and the statutes provided for a manciple, a cook, a barber and a laundress. Both the founding of the college and the building of the city's first college Chapel (1355) required the grant of a papal bull.

The original court was the university's smallest at only 95 feet (29 m) by 55 feet (17 m), but was enlarged to its current size in the nineteenth century by demolishing the south range.

The college's gatehouse is the oldest in Cambridge.

=== Chapel ===
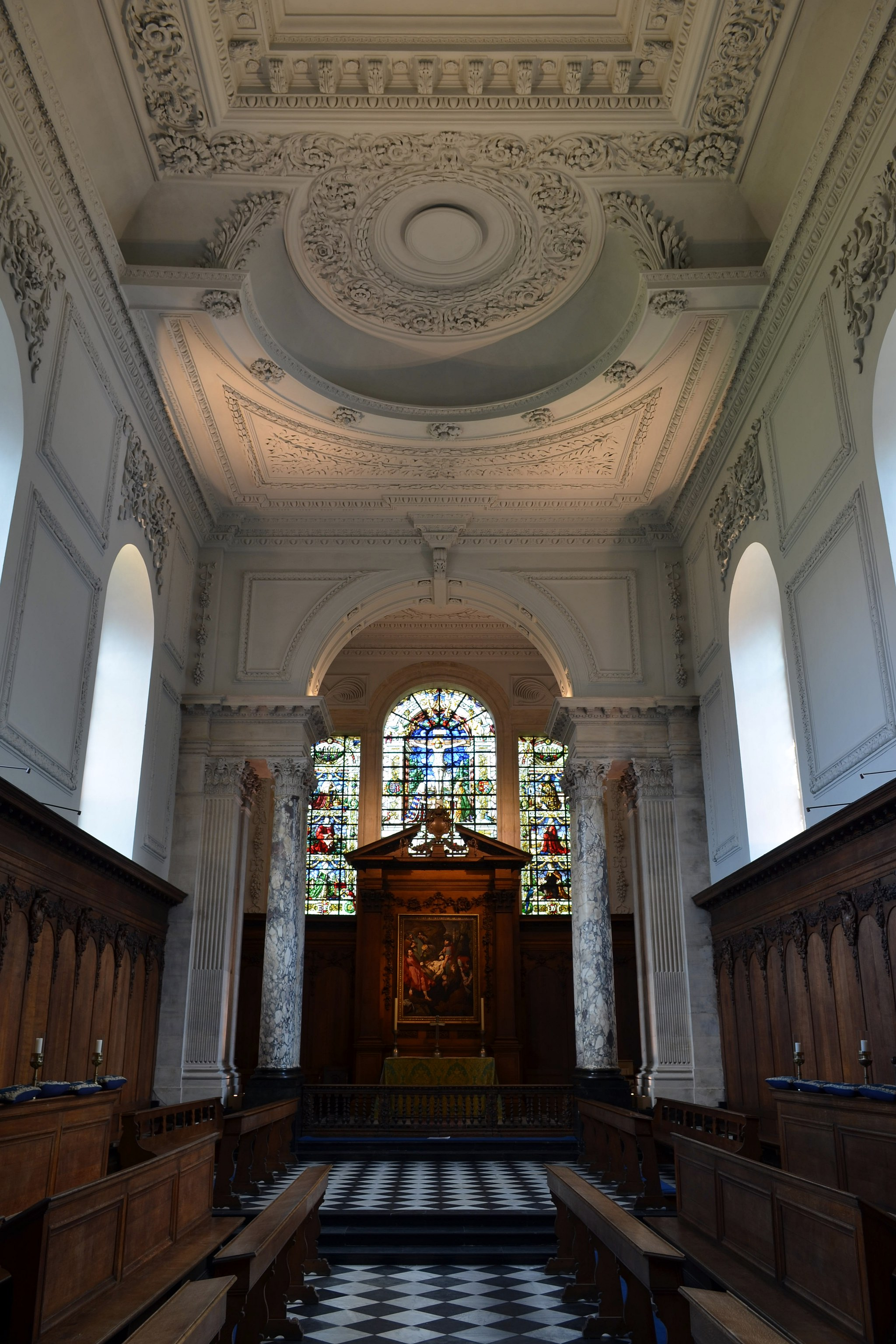
Pembroke College chapel interior in September 2014

The original Chapel now forms the Old Library and has a striking seventeenth-century plaster ceiling, designed by Henry Doogood, showing birds flying overhead. Around the Civil War, one of Pembroke's fellows and Chaplain to Charles I before he was king, Matthew Wren, was imprisoned by Oliver Cromwell. On his release after eighteen years, he fulfilled a promise by hiring his nephew Christopher Wren to build a great Chapel in his former college. The resulting Chapel was consecrated on St Matthew's Day, 1665, and the eastern end was extended by George Gilbert Scott in 1880, when it was consecrated on the Feast of the Annunciation.

=== Expansion ===
The new Pembroke College Auditorium, created from the former Emmanuel United Reform Church beside Trumpington Street

An increase in membership over the past 150 years saw a corresponding increase in building activity. The Hall was rebuilt in 1875–1876 to designs by Alfred Waterhouse after he had declared the medieval Hall unsafe. As well as the Hall, Waterhouse designed a new range of rooms, Red Buildings (1871–1872), in French Renaissance style, designed a new Master's Lodge on the site of Paschal Yard (1873, later to become N staircase), pulled down the old Lodge and the south range of Old Court to open a vista to the chapel, and finally designed a new Library (1877–1878) in the continental Gothic style. The construction of the new library was undertaken by Rattee and Kett.

Waterhouse was dismissed as architect in 1878 and succeeded by George Gilbert Scott, who, after extending the chapel, provided additional accommodation with the construction of New Court in 1881, with letters on a series of shields along the string course above the first floor spelling out the text from Psalm 127:1, "Nisi Dominus aedificat domum…" ("Except the Lord build the house, their labour is but vain that build it").

Building work continued into the 20th century with W. D. Caröe as architect. He added Pitt Building (M staircase) between Ivy Court and Waterhouse's Lodge, and extended New Court with the construction of O staircase on the other side of the Lodge. He linked his two buildings with an arched stone screen, Caröe Bridge, along Pembroke Street in a late Baroque style, the principal function of which was to act as a bridge by which undergraduates might cross the Master's forecourt at first-floor level from Pitt Building to New Court without leaving the college or trespassing in what was then the Fellows' Garden.

In 1926, as the Fellows had become increasingly disenchanted with Waterhouse's Hall, Maurice Webb was brought in to remove the open roof, put in a flat ceiling and add two storeys of sets above. The wall between the Hall and the Fellows' Parlour was taken down, and the latter made into a High Table dais. A new Senior Parlour was then created on the ground floor of Hitcham Building. The remodelling work was completed in 1949 when Murray Easton replaced the Gothic tracery of the windows with a simpler design in the style of the medieval Hall.

In 1933 Maurice Webb built a new Master's Lodge in the south-east corner of the college gardens, on land acquired from Peterhouse in 1861. Following the war, further accommodation was created with the construction in 1957 of Orchard Building, so called because it stands on part of the Foundress's orchard. Finally, in a move to accommodate the majority of junior members on the college site rather than in hostels in the town, in the 1990s Eric Parry designed a new range of buildings on the site of the Master's Lodge, with a new Lodge at the west end. Foundress Court was opened in 1997 in celebration of the college's 650th Anniversary. In 2001 the Library was extended to the east and modified internally.

In 2017, Pembroke College launched a new campaign of extension called the Time and The Place (or the Mill Lane project), on the other side of Trumpington Street. The project is to enlarge the size of the college by a third, with new social spaces, rooms and offices.

=== Gardens ===
Pembroke's enclosed grounds include garden areas. Highlights include "The Orchard" (a patch of semi-wild ground in the centre of the college), an impressive row of Plane Trees and a bowling green, re-turfed in 1996, which is reputed to be among the oldest in continual use in Europe.

=== Gallery ===
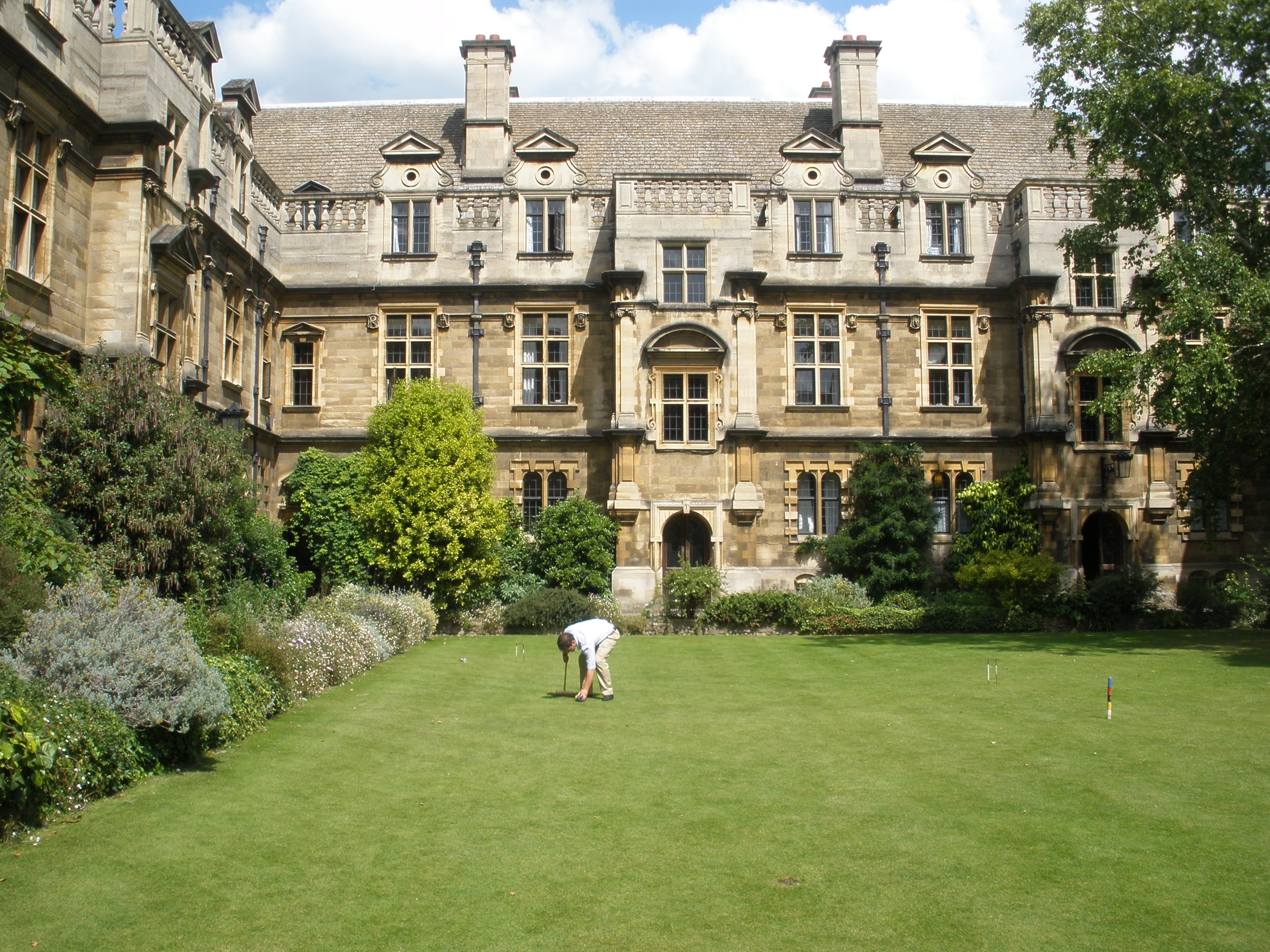
The Croquet Lawn in New Court, designed by Sir George Gilbert Scott

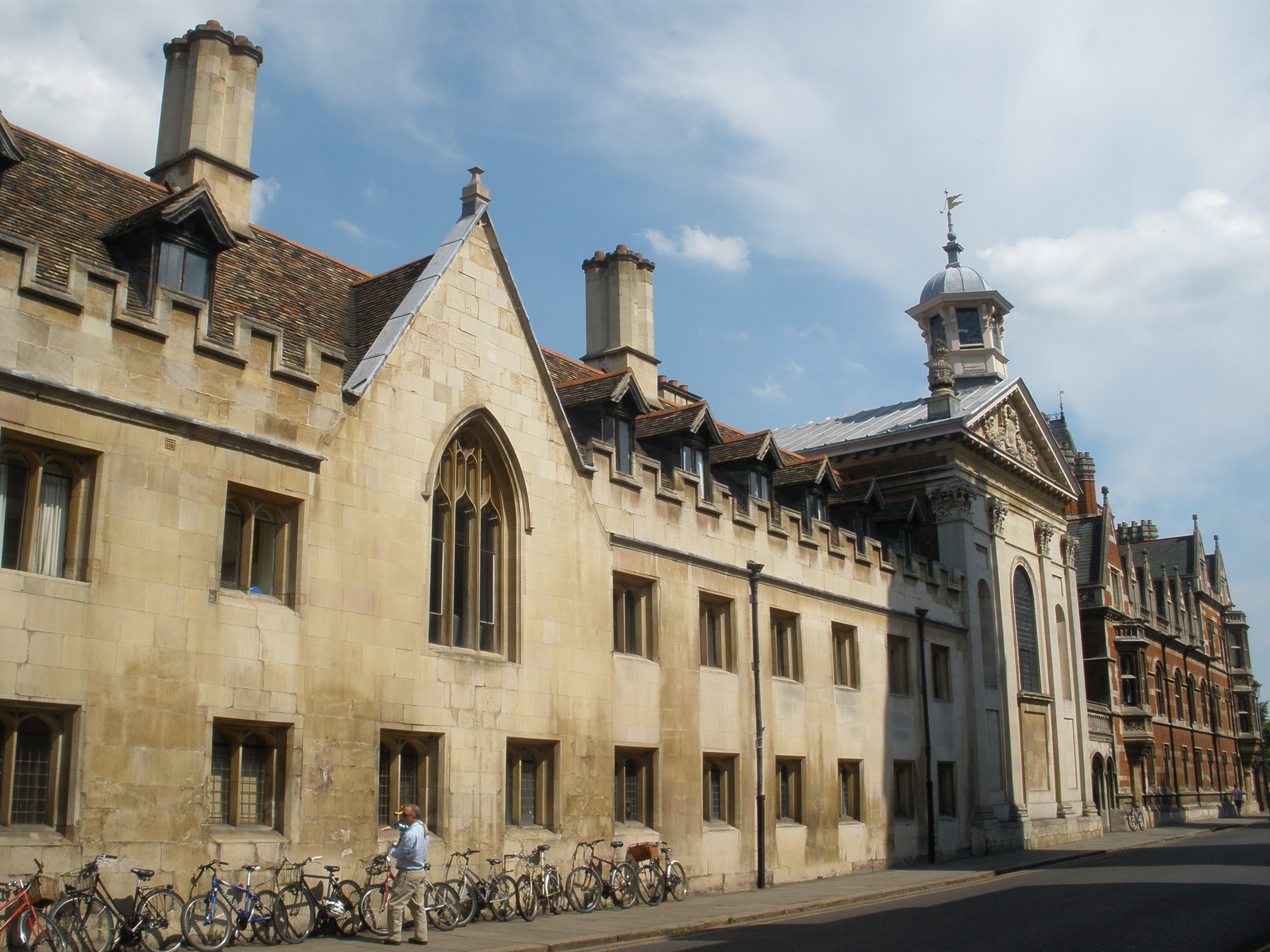
The Trumpington Street Façade with the College Chapel on the right

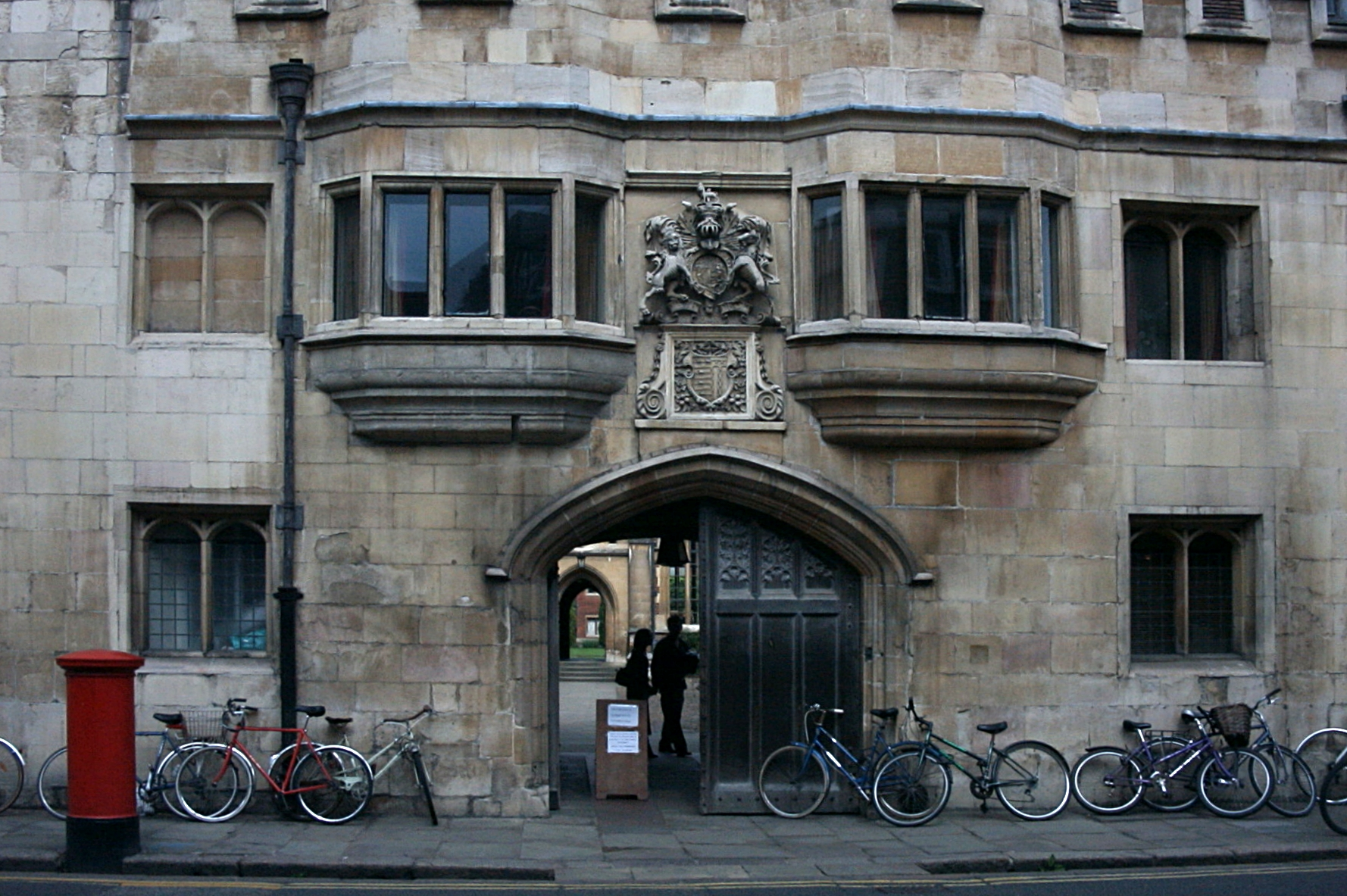
The Gatehouse is the oldest in Cambridge, dating from the 14th century

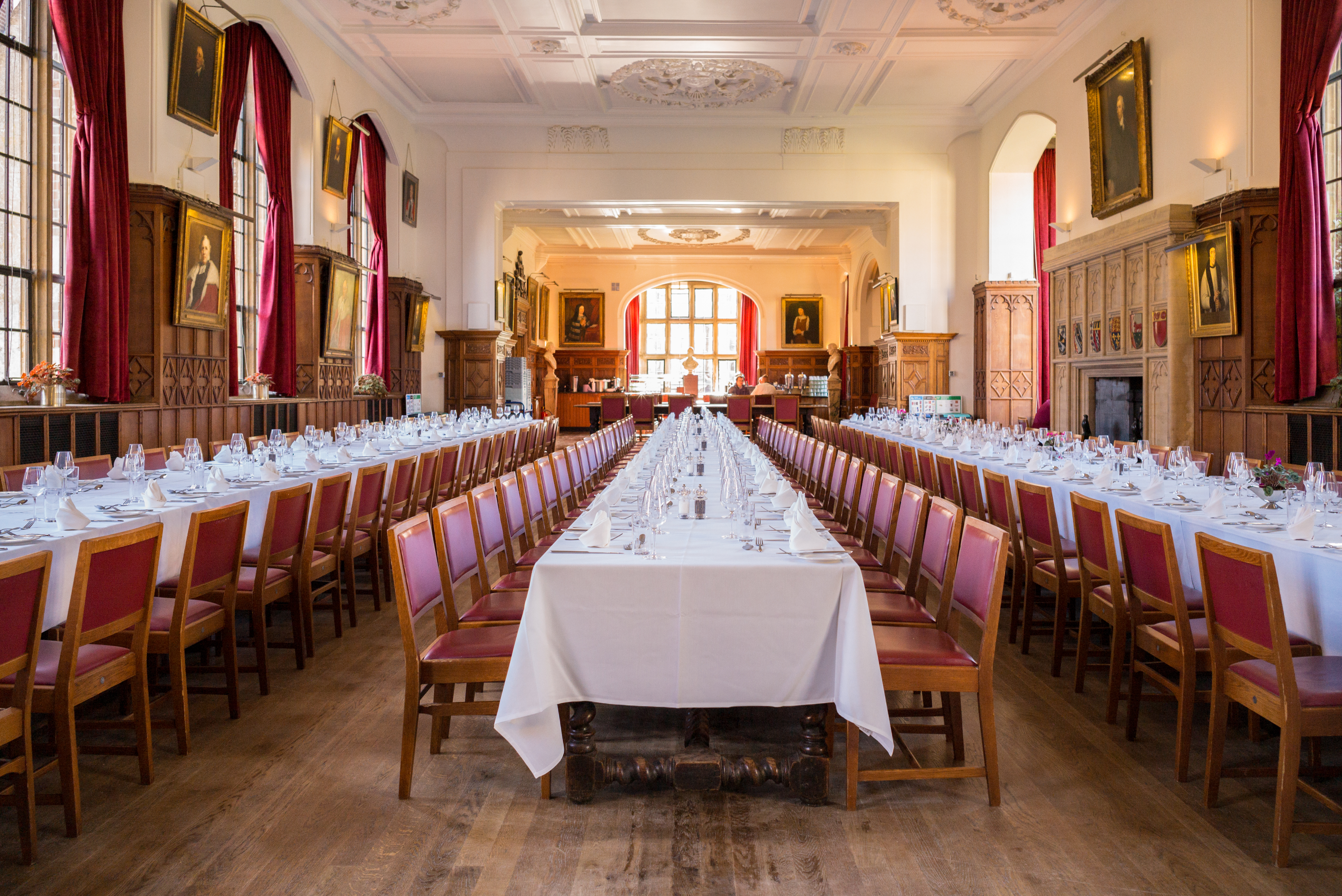
Dining Hall

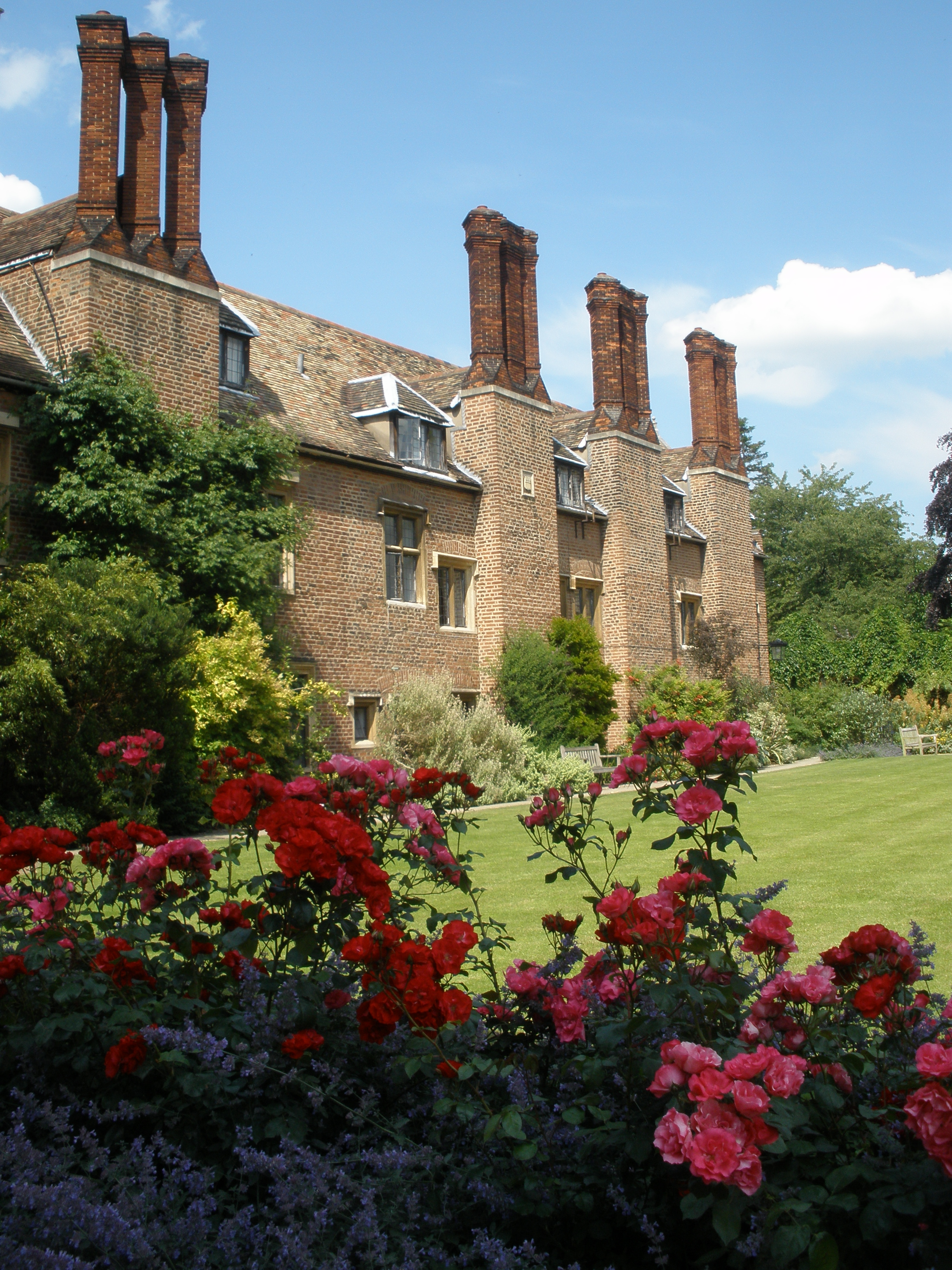
Library Court

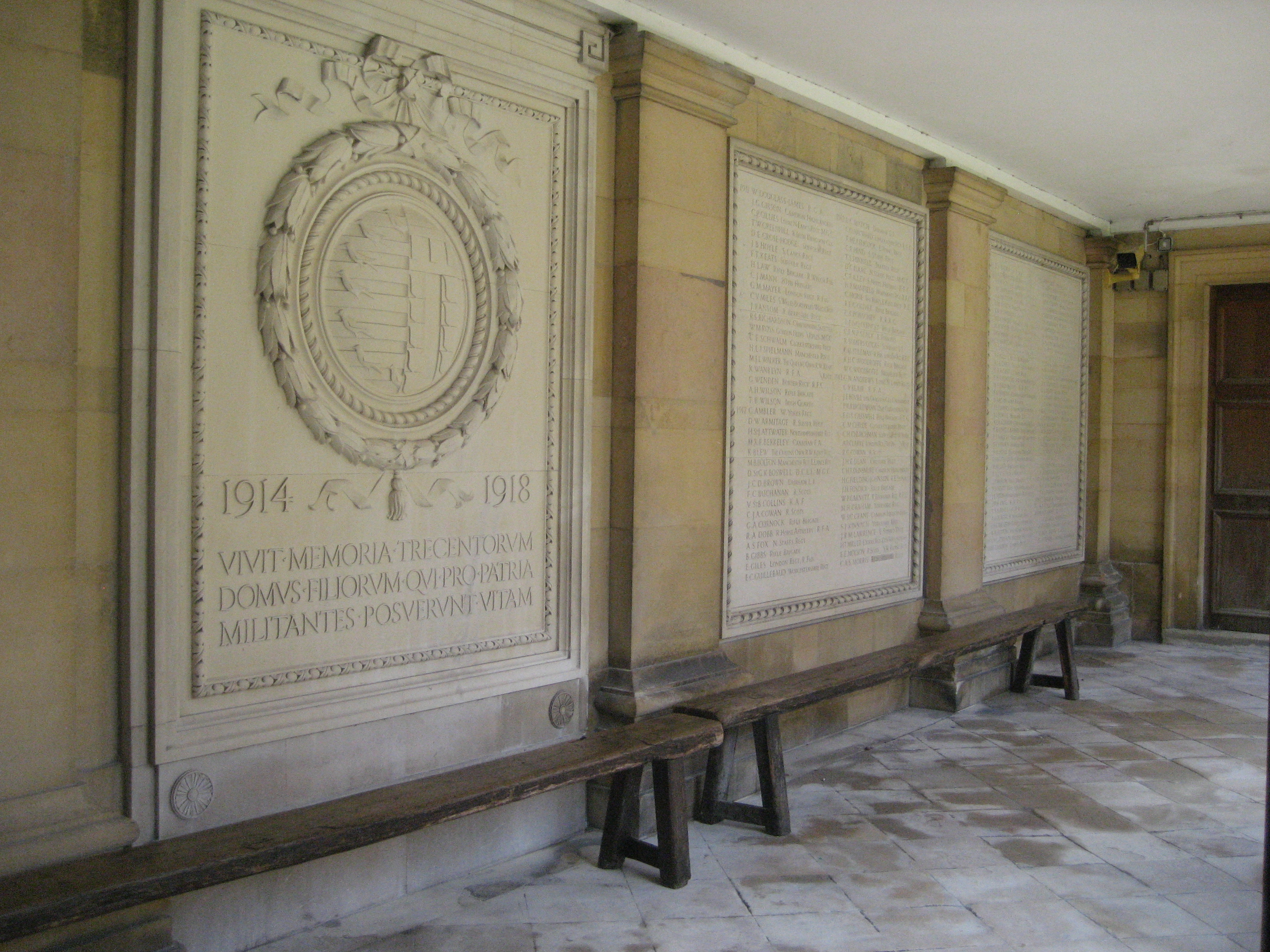
World War I Memorial

== Traditions ==
Pembroke holds Formal Hall four evenings a week depending on the students' qualifications: a separate Hall is held for BA students. Students of the college must wear gowns and arrive on time for Latin Grace, which starts the dinner. Like many Cambridge colleges, Pembroke also has an annual May Ball.

According to popular legends, Pembroke is inhabited by ghosts occupying the Ivy Court.

=== Coat of arms ===
The arms of Pembroke College were officially recorded in 1684. The formal blazon combines the arms of De Valence (bars), dimidiated with the arms of St Pol (vair). It is described as :

Barry of ten argent and azure, an orle of five martlets gules dimidiated with paly vair and gules, on a chief Or a label of five points throughout azure.

== Student life ==
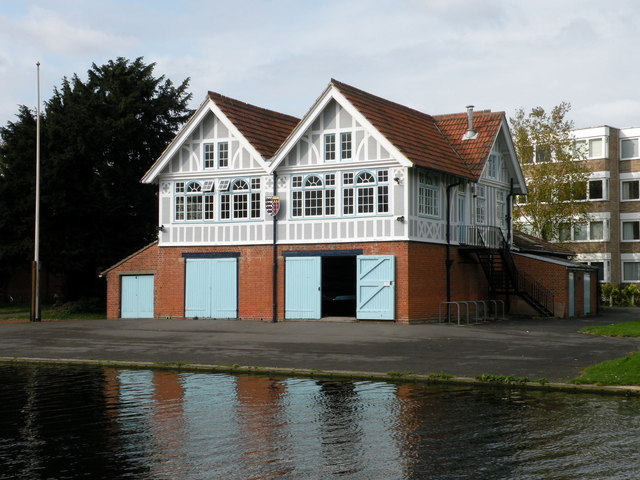
Pembroke's boathouse on the River Cam

Pembroke College has both graduate and undergraduate students, termed Valencians, after the college's original name, and its recreational rooms named as "parlours" rather than the more standard "combination room". The undergraduate student body is represented by the Junior Parlour Committee (JPC). The graduate community is represented by the Graduate Parlour Committee (GPC). In March 2016, the Junior Parlour Committee was featured in national newspapers after it cancelled the theme of an "Around The World in 80 Days" dance party.

There are many sports and societies organised by members of the college. Amongst the most established are Pembroke College Boat Club and the Pembroke Players, the college's dramatic society which has been made famous by alumni including Peter Cook, Eric Idle, Tim Brooke-Taylor, Clive James and Bill Oddie, and is now in its 67th year. Pembroke College Association Football Club (PCAFC) and Women's Association Football Club (PCWAFC) compete separately in collegiate competitions. Chrembroke Hockey Club (PCHC) compete jointly with Christ's College, and Pirton RUFC, the rugby union team, are merged with Girton College.

Female undergraduates were first admitted to the college in 1984.

== International Programmes ==
Pembroke is the only Cambridge College to have an International Programmes Department, providing opportunities for nearly fifty years for international students to spend a semester or the summer in Cambridge.

The Semester Programmes run from September to December as the Fall Semester Programme and from January to June as the Spring Semester Programme, with around forty students on each programme. In addition, a small number of students stay for the whole academic year on both programmes, known as the Combined Semester Programme. The Semester Programmes are highly competitive programmes for academically outstanding students who wish to follow a regular Cambridge degree course as fully matriculated members of the university.

In the summer the college offers the six-week Pembroke Cambridge Summer Programme. Around 250 students from around the world attend the programme and take three courses from a broad range of disciplines. The programme offers students the chance to take courses from outside their major as well as experience the Cambridge model of teaching through the additional Independent Supervision Research Project option. Students attend Formal Halls, where three-course candlelit meals are served in Pembroke’s historic dining hall. Students also attend a series of plenary lectures lead by "eminent figures of University and public life, on a diverse range of topics”. Social activities such as punting and museum visits are organised in and around Cambridge by Programme Assistants, who are current Cambridge undergraduates.

Students can also study and conduct research at Pembroke remotely on the Online Summer Research Programme and Online Capstone Programme. The International Programmes Department also runs programmes for Japanese partners as well as language and internship opportunities in Japan for Pembroke undergraduates.

== People associated with Pembroke ==
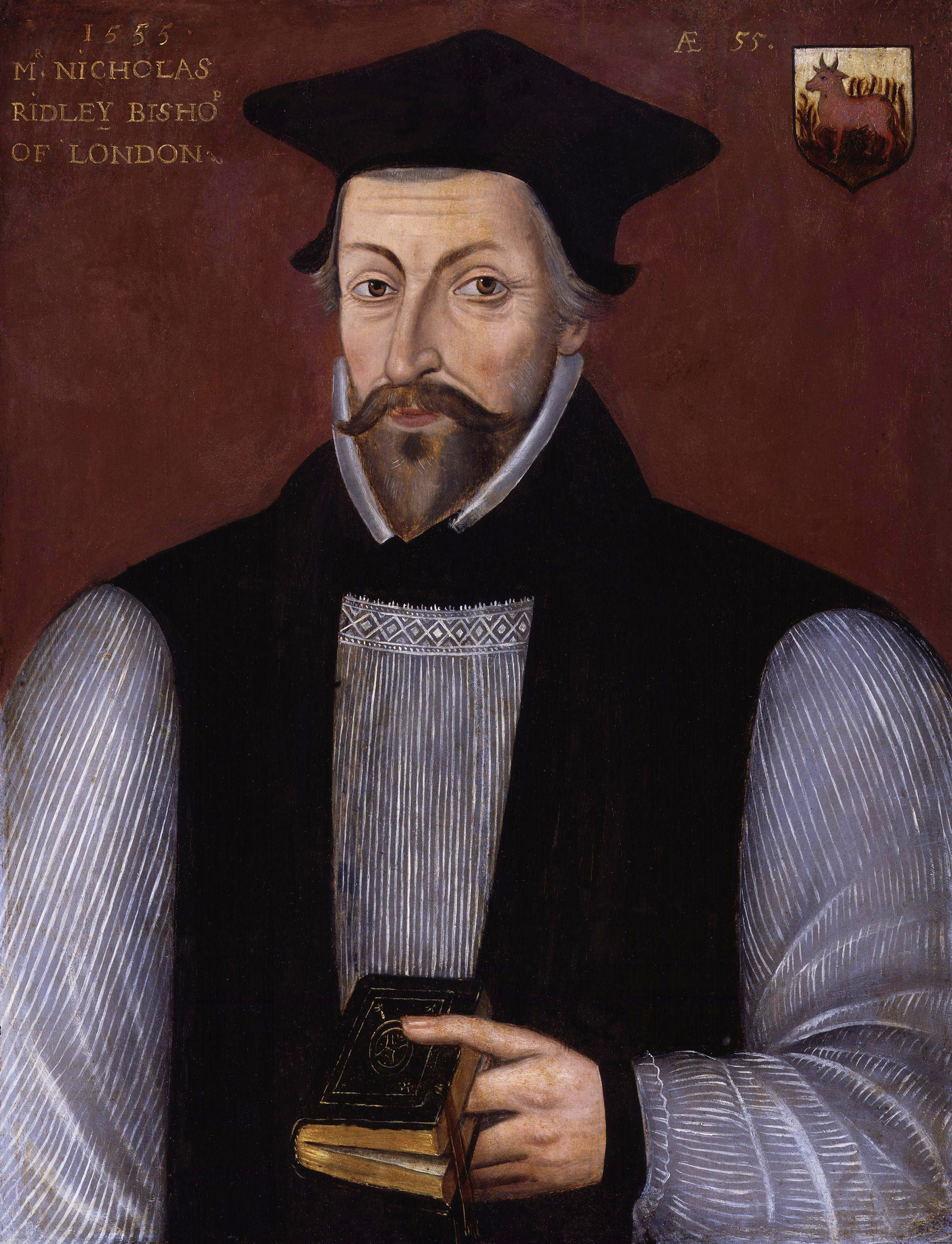
Nicholas Ridley, English Protestant cleric and martyr

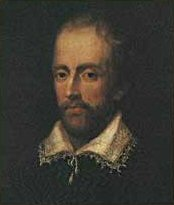
Edmund Spenser, the Elizabethan poet remembered for his epic poem The Faerie Queene

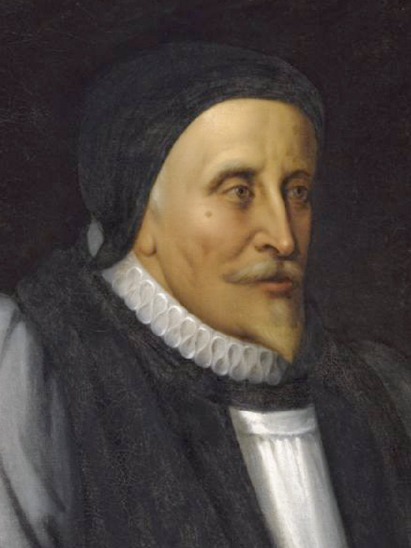
Lancelot Andrewes, English bishop and translator

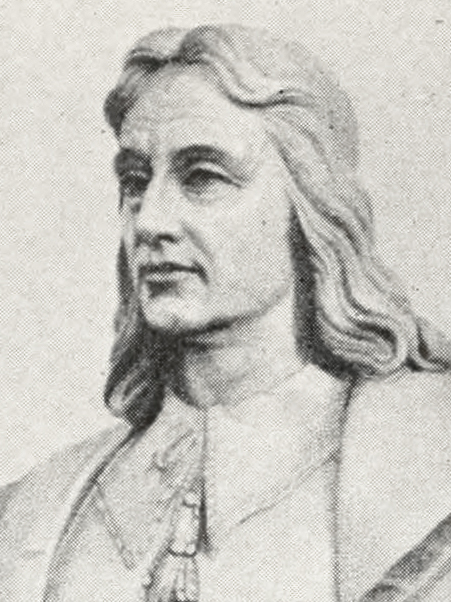
Roger Williams, Baptist theologian, founder of Rhode Island

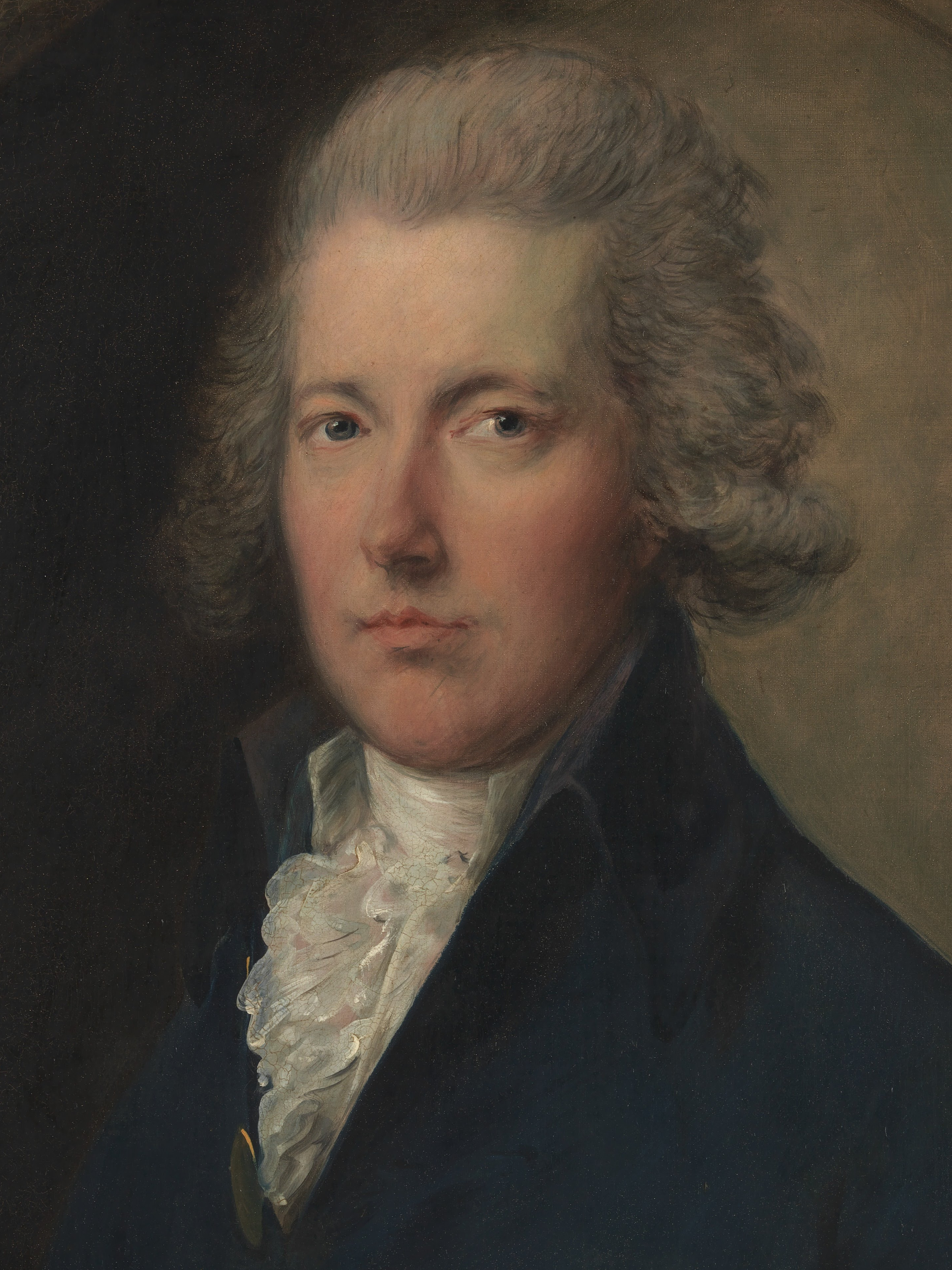
William Pitt the Younger, the youngest ever British Prime Minister (aged 24)

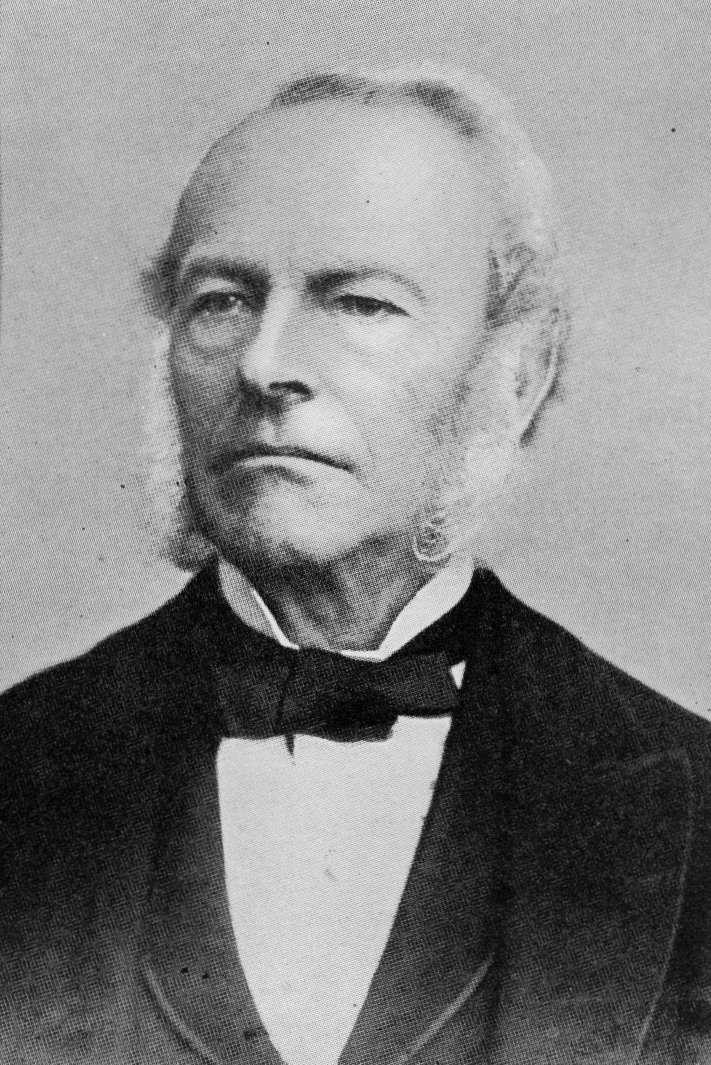
Sir George Gabriel Stokes, Lucasian Professor, a mathematician and physicist

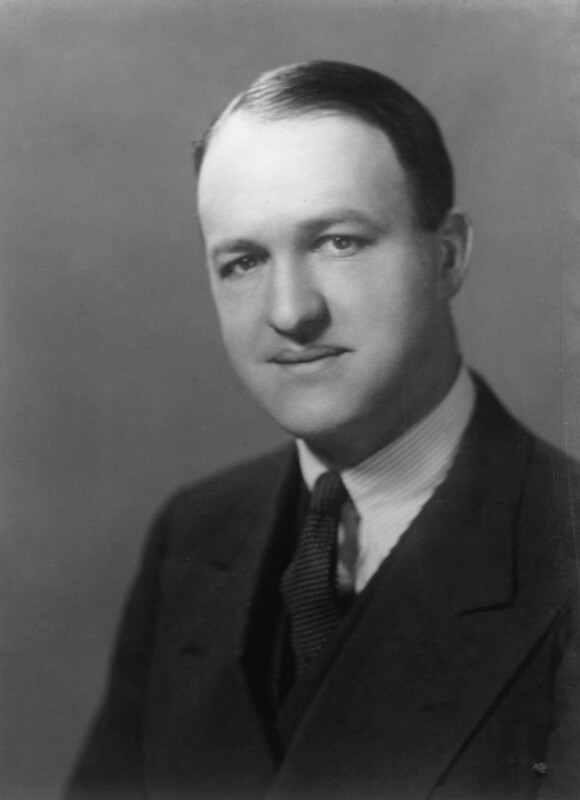
Rab Butler, British Politician

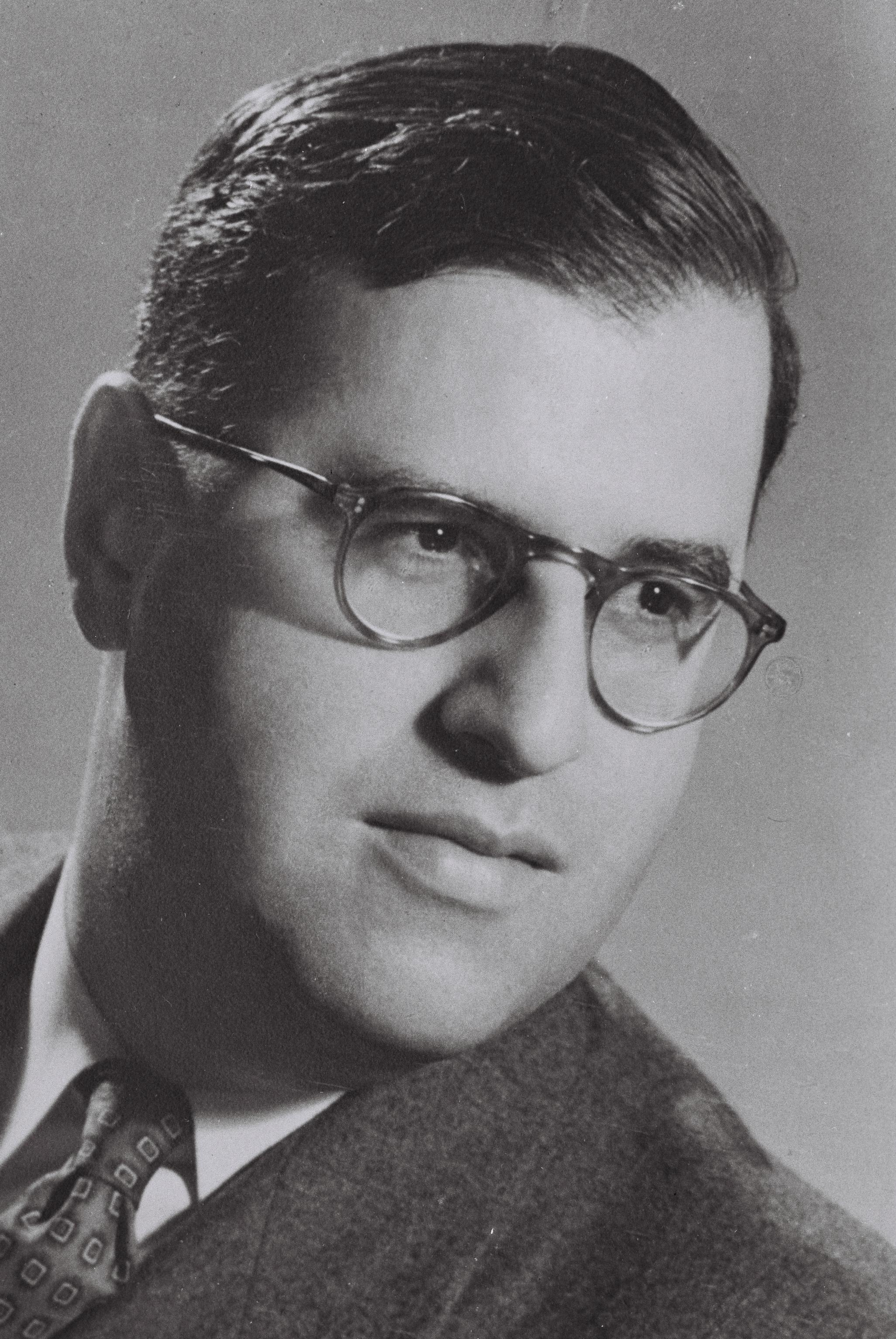
Abba Eban, Israeli Foreign Minister and VP of the United Nations General Assembly

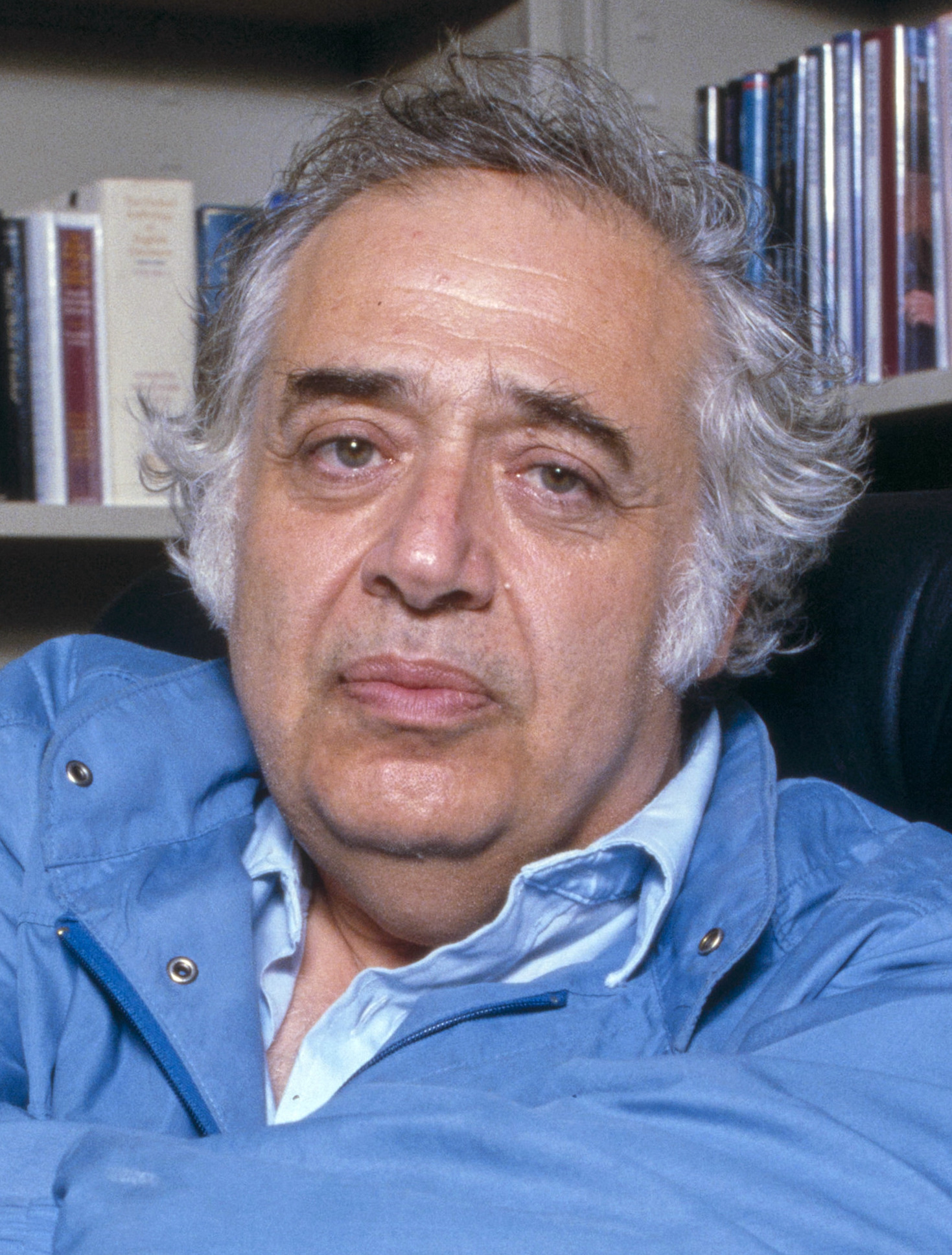
Harold Bloom, literary critic

Peter Cook, British comedian

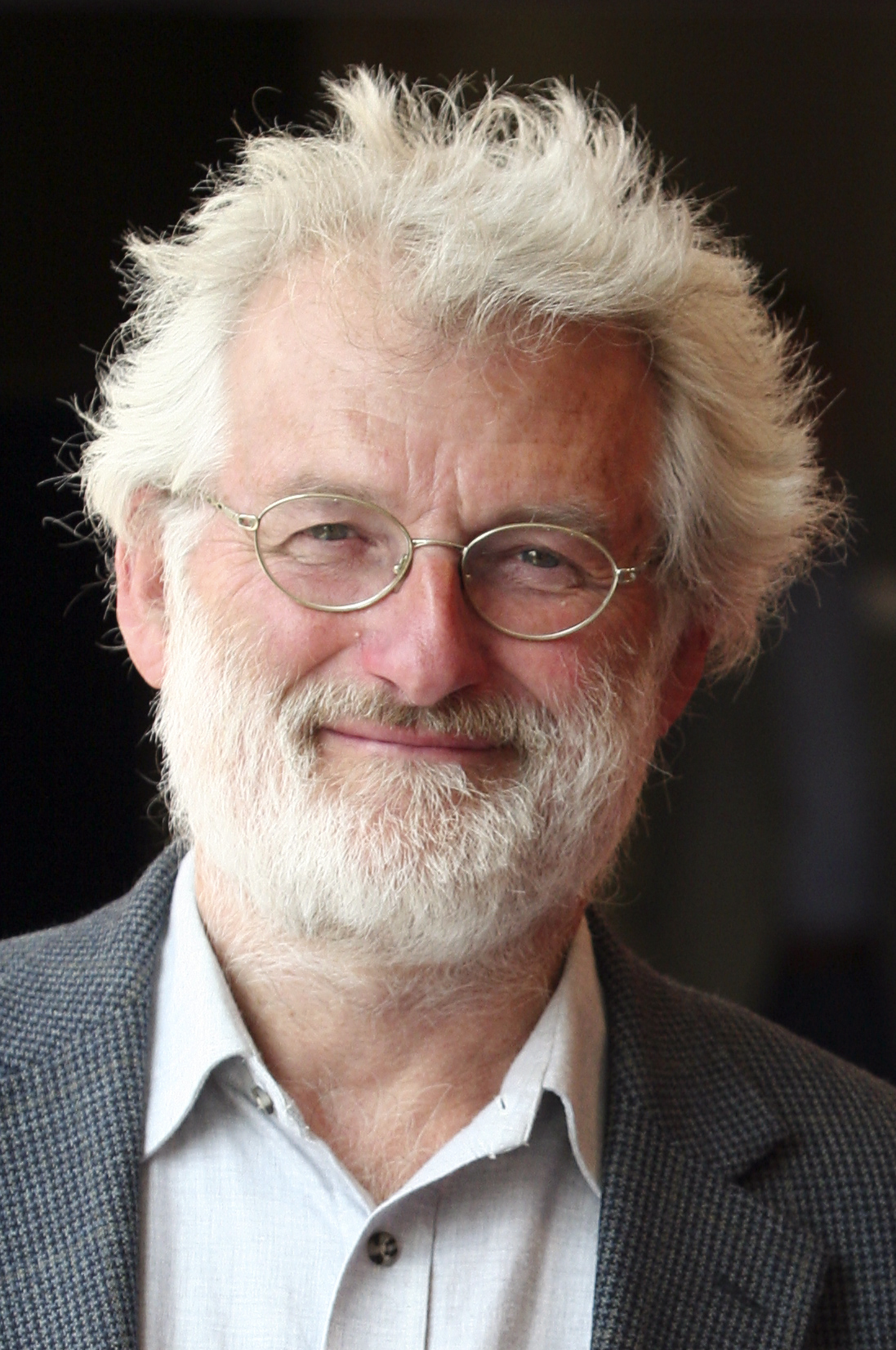
John Sulston, British biologist and Nobel Prize Winner

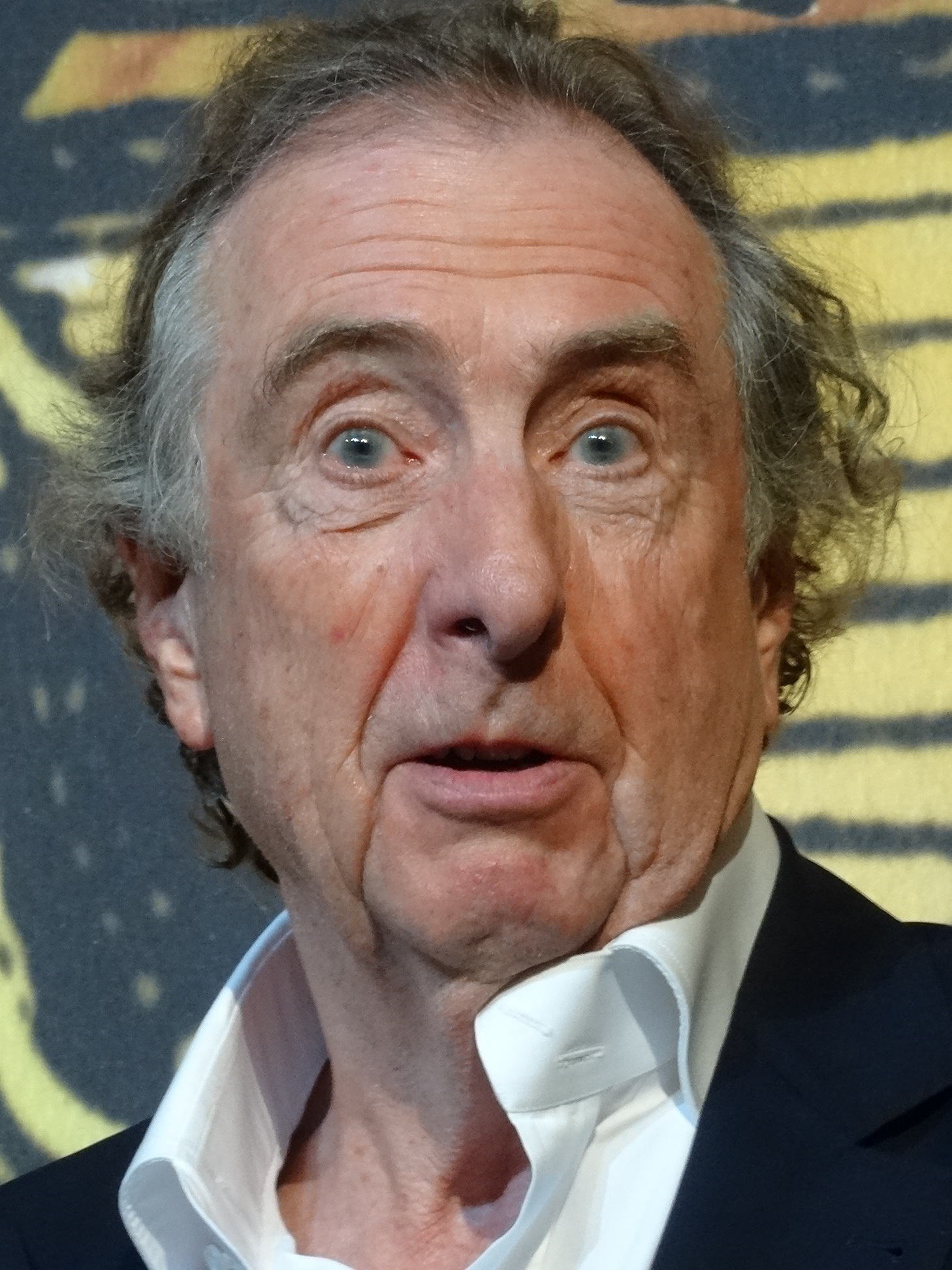
Eric Idle, British comedian and writer, Monty Python member

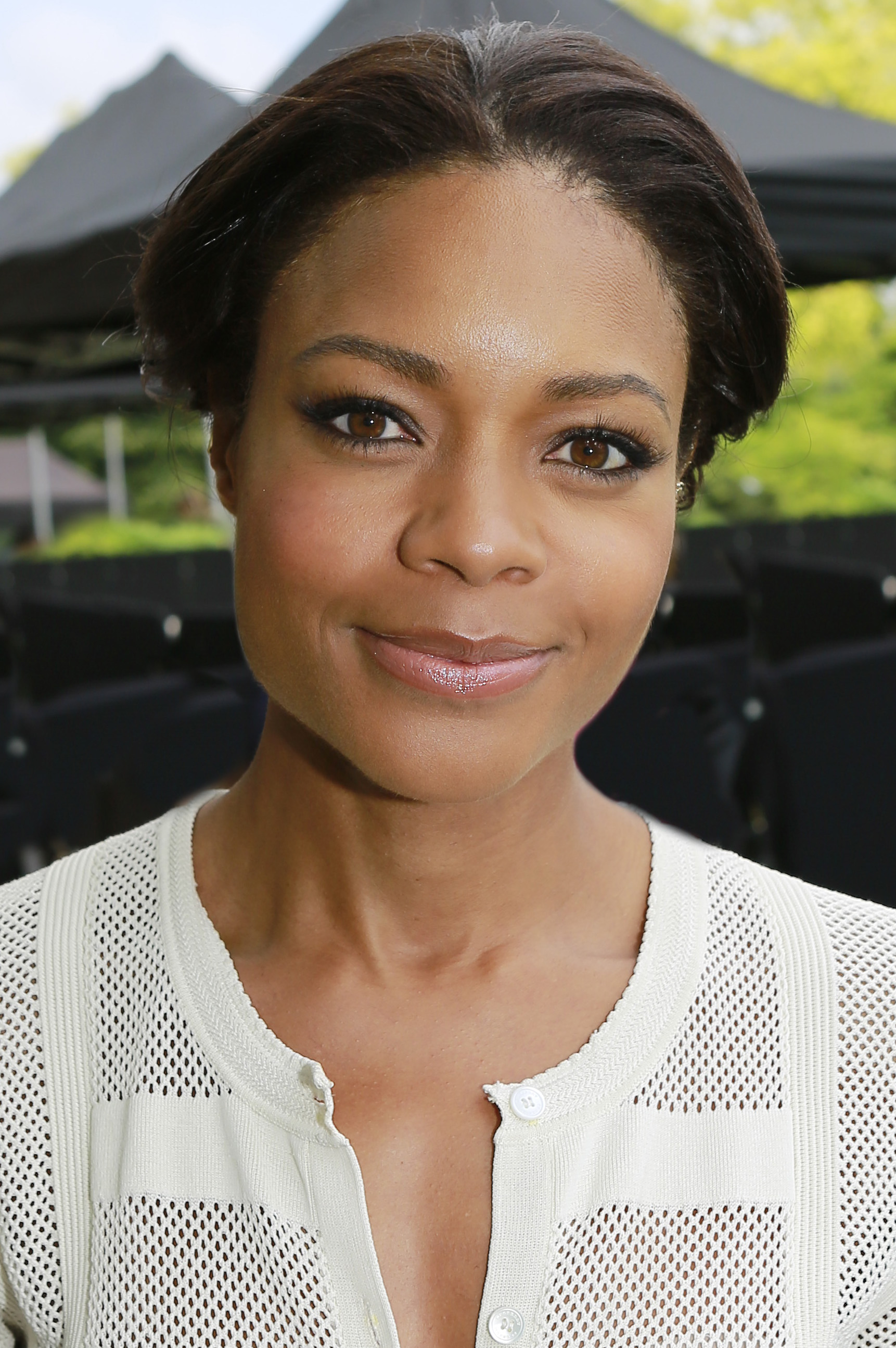
Naomie Harris, British actress

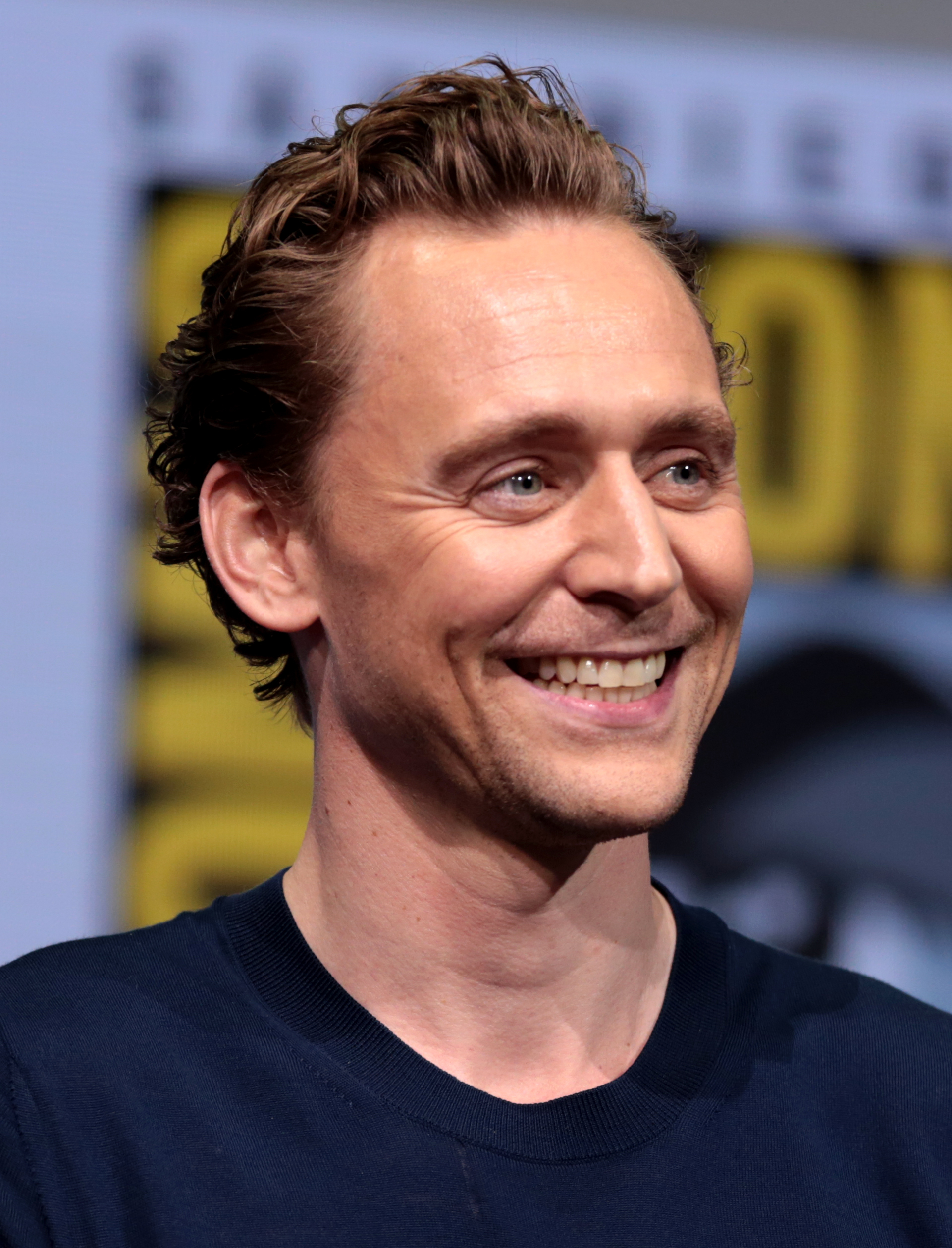
Tom Hiddleston, British actor

== Institutions named after the college ==
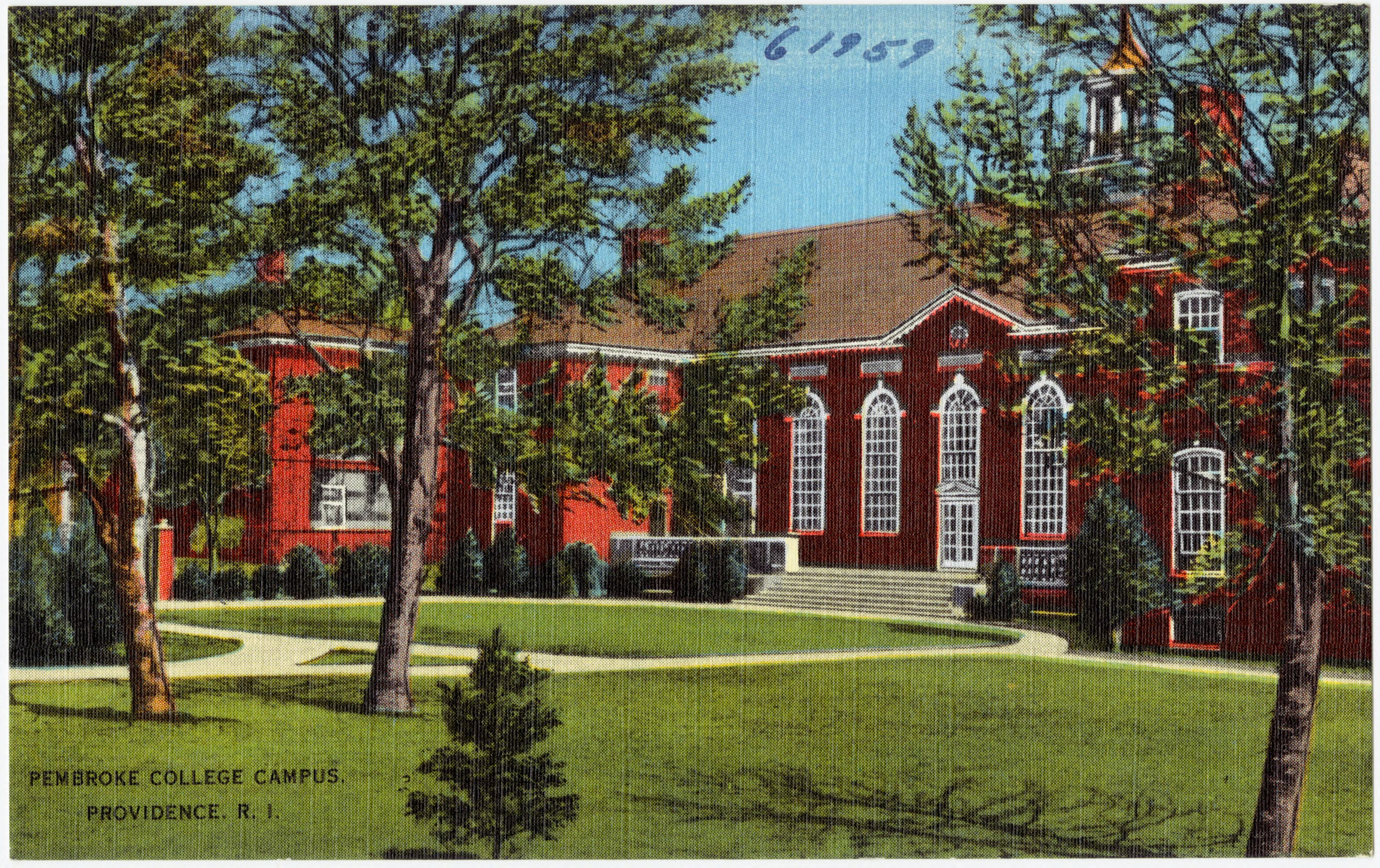
Pembroke College in Brown University, located in Providence, Rhode Island

Pembroke College in Brown University, the former women's college at Brown University in the United States, was named for the principal building on the women's campus, Pembroke Hall, which was itself named in honour of the Pembroke College (Cambridge) alumnus Roger Williams, a co-founder of Rhode Island.

In 1865, Pembroke College donated land for the formation of the Suffolk memorial to Prince Albert. The land at Framlingham in the county of Suffolk was used to build a school, The Albert Memorial College. The school today is known as Framlingham College and one of its seven houses is named Pembroke House in recognition of the contribution Pembroke College has made to the school.

In 1981, a decade after the merger of Pembroke College into Brown University, the Pembroke Center for Teaching and Research on Women there was named in honour of Pembroke College and the history of women's efforts to gain access to higher education.

== See also ==
- List of organ scholars
