= Annette Pearse =

New Zealand art gallery curator and director

Annette Grace Pearse (née Weeks, 22 May 1893 – 24 February 1981) was a New Zealand art gallery curator and director.

== Early life ==
Pearse was born in Bowling, Dunbartonshire, Scotland in 1893. Her parents were George Weeks and Elizabeth (née Stephenson). She was educated at the Glasgow School of Art and London Central School of Art and Design.

== Career ==
Pearse was appointed Curator of the Dunedin Public Art Gallery (DPAG) in 1946, a position she held until retiring in 1964. She was the first woman to hold such a position in New Zealand.

During her tenure, Pearse made a number of trips to Britain to acquire artworks for the gallery. Most notably, she began a long friendship with secured the donation of Archdeacon Francis Smythe, which led to a major bequest of some 1,300 watercolours by a wide range of British artists, painted between the seventeenth and twentieth centuries, to the DPAG and to the New Zealand National Art Gallery. She also formed relationships with other collectors such as Doris Monheimer, Dorothy Theomin and Eleanor Joachim, all of whom made bequests of art to the gallery on their deaths. One of her most outstanding acquisitions was Thomas Gainsborough and John Hoppner’s full-length portrait of Charlotte, Countess Talbot, purchased in 1958.

Much of Pearse's success in acquisitions was due to her personal relationship with Sir Alec Martin, chair of the auction house Christie's from 1940 to 1958. She also developed an association with the National Art Collection Fund, an organisation dedicated to assisting art galleries in locating and acquiring art for display.

In addition to expanding the collection, Pearse was responsible for improving the range of objects displayed in the gallery, and the quality of their presentation. The gallery's building was expanded and developed and the exhibition programme was improved.

The main criticism of Pearse's curation of the gallery was that she largely ignored contemporary New Zealand art. In 1963, the gallery society commissioned a report on the collection – Esmond de Beer concluded that the collection was deficient in this regard and recommended a focus on acquiring local art.

Pearse retired to Alexandra, Central Otago, in 1964 and lived there til her death in 1981. On her retirement, the National Art Collection Fund presented her with a gift of an eighteenth-century French bust, in recognition of her services to art. The bust is in the collection of the Dunedin Public Art Gallery.

== Personal life ==
In 1917, Pearse married Leonard George Pearse in Portsmouth, England. They had one daughter the following year, then in 1923 emigrated to New Zealand and farmed in Central Otago. Leonard Pearse died in Auckland in 1942. The Pearses' daughter, Fiona, published memoirs in 2010, which included stories about her parents' lives and careers.
