= John King (bishop of London) =

Bishop in the Church of England (died 1621)

The Right Reverend and Right Honourable John King
- Bishop of London
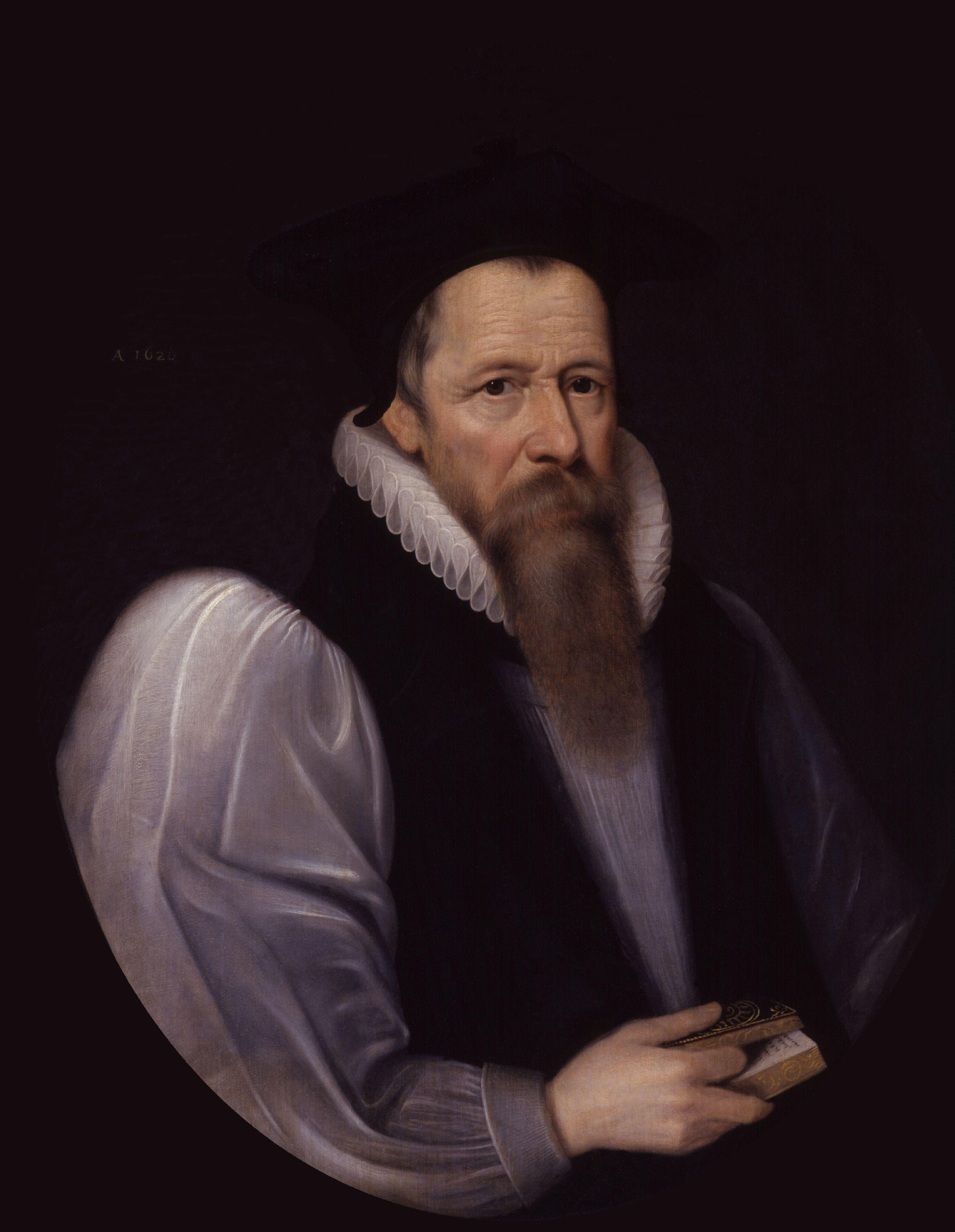
- Church: Church of England
- See: London
- In office: 1611–1621
- Predecessor: George Abbot
- Successor: George Monteigne

Personal details
- Died: 1621

John King (c. 1559 – 30 March 1621) was the Bishop of London in the Church of England from 1611 to 1621.

== Life ==
King was born in Worminghall, Buckinghamshire, to Philip King and Elizabeth (née Conquest). After an early education at Westminster School, he matriculated at Christ Church, Oxford, in 1577, taught under Dr Thomas Holland, graduating B.A. in 1580 and M.A. in 1583. A chaplain to bishop John Piers, King became preacher to the city of York before becoming domestic chaplain to Thomas Egerton in London. As Rector of St Andrews, Holborn in 1597 and prebend of Sneating in St Paul's in 1599, King became a well-known Calvinist anti-Catholic preacher. Appointed a chaplain in ordinary to James I, James then made John King dean of Christ Church in August 1605. He was Vice-Chancellor of Oxford University from 1607 until 1610. He was consecrated Bishop of London on 8 September 1611.

In 1617, according to Samuel Purchas, while Pocahontas was in London King entertained her "with festival state and pomp beyond what I have seen in his greate hospitalitie afforded to other ladies".

King died on 30 March 1621 (Good Friday), seemingly of gall stones or kidney stones. Roman Catholic propagandists' claims that he converted to their church on his deathbed were denied in a sermon preached by his son, Henry King, the following November.

== Family ==
King married Joan Freeman, and had five sons and four daughters:

- Henry King (1592–1669), poet, Bishop of Chichester
- John King (1595–1638/9), canon of Westminster and Windsor
- Robert King (c. 1598–1654), soldier and voyager to the Americas
- William King (c. 1601–1635/6?), Rector of St Botolph Billingsgate, 1629–1635/6
- Philip King (1603–1666/7), Archdeacon of Lewes
- Elizabeth King (c. 1605 – after 1670), married (1) Edward Holte, son of Sir Thomas Holte Bt, (2) John Millington
- Mary King (died before 1653), married Mr. Gill
- Dorothy King (died 1658), married Sir Richard Hubert of Langley
- Anne King (1621 – after 1671), poet, married (1) John Dutton MP, (2) Sir Richard Howe Bt MP

== Memorials ==
There was a memorial brass to him at Old St Paul's Cathedral.

King Street, Hammersmith's main street, is named after him.

== See also ==
- List of bishops of London

Church of England titles
| Preceded by George Abbot | Bishop of London; 1611–1621 | Succeeded by George Monteigne |
