= Richard White of Basingstoke =

English jurist (1539–1611)

Richard White (1539–1611) was an English jurist and historian, in later life an expatriate scholar who became a Catholic priest.

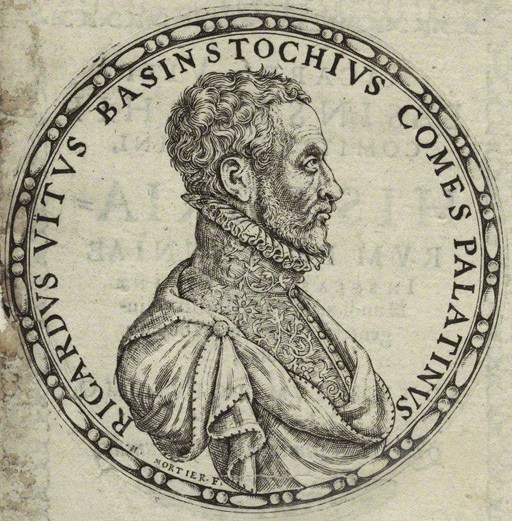
Richard White of Basingstoke.

== Life ==
He was son of Henry White of Basingstoke, Hampshire, who died at the siege of Boulogne in 1544. His mother was Agnes, daughter of Richard Capelin of Hampshire. He was born at Basingstoke, entered Winchester School in 1553, and was admitted perpetual fellow of New College, Oxford, in 1557. He took the degree of B.A. on 30 May 1559. On the advice of John Boxall he travelled abroad to study law; his fellowship was declared void in 1564.

White went to Louvain and then to the University of Padua, where he was created doctor of the civil and canon laws. He was admitted to Doctors' Commons in 1568; but emigrated in 1570. At Douay he was constituted royal professor of law. He resided for twenty years at Douay, where he married twice and acquired wealth by each wife. By order of the pope he was made, though out of his ordinary turn, magnificus rector of the university, and about the same time he was created comes palatinus.

After the death of his second wife White was, by dispensation of Pope Clement VIII, ordained priest, and about the same time a canonry in the church of St. Peter at Douay was bestowed upon him. He died at Douay in 1611, and was buried in the church of St. Jacques there.

== Works ==
In his study of British history White received encouragement from Thomas Goldwell, Sir Henry Peacham, and Sir Francis Englefield; and particularly from Cardinal Baronius, with whom he maintained a correspondence. His works are:

- Ælia Lælia Crispis. Epitaphium antiquum quod in agro Bononiensi adhuc uidetur; a diuersis hactenus interpretatum uarie: nouissime autem a Ricardo Vito Basinstochio, amicorum precibus explicatum, Padua, 1568. Dedicated to Christopher Johnson, chief master of Winchester school; reprinted, Dort, 1618. Its subject is the enigmatic inscription, then recent, dedicated to "Ælia Lælia Crispis".
- Orationes: (1) De circulo artium et philosophiæ. (2) De eloquentia et Cicerone. (3) Pro divitiis regum. (4) Pro doctoratu. (5) De studiorum finibus. Cum notis rerum variarum et antiquitatis, Arras, 1596. The first two, delivered at Louvain, were published by Christopher Johnson, 1564, 1565, and ordered by him to be read publicly in Winchester school.
- R. Viti … Notæ ad leges Decem-virorum in duodecim tabulis; institutiones juris civilis in quattuor libris: primam partem Digestorum in quattuor libris, 2 parts, Arras, 1597.
- Historiarum (Britanniæ) libri (1–11) … cum notis antiquitatum Britannicarum [edited by Thomas White], 7 parts, Arras and Douay, 1597–1607,. The author's portrait is prefixed to this work. He supported his account of the legendary British history with references to the works of Annius of Viterbo, which were forged.
- Oratio septima de religione legum Romanorum, ad reverendum Dominum, Dominum Nicolaum Manifroy, electum Abbatem Bertinianum, Douay, 1604.
- Brevis explicatio privilegiorum iuris et consuetudinis circa venerabile sacramentum Eucharistiæ, Douay, 1609.
- De Reliquiis et Veneratione Sanctorum, Douay, 1609.
- Brevis explicatio Martyrii Sanctæ Ursulæ et undecim millium Virginum Britannarum, Douay, 1610.
