= Hugh Glaisyer =

Hugh Glaisyer (born 20 January 1930) was the Archdeacon of Lewes & Hastings from 1991 to 1997.

Glaisyer was educated at Tonbridge School; Oriel College, Oxford; and St Stephen's House, Oxford. After National Service in the RAF he was ordained in 1956. After curacies in Bolton and Sidcup he held incumbencies in Gravesend and Hove. He was also a Canon of Chichester Cathedral from 1982 to 1991.

Church of England titles
Preceded by Christopher Luxmoore	Archdeacon of Lewes & Hastings; 1991–1997	Succeeded by Nicholas Reade
