= Richard Bowchier =

Richard Bowchier (28 January 1661 – 3 November 1723) was the Archdeacon of Lewes from 1693 until 1723. He was also known as an antiquarian.

Bouchier was born in Pilton, Devon. He was a Fellow of St John's College, Cambridge. He was incorporated at Oxford in 1683. He was a Prebend and Canon of Chichester Cathedral and Vicar of Amport.

Church of England titles
Preceded by Joseph Sayer	Archdeacon of Lewes; 1693–1723	Succeeded by James Williamson
