= Jordan de Melburne =

Archdeacon of Lewes

Jordan de Melburne is the first recorded Archdeacon of Lewes.
