= Richard Buckenham =

Richard Buckenham (c. 1567 – 1628) was a seventeenth-century clergyman and book collector.

Richard was the second son of William Buckenham, a wealthy mercer who was active politically in Ipswich Corporation, matriculating at Pembroke College, Cambridge in 1584, and becoming a fellow in 1588. His family had been neighbours of William Smarte, who was also active in the corporation. In 1599 before William Smarte's death, Buckenham ensured that over 100 manuscripts in Smarte's possession were donated to Pembroke College library.

He was rector of St George's Church, Great Bromley, 1600–1612.

He was the Archdeacon of Lewes from 1612 until 1628.

Church of England titles
Preceded by John Mattock	Archdeacon of Lewes; 1612–1628	Succeeded by William Hutchinson
