= Lloyd Morrell =

English bishop of Lewes (1907–1996)

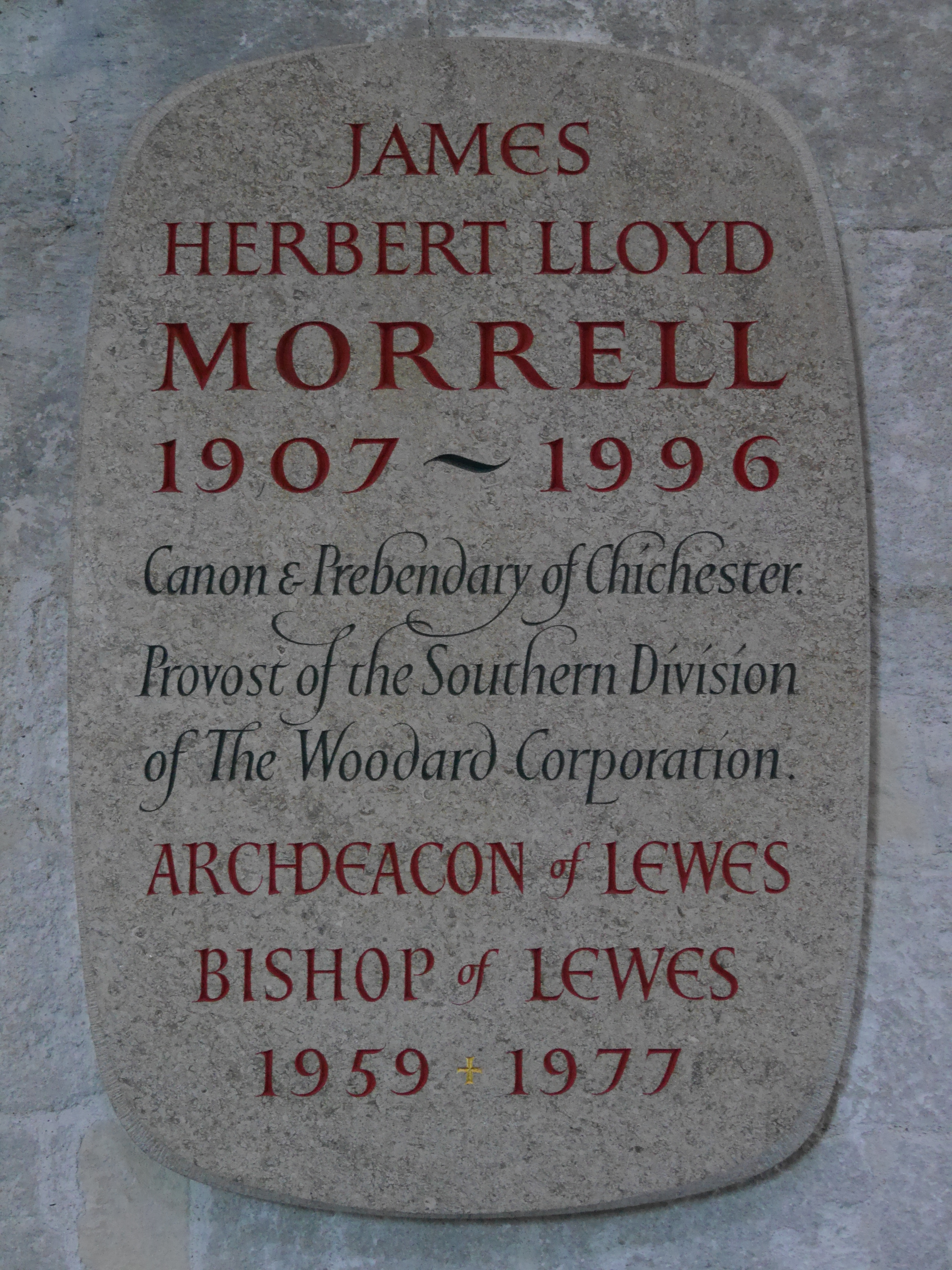
Memorial, Chichester Cathedral

James Herbert Lloyd Morrell (called Lloyd; 12 August 1907 – 28 March 1996) was the seventh Bishop of Lewes.

== Biography ==
Morrell was educated at Dulwich College and King's College London. He was deaconed on Trinity Sunday 1931 (31 May) and priested the following Trinity Sunday (22 May 1932) — both times by Arthur Winnington-Ingram, Bishop of London, at St Paul's Cathedral. He began his career with curacies at St Alphage, Hendon and St Michael & All Angels, Brighton after which he was chaplain to George Bell, Bishop of Chichester and then a Lecturer for The Church of England Moral Welfare Council. From here he went to be Vicar of Roffey and then Archdeacon of Lewes before appointment to the Episcopate in 1959, serving eventually for eighteen years. He was consecrated a bishop on 30 November 1959, by Geoffrey Fisher, Archbishop of Canterbury, at Westminster Abbey.

Church of England titles
Preceded by Geoffrey Warde	Bishop of Lewes; 1959–1977	Succeeded by Peter Ball
