= John Sherry =

Archdeacon of Lewes from 1542 to 1551

John Sherry (c. 1506 – 1555), was the Anglican Archdeacon of Lewes in East Sussex, England, between 1542 and 1551.

== Life ==
Sherry was born around 1506 in London. He later took up a literary and academic career. In 1522, he became a demy, (Note: Demy - A foundation scholar at Magdalen College, Oxford: so called because such a scholar originally received half the allowance of a fellow.) or a foundation scholar of Magdalen College, Oxford, and graduated as a B.A. on 21 June 1527. He went on to receive an M.A. on 10 March 1531. In 1534, he was appointed headmaster of Magdalen College School, Oxford, and held this post until 1540, when he was succeeded by Goodall. Subsequently, he established himself in London and devoted himself to literary work, completing both some original writings and translations of the works of others.

== Works ==
- ‘A very fruitfull Exposition upon the Syxte Chapter of Saynte John. Written in Latin by John Brencius (Johannes Brenz) and translated by Richard Shirrye,’ London, 1550, 8vo.
- ‘A Treatise of Schemes and Tropes gathered out of the best Grammarians and Oratours. Whereunto is added a declamation written fyrst in Latin by Erasmus,’ London, n.d. 16mo; 1550, 8vo.
- ‘St Basil the Great his letter to Gregory Nazianzen translated by Richard Sherrie,’ London, n.d. 8vo.
- ‘A Treatise of the Figures of Grammer [sic] and Rhetorike,’ London, 1555, 8vo.

== Sources ==
- This article incorporates text from a publication now in the public domain: "Sherry, Richard". Dictionary of National Biography. London: Smith, Elder & Co. 1885–1900.
