= Francis Smythe (priest) =

Francis Henry Dumville Smythe (1873–1966) was the Archdeacon of Lewes from 1929 to 1946.

Smythe was educated at Haileybury and Imperial Service College and Emmanuel College, Cambridge. He was ordained in 1898 and held curacies at South Petherton, Bunbury and Alfrick. He held incumbencies in Horsted Keynes, Hove and Eastbourne; and died on 8 October 1966.

Smythe was a prolific collector of watercolours, and in the 1950s, he donated his collection to the Dunedin Public Art Gallery and New Zealand's National Art Gallery. The decision to make the donation to galleries in a county he never visited came after a long friendship with New Zealand art curator and gallery director Annette Pearse.
