= Christopher Johnson (physician) =

English physician and poet (c.1536–1597)

Christopher Johnson or Jonson (1536?–1597) was an English physician, educator and Neo-Latin poet.

== Life ==
Born about 1536, at Kedleston in Derbyshire, he became a scholar at Winchester College in 1549. He went on to New College, Oxford, and was made perpetual fellow in 1555. He graduated B.A. in 1558, and M.A. in 1561.

In 1560 Johnson was recommended to Archbishop Matthew Parker by Francis Hastings, 2nd Earl of Huntingdon, and appointed to the headmastership of Winchester College. He remained there for ten years.

Johnson, who had always intended to become a physician, practised in Winchester while he was still headmaster. He was granted the degree of Bachelor of Medicine at Oxford, with licence to practise, 14 December 1569, and proceeded M.D. 23 June 1571. In 1570 he resigned his post at Winchester, and moved to London, where he practised within the parish of St. Dunstan-in-the-West. He was admitted a fellow of the London College of Physicians about 1580, and filled several of the college offices: as censor in 1581 and several subsequent years; elect, 28 May 1594; consiliarius, 1594–6; treasurer, 1594–6.

Johnson died in July 1597 in London, leaving a fortune and several children.

== Works ==
Johnson was considered among the best Latin poets of his time. He published Ranarum et murium pugna, Latina versione donata, ex Homero, London, 1580, and wrote three poems in connection with Winchester, Ortus atque vita Gul. Wykehami Winton. Episcopi, dated 14 December 1564, in elegiacs; Custodum sive Præsidum Coll. Winton. series; and Didascalorum Coll. Wint. omnium Elenchus. All these were published at the close of the Poemata (1573) by Richard Willes.

In 1564 Johnson edited and had printed for the use of his scholars two orations delivered at Louvain by Richard White of Basingstoke, De circulo Artium et Philosophiæ, and De Eloquentiâ et Cicerone.’ In 1568 White dedicated to him a short Latin dissertation on an ancient epitaph (Ælia Lælia Crispis. Epitaphium, Padua).

Johnson's only medical work was a Counsel against the Plague, or any other Infectious Disease, with a Question, Whether a man for preservation may be purged in the Dog-days or No?, London, 1577.

== Sources ==
- Lee, Sidney, ed. (1892). "Johnson, Christopher" . Dictionary of National Biography. Vol. 30. London: Smith, Elder & Co.

Attribution

This article incorporates text from a publication now in the public domain: Lee, Sidney, ed. (1892). "Johnson, Christopher". Dictionary of National Biography. Vol. 30. London: Smith, Elder & Co.
