= Guy Mayfield =

The Ven. Guy Mayfield (23 June 1905 – 19 July 1976) was a Church of England priest who served notably as Archdeacon of Hastings from 1956 to 1975.

He was educated at Lancing College and Magdalene College, Cambridge. Ordained 1930, Curate St John's Fitzroy Square, St. Saviour's, Walton Street, SW; Hurstpierpoint, Asst Editor The Guardian, 1936–39; Chaplain, RAFVR, 1939, Duxford, Gibraltar, Egypt and The Sudan, 1943. Rector: St Paul's, St Leonards-on-Sea, 1946; Little Horsted, 1948; Dir of Religious Education, Chichester Diocese, 1948; Dep. Diocesan Sec., Press Sec., 1950; Prebendary in Chichester Cathedral, 1956, Select Preacher, Cambridge Univ.

Mayfield was stationed at RAF Duxford during the Battle of Britain. His previously unpublished war diary for the time was published by the Imperial War Museum in April 2018.

He was Chairman of the College Council of Ardingly College from 1964 to 1972.

== Published works ==
- An Anglican Guide to the Orthodox Liturgy. London: Fellowship of St. Alban and St. Sergius. 1949. OCLC 2679963. OL 21721570M.
- The Church of England: its members and its business. London: Oxford University Press. 1958. OCLC 752748288. OL 6241833M.
- Praying with Simplicity. London: Darton, Longman and Todd. 1964. OCLC 782994812. OL 19434779M.
- Like Nothing on Earth. London: Darton, Longman and Todd. 1965. OCLC 949043303. OL 18882353M.
- Life and Death in the Battle of Britain. London: Imperial War Museum. April 2018. ISBN 9781904897316. OCLC 991786414.
