= Thomas Birch (priest) =

Archdeacon of Lewes

Thomas Birch DCL (1766 – 25 February 1840) was the Archdeacon of Lewes from 1823 until 1840. Birch was born in 1766, son of Rev. Thomas Birch, who was Rector of Thoresby in Lincolnshire. He was educated at Merchant Taylors' School, Northwood until 1785 when he was elected a fellow at St John's College, Oxford. He was also Dean of Battle (appointed 1801), Vicar of Westfield, Sussex (appointed in 1828), Vicar of Bexhill, Sussex (appointed in March 1836), and chaplain to the House of Correction in Battle, East Sussex (appointed in 1834). Birch was highly respected and in his office as Dean of Battle in 1820 he performed the baptism of the second son of Sir Godfrey Webster, 5th Baronet in the presence of the child's godfather, Prince Augustus Frederick, Duke of Sussex.

Birch was described in The Gentleman's Magazine as "amiable, learned, and pious".

He married Maria Rosara Gordon, daughter of Charles Gordon, on 30 January 1804. Maria was the sister of James Alexander Gordon and niece of Sylvester Douglas, 1st Baron Glenbervie. They had four sons and five daughters. Their first son, Thomas Frederick Birch (born 16 January 1805) was in the Royal Navy, was commander of HMS Wizard (1830) in 1837, and retired a Rear-Admiral.

He was buried at Bexhill, but after his death, the inhabitants of Battle erected a tablet to his memory in the nave of Battle Church. Additional tablets in the church are dedicated to five of his daughters and to his mother.

Church of England titles
Preceded by Edward Robert Raynes	Archdeacon of Lewes; 1823–1840	Succeeded by Julius Hare
