= Max Godden =

British Anglican archdeacon

The Ven Max Leon Godden, MA (25 November 1923 – 1 March 2000) was Archdeacon of Lewes from 1972 until 1975; and of Lewes and Hastings from then until 1988.

He was born on 25 November 1923 and educated at The Judd School and Worcester College, Oxford. After World War II service with the RAFVR he was ordained in 1953 and began his career with curacies in Cuckfield and Brighton. He was Vicar of Hangleton from 1957 to 1962 and then of Glynde until 1982.

He died on 1 March 2000.
