= John King (canon of Westminster) =

English priest (??–1638)

John King DD (d. 2 January 1638) was a Canon of Windsor from 1625 to 1638 and a Canon of Westminster from 1613 to 1638.

== Family ==
He was the second son of John King (Bishop of London).

== Career ==
He was educated at Christ Church, Oxford graduating BA in 1611 and MA in 1614 and DD in 1625.

He was appointed:

- Prebendary of Kentish Town in St Paul's Cathedral 1616 - 1639
- Public Orator of Oxford 1624
- Prebendary of Christ Church, Oxford 1624
- Rector of Remenham, Berkshire

He was appointed to the twelfth stall in Westminster Abbey in 1613, a position he held until 1638.

He was appointed to the fifth stall in St George's Chapel, Windsor Castle in 1625, a position he held until 1638.
