= Archdeacon of Hastings =

Church of England ecclesiastical office

The Archdeacon of Hastings is a senior ecclesiastical officer in the Church of England Diocese of Chichester. The Diocese of Chichester almost exactly covers the counties of East and West Sussex and the City of Brighton and Hove, stretching for nearly a hundred miles (160 km) along the south coast of England.

== History ==
The two original archdeaconries of Chichester diocese, Chichester and Lewes, were created in the 12th century – at around the time when archdeacons were first appointed across England. The third archdeaconry, Hastings, was created (from that of Lewes) on 28 June 1912. The archdeaconries were then reorganised under Eric Kemp (Bishop of Chichester) on 28 June 1975: the Hastings archdeaconry was dissolved and her territory returned to Lewes archdeaconry, which was renamed "Lewes & Hastings"; and a new archdeaconry of Horsham was created.

On 12 May 2014, it was announced that the diocese is to take forward proposals to create a fourth archdeaconry (presently referred to as Brighton.) Since Lewes itself would be within the new archdeaconry, Lewes & Hastings archdeaconry would become simply Hastings archdeaconry. On 8 August 2014, the Church Times reported that the archdeaconry had been renamed.

== List of archdeacons ==
Some archdeacons without territorial titles are recorded from the early 12th century; see Archdeacon of Chichester.

=== High Medieval ===
- bef. 1164–?: Jordan de Melburne (Note: Jordan is not recorded with the title of "Archdeacon of Lewes", but occurs as an archdeacon alongside Henry, Archdeacon of Chichester.)
- bef. 1174–aft. 1199: Joceline (Note: Joceline is not recorded with the title of "Archdeacon of Lewes", but occurs as an archdeacon alongside Matthew of Chichester and Silvester, Archdeacons of Chichester.)
- bef. 1207–aft. 1229 (res.): Eustachius de Leveland
- aft. 1229–aft. 1239: Reginald de Wintonia
- 1240–1241: William de Lughteburg
- 5 March 1244 – 6 June 1252 (d.): Robert Passelewe
- bef. 1253–aft. 1271: Simon de Clympingham
- bef. 1279–aft. 1272: Henry
- bef. 1279–aft. 1283 (res.): Godfrey de Peckham
- bef. 1284–bef. 1301: Thomas de Berghstede

=== Late Medieval ===
- bef. 1301–bef. 1305: Thomas Cobham
- ?–bef. 1305 (res.): John de Godele
- 16 April 1305–aft. 1305: Hamelin de Godele
- bef. 1311–aft. 1313: John Geytentun
- bef. 1316–aft. 1316: William de Estdene
- bef. 1323–aft. 1323: Thomas de Codelowe
- 1339–bef. 1352 (d.): Walter de Lyndrich
- 1352–1358 (res.): William de Loughteburgh
- bef. 1366–aft. 1391: John Courdray
- Walter Forey (ineffective exchange, 8 May 1389)
- Richard Stone
- ?–15 July 1395 (exch.): John Wendover
- 15 July 1395–aft. 1415: John Brampton
- bef. 1419–aft. 1442: Lewis Coychurch
- bef. 1450–aft. 1469: Thomas Hanwell
- 1474–?: William Skylton
- ?–2 March 1475 (exch.): John Dogett
- 2 March 1475 – 1483 (d.): John Plemth
- 1483–1486: Simon Climping
- bef. 1484–bef. 1486 (res.): Thomas Oatley
- 31 May 1486–bef. 1489: Richard Hill
- bef. 1489–1509 (res.): Edward Vaughan
- 22 March 1510–bef. 1512 (res.): William Atwater
- 17 December 1512 – 2 June 1516 (res.): William Cradock
- 30 September 1516 – 12 March 1520 (res.): Oliver Pole
- 12 March 1520–bef. 1527 (res.): Anthony Wayte
- 20 May 1528–bef. 1542 (d.): Edward More

=== Early modern ===
- 14 February 1542 – 1551 (d.): John Sherry
- 22 August 1551–bef. 1558 (d.): Richard Brisley
- 6 April 1558–bef. 1559 (deprived): Robert Taylor (deprived)
- 11 January 1560 – 1570 (d.): Edmund Weston
- 4 March 1570–bef. 1578 (d.): Thomas Drant
- 17 April 1578–bef. 1578 (deprived): William Coell
- 15 October 1578 – 1598 (res.): William Cotton
- 9 December 1598–bef. 1612 (d.): John Mattock
- 30 December 1612 – 12 August 1628 (d.): Richard Buckenham
- 14 March 1629 – 21 February 1644: William Hutchinson
- ?–bef. 1660 (res.): Thomas Hook
- 19 September 1660 – 4 March 1667 (d.): Philip King
- 27 March 1667–bef. 1670 (d.): Nathaniel Hardy
- 9 June 1670–bef. 1681 (d.): Toby Henshaw
- 8 December 1681–bef. 1693 (d.): Joseph Sayer
- 20 October 1693 – 18 August 1723 (d.): Richard Bowchier
- 24 September 1723 – 15 November 1736 (d.): James Williamson
- 25 March 1737 – 28 April 1751 (d.): Edmund Bateman
- 5 June 1751 – 27 January 1770 (d.): Thomas D'Oyly
- 31 May 1770 – 25 February 1806 (d.): John Courtail
- 29 April 1806–bef. 1815 (res.): Matthias D'Oyly
- 25 February 1815–bef. 1823 (res.): Edward Raynes
- 8 May 1823 – 25 February 1840 (d.): Thomas Birch
- 10 April 1840 – 23 January 1855 (d.): Julius Hare
- 6 March 1855 – 25 June 1876 (d.): William Otter

=== Late modern ===
- 1876–1 June 1888 (d.): John Hannah
- 1888–1908 (ret.): Robert Sutton
- 1908–1912 (res.): Theodore Churton (became Archdeacon of Hastings)

Lewes archdeaconry was split on 28 June 1912 to create Hastings archdeaconry.

- 1912–1923 (res.): Henry Southwell (also Bishop suffragan of Lewes from 1920)
- 1923–1929 (res.): Hugh Hordern
- 1929–1946 (ret.): Francis Smythe
- 1946–1959 (res.): Lloyd Morrell
- 1959–1971 (res.): Peter Booth
- 1972–1975: Max Godden (became Archdeacon of Lewes & Hastings)

On 28 June 1975, the Archdeaconry of Lewes was renamed Lewes & Hastings.

=== Archdeacons of Hastings (1912–1975) ===
- 1912–1 June 1915 (d.): Theodore Churton (previously Archdeacon of Lewes)
- 1915–1920 (res.): Benedict Hoskyns
- 1920–22 May 1922 (d.): Arthur Upcott
- 1922–16 October 1928 (d.): Thomas Cook (also Bishop suffragan of Lewes from 1926)
- 1928–1938 (res.): Arthur Alston
- 1938–1956: Ernest Reid
- 1956–1975 (ret.): Guy Mayfield

Hastings archdeaconry was dissolved and merged back into the Archdeaconry of Lewes/Lewes & Hastings on 28 June 1975.

=== Archdeacons of Lewes and Hastings (1975-2014) ===
- 1975–1988 (ret.): Max Godden (previously Archdeacon of Lewes)
- 1989–1991 (ret.): Christopher Luxmoore
- 1991–1997 (ret.): Hugh Glaisyer (archdeacon emeritus since 2007)
- 1997–2004 (res.): Nicholas Reade
- 2005–2014: Philip Jones (became Archdeacon of Hastings)

=== Archdeacons of Hastings (since 2014) ===
- 2014–31 January 2016 (ret.): Philip Jones (previously Archdeacon of Lewes & Hastings; became archdeacon emeritus) (Note: Philp Jones was on sabbatical between 5 January and 29 March 2015.)
- 5 January–29 March 2015: Stan Tomalin (acting)
- 31 January–18 September 2016: Edward Bryant & Nick Cornell (acting)
- 18 September 2016 – 14 September 2024: Edward Dowler (became Dean of Chichester)
- archdeacon-designate: Russell Dewhurst (announced)

== Sources ==
- Greenway, Diana E. (1996), Fasti Ecclesiae Anglicanae 1066–1300, vol. 5, pp. 23–25
- For 1180–1486 archdeacons: Hennessy, George (1900). Chichester Diocese Clergy Lists: Clergy Succession from the earliest time to the year 1900. London: St Peters Press.
- Horn, Joyce M. (1964), Fasti Ecclesiae Anglicanae 1300–1541, vol. 7, pp. 13–14
- Horn, Joyce M. (1971), Fasti Ecclesiae Anglicanae 1541–1857, vol. 2, pp. 17–19
