= Nathaniel Hardy =

English priest (1618–1670)

Nathaniel Hardy (1618–1670) was an English churchman, Dean of Rochester from 1660.

== Life ==
He was son of Anthony Hardy of London, born in the Old Bailey, 14 September 1618, and was baptised in the church of St. Martin's, Ludgate. After being educated in London, he became a commoner of Magdalen Hall, Oxford (1632); graduated B.A. 20 October 1635, and soon after migrated to Hart Hall, where he graduated M. A. 27 June 1638. Returning to London after being ordained at an exceptionally early age, he became a popular preacher with presbyterian leanings.

In 1643 he was appointed preacher to the church of St. Dionis, Backchurch, in Fenchurch Street, where he drew together a congregation chiefly of Presbyterians. In 1645 he was present for the treaty of Uxbridge (negotiations between royal and parliamentary commissioners). He was led by the arguments of Henry Hammond on the chief champion on the episcopalian side to alter his views. On his return to London he preached a sermon of recantation; from that point he was convinced about bishops, though he attended meetings of a Presbyterian as late as 1651. He continued to officiate at St. Dionis. Under the Commonwealth he maintained, without interference from the authorities, a 'Loyal Lecture,' at which monthly collections were made for the suffering clergy, and he usually preached a funeral sermon on the 'Royal Martyrdom.' In 1660, being one of the ministers deputed to attend the commissioners for the City of London, he went over to the Hague to meet Charles II, and preached a sermon which before him. On the king's return to England, he was made one of the royal chaplains in ordinary, and frequently preached in the Chapel Royal.

On 2 August 1660 he was created D.D. of Hart Hall, Oxford; on 10 August he was made rector of St. Dionis, Backchurch, where he had long been preacher; and on 10 December 1660 he became dean of Rochester. In March 1661 he petitioned for the next vacant prebend at Westminster, but does not seem to have obtained it. On 6 April 1661 the king presented him to the vicarage of St. Martin's-in-the-Fields. He was appointed to the living of Henley-on-Thames, 14 November 1661, but resigned it after two months. In December 1661 he was among the clergy of the diocese of Canterbury who testified their conformity in convocation with the new Book of Common Prayer. He was installed archdeacon of Lewes, 6 April 1667. He also held the rectory of Leybourne in Kent for a short time. Hardy died at his house at Croydon, Surrey, after a brief illness, on 1 June 1670, and was buried on the 9th in the chancel of St. Martin's-in-the-Fields. Richard Meggot, dean of Winchester, preached his funeral sermon, and commented on his activity in restoring churches.

Hardy's widow erected a marble tablet to his memory, now in the crypt of St. Martin's. She afterwards married (license dated 6 Dec. 1670) Sir Francis Clarke, knight, of Ulcombe, Kent.

== Works ==
Hardy's published sermons and lectures are:

- Arraignement of Licentious Libertie, 1646, 1647, 1657.
- Justice Triumphing, 1646, 1647, 1648, 1656.
- Faith's Victory over Nature, 1648, 1658.
- A Divine Prospective, 1649, 1654, 1660.
- The Safest Convoy, 1649, 1653.
- Two Mites, or a Grateful Acknowledgement of God's singular Goodness (on recovery from sickness): a, "Mercy in her Beauty," 1653; b, "Thankfulness in Grain," 1653, 1654.
- Divinity in Mortality, 1653, 1659.
- Love and Fear, 1653, 1658.
- Death's Alarm, 1654.
- Epitaph of a Godly Man, 1655.
- Safety in the Midst of Danger, 1656.
- Wisdom's Character, 1656.
- Wisdom's Counterfeit, 1656.
- The first General Epistle of St. John the Apostle, unfolded and applied, pt. i. 22 lectures, 1656; pt. ii. 37 lectures, 1659; republished in Nichol's Series of Commentaries, Edinburgh, 1865.
- The Olive Branch, 1658.
- The Pious Votary, 1658, 1659.
- A Sad Prognostick of Approaching Judgment, 1658, 1660.
- Man's Last Journey to his Long Home, 1659.
- The Pilgrim's Wish, 1659, 1666.
- Carduus Benedictus, 1659.
- A Looking Glasse of Human Frailtie, 1659.
- The Hierarchy Exalted, 1660, 1661.
- The Choicest Fruit of Peace, 1660.
- The Apostolical Liturgie Revised, 1661.
- A Loud Call to Great Mourning, 1662.
- Lamentation, Mourning, and Woe (on the Great Fire of London), 1666.
- The Royal CommonWealth's Man, 1668.

Several Sermons, preached upon solemn Occasions, were collected together, 1658. Another series appeared in 1666. A funeral sermon preached at Cranford on Thomas Fuller was not apparently printed. Hardy frequently complained of the publication of pirated and unauthorised versions of his sermons and prayers.
