= 1980 Labour Party leadership election (UK) =

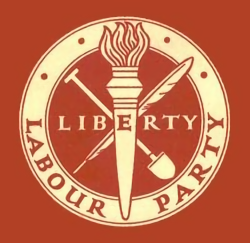
- 4–10 November 1980
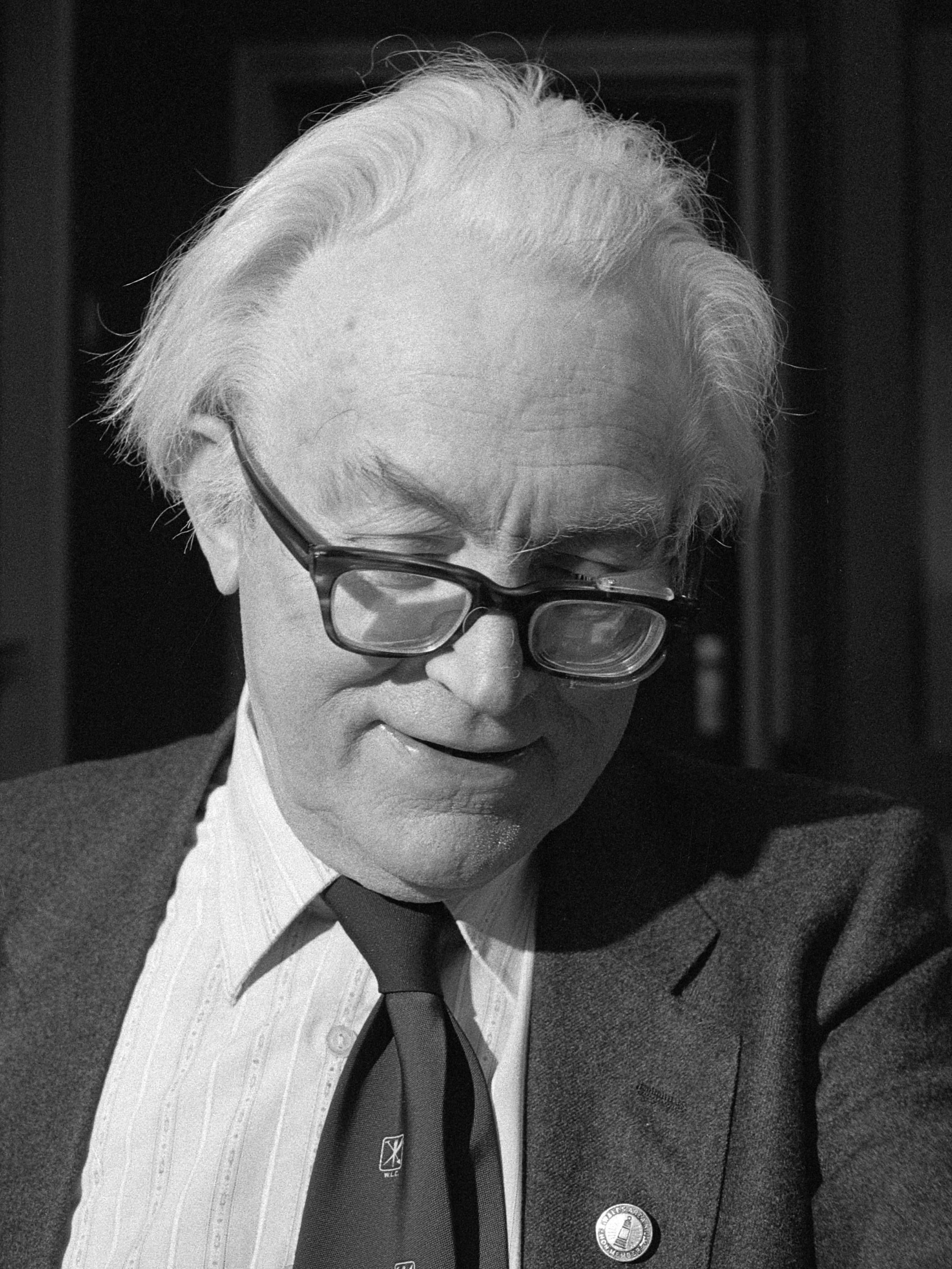

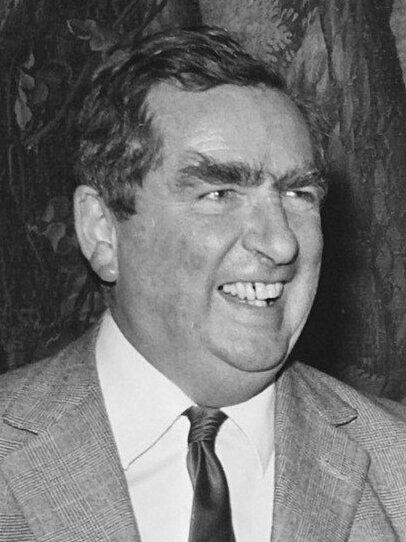

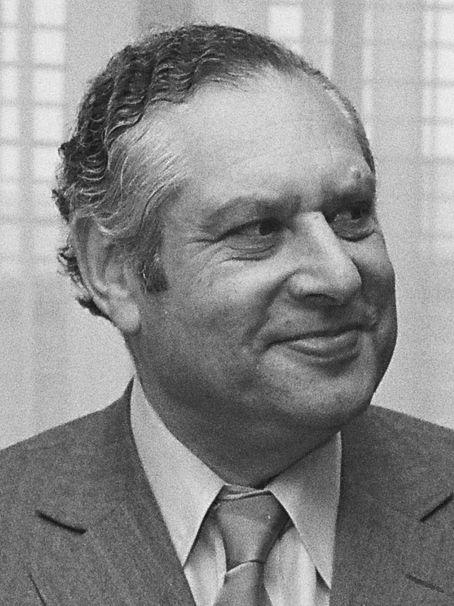
Candidate	Michael Foot	Denis Healey
First ballot	83 (31.3%)	112 (42.3%)
Second ballot	139 (51.9%)	129 (48.1%)
Candidate	John Silkin	Peter Shore
First ballot	38 (14.3%)	32 (12.1%)
Second ballot	Eliminated	Eliminated
Leader before election
James Callaghan
Elected Leader
Michael Foot

The 1980 Labour Party leadership election was held following the resignation of James Callaghan, who had been prime minister from 1976 to 1979 and had stayed on as leader of the Labour Party for eighteen months in order to oversee an orderly transition to his favoured successor, Denis Healey, over his own deputy Michael Foot. However, during this period the party had become bogged down in internal arguments about its procedures and future direction.

Initially the candidates were thought likely to be Denis Healey, Peter Shore and John Silkin, but Michael Foot was persuaded to stand by left-wingers who believed that only he could defeat Healey. In the event, Foot won by a margin of 10 votes in the final ballot of MPs. In 1998 Ivor Crewe and Anthony King alleged that at least five (unnamed) Labour MPs who later defected to the Social Democratic Party (SDP) in 1981 deliberately voted for Foot in order to give the Labour Party a man whom they regarded as an ostensibly unelectable left-wing leader (although none of the SDP's founding Gang of Four did so).

== The race begins ==
On the morning following the announcement of Callaghan's resignation Denis Healey was reported by the press to be the favourite to win the contest. At this point Michael Foot was understood to have decided not to stand, following discussions with Peter Shore as to who was best placed to successfully challenge Healey. John Silkin, who like Foot and Shore was considered to be on the left wing of the Party, had announced his candidacy, but he was not considered to have a realistic chance of beating Healey. It was thought possible that Tony Benn, another potential candidate, might boycott the election. If he stood, however, it was thought another MP on Labour's right wing might stand, possibly Bill Rodgers. At this point the bookmaker Ladbrokes made Healey clear favourite to win, offering odds of 4–5 on his being successful, while in contrast giving Shore odds of 6-1 and Silkin 10–1.

By the following day, though, there was pressure on Foot to stand. While he indicated he had not yet made a final decision, The Glasgow Herald reported that it was thought unlikely that he would change his mind given Silkin made clear he would not withdraw in Foot's favour. Thus the election was reported as being likely to be a three-cornered fight, with Healey's supporters predicting a win for their candidate on the first ballot. Benn, meanwhile, spoke out against the contest, arguing the leadership should not be decided until new franchise rules, which replaced the system of MPs electing the leader with an electoral college, could be brought in in 1981.

Over the weekend following the announcement of Callaghan's resignation Foot faced pressure to run, including from his wife. Indeed he commented that if he did not run "my wife might divorce me." Foot also said he believed he could bring peace to the Labour Party, which was badly divided. Political journalist William Russell reported that Foot's intervention meant the prospects of a Healey win on the first ballot went from being "fair" to being "dashed". For Shore the impact was arguably even more significant. Edward Pearce would later write that whilst Shore had initially been seen as "a serious leadership contender, as candidate of the left against Healey", the nomination of Foot meant that his prospects "went to nothing". Foot's profile was given a boost when Callaghan asked him, in his position as deputy leader, to replace him at Prime Minister's Questions until a new leader was elected.

== Candidates ==
This meant that the following four candidates would contest the leadership:

- Michael Foot, incumbent Deputy Leader of the Labour Party, Member of Parliament for Ebbw Vale
- Denis Healey, Shadow Chancellor of the Exchequer, Member of Parliament for Leeds East
- Peter Shore, Shadow Foreign Secretary, Member of Parliament for Stepney and Poplar
- John Silkin, Shadow Leader of the House of Commons, Member of Parliament for Lewisham Deptford

Foot and Healey both had considerable experience in parliament and government. Foot had been Labour's Deputy Leader since 1976 and had been Leader of the House of Commons in the last Labour government. He had stood for election to parliament in 1935 and had first been elected to the House of Commons in 1945, losing his seat in 1955, before returning to the House of Commons at a 1960 by-election. Healey had had two long spells in government, having served as Chancellor of the Exchequer from 1974 to 1979 and as Secretary of State for Defence from 1964 until 1970. He had first stood for parliament in 1945 and had been an MP since 1952. Like Foot he had been an unsuccessful candidate in the last Labour leadership contest

Although both Shore and Silkin had served less than 20 years in parliament, they too had previously served as cabinet ministers. Shore had been in the House of Commons since 1964 and had held a number of ministerial appointments in the Wilson and Callaghan governments, also serving as Harold Wilson's parliamentary private secretary between 1965 and 1966. He also had a reputation as "an inveterate anti-European" and had supported Foot's unsuccessful bid to become Labour leader in 1976. Silkin had first been elected in 1963 and had held various governmental roles including serving as Government Chief Whip from 1966 until 1969.

== Results ==
The result of the first ballot of Labour MPs on 4 November was as follows:

First ballot: 4 November 1980
Candidate	Votes	%
Denis Healey	112	42.3
Michael Foot	83	31.3
John Silkin	38	14.3
Peter Shore	32	12.1
Majority	29	11.0
Turnout	265	N/A
Second ballot required

The result eliminated Shore and Silkin and meant Healey and Foot competed to win over their supporters. Although Healey enjoyed a clear lead, it was predicted that the final result would be narrow, with a majority of single figures reported to be likely.

The second ballot, a run-off between Healey and Foot, was held six days after the first vote.

Second ballot: 10 November 1980
Candidate	Votes	%
Michael Foot	139	51.9
Denis Healey	129	48.1
Majority	10	3.8
Turnout	268	N/A
Michael Foot elected

Although political commentators had expected Healey to win, Foot emerged victorious by a margin of 10 votes in a surprise result. One suggested explanation for this outcome was that Foot's popularity as an MP meant that even his opponents within the party felt that he had a better chance of uniting Labour than Healey. Writing after Healey's death in 2015, David McKie argued that Labour MPs opted for Foot over "the combative Healey" as they wanted "a quiet life" at a time of internal party divisions, and also noted that the fact Healey had recently been involved in a dispute with Labour's left alienated both those who opposed his views, but also his sympathisers who felt that his actions had been damaging to the party.

Anthony Howard, in an article published as an obituary of Healey in 2015 but written prior to Howard's own death in 2010, argued that Labour should have immediately changed its leader following its defeat in the 1979 general election. He implied that such a course of action would have brought the leadership to Healey. He further contended that by 1980 civil war had broken out in the party. That meant Healey, as the candidate of the right, lost support of those MPs who wanted "peace at any price" and the later founders of the SDP who, for "kamikaze reasons", desired Foot's election, which they hoped would provide the basis for the party to split. Howard argued that those factors meant that the result of the election "was pre-ordained".

In an essay exploring why Healey never became Prime Minister, Steve Richards notes that while in 1980 "Healey was widely seen as the obvious successor to Callaghan", and that sections of the media reacted with "disbelief" at Labour not choosing him to be leader the "choice of Foot was not as perverse as it seemed". He argues Labour MPs were looking for a figure from the left who could unite the wider party with the leadership. Richards states that despite being on the left of the party Foot was not a "tribal politician" and had proved he could work with those of different ideologies and had been a loyal deputy to Callaghan. Thus Foot, rather than Healey, "was seen as the unity candidate". Richards also claims that Healey's election "would have been seen as an act of provocation by a significant section" of Labour's membership as the party had been moving leftwards.

== Aftermath ==
Foot's reaction to his victory included telling reporters that he was "as strong in my socialist convictions as I have ever been", suggesting that he would not abandon his position on Labour's left. Foot's election was considered an important factor in the creation of the SDP by figures from Labour's right the following year. Ultimately Foot's hopes of leading Labour to victory were dashed as the Conservatives under Margaret Thatcher won a landslide victory at the next general election in 1983 and Labour achieved only a 27.6% share of the vote, its worst performance since 1918.

This was the last Labour leadership election to be conducted amongst Members of Parliament only; an electoral college was introduced for future contests.
