= James Callaghan =

Prime Minister of the United Kingdom from 1976 to 1979

The Right Honourable The Lord Callaghan of Cardiff KG PC
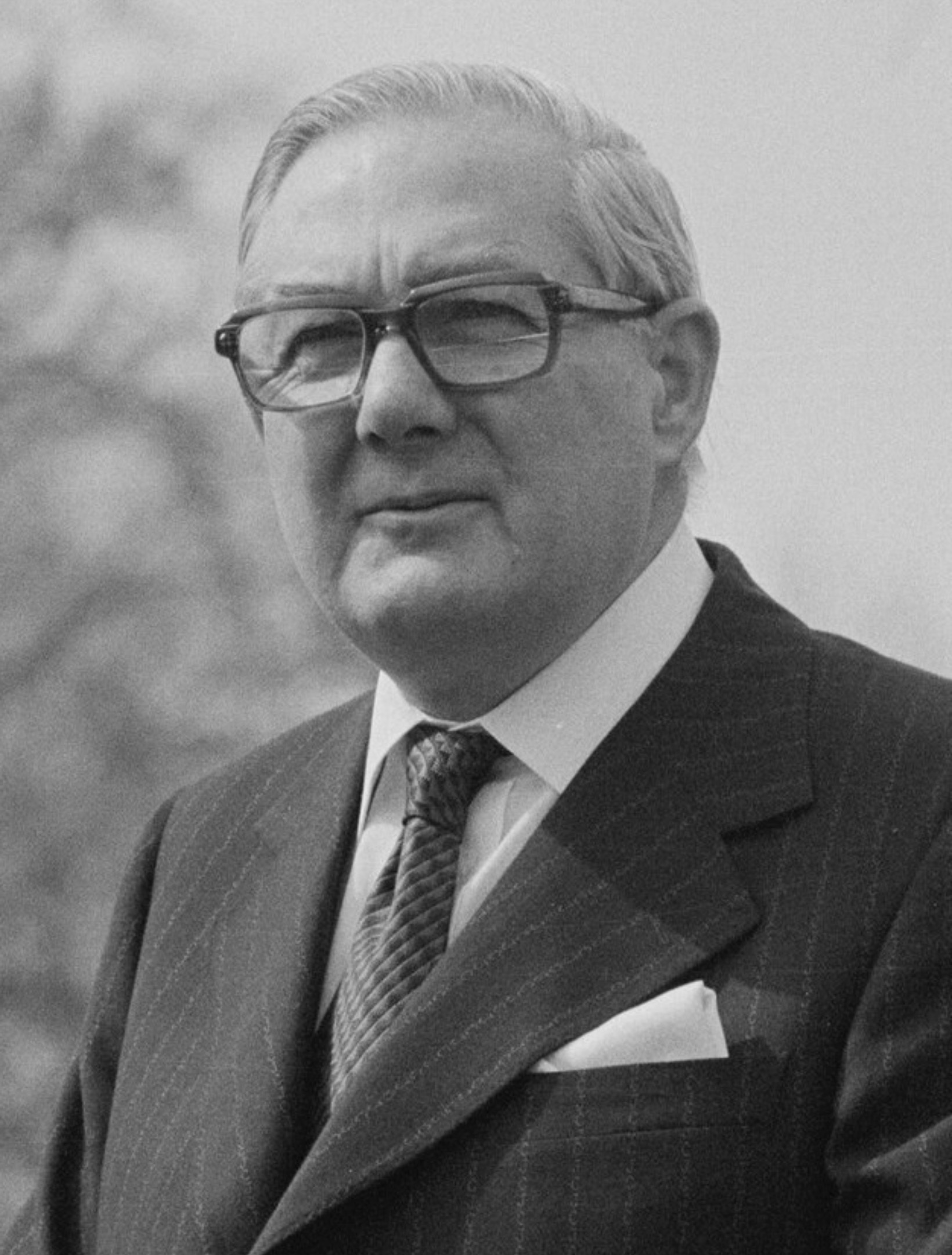
- Callaghan in 1977

Prime Minister of the United Kingdom
- In office 5 April 1976 – 4 May 1979
- Monarch: Elizabeth II
- Preceded by: Harold Wilson
- Succeeded by: Margaret Thatcher
Senior political offices
Leader of the Opposition
In office 4 May 1979 – 10 November 1980
Monarch	Elizabeth II
Prime Minister	Margaret Thatcher
Preceded by	Margaret Thatcher
Succeeded by	Michael Foot
Leader of the Labour Party
In office 5 April 1976 – 10 November 1980
Deputy	Michael Foot
Preceded by	Harold Wilson
Succeeded by	Michael Foot
Ministerial offices
Foreign Secretary
In office 5 March 1974 – 8 April 1976
Prime Minister	Harold Wilson
Preceded by	Alec Douglas-Home
Succeeded by	Anthony Crosland
Home Secretary
In office 30 November 1967 – 19 June 1970
Prime Minister	Harold Wilson
Preceded by	Roy Jenkins
Succeeded by	Reginald Maudling
Chancellor of the Exchequer
In office 16 October 1964 – 30 November 1967
Prime Minister	Harold Wilson
Preceded by	Reginald Maudling
Succeeded by	Roy Jenkins
Shadow cabinet offices
Shadow Secretary of State
1970–1971	Home Department
1971–1972	Employment
1972–1974	Foreign and Commonwealth Affairs
1961–1964	Shadow Chancellor of the Exchequer
Junior ministerial offices
Parliamentary Under-Secretary of State
1947–1950	Ministry of Transport
1950–1951	Admiralty
Parliamentary offices
Member of the House of Lords
Lord Temporal
Life peerage 5 November 1987 – 26 March 2005
Father of the House of Commons
In office 9 June 1983 – 18 May 1987
Preceded by	John Parker
Succeeded by	Bernard Braine
Member of Parliament
In office 5 July 1945 – 18 May 1987
Preceded by	Arthur Evans
Succeeded by	Alun Michael
Constituency	Cardiff South (1945–1950); Cardiff South East (1950–1983); Cardiff South and Penarth (1983–1987)

Personal details
- Born: Leonard James Callaghan; 27 March 1912 Portsmouth, Hampshire, England
- Died: 26 March 2005 (aged 92) Burgess Hill, West Sussex, England
- Party: Labour
- Spouse: Audrey Moulton (m. 1938; died 2005)
- Children: 3, including Margaret Jay
- Education: Portsmouth Northern Secondary School

Military service
- Branch/service: Royal Navy
- Years of service: 1942–1945
- Rank: Sub-lieutenant
- Battles/wars: Second World War

Leonard James Callaghan, Baron Callaghan of Cardiff (/ˈkæləhæn/ KAL-ə-han; 27 March 1912 – 26 March 2005) was Prime Minister of the United Kingdom from 1976 to 1979 and Leader of the Labour Party from 1976 to 1980. Callaghan is the only person to have held all four Great Offices of State, having also served as Chancellor of the Exchequer from 1964 to 1967, Home Secretary from 1967 to 1970 and Foreign Secretary from 1974 to 1976. He was a member of Parliament (MP) from 1945 to 1987.

Born into a working-class family in Portsmouth, Callaghan left school early and began his career as a tax inspector, before becoming a trade union official in the 1930s. He served as a sub-lieutenant in the Royal Navy during the Second World War. He was elected to Parliament at the 1945 election, and was at that time regarded as being on the left wing of the Labour Party. He was appointed to the Attlee government as a parliamentary secretary in 1947, and began to move increasingly towards the right wing of the Labour Party, while maintaining his reputation as a "Keeper of the Cloth Cap" – that is, seen as maintaining close ties between Labour and the trade unions. Following Labour's defeat at the 1951 election, Callaghan increasingly became regarded as a leader of the right wing of the Labour Party, and stood for the positions of deputy leader in 1960 and for leader in 1963, but was defeated by George Brown for the former and Harold Wilson for the latter.

Following Labour's victory at the 1964 election, Wilson appointed Callaghan as Chancellor of the Exchequer; his tenure coincided with a turbulent period for the British economy, during which Callaghan had to tackle both a chronic balance of payments deficit and various speculative attacks on the pound sterling, with its exchange rate to other currencies being fixed by the Bretton Woods system. On 18 November 1967, having initially denied that it would do so, the Government devalued the pound sterling. In the wake of the decision, Wilson moved Callaghan to the role of Home Secretary. During this time, Callaghan was responsible for overseeing the operations of the British Army to support the police in Northern Ireland, following a request from the Northern Ireland government. Callaghan remained in the Shadow Cabinet during Labour's period in Opposition from 1970 to 1974; upon Labour's victory at the 1974 election, Wilson appointed Callaghan as Foreign Secretary. Callaghan was responsible for renegotiating the terms of Britain's membership of the European Communities (EC), and strongly supported the successful "Yes" vote campaign in the 1975 referendum, which confirmed the UK's membership of the EC.

When Wilson suddenly announced his retirement in March 1976, Callaghan defeated five other candidates to be elected Leader of the Labour Party; he was appointed Prime Minister on 5 April 1976. Labour had won a narrow majority in the House of Commons at the October 1974 election but, through by-election defeats, had lost this by the time Callaghan became prime minister; and several by-election defeats and defections in his early months of power forced him to strike a confidence and supply agreement with the Liberal Party. This had ended by the time of significant industrial disputes and widespread strikes in the 1978–79 "Winter of Discontent"–which, followed by the defeat of the referendum on devolution for Scotland, led to minor parties joining with the Conservative Party to pass a motion of no-confidence in Callaghan on 28 March 1979. Although remaining personally popular in opinion polls, he led Labour to defeat at the 1979 election and was replaced by Conservative Margaret Thatcher. The 1979 defeat marked the beginning of 18 years in opposition for the Labour Party, the longest in its history.

Callaghan carried on as Labour leader and Leader of the Opposition until November 1980, during which time he attempted to reform the process by which Labour elected its leader. After leaving the leadership he returned to the backbenches, and between 1983 and 1987 was Father of the House of Commons. On retiring from the Commons in 1987, he was elevated to the House of Lords as Baron Callaghan of Cardiff. He died in 2005 at the age of 92, and remains to date the UK's longest-lived former prime minister. He is the most recent prime minister to have served in the British Armed Forces and the only prime minister to have served in the Royal Navy.

== Early life and career, 1912–1945 ==
Leonard James Callaghan was born on 27 March 1912 at 38 Funtington Road, Copnor, Portsmouth, England. He took his middle name from his father James (1877–1921), who was the son of an Irish Catholic father (who had fled to England during the Great Irish Famine) and a Jewish mother. Callaghan's father had left home in the 1890s to join the Royal Navy, giving a false birthday and changing his surname from Garoghan to Callaghan to hide the fact that he was a year too young to enlist. He served in the First World War on board the battleship HMS Agincourt and rose to the rank of Chief Petty Officer.

Callaghan's mother was Charlotte Callaghan (née Cundy 1879–1961), an English Baptist. As the Catholic Church at the time refused to marry Catholics to members of other denominations, James Callaghan senior abandoned Catholicism and married Charlotte in a Baptist chapel. Their first child was Dorothy Gertrude Callaghan (1904–82).

When Callaghan's father was demobbed in 1919, he joined the Coastguard and moved the family to the town of Brixham in Devon. He died only two years later, in 1921, of a heart attack at the age of 44, plunging the family into poverty, and forcing them to rely on charity to survive. Their financial situation was improved in 1924 when the first Labour government was elected, and introduced changes allowing Mrs Callaghan to be granted a widow's pension of ten shillings a week, on the basis that her husband's death was partly due to his war service.

=== Early career ===
In his early years, Callaghan was known by his first name Leonard. When he entered politics in 1945 he decided to be known by his middle name James, and from then on he was referred to as James or Jim. He attended Portsmouth Northern Secondary School. He gained the Senior Oxford Certificate in 1929, but could not afford entrance to university and instead sat the Civil Service entrance exam. At the age of 17, Callaghan left to work as a clerk for the Inland Revenue at Maidstone in Kent. While working at the Inland Revenue, Callaghan joined the Maidstone branch of the Labour Party and the Association of the Officers of Taxes (AOT), a trade union for this branch of the civil service; within a year of joining he became the office secretary of the union. In 1932, he passed a Civil Service exam that enabled him to become a senior tax officer, and in the same year he became the Kent branch secretary of the AOT. The following year he was elected to the AOT's national executive council. In 1934, he was transferred to Inland Revenue offices in London. Following a merger of unions in 1936, Callaghan was appointed a full-time union official and to the post of assistant secretary of the Inland Revenue Staff Federation (IRSF), and resigned from his Civil Service duties.

During his time working in the Inland Revenue in the early 1930s, Callaghan met his future wife Audrey Moulton, and they were married in July 1938 at Maidstone.

His union position at the IRSF brought Callaghan into contact with Harold Laski, the Chairman of the Labour Party's National Executive Committee and an academic at the London School of Economics (LSE). Laski encouraged him to stand for Parliament, although later he requested several times that Callaghan study and lecture at the LSE.

=== War service ===
In 1940, following the outbreak of the Second World War, Callaghan applied to join the Royal Navy, but was initially turned down on the basis that a trade union official was deemed to be a reserved occupation. He was finally allowed to join the Royal Navy Volunteer Reserve as an ordinary seaman in 1942. While he trained for his promotion, his medical examination revealed that he was suffering from tuberculosis, so he was admitted to the Royal Naval Hospital Haslar in Gosport near Portsmouth. After he recovered, he was discharged and assigned to duties with the Admiralty in Whitehall. He was assigned to the Japanese section, and wrote a service manual for the Royal Navy The Enemy: Japan. He then served in the East Indies Fleet on board the escort carrier HMS Activity, and was promoted to the rank of sub-lieutenant in April 1944. As of 2025, Callaghan remains the last British prime minister to be an armed forces veteran and the only one ever to have served in the Royal Navy.

While on leave from the Navy, Callaghan was selected as a Parliamentary candidate for Cardiff South: he narrowly won the local party ballot with twelve votes, against the next highest candidate George Thomas, who received eleven. Callaghan had been encouraged to put his name forward for the Cardiff South seat by his friend Dai Kneath, a member of the IRSF National executive from Swansea, who was in turn an associate and friend of the local Labour Party secretary, Bill Headon.

By 1945, he was serving on HMS Queen Elizabeth in the Indian Ocean. After VE Day, he returned, along with other prospective candidates, to the United Kingdom to stand in the general election.

== Political career, 1945–1976 ==
=== Member of Parliament ===
The Labour Party won the overdue general election in a landslide victory on 26 July 1945, bringing Clement Attlee to power, in charge of the first-ever majority Labour government. Callaghan won his Cardiff South seat at the 1945 general election (and would hold a Cardiff-area seat continuously until his retirement in 1987). He defeated the sitting Conservative MP, Sir Arthur Evans, by 17,489 votes to 11,545. He campaigned on such issues as the rapid demobilisation of the armed forces and for a new housing construction programme. He stood on the left wing of the party, and was a vocal critic of the United States in 1945, joining 22 other rebels in voting against accepting the Anglo-American loan. Callaghan did not join the Keep Left group of left-wing Labour MPs, but he did sign a letter in 1947 with 20 other MPs from the group calling for a 'socialist foreign policy' which would create an alternative to the capitalism of the United States and the totalitarianism of the USSR.

=== Junior minister, 1947–1951 ===
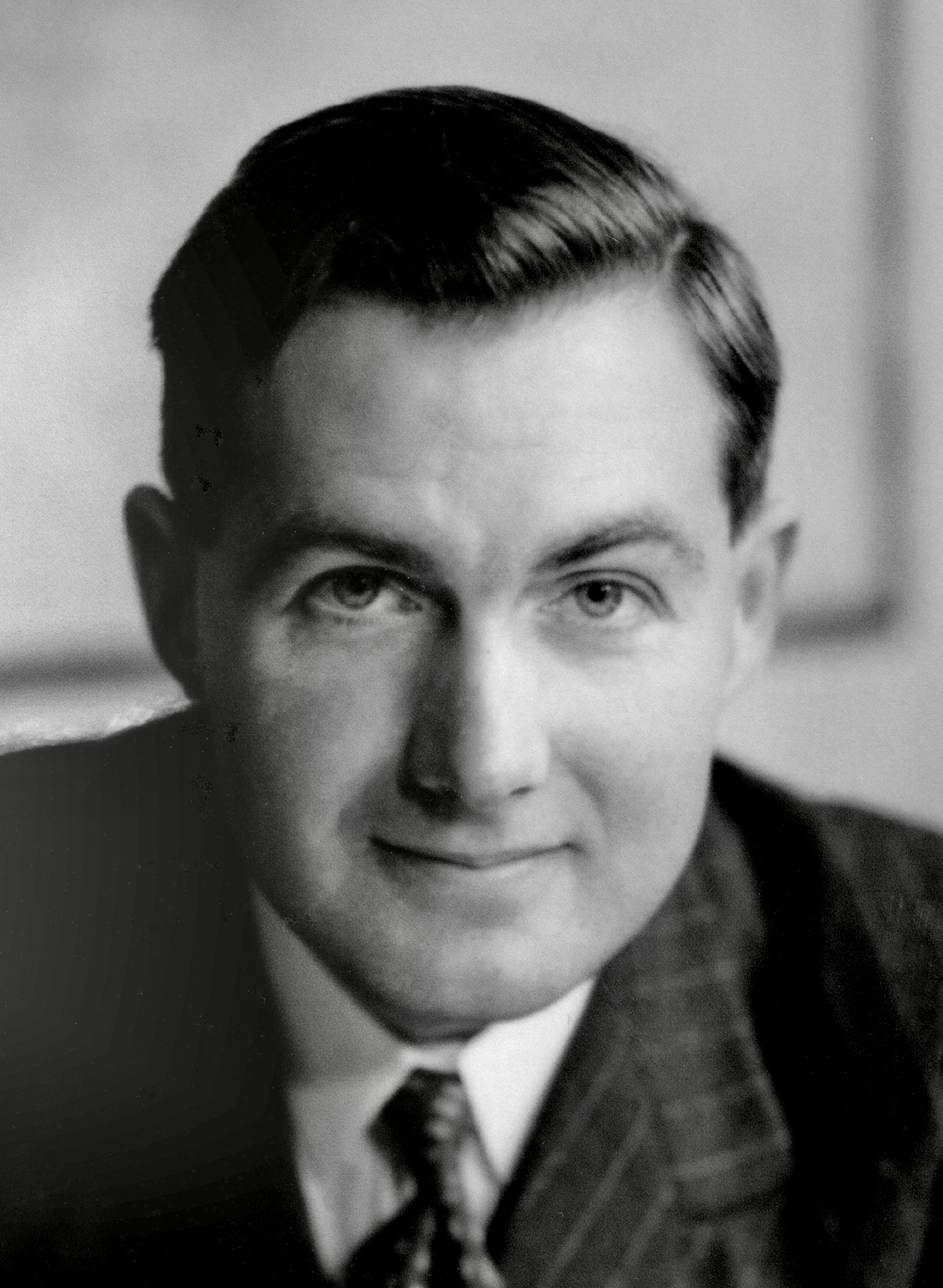
Callaghan in 1947

In October 1947, at the age of 35, Callaghan got his first junior ministerial job, when he was appointed Parliamentary Secretary to the Ministry of Transport under Alfred Barnes. Callaghan was given responsibility for improving road safety; in this role he persuaded the government to introduce zebra crossings, and was responsible for the introduction of cat's eyes on trunk roads, after overcoming the scepticism of transport officials. Callaghan did not oppose the government's use of emergency powers to break dockers' strikes in both 1948 and 1949; however, he sympathised with the feelings of ordinary dockers, and wrote to Attlee to protest over how the Dock Labour Scheme was operated.

In February 1950 he was appointed as Parliamentary and Financial Secretary to the Admiralty. He was a delegate to the Council of Europe, where he supported plans for economic co-operation but resisted plans for a European army. When the Korean War broke out in 1950, Callaghan was given responsibility for deciding how the money allocated to the Royal Navy for rearmament was spent.

=== In opposition, 1951–1964 ===
After Labour lost power in the 1951 general election, Callaghan, who was popular with Labour MPs, was elected to the Shadow Cabinet; he would serve on the party's front bench for the next 29 years, either in opposition or in government. He was now associated with the Gaitskellite wing of the party on the Labour right, although he avoided joining any faction. He served as the Labour shadow minister for Transport (1951–53); Fuel and Power (1953–55); Colonial Affairs (1956–61) and served as Shadow Chancellor (1961–64). In 1960, he ran unsuccessfully for the Deputy Leadership of the party, coming third out of three candidates. When the party leader Hugh Gaitskell died in January 1963, Callaghan ran to succeed him, but again came third in the leadership contest, which was won by Harold Wilson.

=== Chancellor of the Exchequer, 1964–1967 ===
In October 1964, Conservative Prime Minister Alec Douglas-Home (who had only been in power for twelve months since the resignation of Harold Macmillan) was forced to call a general election, the parliament being about to expire. Labour won a narrow majority of four seats. The new Labour government under Harold Wilson immediately faced economic problems and Callaghan was appointed as the new Chancellor of the Exchequer. Callaghan's time as chancellor was characterised by an ultimately doomed effort to stave off devaluation of the pound: The previous chancellor, Reginald Maudling, had initiated fiscally expansionary measures that had helped create a pre-election economic boom. By greatly increasing domestic demand, this had caused imports to grow much faster than exports; thus, when Labour entered government it faced a balance of payments deficit of £800,000,000 (equivalent to £14.2 billion in 2025) and sterling, which was then on a fixed exchange rate came under immediate speculative attack. Both Wilson and Callaghan took a strong stance against devaluation of sterling, which would have made British exports more competitive, partly due to the perception that the devaluation carried out by the previous Labour government in 1949 had contributed to that government's downfall. The alternative to devaluation, however, was a series of austerity measures designed to reduce demand in the economy in order to reduce imports, and to stabilise the balance of payments and the value of sterling.

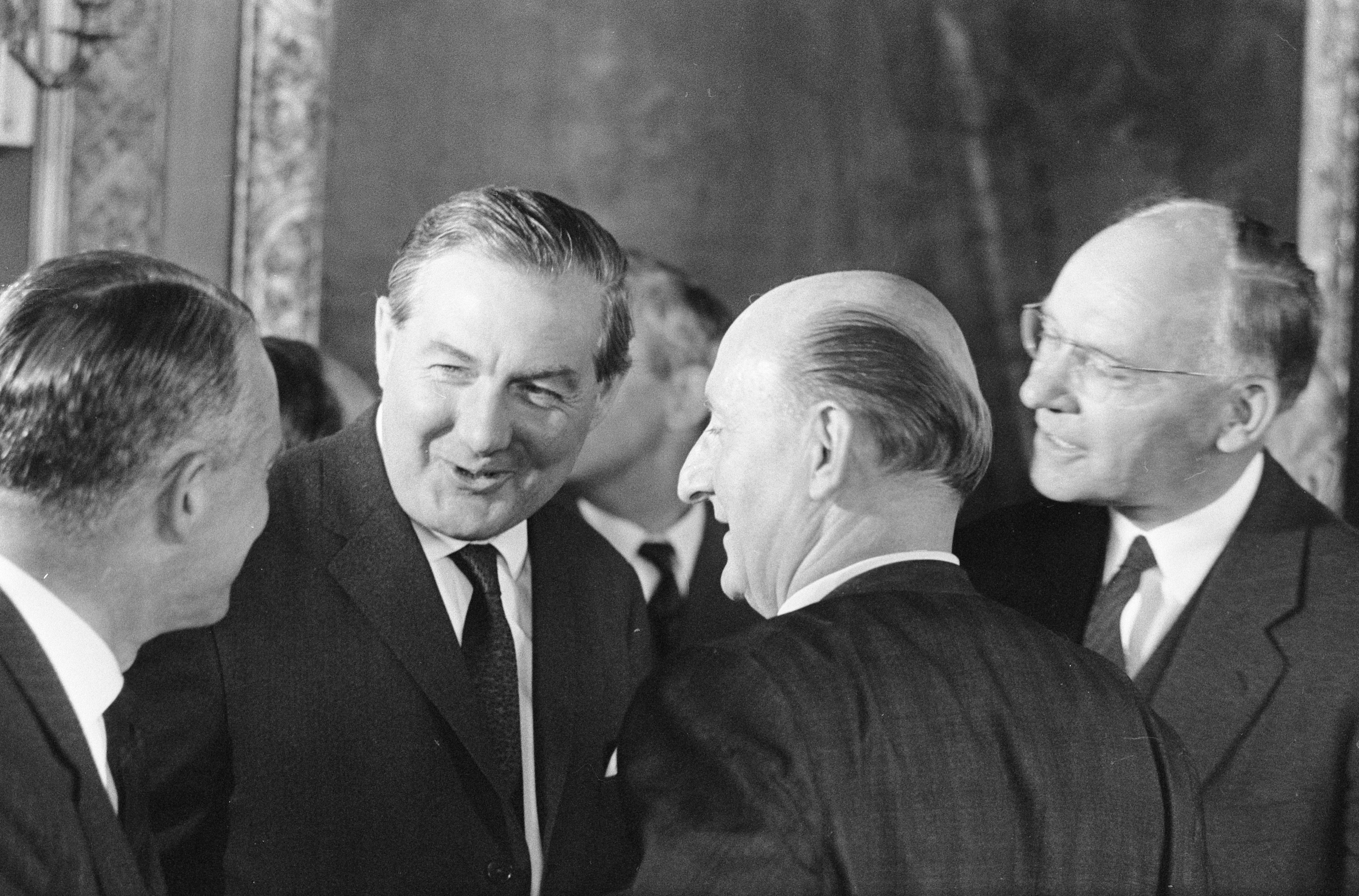
Callaghan (second left) with finance ministers in The Hague, 1966

Just ten days after taking up his post, Callaghan immediately introduced a 15% surcharge on imports, with the exception of foodstuffs and raw materials. This measure was intended to tackle the balance of payments deficit; however, it caused an uproar amongst Britain's international trading partners. The outcry was so intense that it caused the government to announce that the surcharge was a temporary measure. Callaghan later admitted in his autobiography that he could have handled the matter better, and in his haste to tackle the balance of payments problem, had failed to consult foreign governments.

On 11 November, Callaghan gave his first budget and announced increases in income tax, petrol tax and the introduction of a new capital gains tax, actions which most economists deemed necessary to take the heat out of the balance and sterling deficit. In line with Labour's manifesto commitments, the budget also contained social measures to increase the state pension and the widows pension; measures which were disliked by the City and speculators, causing a run on the pound. On 23 November, it was decided to increase the bank rate from 2% to 7%, which generated a large amount of criticism. Handling the situation was made more difficult by the attitude of Lord Cromer, the governor of the Bank of England, who argued against the fiscal policies of the new Labour government. When Callaghan and Wilson threatened to call a new general election, the governor soon raised a £3,000,000,000 loan to stabilise the reserves and the deficit.

His second budget came on 6 April 1965, in which he announced efforts to deflate the economy and reduce home import demand by £250,000,000. Shortly afterwards, the bank rate was reduced from 7% down to 6%. For a brief time, the economy and British financial market stabilised, allowing in June for Callaghan to visit the United States and to discuss the state of the British economy with President Lyndon B. Johnson and the International Monetary Fund (IMF).

In July the pound came under extreme pressure, and Callaghan was forced to create harsh temporary measures to demonstrate control of the economy. These included delaying all current government building projects and postponing new pension plans. The alternative was to devalue the pound (or, which would at first have amounted to the same thing, to allow it to float). Callaghan and Wilson, however, were again adamant that a devaluation of the pound would create new social and economic problems and continued to take a firm stance against it. The government continued to struggle both with the economy and with the slender majority which, by 1966, had been reduced to one. On 28 February, Harold Wilson formally announced an election for 31 March 1966. On 1 March, Callaghan gave a 'little budget' to the Commons and announced the historic decision that the UK would adopt decimal currency. (Not until Decimal Day in 1971, under a Conservative government, did the United Kingdom move from the system of pounds, shillings and pence to a decimal system of 100 pence to the pound.) He also announced a short-term mortgage scheme which allowed low-wage earners to maintain mortgage schemes in the face of economic difficulties. Soon afterwards, at the 1966 general election, Labour won 363 seats compared to 252 seats against the Conservatives, giving the Labour government an increased majority of 97 seats.

Callaghan introduced his next Budget on 4 May. He had informed the house that he would bring a full Budget to the House when he made his 'little budget' speech prior to the election. The main point of his budget was the introduction of a Selective Employment Tax, penalising the service industry and favouring the manufacturing industry. Twelve days after the budget, the National Union of Seamen called a national strike and the problems facing sterling were multiplied. Additional strikes caused the balance of payments deficit to increase. However, a £3,300,000,000 loan from Swiss banks was due by the end of the year. On 14 July the bank rate was increased again to seven percent, and on 20 July Callaghan announced a ten-point emergency package to deal with the crisis which included further tax rises and a six-month freeze on wage increases. By early 1967, the economy had begun to stabilise once again with the balance of payments moving into equilibrium, the bank rate was reduced to 6% in March and 5.5% in May.

It was under these conditions that Callaghan beat Michael Foot in a vote to become Treasurer of the Labour Party.

The economy was soon in turmoil again by June, with the Six-Day War in the Middle East. Several Arab countries, such as Kuwait and Iraq, announced an oil embargo against Britain, accusing it of intervening on the Israeli side in the conflict, resulting in a rise in oil prices which had a disastrous effect on the balance of payments. Furthermore, the economy was hit in mid-September when a national dock strike lasted for eight weeks. The final straw, however, was an EEC report which suggested that the pound could not be sustained as a reserve currency and it was suggested again that the pound should be devalued. Callaghan responded by pointing out that, had it not been for the Middle East crisis, Britain would have been heading for a balance of payments surplus in 1967. However, rumours that devaluation was on the cards led to heavy selling of sterling on world markets.

Callaghan now privately confided in Wilson that he doubted that the pound could be saved; this was reinforced after a meeting with Alec Cairncross, head of the Government Economic Service, who told him in no uncertain terms that the value of sterling could not be maintained, and in his view it should be devalued as soon as possible. The IMF offered a contingency fund of $3 billion, but Wilson and Callaghan refused this because of several conditions attached, which they believed would allow the IMF to interfere with economic policy. On Wednesday 15 November, the historic decision was taken to commit the government to a 14.3% devaluation from the existing fixed exchange rate of $2.80 to the pound, to $2.40 to the pound. They intended to announce the decision publicly on 18 November. However, in the run-up to the public announcement, Callaghan found himself in a tricky situation when answering questions in the House of Commons: one backbencher, Robert Sheldon, tabled a motion concerning a rumour that Britain would be receiving a loan from banks. Callaghan did not wish to lie to the Commons, but at the same time going public about the devaluation decision before the 18th would be financially disastrous for the country. He answered the initial question by stating that he did not comment on rumours. However, a follow-up question was made by Stan Orme suggesting that devaluation was preferable to deflation, which caused a major problem. Callaghan replied that he had "nothing to add or subtract from, anything I have said on previous occasions on the subject of devaluation"... Speculators seized on the fact that he had not specifically denied that there would be a devaluation and started selling sterling. Over the next 24 hours, the flight from sterling cost the country £1,500 million (equivalent to £23.9 billion in 2025) The situation was a great political controversy at the time. As Denis Healey in his autobiography notes:

Nowadays exchange rates can swing to and fro continually by an amount greater than that, without attracting much attention outside the City columns of the newspapers. It may be difficult to understand how great a political humiliation this devaluation appeared at the time—above all to Wilson and his Chancellor, Jim Callaghan, who felt he must resign over it. Callaghan's personal distress was increased by a careless answer he gave to a backbencher's question two days before the formal devaluation. This cost Britain several hundred million pounds.

Before the devaluation, Callaghan had announced publicly to the Press and the House of Commons that he would not devalue; this, he later said, was necessary to maintain confidence in the pound and avoid creating jitters in the financial markets. Callaghan immediately offered his resignation as chancellor, and increasing political opposition forced Wilson to accept it. Wilson then appointed Roy Jenkins, the home secretary, as chancellor; Callaghan became the new home secretary on 30 November 1967.

=== Home secretary, 1967–1970 ===
Callaghan was responsible for the Commonwealth Immigrants Act 1968, a controversial piece of legislation prompted by Conservative assertions that an influx of Kenyan Asians would soon inundate the country. It passed through the Commons in a week and placed entry controls on holders of British passports who had "no substantial connection" with Britain by setting up a new system. In his memoirs Time and Chance, Callaghan wrote that introducing the Commonwealth Immigrants Bill had been an unwelcome task but that he did not regret it. He said the Asians had "discovered a loophole", and he told a BBC interviewer: "Public opinion in this country was extremely agitated, and the consideration that was in my mind was how we could preserve a proper sense of order in this country and, at the same time, do justice to these people – I had to balance both considerations". An opponent of the Act, Conservative MP Ian Gilmour, said that it was "brought in to keep the blacks out. If it had been the case that it was 5,000 white settlers who were coming in, the newspapers and politicians, Callaghan included, who were making all the fuss would have been quite pleased".

Also significant was the passing of the Race Relations Act 1968, making it illegal to refuse employment, housing or education on the basis of ethnic background. The Act extended the powers of the Race Relations Board at the time, to deal with complaints of discrimination and unfair attitudes. It also set up a new supervisory body, the Community Relations Commission, to promote "harmonious community relations". Presenting the Bill to Parliament, Callaghan said: "The House has rarely faced an issue of greater social significance for our country and our children."

It was under Callaghan's watch that the abolition of capital punishment for murder became permanent: The Murder (Abolition of Death Penalty) Act 1965, had a sunset clause inserted into it by the Lords to limit its application to five years, which meant it would have expired in 1970, and would have to be brought back to the Commons. Callaghan, who had said that he would rather resign as Home Secretary than sanction an execution spoke in favour of abolition. There was a free vote on the matter on 16 December 1969, and MPs voted in favour of abolition by 345 to 185.

==== Northern Ireland ====
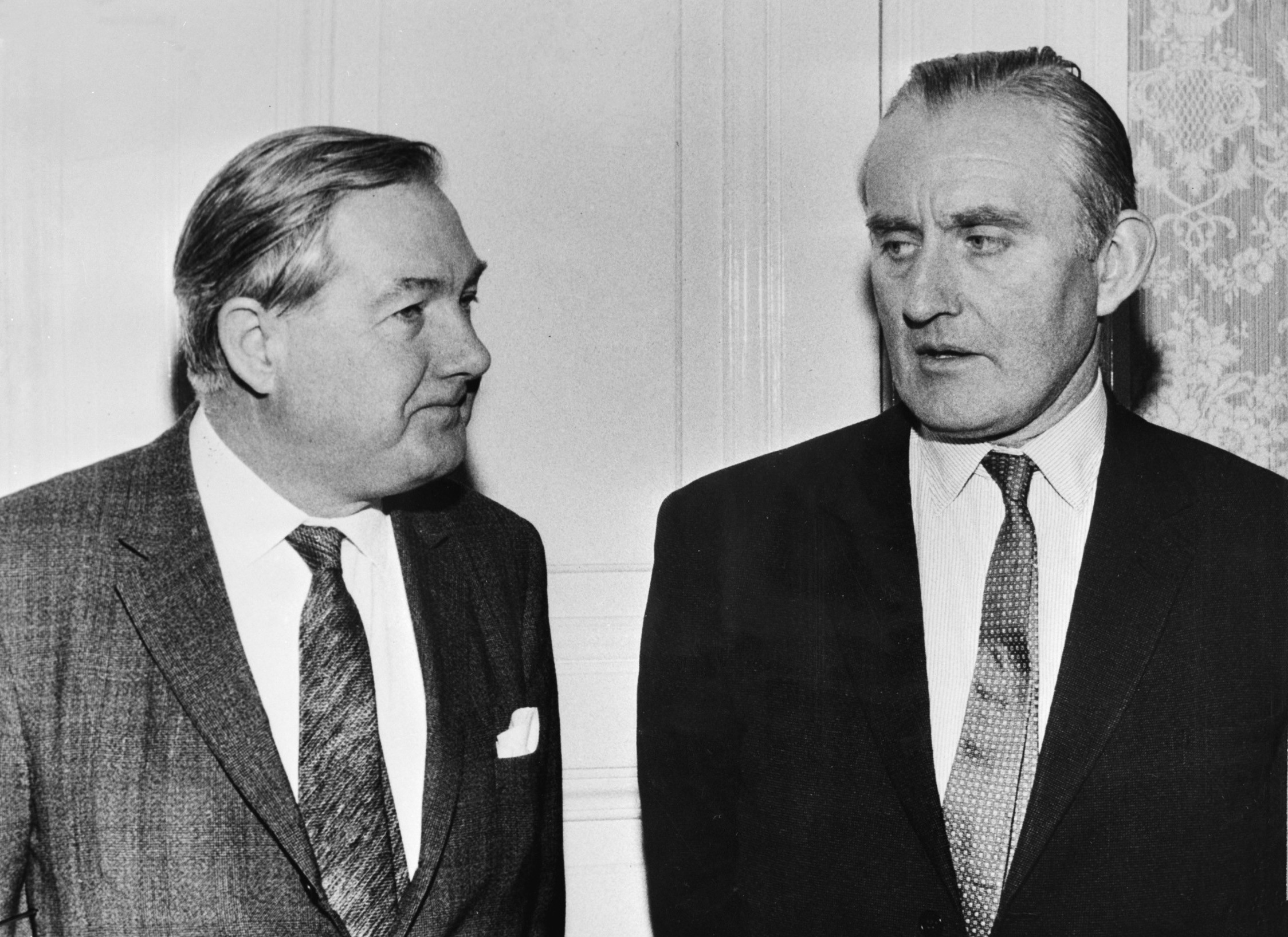
Callaghan in 1970 (left), with Prime Minister of Northern Ireland James Chichester-Clark

Callaghan's tenure as home secretary was marked by the emerging conflict in Northern Ireland: Like all British governments since the partition of Ireland in 1921, Harold Wilson's Labour government preferred not to intervene in the affairs of Northern Ireland. However, in August 1969, escalating sectarian violence between the province's Protestant and Catholic communities, gave the Government of Northern Ireland little choice but to ask the British government to intervene directly and send in troops, and it was as home secretary that Callaghan took the decision to deploy British Army troops in the province. In return Callaghan and Wilson demanded that various reforms be implemented in the province, such as the phasing out of the Protestant paramilitary B-Specials, and their replacement by the Ulster Defence Regiment, which was open to Catholic recruits, and various reforms to reduce discrimination against Catholics, such as reforms to the voting franchise, and a reform of local government boundaries and housing allocations. Although the troops were initially welcomed by Northern Ireland's Catholics, by early 1970 this had soured, and the Provisional IRA emerged, and embarked on what became a decades-long violent campaign during what became known as The Troubles.

==== In Place of Strife ====
In 1969, Callaghan, a strong defender of the Labour–trade union link, led the successful opposition in a divided cabinet to Barbara Castle's White Paper In Place of Strife which sought to modify trade union law. Amongst its numerous proposals were plans to force unions to call a ballot before a strike was held and the establishment of an Industrial Board to enforce settlements in industrial disputes. Callaghan caused a rift in the cabinet by leading the opposition to these proposals with trade union backing, and they were eventually dropped in favour of an agreement by the unions to curb unofficial strikes. Ten years later, Callaghan's actions in opposing trade union reform would come back to haunt him during the Winter of Discontent.

=== In opposition, 1970–1974 ===
Wilson's government went on to be unexpectedly defeated by Edward Heath at the 1970 general election.

Callaghan remained in Wilson's Shadow Cabinet initially becoming Shadow Home Secretary, later becoming Shadow Foreign Secretary. In 1973, after an approach from the Conservative Chancellor Anthony Barber he agreed to have his name go forward for the job of managing director of the International Monetary Fund (IMF), however, this was vetoed by the French government.

=== Foreign secretary, 1974–1976 ===
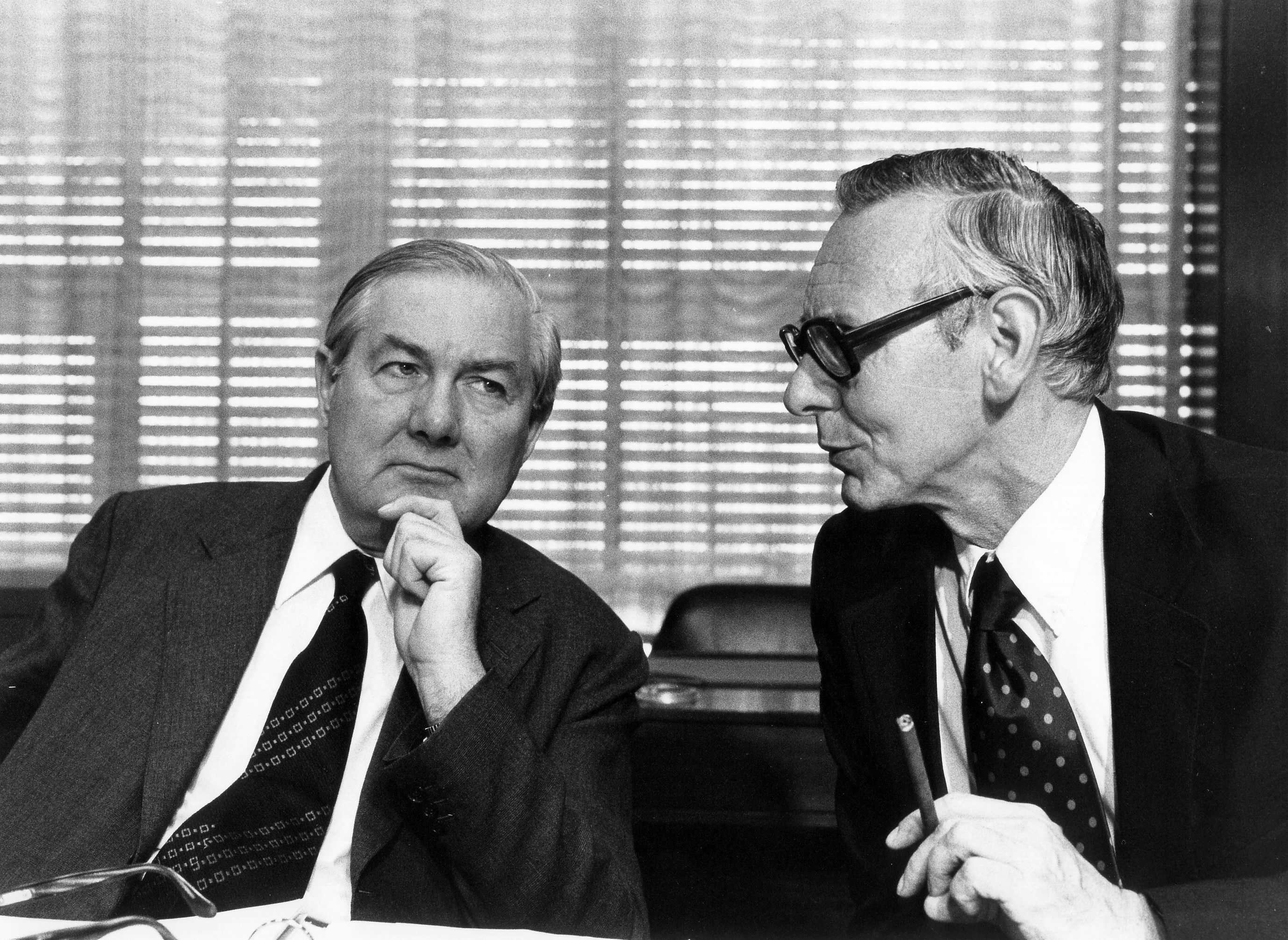
Callaghan and Dutch foreign minister Max van der Stoel in 1975

When Wilson won the next general election and returned as prime minister in March 1974, he appointed Callaghan as Foreign Secretary.

==== 1974 Cyprus crisis ====
In July 1974 a crisis erupted in Cyprus, when there was a coup d'état on the island, sponsored by the Greek military junta, which installed the pro-Greek puppet leader Nikos Sampson as the President, who threatened to unify the island with Greece. Turkey responded by launching an invasion of the island to protect the island's Turkish community. Britain was involved in the dispute as a signatory of the 1960 Treaty of Guarantee. Britain sent troops alongside the UN to prevent further advancement of Turkish troops. Callaghan led diplomatic efforts to secure a ceasefire, and called on both sides to attend tripartite meetings on the crisis with Britain. On 22 July a ceasefire was called. The tripartite talks got underway, and on 16 August an agreement was reached to make the ceasefire permanent, with a buffer zone patrolled by the UN between the Greek and Turkish controlled parts of the island. As of 2025 the island remains partitioned.

==== 1975 European referendum ====
Labour had entered office with the policy of renegotiating the terms of the United Kingdom's membership of the European Communities (EC), and then holding a referendum on remaining in the EC on these new terms. Callaghan was put in charge of these negotiations. When the talks concluded, Callaghan led the Cabinet in declaring the new terms acceptable and he supported a successful "Yes" vote in the 1975 European Communities referendum. Callaghan had formerly been on the eurosceptic wing of the Labour Party, however, during the negotiations and referendum he converted to be a pro-European. He was awarded the Freedom of the City of Cardiff on 16 March 1975.

==== Denis Hills affair ====
In 1975, Callaghan flew out to Uganda in order to bring home the British lecturer Denis Hills, who had been sentenced to death by Uganda's dictator Idi Amin for writing a book critical of him. After an appeal for clemency by both the Queen and the prime minister, Amin agreed to release Hills on the condition that Callaghan appeared in person to take him back to the UK.

==== Falkland Islands ====
Also in 1975, Argentina made territorial claims on the Falkland Islands. In response, Callaghan sent HMS Endurance to the islands, in order to send a message to Argentina that Britain would defend them. Seven years later, in 1982, Callaghan criticised the government of Margaret Thatcher for its decision to withdraw Endurance from the islands; a decision which contributed to the Argentine invasion that year.

==== 1976 leadership election ====
Barely two years after beginning his second spell as prime minister, Wilson announced his resignation on 16 March 1976. Although this came as a surprise to most people, Callaghan had been tipped off by Wilson several days in advance. Callaghan was the favourite to win the subsequent leadership election; although he was the oldest candidate, at 64 years old, he was also the most experienced and least divisive, being seen as in the centre ground of the Labour Party. Popularity with all parts of the Labour movement saw him through the ballot of Labour MPs to win the leadership vote. On 5 April 1976, Callaghan became prime minister.

== Prime Minister of the United Kingdom, 1976–1979 ==
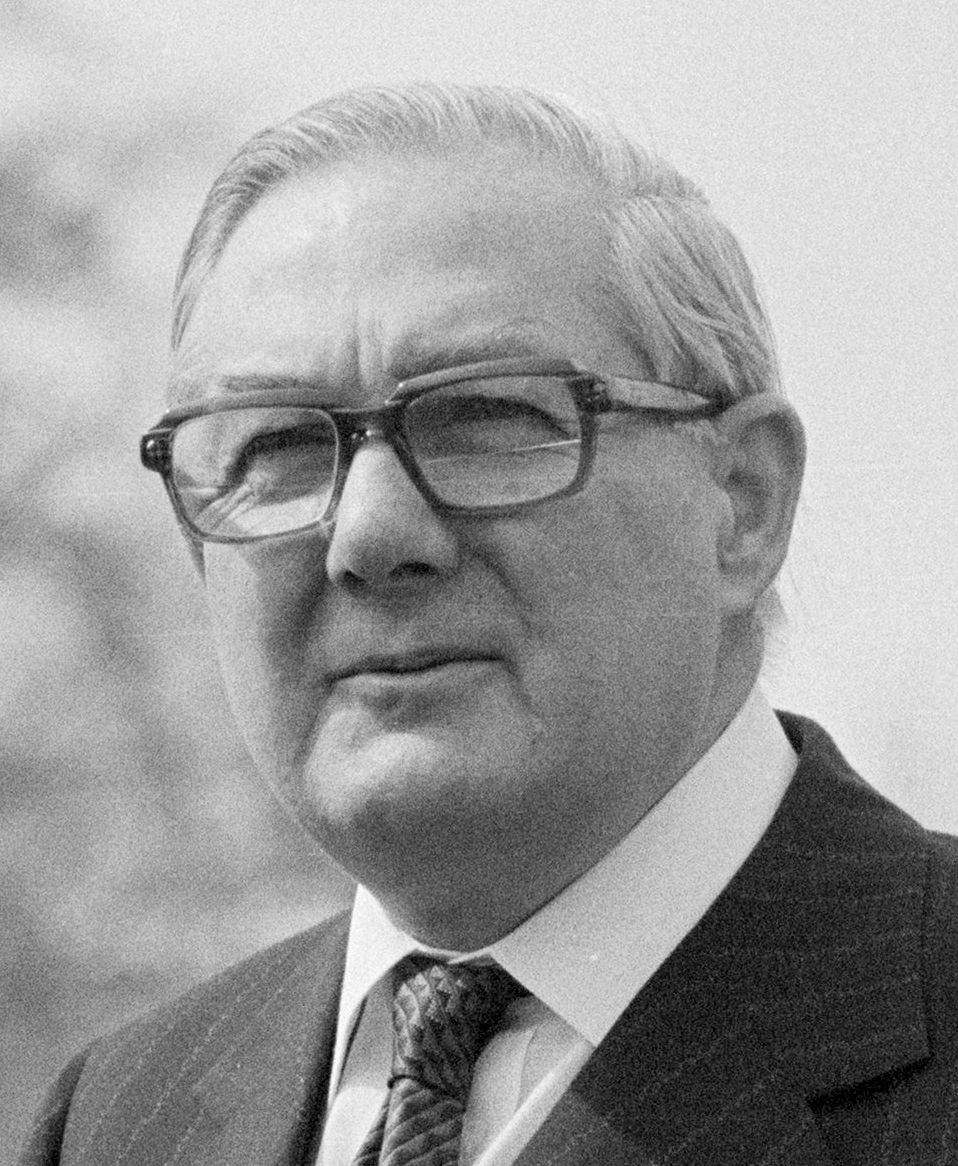
- Callaghan in 1977
- Premiership of James Callaghan; 5 April 1976 – 4 May 1979
- Monarch: Elizabeth II
- Cabinet: Callaghan ministry
- Party: Labour Party
- Seat: 10 Downing Street
- Coat of arms of HM Government

Callaghan was, and still is, the only prime minister to have held all three leading Cabinet positions – chancellor of the exchequer, home secretary and foreign secretary – prior to becoming prime minister.

On becoming prime minister, Callaghan immediately reshuffled the Cabinet: Anthony Crosland was given Callaghan's previous job as foreign secretary, while Merlyn Rees became home secretary, replacing Roy Jenkins whom Callaghan nominated to become president of the European Commission. Callaghan removed Barbara Castle, with whom he had a poor relationship, from the Cabinet, and gave her job at social security to David Ennals.

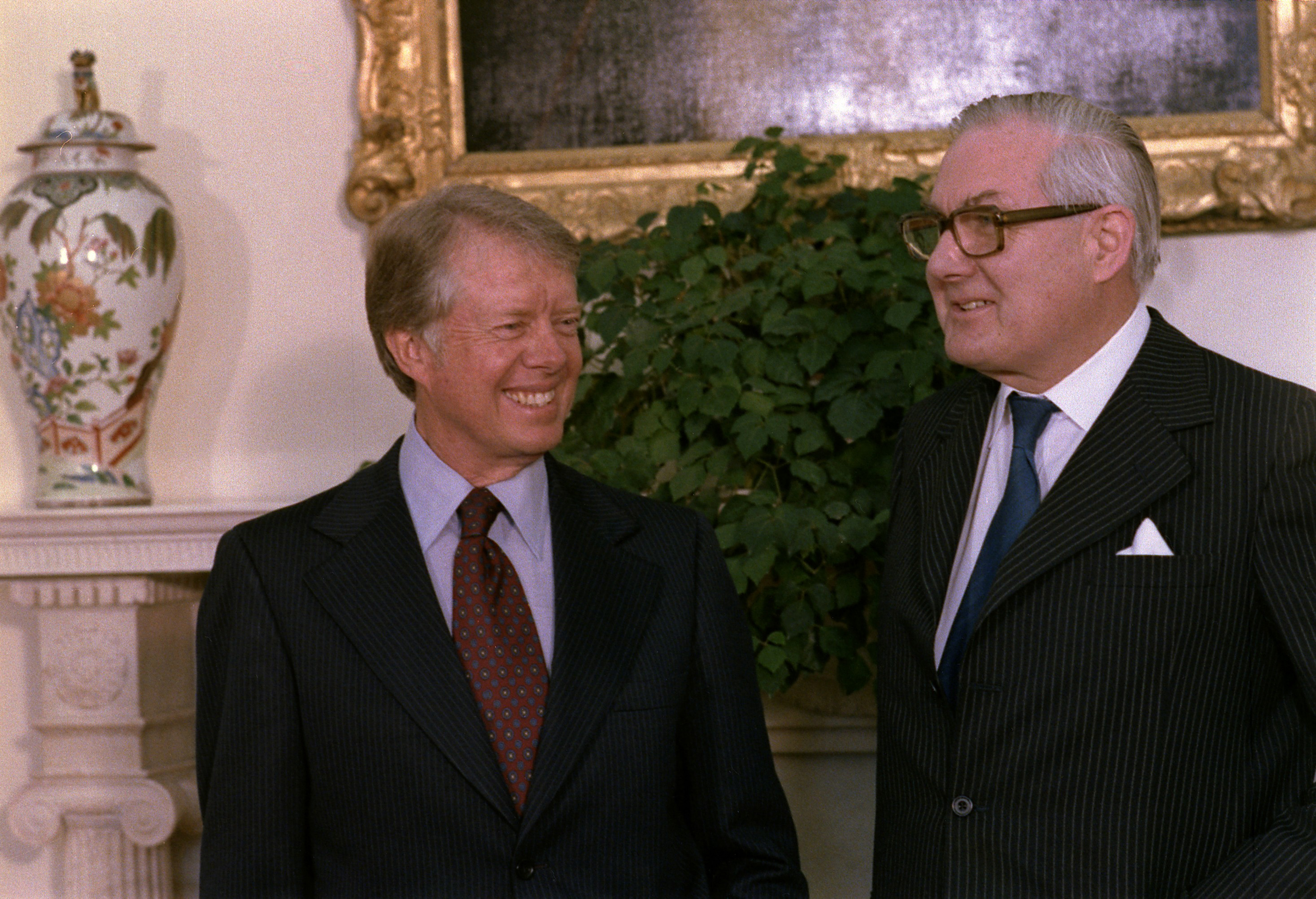
Callaghan (right) with US president Jimmy Carter in 1978

=== IMF loan ===
Callaghan came to office at a troubled time for the British economy, which was still recovering from the 1973–75 global recession, and was beset by double-digit inflation, low growth, and rising unemployment (i.e. stagflation). Within months of entering office, his government was faced with a sterling crisis, which caused the Chancellor Denis Healey to ask the International Monetary Fund (IMF) for a large loan of $3900 million (equivalent to $22.1 billion in 2025) to maintain the value of sterling. The IMF demanded large cuts in public spending in return for the loan, which caused consternation among Labour's supporters. The Cabinet was split on the issue, and the left of the party led by Tony Benn put forward an Alternative Economic Strategy as a proposed alternative to the loan, which involved protectionism, but this option was ultimately rejected by the Cabinet. After tough negotiations, the government was able to negotiate a reduction in the proposed public spending cuts from £5000 million (equivalent to £33.7 billion in 2025) to £1,500 million in the first year, and then £1000 million a year over the next two years. In the event the size of the loan was excessive, for it was based on an overestimation of the Public Sector Borrowing Requirement by the Treasury. The government needed to draw on only half of the loan, and it was paid back in full by May 1979. By 1978 the economic situation showed signs of improvement, with unemployment falling, and inflation falling to single digits. Healey was able to introduce an expansionary budget in April 1978.

Callaghan was widely judged to have handled the IMF crisis skilfully, avoiding any resignations from the Cabinet, and negotiating much lower spending cuts than had been originally demanded.

=== Minority government ===
Callaghan's time as prime minister was dominated by the troubles in running a government with a minority in the House of Commons. Labour had won a narrow majority of three seats at the October 1974 election, but by April 1976 its overall majority had disappeared, owing to by-election losses and the defection of two MPs to the breakaway Scottish Labour Party. Callaghan was left heading a minority government, forced to do deals with smaller parties in order to govern. An arrangement negotiated in March 1977 with Liberal Party leader David Steel, known as the Lib–Lab pact, lasted until June the following year. Deals were then forged with various small parties including the Scottish National Party (SNP) and the Welsh nationalist Plaid Cymru, prolonging the life of the government. The nationalist parties, in turn, demanded devolution to their respective constituent countries in return for their supporting the government. When referendums for Scottish and Welsh devolution were held in March 1979 the Welsh devolution referendum saw a large majority vote against, while the Scottish referendum returned a narrow majority in favour, but failed to reach the required threshold of 40% of the electorate in support. When the Labour government duly refused to push ahead with setting up the proposed Scottish Assembly, the SNP withdrew its support for the government: this finally brought the government down as the Conservatives triggered a vote of no confidence in Callaghan's government that was lost by a single vote on 28 March 1979, necessitating a general election.

=== Policies ===
==== Economic policies ====
Callaghan's time as prime minister saw broad continuation of the policies which Labour had adopted since it had been elected in 1974 under Wilson. Callaghan continued the policies of the "social contract" under which the trade unions agreed to a programme of voluntary wage restraint to control inflation, in return for various measures to control the cost of living, and increases in social expenditure. This policy was initially quite successful at controlling inflation, although the public spending cuts after 1976 left the government unable to deliver the increased social spending which had been promised as part of the package. Another policy continuation was the National Enterprise Board (NEB) which formed the centrepiece of the government's industrial policy. In practice, the NEB's main activity became one of rescuing failing companies.

At the 1976 Labour Party Conference, at the height of the stagflation crisis, Callaghan made the following statement in his speech:

"We used to think that you could spend your way out of a recession and increase employment by cutting taxes and boosting government spending. I tell you in all candour that that option no longer exists, and in so far as it ever did exist, it only worked on each occasion since the war by injecting a bigger dose of inflation into the economy, followed by a higher level of unemployment as the next step."

Given that the policy of every post-war government had prioritised the pursuit of full employment, this statement has been seen as a repudiation of Keynesian economics (which had formed the bedrock of the post-war consensus) and a precursor to monetarism, instead prioritising government action on the fight against inflation. However, Callaghan was never a full-blown monetarist, for he had rejected larger cuts in public expenditure which would have resulted in higher unemployment.

==== Other policies ====
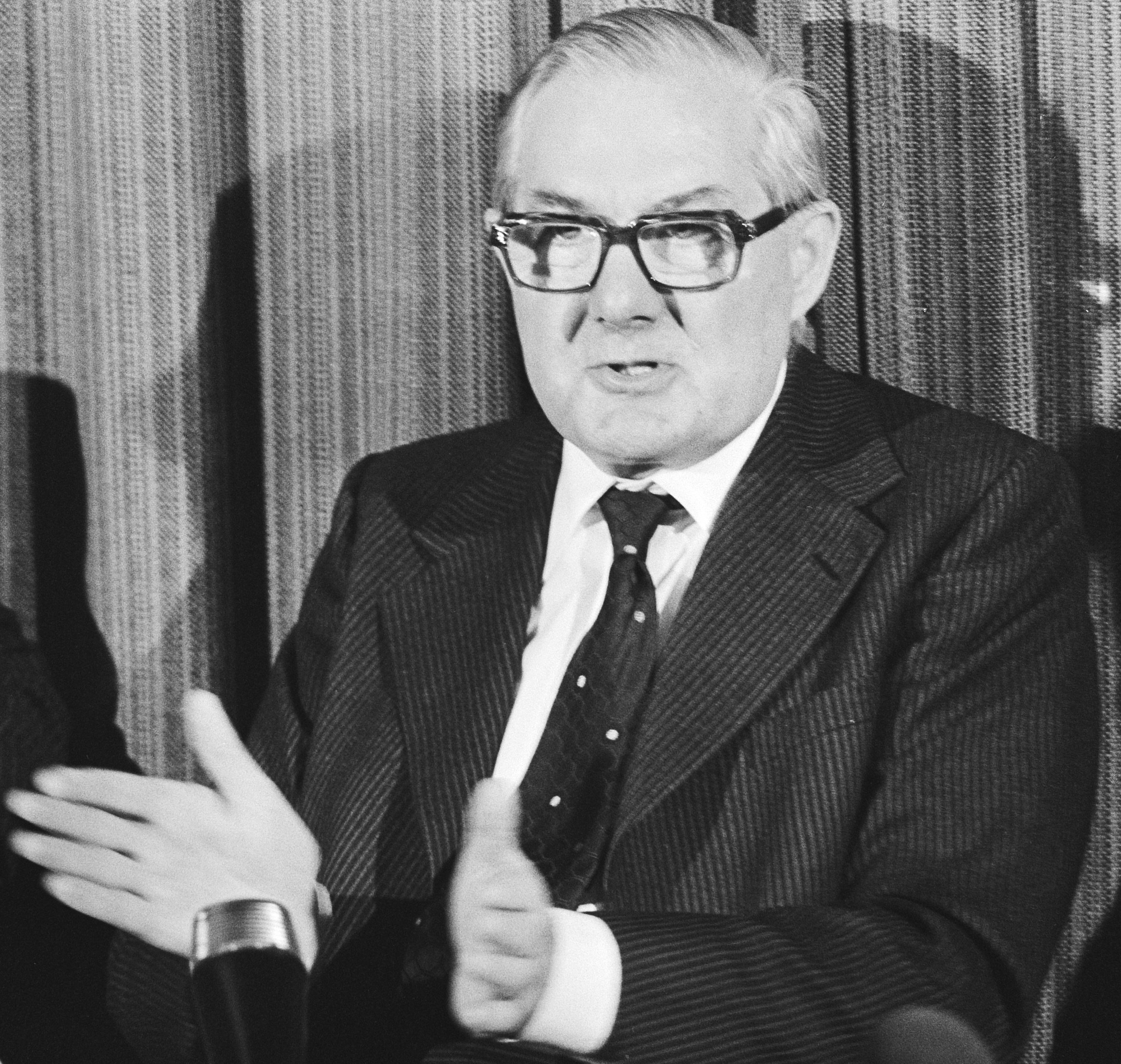
Callaghan visiting The Hague in 1976

Despite its lack of a parliamentary majority, Callaghan's government was able to carry out a number of reforms in many areas (see Labour government, 1974–1979#Major contributions). Callaghan relied heavily on Michael Foot, who was made Leader of the House of Commons and given the task of steering through the government's legislative programme. Among the measures introduced was the Race Relations Act 1976, which established the Commission for Racial Equality to promote racial equality; increases in pension and benefit rates; the creation of the Police Complaints Board; the expansion of comprehensive education; the Housing (Homeless Persons) Act 1977, which placed upon local authorities a statutory responsibility to provide housing for the homeless; universal Child Benefit; the phasing out of pay beds in NHS hospitals; housing security for agricultural workers; grants to inner cities; and legislation to improve consumer safety.

In 1977, Callaghan's government passed the Aircraft and Shipbuilding Industries Act 1977, which nationalised the shipbuilding industry, creating British Shipbuilders, and the aircraft industry, creating British Aerospace.

In February 1977, an easing of the conditions under which unemployment benefit could be paid to people who were unemployed as a result of a trade dispute was carried out. As a result of this change (one that had been recommended by a Royal Commission on Trade Unions and Employers' Associations back in 1968) "only those participating in or directly interested in the trade dispute are disqualified from benefit", as noted by one study. In August 1977 a new rule was made (Statutory Instrument No 1037/1977, dated 18 June 1977) "under Section 23 of the Children and Young Persons Act 1969, restricting the circumstances in which a court may remand a person aged under 17 to a Prison Department establishment in England and Wales." In Scotland, the Community Service by Offenders Act 1978 introduced provisions whereby offenders might, under certain circumstances, be ordered by courts to undertake community work as an alternative to a prison sentence. This legislation brought Scotland into line with England and Wales, where similar provisions already applied. The Protection from Eviction Act 1977 "made it an offence unlawfully to evict (or to attempt to do so) any resident occupant, or to enforce the right to repossession other than through the courts. It laid down restrictions on the validity of notices to quit." The Rent Act 1977, which applied to England and Wales, "laid down the means of fixing rents for controlled or regulated tenancies, and also for tenancies of housing associations or housing trusts."

The Home Purchase Assistance and Housing Corporation Guarantee Act 1978 gave help to first-time home buyers, while the 1978 Finance Act introduced profit-sharing schemes. On 3 April 1979, the number of hours that lone parents had to work to qualify for Family Income Supplement was reduced from 30 to 24 per week.

During his first year in office, Callaghan began what has since become known as 'The Great Debate' when he spoke at Ruskin College, Oxford, about the "legitimate concerns" of the public about the quality of education in the nation's maintained schools. This discussion led to greater involvement of the government, through its ministries, in the curriculum and administration of state education, leading to the eventual introduction of the national curriculum some ten years later. In 1977 he caused controversy with the appointment of Peter Jay, his then son-in-law, as the British Ambassador to the United States.

=== Proposed 1978 election ===
Over the summer of 1978, most opinion polls showed Labour with a lead of up to five points, and the expectation grew that Callaghan would call an autumn snap election, which would have given him a second term in office until autumn 1983. The economy had started to improve by this time: 1978 was a year of economic recovery for Britain, with inflation falling to single digits, unemployment declining during the year from a peak of 1.5 million in the third quarter of 1977, to 1.3 million a year later, and general living standards going up by more than 8%. Famously, he strung along the opposition and was expected to make his declaration of an election in a broadcast on 7 September 1978. Instead he announced that the election would be delayed until the following year, which was met with almost universal surprise. His decision not to call an election was seen by many as a sign of his dominance of the political scene and he ridiculed his opponents by singing old-time music hall star Vesta Victoria's song "Waiting at the Church" at that month's Trades Union Congress meeting. This was celebrated by the TUC but has since been interpreted as a moment of hubris. Callaghan intended to convey the message that he had not promised an election.

Callaghan's failure to call an election during 1978 was later widely seen as a political miscalculation; indeed, he himself later admitted that not calling an election was an error of judgement. However, private polling by the Labour Party in the autumn of 1978 had shown the two main parties with about the same level of support.

=== Winter of Discontent ===
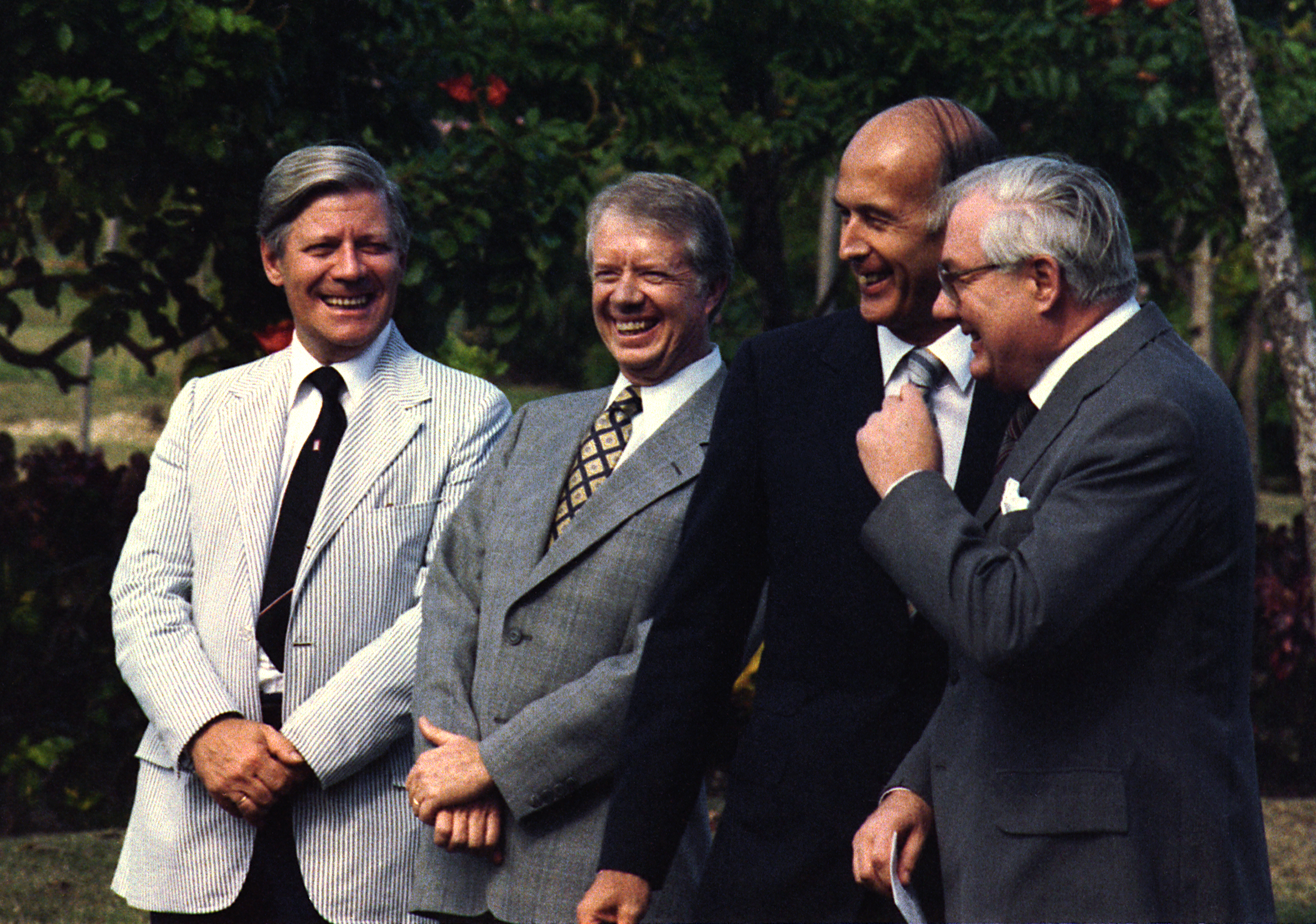
Callaghan (right) with Helmut Schmidt, Jimmy Carter and Valéry Giscard d'Estaing in Guadeloupe, 1979

The Labour government's method of dealing with the long-term economic difficulties involved wage restraint, which had been operating for four years with reasonable success. Callaghan gambled that another year of wage restraint would further improve the economy and allow him to be re-elected in 1979, and so he attempted to hold pay rises to 5% or less. The trade unions rejected continued wage restraint, and in a wave of widespread strikes over the winter of 1978–79 (known as the Winter of Discontent) secured higher pay. The industrial unrest made his government unpopular, and Callaghan's response to one interview question only made it worse. Returning to the United Kingdom from the Guadeloupe Conference in January 1979, Callaghan was asked, "What is your general approach, in view of the mounting chaos in the country at the moment?" Callaghan replied, "Well, that's a judgement that you are making. I promise you that if you look at it from outside, and perhaps you're taking rather a parochial view at the moment, I don't think that other people in the world would share the view that there is mounting chaos." This reply was reported in The Sun under the headline "Crisis? What Crisis?". Callaghan also later admitted in regard to the Winter of Discontent that he had "let the country down".

=== 1979 general election ===
The Winter of Discontent saw Labour's performance slump dramatically in the opinion polls. They had topped most of the pre-winter opinion polls by several points, but in February 1979 at least one opinion poll was showing the Conservatives 20 points ahead of Labour and it appeared inevitable that Labour would lose the forthcoming election.

In the buildup to the election, the Daily Mirror and The Guardian supported Labour, while The Sun, the Daily Mail, the Daily Express, and The Daily Telegraph supported the Conservatives.

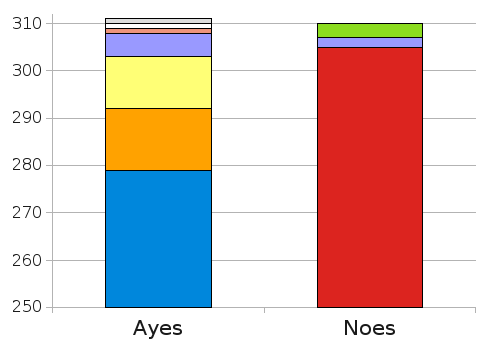
Votes by party in the 1979 vote of no confidence in the Callaghan ministry. The motion passed by one vote.

On 28 March 1979, the House of Commons passed a motion of no-confidence by one vote, 311–310, which forced Callaghan to call a general election which was held on 3 May. The Conservatives under Margaret Thatcher ran a campaign on the slogan "Labour Isn't Working". Although Callaghan remained personally more popular with the electorate than Thatcher, the Conservatives won the election with an overall majority of 43 seats. The Labour vote held up, with the party winning a similar number of votes to 1974, however the Conservatives benefited from a surge in turnout.

During the 1979 election campaign, Callaghan detected a sea-change in public opinion, on which he privately opined:

"You know there are times, perhaps once every thirty years, when there is a sea-change in politics. It then does not matter what you say or what you do. There is a shift in what the public wants and what it approves of. I suspect there is now such a sea change and it is for Mrs Thatcher."

After losing power in 1979, Labour spent the next 18 years in opposition; this is described by some commentators as some of the party's "wilderness years".

== Leader of the opposition, 1979–1980 ==
In the immediate aftermath of the election defeat, Callaghan wanted to resign as leader, but was persuaded to stay on in the hope that he would provide some stability, and ease the way for Denis Healey to be elected as his successor. During Callaghan's 17-month stint as opposition leader, the Labour Party was torn apart by factional struggles between the left and right of the party. In the event, the left succeeded in electing Michael Foot as his successor following the November 1980 leadership election, and he returned to the backbenches.

== Backbenches and retirement, 1980–2005 ==
In 1982, along with his friend Gerald Ford, he co-founded the annual AEI World Forum.

In 1983, he attacked Labour's plans to reduce defence, and the same year became Father of the House as the longest continually-serving member of the Commons.

In 1987, he was made a Knight Companion of the Garter and stood down at the 1987 general election after 42 years as an MP. He was one of the last remaining MPs elected in the Labour landslide of 1945. Shortly afterwards, he was elevated to the House of Lords on 5 November 1987 as a life peer with the title Baron Callaghan of Cardiff, of the City of Cardiff in the County of South Glamorgan. In 1987, his autobiography, Time and Chance, was published. He also served as a non-executive director of the Bank of Wales.

His wife Audrey, a former chairman (1969–82) of Great Ormond Street Hospital, spotted a letter to a newspaper which pointed out that the copyright of Peter Pan, which had been assigned by J. M. Barrie to the hospital, was going to expire at the end of that year, 1987 (50 years after Barrie's death, the then-current copyright term). In 1988, Callaghan moved an amendment to the Copyright Designs & Patents Act, then under consideration in the House of Lords, to grant the hospital a right to royalty in perpetuity despite the lapse of copyright, and it was passed by the government.

During the 1980s, Lord Callaghan supported the work of the Jim Conway Memorial Foundation (JCF), a registered educational charity. He gave the foundation's inaugural memorial lecture in 1981 and took the chair for a JCF symposium in 1990, being the final event of that ten-year lecture series.

Tony Benn recorded in his diary entry of 3 April 1997 that during the 1997 general election campaign, Callaghan was telephoned by a volunteer at Labour headquarters asking him if he would be willing to become more active in the party. According to Benn:

One young woman in her mid-twenties rang up Jim Callaghan and said to him on the phone, "Have you ever thought of being a bit more active in politics?" So Callaghan said, "Well I was a Labour Prime Minister – what more could I do?"

During an interview broadcast on the BBC Radio 4 programme The Human Button, Callaghan became the only prime minister to go on record with his opinion on ordering a retaliation in the event of a nuclear attack on the United Kingdom:

"If it were to become necessary or vital, it would have meant the deterrent had failed, because the value of the nuclear weapon is frankly only as a deterrent", he said. "But if we had got to that point, where it was, I felt, necessary to do it, then I would have done it. I've had terrible doubts, of course, about this. I say to you, if I had lived after having pressed that button, I could never, ever have forgiven myself."

In October 1999, Callaghan told The Oldie Magazine that he would not be surprised to be considered as Britain's worst prime minister in 200 years. He also said in this interview that he "must carry the can" for the Winter of Discontent. He stated:

I think we are all re-evaluated as time goes by and I should not be the slightest bit surprised if there is another evaluation after I die and people come to the conclusion that I was the worst prime minister since Walpole.

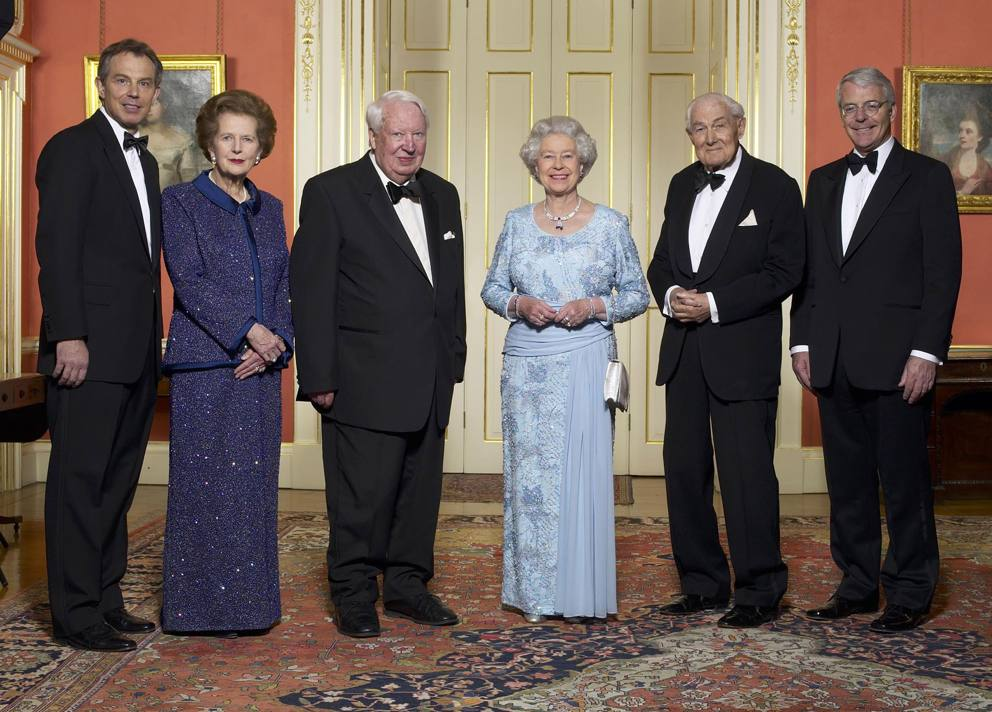
Callaghan (second from right) in 2002 with Queen Elizabeth II, Tony Blair (left) and three other former Prime Ministers; Margaret Thatcher, Edward Heath and John Major.

One of his final public appearances came on 29 April 2002, when shortly after his 90th birthday, he sat alongside the then-Prime Minister Tony Blair and three other surviving former prime ministers at the time – Edward Heath, Margaret Thatcher and John Major at Buckingham Palace for a dinner which formed part of the celebrations for the Golden Jubilee of Elizabeth II, alongside his daughter Margaret, Baroness Jay, who had served as leader of the House of Lords from 1998 until 2001.

== Personal life ==
Callaghan's interests included rugby (he played lock for Streatham RFC before the Second World War), tennis and agriculture. He married Audrey Elizabeth Moulton, whom he had met when they both worked as Sunday School teachers at the local Baptist church, in July 1938 and had three children – one son and two daughters.

- Margaret, Baroness Jay of Paddington, who married first Peter Jay and later Professor Mike Adler;
- Julia, who married Ian Hamilton Hubbard and settled in Lancashire;
- Michael, who married Jennifer Morris and settled in Essex.

In 1968, Callaghan purchased a farm in Ringmer, East Sussex, and in his retirement he and his wife commenced full time farming there.

Although there is much doubt about how much belief Callaghan retained into adult life, the Baptist nonconformist ethic was a profound influence throughout all of his public and private life. It has been claimed that Callaghan was an atheist, who lost his belief in God while he was working as a trade union official. His son Michael Callaghan disagrees: "My father, Jim Callaghan, was brought up as a practising Baptist and as a young man was a Sunday school teacher. As a young man embracing socialism, he had difficulties reconciling his new beliefs with the teachings of his church, but he was persuaded to stay in his Baptist chapel. [...] Incidentally, the title of his autobiography is 'Time and Chance', a quote from Ecclesiastes 9:11."

== Death ==
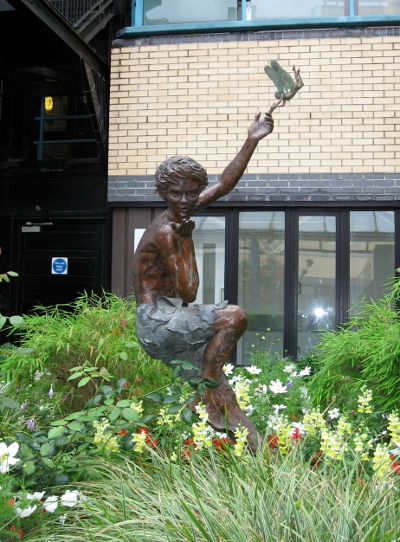
Callaghan's ashes were scattered in the flowerbed around the Peter Pan statue (pictured in 2008) at London's Great Ormond Street Hospital.

Callaghan died from lobar pneumonia, cardiac failure and kidney failure, on 26 March 2005. His death came one day before what would have been his 93rd birthday and 11 days after that of his wife of 67 years, who had spent her final four years in a nursing home due to Alzheimer's disease. Following her death, Callaghan moved into her former room at the nursing home in Burgess Hill, Sussex, where he spent his last days. He died as Britain's longest-lived former prime minister, having surpassed Harold Macmillan's record 39 days earlier and four months before the death of former prime minister Edward Heath.

Callaghan was cremated, and his ashes were scattered in a flowerbed around the base of the Peter Pan statue near the entrance to London's Great Ormond Street Hospital, where his wife had previously served as chair of the board of governors.

His Order of the Garter Banner was transferred from St George's Chapel, Windsor Castle, to Llandaff Cathedral in Cardiff after his death.

== Historiography ==
His contribution and legacy are still contested. The left wing of the Labour Party considers him a traitor whose betrayals of true socialism laid the foundations for Thatcherism. They point to his decision in 1976 to allow the IMF to control the government budget. They accuse him of abandoning the traditional Labour commitment to full employment. They blame his rigorous pursuit of a policy of controlling income growth for the Winter of Discontent. Writers on the right of the Labour Party complained that he was a weak leader who was unable to stand up to the left. New Labour writers who admire Tony Blair identify Callaghan with the old-style partisanship that was a dead end, and which a new generation of modernisers had to repudiate.

Practically all commentators agree that Callaghan made a serious mistake by not calling an election in the autumn of 1978. Bernard Donoughue, a senior official in his government, depicts Callaghan as a strong and efficient administrator who stood heads above his predecessor Harold Wilson. The standard scholarly biography by Kenneth O. Morgan is generally favourable – at least for the middle of his premiership – while admitting failures at the beginning, at the end, and in his leadership role following Margaret Thatcher's victory. The treatment found in most textbooks and surveys of the period remains largely negative.

Historians Alan Sked and Chris Cook have summarised the general consensus of historians regarding Labour in power in the 1970s:

If Wilson's record as prime minister was soon felt to have been one of failure, that sense of failure was powerfully reinforced by Callaghan's term as premier. Labour, it seemed, was incapable of positive achievements. It was unable to control inflation, unable to control the unions, unable to solve the Irish problem, unable to solve the Rhodesian question, unable to secure its proposals for Welsh and Scottish devolution, unable to reach a popular modus vivendi with the Common Market, unable even to maintain itself in power until it could go to the country at the date of its own choosing. It was little wonder, therefore, that Mrs Thatcher resoundingly defeated it in 1979.

== Arms ==
Coat of arms of James Callaghan, Baron Callaghan of Cardiff
Crest A sea-dragon sejant gules, langued and scaled or, its tail of the last scaled gules, the dorsal fin also gules, about the neck a mural crown or, masoned gules, and supporting to the front with the fin of the dexter foreleg a portcullis gold. Escutcheon Quarterly vert and azure in the former a portcullis or in the latter a lymphad with an anchor at its prow and masted or the sail set argent and pennants flying gules overall a fess or to the sinister thereof a grassy mount with a hurst of oak trees and issuing therefrom passant to the dexter a wolf proper. Motto Malo laborare quam languere (I had rather labour than be idle). Orders The Most Noble Order of the Garter. Symbolism The portcullis on green represents his parliamentary career. The colour green also refers his farming interests. The wolf and oak trees are taken from the arms of the Irish Callaghan sept. The lymphad (ship) represents his naval service in the Second World War and his family's naval links. His family's naval links are further represented in the crest by the sea-dragon. It is also inspired by the Welsh dragon, which in turn refers to the port of Cardiff, which he represented in Parliament.

== See also ==
- 1976 sterling crisis
- Shadow Cabinet of James Callaghan

Parliament of the United Kingdom
Preceded by Arthur Evans	Member of Parliament for Cardiff South; 1945–1950	Constituency abolished
Constituency established	Member of Parliament for Cardiff South East; 1950–1983	Constituency abolished
Constituency established	Member of Parliament for Cardiff South and Penarth; 1983–1987	Succeeded by Alun Michael
Preceded by John Parker	Father of the House of Commons; 1983–1987	Succeeded by Bernard Braine
Political offices
Preceded by George Strauss	Parliamentary Secretary to the Ministry of Transport; 1947–1950	Succeeded by The Lord Lucas of Chilworth
Preceded by John Dugdale	Parliamentary Secretary to the Admiralty; 1950–1951	Succeeded by Allan Noble
Preceded by Harold Wilson	Shadow Chancellor of the Exchequer; 1961–1964	Succeeded by Reginald Maudling
Preceded by Reginald Maudling	Chancellor of the Exchequer; 1964–1967	Succeeded by Roy Jenkins
Preceded by Roy Jenkins	Home Secretary; 1967–1970	Succeeded by Reginald Maudling
Preceded by Quintin Hogg	Shadow Home Secretary; 1970–1971	Succeeded by Shirley Williams
Preceded by Barbara Castle	Shadow Secretary of State for Employment; 1971–1972	Succeeded by Denis Healey
Preceded by Denis Healey	Shadow Foreign Secretary; 1972–1974	Succeeded by Geoffrey Rippon
Preceded by Alec Douglas-Home	Foreign Secretary; 1974–1976	Succeeded by Tony Crosland
Preceded by Harold Wilson	Prime Minister of the United Kingdom; 1976–1979	Succeeded by Margaret Thatcher
Preceded by Harold Wilson	First Lord of the Treasury; 1976–1979	Succeeded by Margaret Thatcher
Preceded by Harold Wilson	Minister for the Civil Service; 1976–1979	Succeeded by Margaret Thatcher
Preceded by Margaret Thatcher	Leader of the Opposition; 1979–1980	Succeeded by Michael Foot
Party political offices
Preceded by Dai Davies	Treasurer of the Labour Party; 1967–1976	Succeeded by Norman Atkinson
Preceded by William Simpson	Chair of the Labour Party; 1973–1974	Succeeded by Fred Mulley
Preceded by Harold Wilson	Leader of the Labour Party; 1976–1980	Succeeded by Michael Foot
Diplomatic posts
Preceded by Gerald Ford	Chair of the Group of 7; 1977	Succeeded by Helmut Schmidt
Preceded by Joop den Uyl	President of the European Council; 1977	Succeeded by Jack Lynch
