= 1976 Labour Party leadership election =

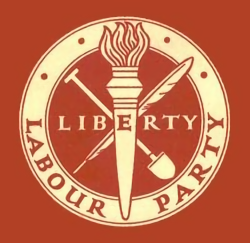
- 25 March – 5 April 1976
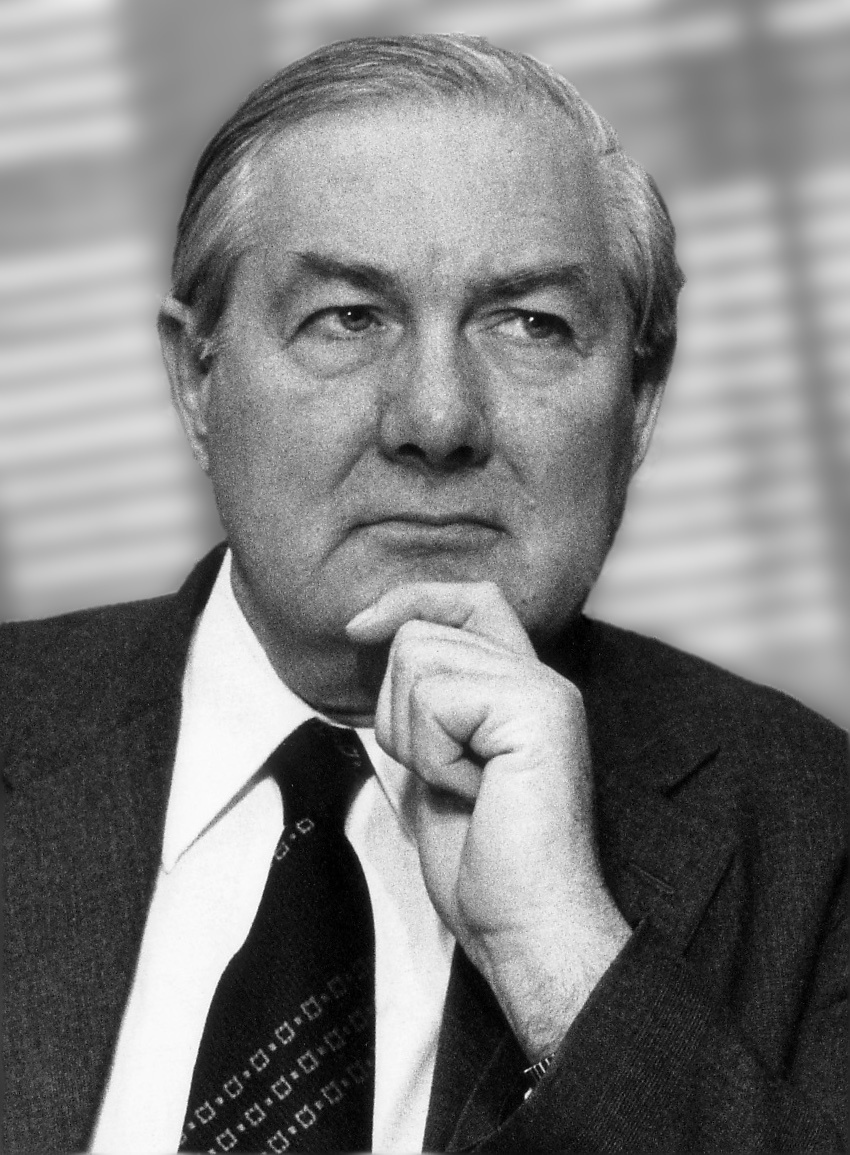

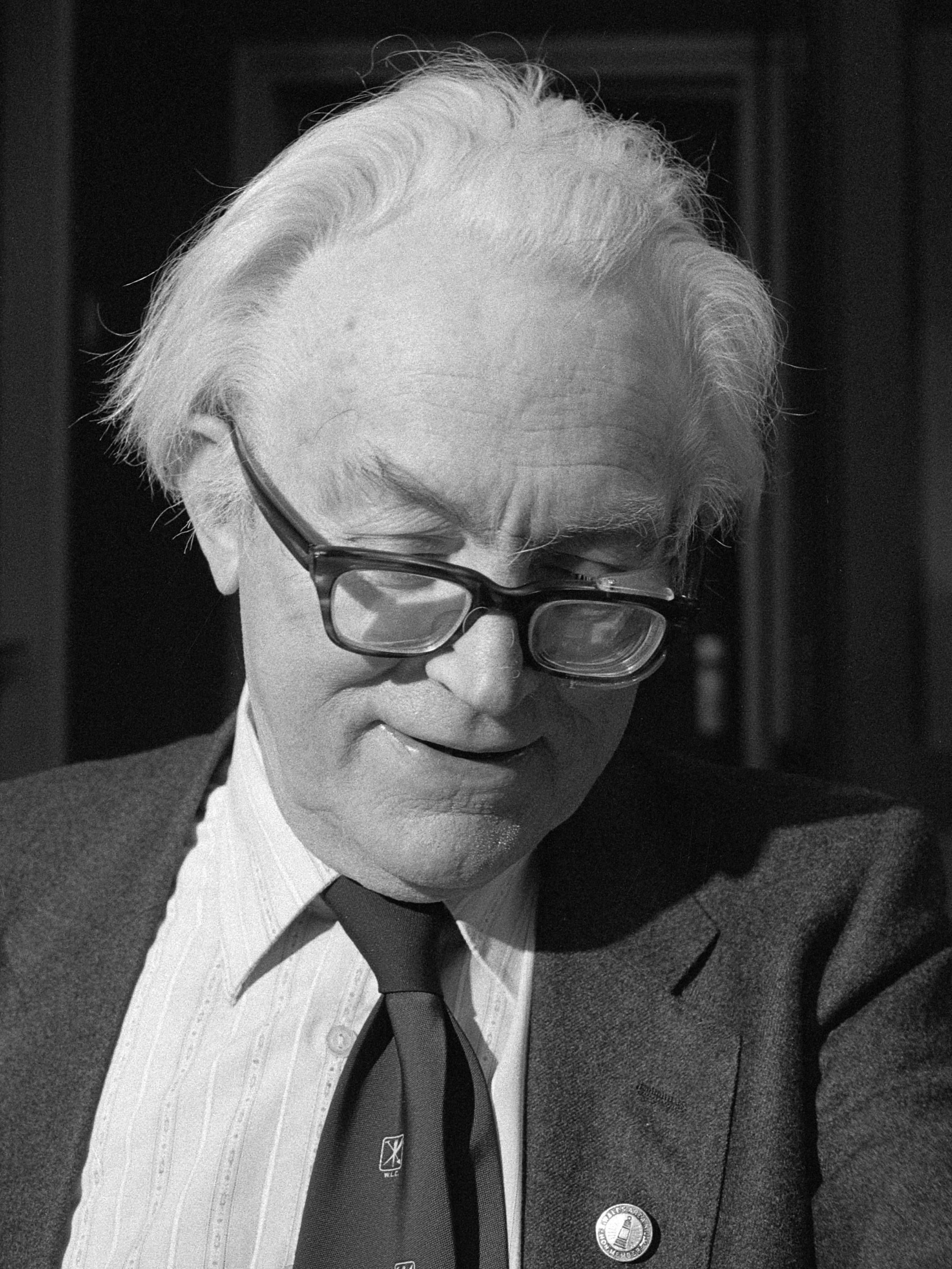

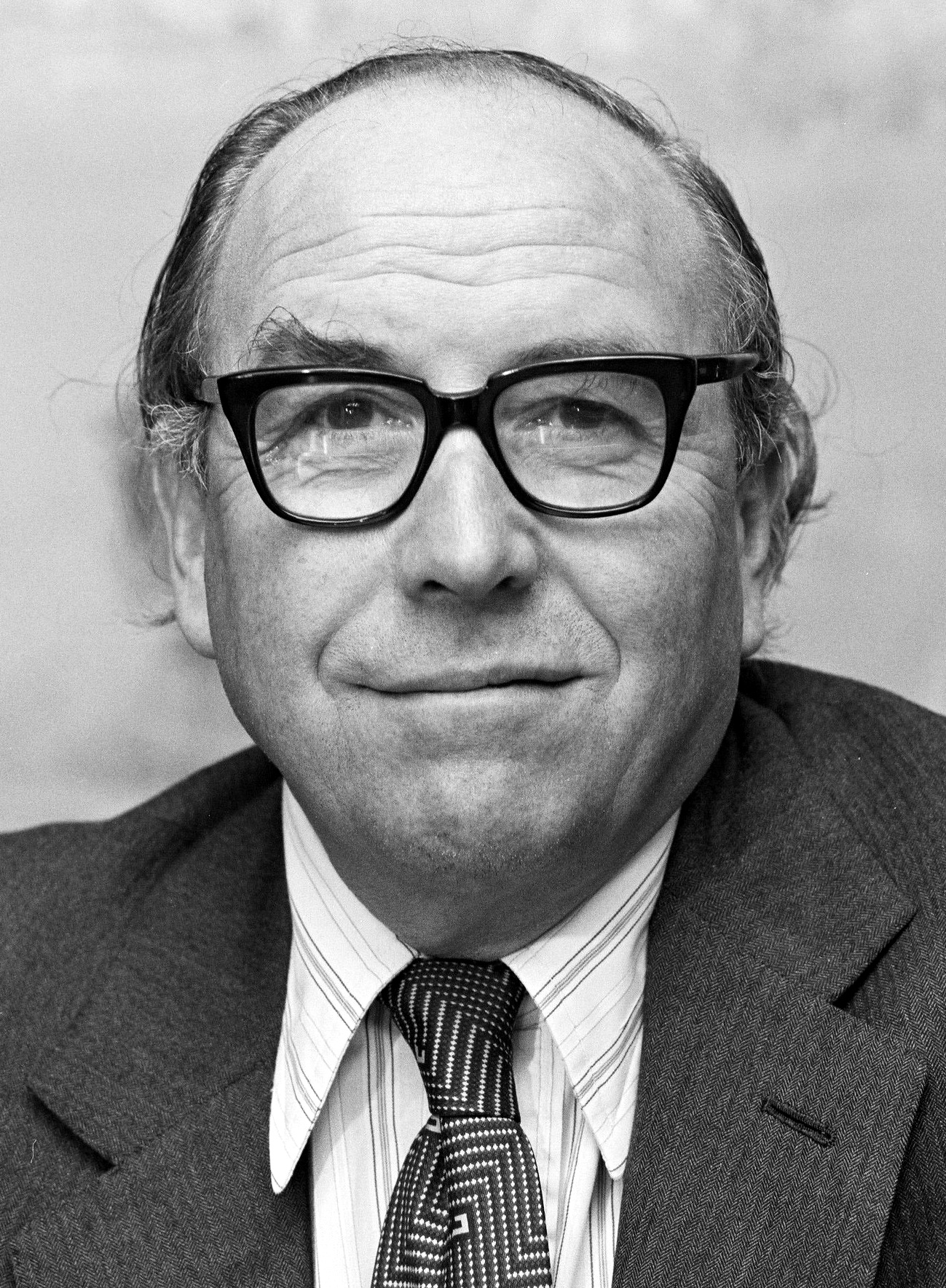

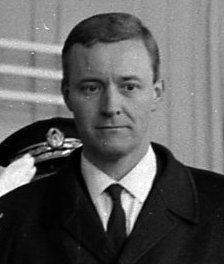

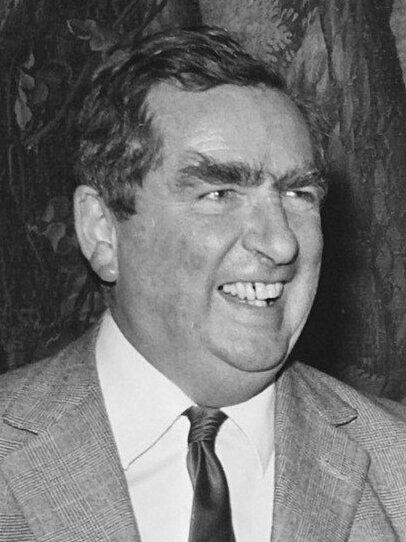

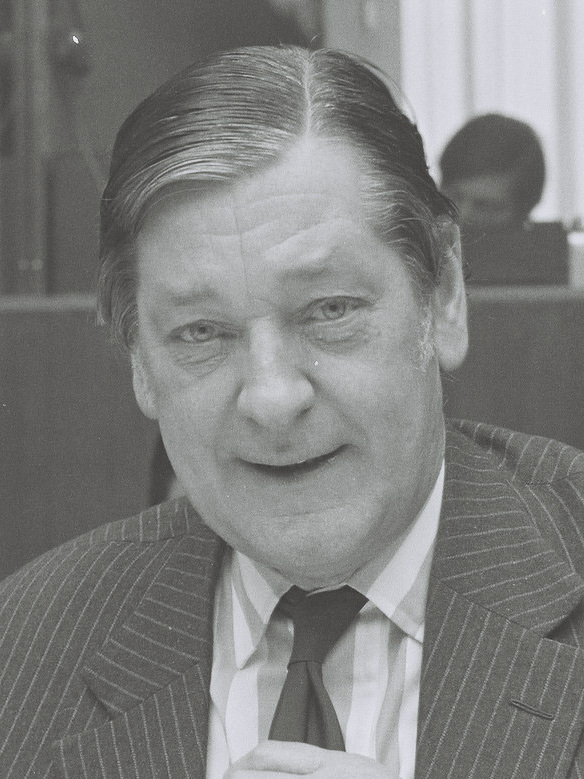
Candidate	James Callaghan	Michael Foot	Roy Jenkins
First ballot	84 (26.8%)	90 (28.7%)	56 (17.8%)
Final ballot	176 (56.2%)	137 (43.8%)	Withdrew
Candidate	Tony Benn	Denis Healey	Anthony Crosland
First ballot	37 (11.8%)	30 (9.6%)	17 (5.3%)
Final ballot	Withdrew	Eliminated	Eliminated
Leader before election
Harold Wilson
Elected Leader
James Callaghan

The 1976 Labour Party leadership election occurred when Harold Wilson resigned as Leader of the Labour Party and Prime Minister. It is the only occasion when the Labour Party, whilst in government, has had a leadership election with more than one candidate. It was also the first time a governing party had chosen a Prime Minister through exhaustive ballots while in office.

== Candidates ==
The new leader was elected by members of the Parliamentary Labour Party. In the first ballot, held on 25 March, six candidates vied for the leadership:

- Tony Benn, Secretary of State for Energy, Member of Parliament for Bristol South East
- James Callaghan, Foreign Secretary, Member of Parliament for Cardiff South East
- Anthony Crosland, Secretary of State for the Environment, Member of Parliament for Great Grimsby
- Michael Foot, Secretary of State for Employment, Member of Parliament for Ebbw Vale
- Denis Healey, Chancellor of the Exchequer, Member of Parliament for Leeds East
- Roy Jenkins, Home Secretary, Member of Parliament for Birmingham Stechford

In the wake of the news of Wilson's decision to resign, Callaghan was reported as being the favourite to succeed him. Political journalist Geoffrey Parkhouse wrote that "Barring a sensation, James Callaghan will be the next Prime Minister". He argued that the timing favoured Callaghan, with Denis Healey caught up in budget work and having alienated the left wing of the Labour Party after attacking the Tribune group in a recent speech. He doubted whether Crosland or Jenkins would stand, as they were likely to fare better under a Callaghan premiership than they had under Wilson.

== Result ==
First ballot: 25 March 1976
Candidate	Votes	%
Michael Foot	90	28.7
James Callaghan	84	26.8
Roy Jenkins	56	17.8
Tony Benn	37	11.8
Denis Healey	30	9.6
Anthony Crosland	17	5.3
Majority	6	1.9
Turnout	314	100
Second ballot required

As a result of the first ballot, Crosland was eliminated, while Jenkins and Benn withdrew from the contest. The remaining three candidates would face each other in a second ballot, five days later. Benn recommended that his supporters vote for Michael Foot. It was reported in The Glasgow Herald that Jenkins had withdrawn, despite finishing third, as he had concluded he could not improve on his 56 votes. Indeed, that result was a disappointment to him, as he had expected to receive at least 68 votes. Most of his advisors agreed with his decision to withdraw, though one, Dickson Mabon, attempted to convince him to stay in the contest. In contrast, Denis Healey, despite finishing behind both Jenkins and Benn, reckoned he could pick up votes from many parts of the party. The Herald also characterised the second round of the contest as being to determine who would face Foot in the final ballot, and believed Healey had a chance of pulling ahead of Callaghan.

Second ballot: 30 March 1976
Candidate	Votes	%
James Callaghan	141	45.2
Michael Foot	133	42.6
Denis Healey	38	12.2
Majority	8	2.6
Turnout	312	99.4
Third ballot required

No candidate achieved an absolute majority; hence, the candidate with the lowest number of votes was eliminated (in this case Healey). Callaghan was reported to be the favourite with his supporters, believing that it was impossible that the left-wing Foot could win the votes of more than half of those who had previously supported the right-wing Healey. However, Foot supporter John Silkin believed that 26 Healey voters would back Foot, more than enough for him to emerge victorious.

A final run-off ballot was held six days later.

Third ballot: 5 April 1976
Candidate	Votes	%
James Callaghan	176	56.2
Michael Foot	137	43.8
Majority	39	12.4
Turnout	313	99.7
James Callaghan elected

== Aftermath ==
Following his victory over Michael Foot by 176 votes to 137 in the final ballot, James Callaghan was immediately appointed prime minister and pledged to form a united government, warning Labour MPs against factionalism and declaring that there would be “no cliques” within the Parliamentary Labour Party. He confirmed that Denis Healey would remain chancellor of the exchequer, signalling continuity in economic policy and a renewed commitment to tackling inflation as the government’s central priority.

In his first television broadcast as prime minister, Callaghan warned that Britain faced “no soft option” and could not sustain its living standards through borrowing, emphasising that inflation must be reduced before unemployment could be effectively addressed. The leadership transition was widely described as orderly and democratic, with defeated candidates pledging loyalty. However, the government’s parliamentary position was weakened almost immediately by the death of Labour minister Brian O'Malley, which removed its overall Commons majority.
