= 1952 Leeds South East by-election =

UK Parliamentary by-election

The 1952 Leeds South East by-election was held on 7 February 1952. It was held due to the elevation to a hereditary peerage of the incumbent Labour MP, James Milner. It was retained by the Labour candidate, Denis Healey.

Leeds South East by-election, 1952
Party	Candidate	Votes	%	±%
Labour	Denis Healey	17,194	63.24	+2.74
Conservative	C E Kirwin	9,995	36.76	−2.74
Majority		7,199	26.48	+5.48
Turnout		27,189	55.7	−28.7
Labour hold		Swing		
