= Chandos Hoskyns =

Chandos Hoskyns may refer to:

- Chandos Wren-Hoskyns (1812–1876), English landowner, agriculturist, politician and author
- Chandos Hoskyns (British Army officer) (1895–1940), British Army soldier
