= Upcott =

Upcott may refer to:

== People ==
- Arthur William Upcott (1857–1922), Anglican priest and educationalist
- Edward Upcott (born 1991), British acrobatic gymnast
- Rosemary Firth (née Upcott) (1912–2001), British social anthropologist
- William Upcott (1779–1845), English librarian and antiquary

== Places ==
- Upcott, Cheriton Fitzpaine, an historic estate in Devon, England
