= 1979 Epping Forest District Council election =

Local election in Epping Forest

| ← 1976 | 3 May 1979 | 1980 → |

All 59 seats to Epping Forest District Council 30 seats needed for a majority

| | First party | Second party |
|---|---|---|
| Party | Conservative | Labour |
| Last election | 56 seats, 61.4% | 1 seat, 30.2% |
| Seats before | 56 | 1 |
| Seats after | 47 | 10 |
| Seat change | ▼9 | ▲9 |
| Popular vote | 24,295 | 16,171 |
| Percentage | 54.5% | 36.3% |
| Swing | ▼6.9% | ▲6.1% |
| | Third party | Fourth party |
| Party | Liberal | Independent |
| Last election | 0 seats, 6.8% | 2 seats, 1.4% |
| Seats before | 0 | 2 |
| Seats after | 0 | 2 |
| Seat change | Steady | Steady |
| Popular vote | 3,146 | 594 |
| Percentage | 7.0% | 1.3% |
| Swing | ▲0.2% | ▼0.1% |
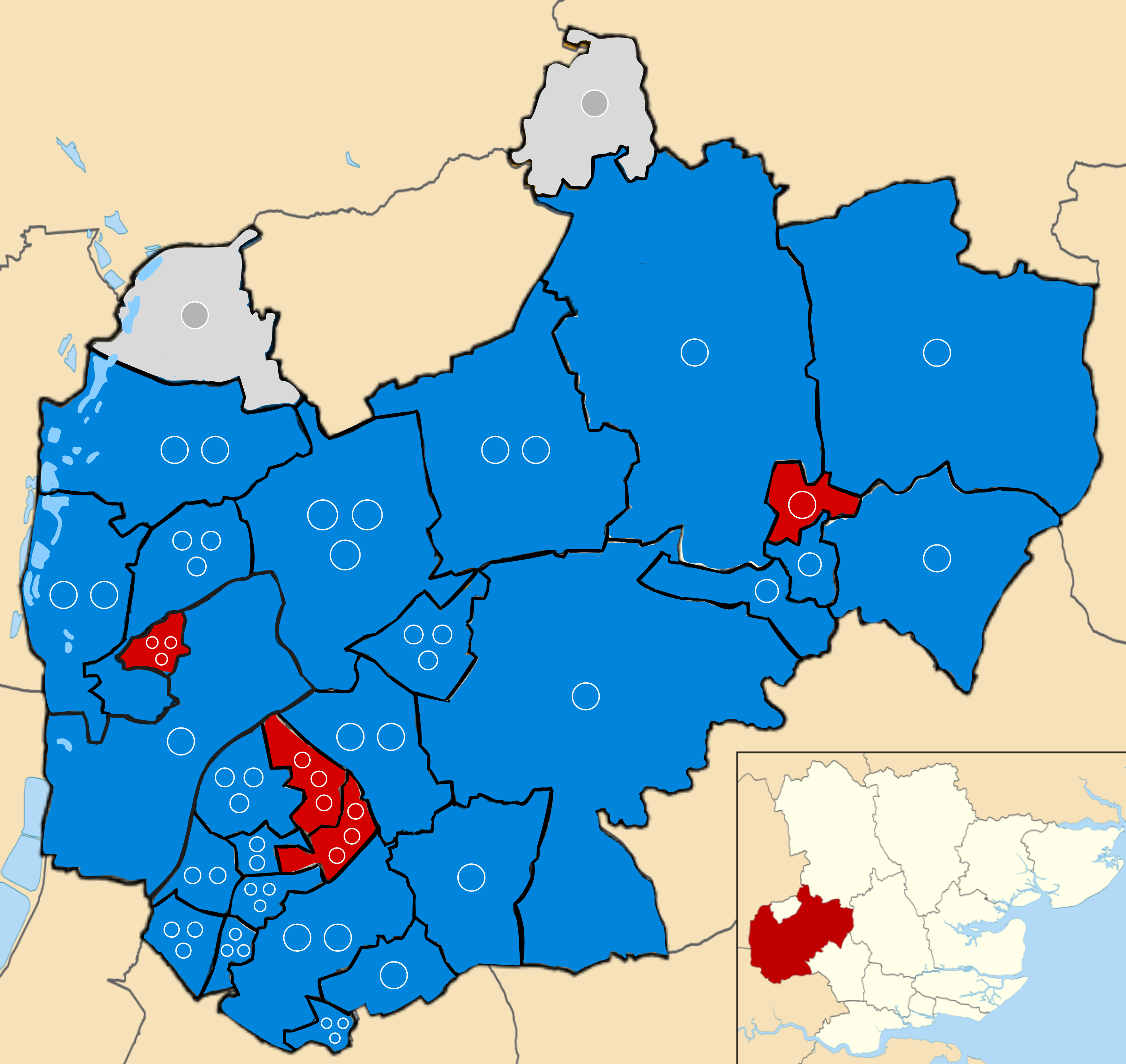
- Winner of each seat at the 1979 Epping Forest District Council election
Leader before election
Conservative
Leader after election
Conservative

The 1979 Epping Forest District Council election took place on 3 May 1979 to elect members of Epping Forest District Council in Essex, England. All 59 seats on the council were up for election following boundary changes, which created or altered several wards including Broadway, Buckhurst Hill East and West, Chigwell Row, Loughton St. Johns and Loughton St. Mary’s. This made the contest an all-out election, not the usual system where approximately one-third of councillors were elected each year, this would resume in 1980 onwards.

== Background ==
The election occurred on the same day as the 1979 United Kingdom general election, which saw the Conservatives under Margaret Thatcher defeat James Callaghan’s Labour government, ending five years of Labour rule. The local polls were also influenced by the wider political climate. In the months preceding the election, Britain experienced the “Winter of Discontent,” marked by widespread strikes among lorry drivers, public sector workers, and grave-diggers. Shortages of food, heating oil, and school closures added to the sense of crisis, culminating in the Callaghan government losing a vote of no confidence in March 1979. Opinion polls throughout early 1979 consistently showed a strong Conservative lead, which carried into both national and local contests.

In Epping Forest, the Conservative Party retained control of the council, consolidating their dominance in rural and suburban wards such as Buckhurst Hill, Chigwell, and North Weald Bassett. The Labour Party remained competitive in areas with stronger working-class representation, including Broadway, Debden Green, and Paternoster, where they returned multiple councillors.

Turnout in many wards was notably high, with several exceeding 75%, reflecting the heightened political interest generated by the simultaneous general election. For instance, Buckhurst Hill West recorded a turnout of 78.0%, while Lambourne reached 83.4%. Despite the Labour Party’s national struggles, they managed to hold local ground in certain wards, though the Conservatives’ overall majority on the council was secure.

== Summary ==
1979 Epping Forest District Council election
| Party | This election | | | Full council | | | This election | | |
| Party | Seats | Net | Seats % | Other | Total | Total % | Votes | Votes % | +/− |
|---|---|---|---|---|---|---|---|---|---|
| Conservative | 47 | ▼9 | 79.6 | | 47 | 79.6 | 24,295 | 54.5 | ▼6.9 |
| Labour | 10 | ▲9 | 16.9 | | 10 | 16.9 | 16,171 | 36.3 | ▲6.1 |
| Independent | 2 | Steady | 3.3 | | 2 | 3.3 | 594 | 1.3 | ▼0.1 |
| Liberal | 0 | Steady | 0.0 | | 0 | 0.0 | 3,146 | 7.0 | ▲0.2 |
| Ind. Conservative | 0 | Steady | 0.0 | | 0 | 0.0 | 327 | 1.0 | N/A |

== Results ==
=== Buckhurst Hill East ===
Buckhurst Hill East
| Party | Candidate | Votes | % | ±% |
|---|---|---|---|---|
| Conservative | C. Perry | 1,438 | 48.2 | N/A |
| Conservative | G. Smith | 1,336 | | N/A |
| Conservative | R. Garner | 1,326 | | N/A |
| Labour | B. Mooney | 874 | 29.4 | N/A |
| Labour | Ms L. Timson | 764 | | N/A |
| Liberal | G. Chapman | 670 | 22.5 | N/A |
| Liberal | A. Dickinson | 617 | | N/A |
| Liberal | S. Gearon-Simm | 486 | | N/A |
| Majority | | | 18.9 | N/A |
| Turnout | | 2,982 | 76.0 | N/A |
| Registered electors | | 3,923 | | |
| Conservative win (new seat) | | | | |
| Conservative win (new seat) | | | | |
| Conservative win (new seat) | | | | |

=== Buckhurst Hill West ===
Buckhurst Hill West
| Party | Candidate | Votes | % | ±% |
|---|---|---|---|---|
| Conservative | I. Beattie | 2,536 | 67.5 | N/A |
| Conservative | V. Milner | 2,338 | | N/A |
| Conservative | A. Welch | 1,594 | | N/A |
| Liberal | R. Eveling | 811 | 21.6 | N/A |
| Liberal | M. Clyne | 731 | | N/A |
| Liberal | J. West | 678 | | N/A |
| Labour | Ms F. Underhill | 412 | 11.0 | N/A |
| Labour | J. Blagden | 411 | | N/A |
| Majority | | | 45.9 | N/A |
| Turnout | | 3,759 | 78.0 | N/A |
| Registered electors | | 4,820 | | |
| Conservative win (new seat) | | | | |
| Conservative win (new seat) | | | | |
| Conservative win (new seat) | | | | |

=== Chigwell Row ===
Chigwell Row
| Party | Candidate | Votes | % | ±% |
|---|---|---|---|---|
| Conservative | R. McGregor | 940 | 71.4 | N/A |
| Labour | C. Periera | 376 | 28.6 | N/A |
| Majority | | 564 | 42.9 | N/A |
| Turnout | | 1,316 | 74.1 | N/A |
| Registered electors | | 1,775 | | |
| Conservative win (new seat) | | | | |

=== Chigwell Village ===
Chigwell Village
| Party | Candidate | Votes | % | ±% |
|---|---|---|---|---|
| Conservative | N. Risdon | N/A | N/A | N/A |
| Conservative | B. Gunby | N/A | N/A | N/A |
| Majority | | N/A | N/A | N/A |
| Turnout | | N/A | N/A | N/A |
| Registered electors | | 3,080 | | |
| Conservative win (new seat) | | | | |
| Conservative win (new seat) | | | | |

=== Chipping Ongar ===
Chipping Ongar
| Party | Candidate | Votes | % | ±% |
|---|---|---|---|---|
| Conservative | F. Love | 708 | 68.5 | N/A |
| Labour | K. Tait | 325 | 31.5 | N/A |
| Majority | | 383 | 37.1 | N/A |
| Turnout | | 1,033 | 80.9 | N/A |
| Registered electors | | 1,277 | | |
| Conservative win (new seat) | | | | |

=== Debden Green ===
Debden Green
| Party | Candidate | Votes | % | ±% |
|---|---|---|---|---|
| Labour | S. Palfreman | 1,595 | 62.3 | N/A |
| Labour | P. Bostock | 1,523 | | N/A |
| Labour | B. Whitlock | 1,465 | | N/A |
| Conservative | Ms S. Knight | 965 | 37.7 | N/A |
| Conservative | Ms J. Steele | 919 | | N/A |
| Conservative | J. Phillips | 850 | | N/A |
| Majority | | | 24.6 | N/A |
| Turnout | | 2,560 | 65.1 | N/A |
| Registered electors | | 3,931 | | |
| Labour win (new seat) | | | | |
| Labour win (new seat) | | | | |
| Labour win (new seat) | | | | |

=== Epping Hemnall ===
Epping Hemnall
| Party | Candidate | Votes | % | ±% |
|---|---|---|---|---|
| Conservative | M. Aldworth | N/A | N/A | N/A |
| Conservative | K. Rothwell | N/A | N/A | N/A |
| Conservative | R. Hill | N/A | N/A | N/A |
| Majority | | N/A | N/A | N/A |
| Turnout | | N/A | N/A | N/A |
| Registered electors | | 4,491 | | |
| Conservative win (new seat) | | | | |
| Conservative win (new seat) | | | | |
| Conservative win (new seat) | | | | |

=== Epping Lindsey ===
Epping Lindsey
| Party | Candidate | Votes | % | ±% |
|---|---|---|---|---|
| Conservative | H. Mead | N/A | N/A | N/A |
| Conservative | A. O'Brien | N/A | N/A | N/A |
| Conservative | F. Limer | N/A | N/A | N/A |
| Majority | | N/A | N/A | N/A |
| Turnout | | N/A | N/A | N/A |
| Registered electors | | 5,035 | | |
| Conservative win (new seat) | | | | |
| Conservative win (new seat) | | | | |
| Conservative win (new seat) | | | | |

=== Grange Hill ===
Grange Hill
| Party | Candidate | Votes | % | ±% |
|---|---|---|---|---|
| Conservative | C. Davie | N/A | N/A | N/A |
| Conservative | Ms M. Farnsworth | N/A | N/A | N/A |
| Conservative | A. Bryant | N/A | N/A | N/A |
| Majority | | N/A | N/A | N/A |
| Turnout | | N/A | N/A | N/A |
| Registered electors | | 4,409 | | |
| Conservative win (new seat) | | | | |
| Conservative win (new seat) | | | | |
| Conservative win (new seat) | | | | |

=== Greensted and Marden Ash ===
Greensted and Marden Ash
| Party | Candidate | Votes | % | ±% |
|---|---|---|---|---|
| Conservative | T. Sutherland | 949 | 66.9 | N/A |
| Labour | Ms F. Barnes | 469 | 33.1 | N/A |
| Majority | | 480 | 33.9 | N/A |
| Turnout | | 1,418 | 79.6 | N/A |
| Registered electors | | 1,781 | | |
| Conservative win (new seat) | | | | |

=== High Beech ===
High Beech
| Party | Candidate | Votes | % | ±% |
|---|---|---|---|---|
| Conservative | H. Taylor | 705 | 54.6 | N/A |
| Ind. Conservative | R. Knibb | 327 | 25.3 | N/A |
| Labour | Ms P. Sumner | 260 | 20.1 | N/A |
| Majority | | 378 | 29.3 | N/A |
| Turnout | | 1,292 | 72.8 | N/A |
| Registered electors | | 1,775 | | |
| Conservative win (new seat) | | | | |

=== High Ongar ===
High Ongar
| Party | Candidate | Votes | % | ±% |
|---|---|---|---|---|
| Conservative | D. Morton | 535 | 69.8 | N/A |
| Labour | J. Pratt | 231 | 30.2 | N/A |
| Majority | | 304 | 39.7 | N/A |
| Turnout | | 766 | 80.2 | N/A |
| Registered electors | | 955 | | |
| Conservative win (new seat) | | | | |

=== Lambourne ===
Lambourne
| Party | Candidate | Votes | % | ±% |
|---|---|---|---|---|
| Conservative | R. Amanet | 677 | 54.8 | N/A |
| Labour | C. Huckle | 558 | 45.2 | N/A |
| Majority | | 119 | 9.6 | N/A |
| Turnout | | 1,235 | 83.4 | N/A |
| Registered electors | | 1,481 | | |
| Conservative win (new seat) | | | | |

=== Loughton Broadway ===
Loughton Broadway
| Party | Candidate | Votes | % | ±% |
|---|---|---|---|---|
| Labour | Ms J. Davis | 1,894 | 60.6 | N/A |
| Labour | H. Worby | 1,786 | | N/A |
| Labour | M. Pettman | 1,663 | | N/A |
| Conservative | B. Sheppard | 1,230 | 39.4 | N/A |
| Conservative | A. Mitchell | 873 | | N/A |
| Conservative | F. Fernandez | 869 | | N/A |
| Majority | | | 21.3 | N/A |
| Turnout | | 3,124 | 69.5 | N/A |
| Registered electors | | 4,498 | | |
| Labour win (new seat) | | | | |
| Labour win (new seat) | | | | |
| Labour win (new seat) | | | | |

=== Loughton Forest ===
Loughton Forest
| Party | Candidate | Votes | % | ±% |
|---|---|---|---|---|
| Conservative | R. O'Malley | 1,508 | 65.4 | N/A |
| Conservative | D. James | 1,500 | | N/A |
| Liberal | G. Mathieson | 507 | 22.0 | N/A |
| Labour | Ms C. Beckett | 291 | 12.6 | N/A |
| Labour | Ms A. Fowl | 253 | | N/A |
| Majority | | | 43.4 | N/A |
| Turnout | | 2,306 | 78.6 | N/A |
| Registered electors | | 2,932 | | |
| Conservative win (new seat) | | | | |
| Conservative win (new seat) | | | | |

=== Loughton Roding ===
Loughton Roding
| Party | Candidate | Votes | % | ±% |
|---|---|---|---|---|
| Conservative | W. Jones | 1,600 | 52.3 | N/A |
| Conservative | Ms A. Miller | 1,542 | | N/A |
| Conservative | G. Beldom | 1,530 | | N/A |
| Labour | A. Hilton | 1,458 | 47.7 | N/A |
| Labour | W. Smith | 1,443 | | N/A |
| Labour | Ms M. Wilkinson | 1,362 | | N/A |
| Majority | | | 4.6 | N/A |
| Turnout | | 3,058 | 68.3 | N/A |
| Registered electors | | 4,480 | | |
| Conservative win (new seat) | | | | |
| Conservative win (new seat) | | | | |
| Conservative win (new seat) | | | | |

=== Loughton St. Johns ===
Loughton St. Johns
| Party | Candidate | Votes | % | ±% |
|---|---|---|---|---|
| Conservative | Ms R. Brady | 2,129 | 62.2 | N/A |
| Conservative | Ms D. Sanders | 1,905 | | N/A |
| Conservative | Ms E. Hammond | 1,896 | | N/A |
| Liberal | Ms S. Knight | 667 | 19.5 | N/A |
| Labour | M. Beckett | 627 | 18.3 | N/A |
| Labour | Ms G. Pettman | 571 | | N/A |
| Labour | A. Fowl | 562 | | N/A |
| Majority | | | 42.7 | N/A |
| Turnout | | 3,423 | 80.3 | N/A |
| Registered electors | | 4,263 | | |
| Conservative win (new seat) | | | | |
| Conservative win (new seat) | | | | |
| Conservative win (new seat) | | | | |

=== Loughton St. Marys ===
Loughton St. Marys
| Party | Candidate | Votes | % | ±% |
|---|---|---|---|---|
| Conservative | A. Swallow | 1,562 | 60.3 | N/A |
| Conservative | Ms L. Scott | 1,513 | | N/A |
| Labour | Ms D. Davies | 538 | 20.7 | N/A |
| Labour | P. Kelly | 518 | | N/A |
| Liberal | N. Macy | 491 | 19.0 | N/A |
| Majority | | | 39.5 | N/A |
| Turnout | | 2,591 | 78.9 | N/A |
| Registered electors | | 3,285 | | |
| Conservative win (new seat) | | | | |
| Conservative win (new seat) | | | | |
| Conservative win (new seat) | | | | |

=== Moreton and Matching ===
Moreton and Matching
| Party | Candidate | Votes | % | ±% |
|---|---|---|---|---|
| Conservative | P. Gould | N/A | N/A | N/A |
| Majority | | N/A | N/A | N/A |
| Turnout | | N/A | N/A | N/A |
| Registered electors | | 1,735 | | |
| Conservative win (new seat) | | | | |

=== Nazeing ===
Nazeing
| Party | Candidate | Votes | % | ±% |
|---|---|---|---|---|
| Conservative | M. Welch | N/A | N/A | N/A |
| Conservative | K. Judd | N/A | N/A | N/A |
| Majority | | N/A | N/A | N/A |
| Turnout | | N/A | N/A | N/A |
| Registered electors | | 3,627 | | |
| Conservative win (new seat) | | | | |
| Conservative win (new seat) | | | | |

=== North Weald Bassett ===
North Weald Bassett
| Party | Candidate | Votes | % | ±% |
|---|---|---|---|---|
| Conservative | I. Abbey | 1,763 | 64.9 | N/A |
| Conservative | B. Greenhill | 1,625 | | N/A |
| Labour | B. King | 955 | 35.1 | N/A |
| Labour | A. Vickery | 839 | | N/A |
| Majority | | | 29.7 | N/A |
| Turnout | | 2,718 | 72.7 | N/A |
| Registered electors | | 3,739 | | |
| Conservative win (new seat) | | | | |
| Conservative win (new seat) | | | | |

=== Passingford ===
Passingford
| Party | Candidate | Votes | % | ±% |
|---|---|---|---|---|
| Conservative | J. Pledge | N/A | N/A | N/A |
| Majority | | N/A | N/A | N/A |
| Turnout | | N/A | N/A | N/A |
| Registered electors | | 1,514 | | |
| Conservative win (new seat) | | | | |

=== Roothing Country ===
Roothing Country
| Party | Candidate | Votes | % | ±% |
|---|---|---|---|---|
| Conservative | T. East | N/A | N/A | N/A |
| Majority | | N/A | N/A | N/A |
| Turnout | | N/A | N/A | N/A |
| Registered electors | | 1,206 | | |
| Conservative win (new seat) | | | | |

=== Roydon ===
Roydon
| Party | Candidate | Votes | % | ±% |
|---|---|---|---|---|
| Independent | A. Vare | N/A | N/A | N/A |
| Majority | | N/A | N/A | N/A |
| Turnout | | N/A | N/A | N/A |
| Registered electors | | 1,889 | | |
| Independent win (new seat) | | | | |

=== Sheering ===
Sheering
| Party | Candidate | Votes | % | ±% |
|---|---|---|---|---|
| Independent | S. Langton | 594 | 51.2 | N/A |
| Labour | A. Roberts | 567 | 48.8 | N/A |
| Majority | | 27 | 2.3 | N/A |
| Turnout | | 1,161 | 80.3 | N/A |
| Registered electors | | 1,446 | | |
| Independent win (new seat) | | | | |

=== Shelley ===
Shelley
| Party | Candidate | Votes | % | ±% |
|---|---|---|---|---|
| Labour | R. Barnes | 648 | 61.0 | N/A |
| Conservative | Ms E. Irving | 415 | 39.9 | N/A |
| Majority | | 233 | 21.9 | N/A |
| Turnout | | 1,063 | 77.2 | N/A |
| Registered electors | | 1,377 | | |
| Labour win (new seat) | | | | |

=== Theydon Bois ===
Theydon Bois
| Party | Candidate | Votes | % | ±% |
|---|---|---|---|---|
| Conservative | W. Axon | N/A | N/A | N/A |
| Conservative | Ms J. Wainwright | N/A | N/A | N/A |
| Majority | | N/A | N/A | N/A |
| Turnout | | N/A | N/A | N/A |
| Registered electors | | 3,284 | | |
| Conservative win (new seat) | | | | |
| Conservative win (new seat) | | | | |

=== Waltham Abbey East ===
Waltham Abbey East
| Party | Candidate | Votes | % | ±% |
|---|---|---|---|---|
| Conservative | A. Brock | 1,799 | 53.7 | N/A |
| Conservative | D. Esau | 1,743 | | N/A |
| Conservative | G. O'Reilly | 1,689 | | N/A |
| Labour | Ms J. Hewins | 1,554 | 46.3 | N/A |
| Labour | C. Sumner | 1,521 | | N/A |
| Labour | P. Pennell | 1,488 | | N/A |
| Majority | | | 7.3 | N/A |
| Turnout | | 3,353 | 69.1 | N/A |
| Registered electors | | 4,852 | | |
| Conservative win (new seat) | | | | |
| Conservative win (new seat) | | | | |
| Conservative win (new seat) | | | | |

=== Waltham Abbey Paternoster ===
Waltham Abbey Paternoster
| Party | Candidate | Votes | % | ±% |
|---|---|---|---|---|
| Labour | C. Hewins | 1,438 | 57.7 | N/A |
| Labour | S. Riley | 1,355 | | N/A |
| Labour | J. Popely | 1,236 | | N/A |
| Conservative | F. Bye | 1,056 | 42.3 | N/A |
| Conservative | D. Cunningham | 1,025 | | N/A |
| Conservative | W. Weiland | 968 | | N/A |
| Majority | | | 15.3 | N/A |
| Turnout | | 2,494 | 70.5 | N/A |
| Registered electors | | 3,540 | | |
| Labour win (new seat) | | | | |
| Labour win (new seat) | | | | |
| Labour win (new seat) | | | | |

=== Waltham Abbey West ===
Waltham Abbey West
| Party | Candidate | Votes | % | ±% |
|---|---|---|---|---|
| Conservative | H. Smith | 1,150 | 51.1 | N/A |
| Conservative | G. Jailler | 1,128 | | N/A |
| Labour | A. Taylor | 1,101 | 48.9 | N/A |
| Labour | Ms G. Taylor | 895 | | N/A |
| Majority | | | 2.2 | N/A |
| Turnout | | 2,251 | 74.4 | N/A |
| Registered electors | | 3,025 | | |
| Conservative win (new seat) | | | | |
| Conservative win (new seat) | | | | |
