= Guadeloupe Conference =

Conference about Iranian political crisis

- Leader: Valéry Giscard d'Estaing (Host); Jimmy Carter; Helmut Schmidt; James Callaghan
- Founded: January 4, 1979
- Dissolved: January 7, 1979
- Headquarters: Saint-François, Guadeloupe, France
- Membership (1979): 4 sovereign heads of state/government
- Ideology: Atlanticism; Western bloc geopolitics; Détente strategy; Management of the Iranian Revolution

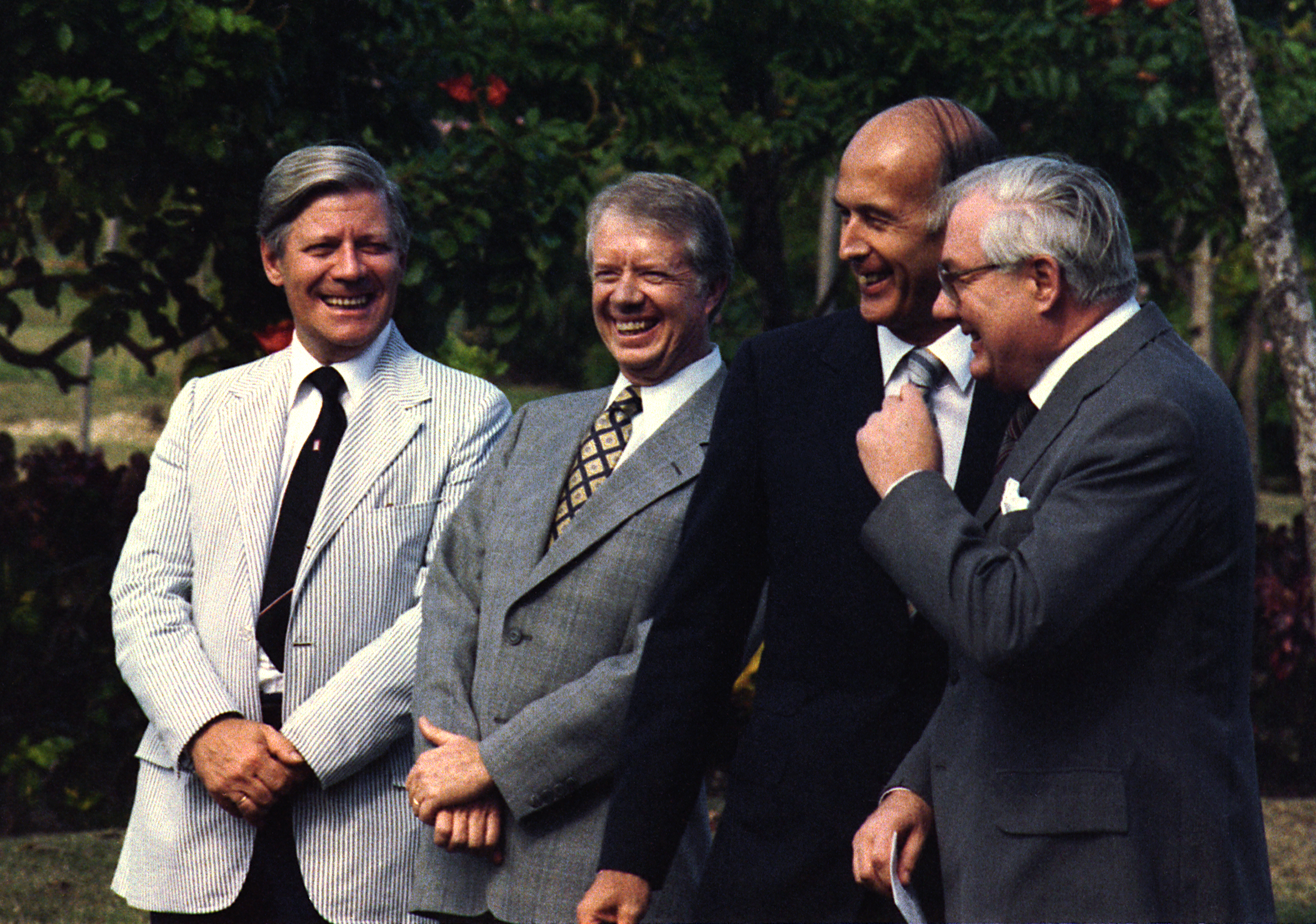
Helmut Schmidt, Jimmy Carter, Valéry Giscard d'Estaing, and James Callaghan in Guadeloupe island

The Guadeloupe Conference was a meeting in Guadeloupe, an overseas department and region of France, from 4 to 7 January 1979 involving leaders of four Western powers: the United States, the United Kingdom, France and West Germany. Discussions focused on various world issues, especially the Middle East and the Iranian political crisis.

== Meeting ==
A month before the Iranian Revolution succeeded in the overthrow of the monarchy, the President of France, Valéry Giscard d'Estaing, hosted the meeting in the French territory of Guadeloupe. Also in attendance were US President Jimmy Carter, Chancellor of West Germany Helmut Schmidt, and British Prime Minister James Callaghan.

== Discussion ==
The meeting's discussions focused on Iran's political crisis, the situation in Cambodia, violence in South Africa, the increasing influence of the Soviet Union in the Persian Gulf, the coup in Afghanistan, and the situation in Turkey. One of the main issues discussed was the political crisis in Iran which had led to an uprising against the Pahlavi dynasty. The assembled leaders concluded that there was no way to save Mohammad Reza Pahlavi's position as the Shah of Iran; and that if he remained as leader, this could further aggravate the civil war and might result in Soviet intervention.

== Impact ==
The leaders at the Guadeloupe Conference suggested that Shah leave Iran as early as possible. Following the meeting, domestic protests and opposition to the Pahlavi dynasty increased. After the conference ended, the Shah's regime collapsed and he left Iran for exile on 16 January 1979 as the last monarch of the Pahlavi dynasty.

=== Downfall of Callaghan government ===
The summit also contributed, indirectly, to Callaghan's election loss to Margaret Thatcher almost four months later. His participation in the summit had been preceded by a few days' holiday during which he was photographed swimming joyfully and wearing swimming trunks on the beach. During that same week Britain had been struggling with the economic impact of a severe winter storm and a lorry drivers' strike, the second of many industrial disputes which led to that season being remembered as the Winter of Discontent.

Upon Callaghan's return on 10 January, a political advisor, Tom McNally, convinced him to hold a brief news conference with waiting reporters after he disembarked at Heathrow Airport, against the advice of the prime minister's press secretary. McNally believed that Callaghan could reassure the public that he was in control by doing so. The impromptu news conference instead hurt Callaghan politically.

Callaghan at first focused on his own trip, jauntily pointing out how pleasant it had been to swim in the tropical waters off Guadeloupe. He suggested that Britain's domestic situation only looked as bad as it did because the media had exaggerated it, and cast aspersions on reporters' patriotism. Asked directly what he would do about "mounting chaos" in the UK, he responded: "[I]f you look at it from outside, and perhaps you're taking rather a parochial view at the moment, I don't think that other people in the world would share the view that there is mounting chaos."

The Sun, a newspaper which had recently switched its political allegiance from Callaghan's Labour to the opposition Conservatives, paraphrased this in a headline as "Crisis? What Crisis?". The Conservatives made much use of the phrase during the subsequent election, and in later campaigns.
