= Theodore Churton =

Theodore Townson Churton was an Anglican priest in the early 20th century.

He was born into an ecclesiastical family on 24 April 1853 and educated at New College, Oxford. He was ordained in 1883 and was Curate of Holy Trinity, Hastings until his appointment to his father's old parish at Icklesham in 1891. He was Archdeacon of Lewes from 1908 to 1912 and then of Hastings until his death on 1 June 1915.

== Notes ==
Church of England titles
Preceded by Robert Sutton	Archdeacon of Lewes; 1908 – 1912	Succeeded by Henry Kemble Southwell
Preceded by Inaugural appointment	Archdeacon of Hastings; 1912– 1915	Succeeded by Benedict George Hoskyns
