= Chandos Hoskyns (British Army officer) =

British Army officer (1895–1940)

Lieutenant Colonel Chandos Benedict Arden Hoskyns
- Born: 25 September 1895
- Died: 18 June 1940 (aged 44); Winchester, Hampshire, England
- Burial place: Chilworth, Hampshire, England
- Relatives: Benedict Hoskyns (father); John Hoskyns (son)
- Military career
- Allegiance: United Kingdom
- Branch: British Army
- Service years: 1914–1940
- Rank: Lieutenant Colonel
- Nickname: "Chan"
- Service number: 9657
- Unit: Rifle Brigade (The Prince Consort's Own)
- Commands: 1st Battalion, Rifle Brigade (The Prince Consort's Own)
- Conflicts/Battles: Battle of Loos (1915); Salonika (1916); Siege of Calais (1940)

Lieutenant Colonel Chandos Benedict Arden Hoskyns (25 September 1895 – 18 June 1940) was a professional soldier with the British Army, serving as part of the Rifle Brigade. He served on the Western Front and Salonika in the First World War. Between the wars, he was posted to India and was a military secretary in Malta. During the Second World War, he commanded a battalion in the siege of Calais, where he was mortally wounded.

== Early life ==
Hoskyns was born on 25 September 1895, the only son of the Venerable Archdeacon Benedict Hoskyns MA and Dora Katharine Hoskyns. Between 1909 and 1912 he studied at Winchester College in 'A' house before going on to Royal Military College, Sandhurst.

== First World War and inter-war years ==
=== First World War ===
After completing his studies at Sandhurst, Hoskyns was commissioned into the Rifle Brigade (The Prince Consort's Own) on 15 August 1914 just after the outbreak of the First World War. He trained as a subaltern on the Isle of Sheppey and then sailed to France with the 2nd Battalion. He became a machine gun officer and saw action in 1915, being wounded in the Battle of Loos. In 1917, he was promoted to captain, seeing further service on the Western Front and in Salonika. In Salonika, he served with the Machine Gun Corps (MGC) in its 77th Company. In the same year, Hoskyns was mentioned in dispatches and promoted to the temporary rank of major.

=== Inter-war years ===
After completing his wartime service, Hoskyns was made adjutant to the 8th Battalion (Territorial Army/TA) of the London Regiment. It was in this period he also saw service in India.

Between 1927 and 1931, Hoskyns served as Assistant Military Secretary to the Governor of Malta. He was a gifted actor and was known for the high standard of his amateur dramatic productions while on Malta:

'He was endowed with many gifts, but I suppose the one for which he was best known was his quite professional ability to produce plays. In the Malta Amateur Dramatic Club, where his death will be most keenly felt, his productions were always a by-word of excellence and they brought many an hour of enjoyment to actor and audience alike'.

— Obituary of Lieutenant-Colonel Chandos Hoskyns, The Times – 25/06/1940

Besides acting, he was also an enthusiastic polo player.

In 1935, Hoskyns was promoted to major before rising to lieutenant-colonel and was placed in command of the 1st Battalion of the Rifle Brigade in 1938.

=== Second World War ===
May 1940 saw the German invasion of Belgium, the Netherlands and France.

Hoskyns and his men were at Needham Market in Suffolk when they received their orders to make for Southampton on 21 May. Embarking at Southampton aboard SS Archangel, the battalion arrived at Calais on 23 May. They were there to defend the port. Panzer units under General Heinz Guderian were driving for the coast. This thrust would result in the French northern armies and the British Expeditionary Force being cut off from the southern armies and their lines of communication. For his part, Hoskyns was resistant to his orders, but due to a radio outage could not communicate his intention to command. The battle raged for four days, and on the afternoon of 25 May, Hoskyns was mortally wounded. A shell exploded nearby and a splinter struck him in the side. Evacuated via a small yacht, he died of his wounds in Winchester on 18 June 1940. His funeral was at Winchester Cathedral on 22 June before he was buried at Chilworth churchyard in Southampton.

At Calais, "[h]is ability was well known, and his death symbolized the sacrifice" of military talent and personnel among the 204 riflemen who died there.

== Associated organisations ==
- "British Army, Rifle Brigade, 5th (Reserve) Battalion
- British Army, Rifle Brigade, 2nd Battalion
- British Army, 25th Infantry Brigade
- British Army, 8th Division
- British Army, 77th Machine Gun Company
- British Army, 77th Infantry Brigade
- British Army, 26th Division
- British Army, Rifle Brigade, 1st Battalion"

== Personal life ==
On 26 July 1920, Hoskyns married Joyce Austin Taylor and they had two sons and a daughter. One son, John Hoskyns, also went to Winchester and served in the Rifle Brigade before becoming a successful businessman, founding the Hoskyns Group and then leading Margaret Thatcher's Number 10 Policy Unit.
