= Robert Sutton (archdeacon of Lewes) =

Robert Sutton was an Anglican priest in the late 19th and early 20th century.

He was born in 1832 and educated at Eton and at Exeter College, Oxford. He was ordained in 1856 and was Curate of St Botolph's Aldgate then the incumbent of St Leonards, Aston Clinton until 1861. He held further posts at Westhampnett, Slinfold and Pevensey before being appointed Archdeacon of Lewes in 1888. He retired in 1908 and died two years later.

== Notes ==
Church of England titles
Preceded by John Hannah	Archdeacon of Lewes; 1888–1908	Succeeded by Theodore Townson Churton
