= David Lipsey, Baron Lipsey =

British peer (1948–2025)

The Right Honourable The Lord Lipsey
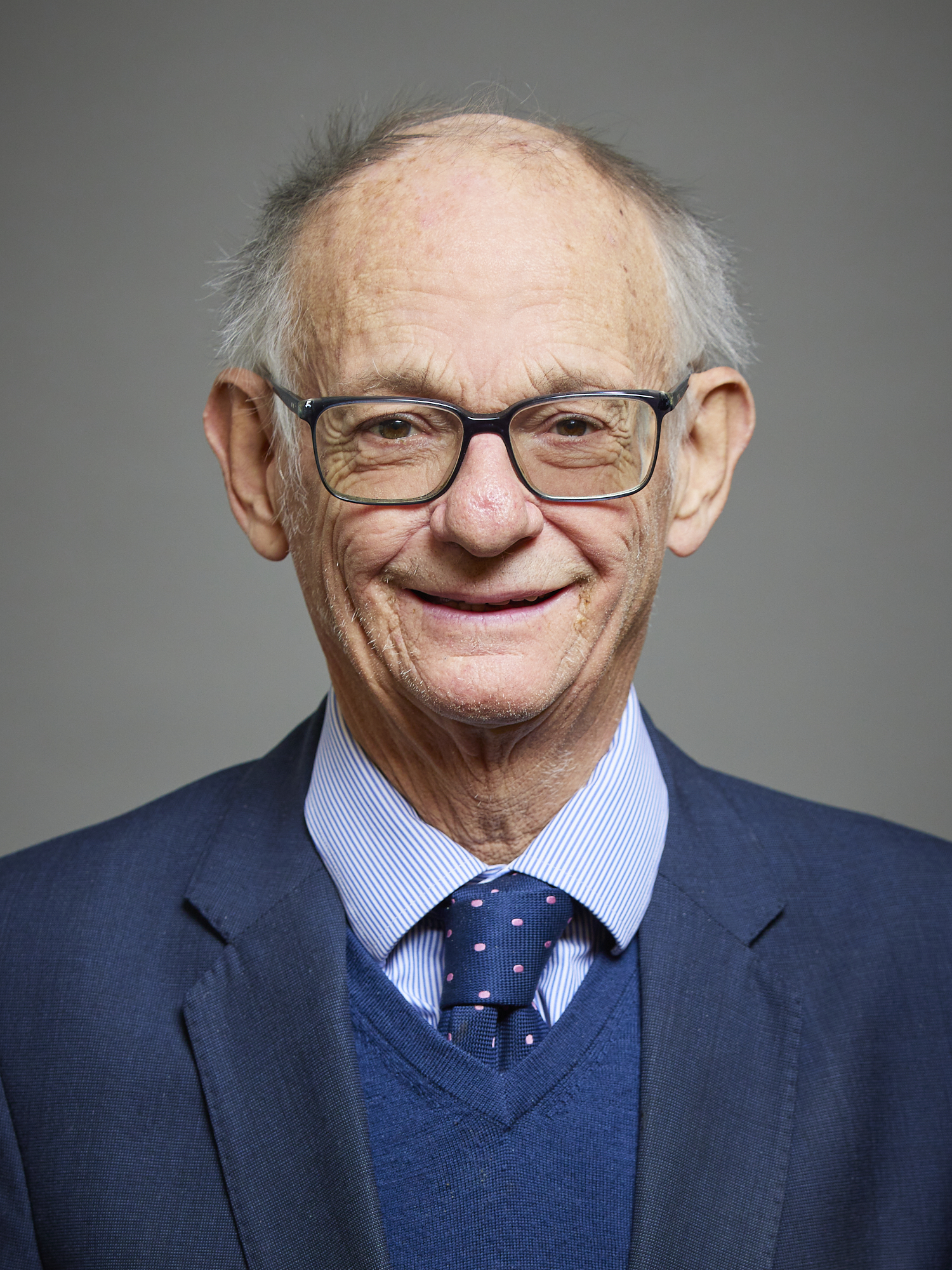
- Official portrait, 2023

Member of the House of Lords
- Lord Temporal
- Life peerage 30 July 1999 – 1 July 2025

Personal details
- Born: David Lawrence Lipsey; 21 April 1948
- Died: 1 July 2025 (aged 77) Glasbury, Powys, Wales
- Party: Labour
- Education: Bryanston School; Magdalen College, Oxford
- Occupation: Journalist and politician

David Lawrence Lipsey, Baron Lipsey (21 April 1948 – 1 July 2025) was a British journalist and Labour Party politician.

== Life and career ==
Lipsey was born 21 April 1947 to a Canadian non-practising Jewish father who came to the UK during WWII.

Lipsey was privately educated at Bryanston School, Dorset (1962–67), and later studied Politics, Philosophy and Economics (PPE) at Magdalen College, Oxford in 1968 and graduated with a First-Class degree, winning the university's Gibbs Prize in Politics in 1969.

From 1970 to 1972 he was secretary of the Streatham Labour Party.

He went on to become a political adviser to Anthony Crosland in Opposition and an adviser to 10 Downing Street. He was responsible for the coinage of the name "New Labour" and the phrase "Winter of Discontent" applied to the period of British politics between September 1978 and February 1979.

From 1982 to 1983, he was chairman of the Fabian Society.

He worked as a journalist for a variety of different publications including the Sunday Times, The Times, The Guardian and The Economist, and in 1989 co-founded The Sunday Correspondent (which, however, folded after fourteen months). He was awarded a Special Orwell Prize in 1997 for his work as 'Bagehot' (the weekly commentator on British current affairs) in The Economist.

Lipsey was created a life peer as Baron Lipsey, of Tooting Bec in the London Borough of Wandsworth, on 30 July 1999. He sat on the Labour benches in the House of Lords. Lipsey held numerous senior posts in public life. As well as his economic and social interests, he chaired the All-Party Parliamentary group on Classical Music (from 2011), was a patron of the Glasbury Arts Festival, a trustee of the Cambrian Orchestra Trust and chairman of the Sidney Nolan Trust (from 2011), as well as a trustee of other arts organisations.

Lipsey was a fan of harness racing and greyhound racing. He was president of the British Harness Racing Club from 2008 to 2016. He was a longtime member of the All-Party Parliamentary Greyhound Group, which owned a number of greyhounds including Division Bell and Go Running Whip. He was also chair of the British Greyhound Racing Board from 2004 to 2009 (before it became the Greyhound Board of Great Britain).

Lipsey died on 1 July 2025, at the age of 77, while swimming in the River Wye in Glasbury, Powys.

== Sources ==
- http://biographies.parliament.uk/parliament/default.asp?id=26939
- https://api.parliament.uk/historic-hansard/people/mr-david-lipsey/index.html
- http://lordsoftheblog.wordpress.com/the-authors/
- https://www.telegraph.co.uk/news/uknews/1351595/Life-in-the-Lords-is-too-tough-says-Labour-peer.html
- Catalogue of the Lipsey papers held at LSE Archives

Party political offices
Preceded by Shirley Williams	Chair of the Fabian Society; 1981–1982	Succeeded by Stella Meldram
