= Winter of Discontent =

Winter of 1978–79 in the United Kingdom

The Sun's headline "Crisis? What crisis?"

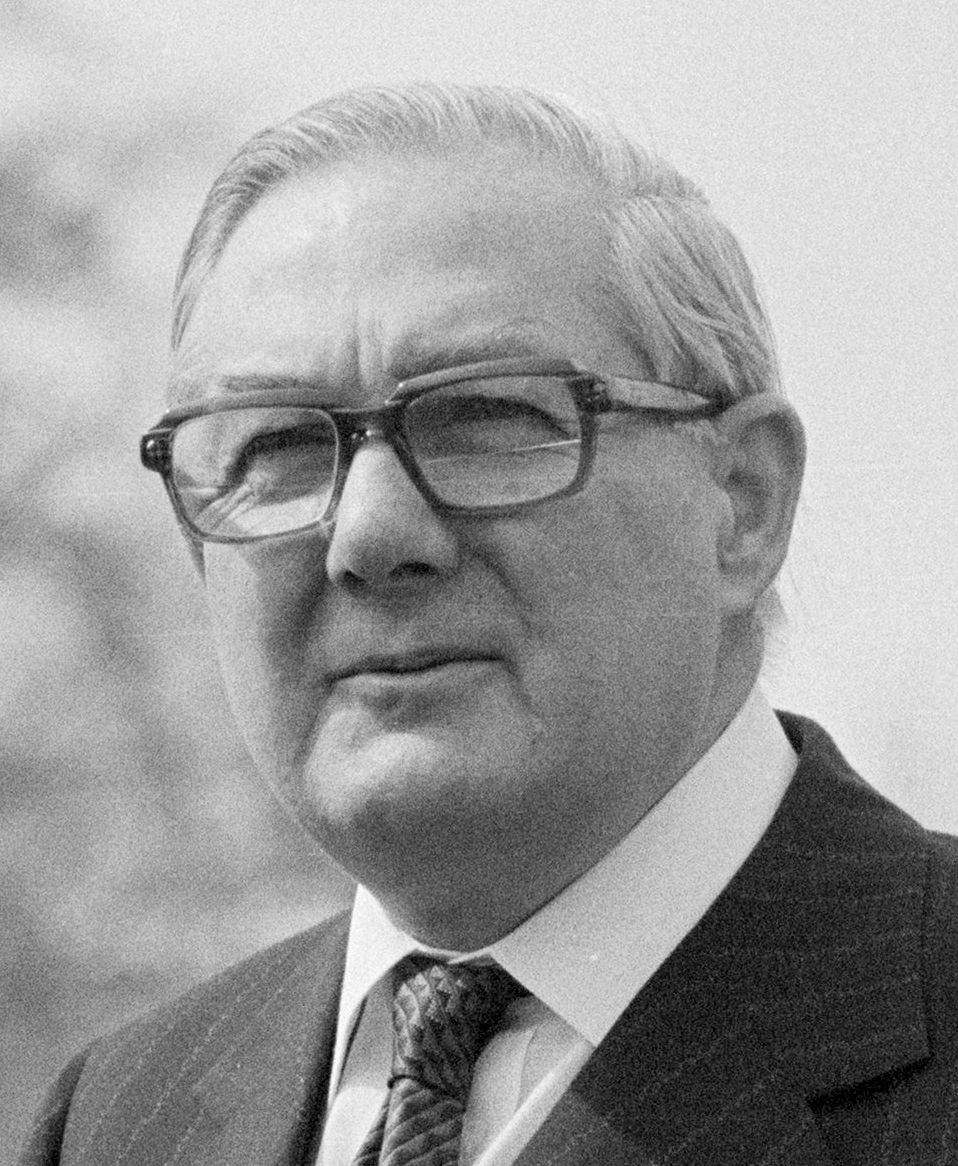
James Callaghan, Prime Minister during the Winter of Discontent, pictured in 1977

The Winter of Discontent was the period between late September 1978 and February 1979 in the United Kingdom characterised by widespread strikes by private, and later public sector trade unions demanding pay rises greater than the limits Prime Minister James Callaghan and his Labour Party government had been imposing, against Trades Union Congress (TUC) opposition, to control inflation. Some of these industrial disputes caused great public inconvenience, exacerbated by the coldest winter in 16 years, in which severe storms isolated many remote areas of the country.

A strike by workers at Ford in late 1978 was settled with a pay increase of 17 per cent, well above the 5 per cent limit the government was holding its own workers to with the intent of setting an example for the private sector to follow, after a resolution at the Labour Party's annual conference urging the government not to intervene passed overwhelmingly. At the end of the year a road hauliers' strike began, coupled with a severe storm as 1979 began. Later in the month many public workers followed suit as well. These actions included an unofficial strike by gravediggers working in Liverpool and Tameside, and strikes by binmen (or dustmen, as they were then known) leaving uncollected rubbish on streets and in public spaces, including London's Leicester Square. Additionally, NHS ancillary workers formed picket lines to blockade hospital entrances with the result that many hospitals were reduced to taking emergency patients only.

The unrest had deeper causes besides resentment of the caps on pay rises. Labour's internal divisions over its commitment to socialism, manifested in disputes over labour law reform and macroeconomic strategy during the 1960s and early 1970s, pitted constituency members against the party's establishment. Many of the strikes were initiated at the local level, with national union leaders largely unable to stop them. Union membership, particularly in the public sector, had grown more female and less white, and the growth of the public sector unions had not brought them a commensurate share of power within the TUC.

After Callaghan returned from a summit conference in the tropics at a time when the hauliers' strike and the weather had seriously disrupted the economy, leading thousands to apply for unemployment benefits, his denial that there was "mounting chaos" in the country was paraphrased in a famous Sun headline as "Crisis? What Crisis?". Conservative leader Margaret Thatcher's acknowledgement of the severity of the situation in a party political broadcast a week later was seen as instrumental to her victory in the general election held four months later after Callaghan's government fell to a no-confidence vote. Once in power, the Conservatives, who under Thatcher's leadership had begun criticising the unions as too powerful, passed legislation, similar to that proposed in a Labour white paper a decade earlier, that banned many practices, such as secondary picketing, that had magnified the effects of the strikes. Thatcher, and later other Conservatives like Boris Johnson, have continued to invoke the Winter of Discontent in election campaigns; it would be 18 years until another Labour government took power. In the late 2010s, after further Labour defeats, some British leftists argued that this narrative about the Winter of Discontent was inaccurate, and that policy in subsequent decades was much more harmful to Britain.

The term "Winter of Discontent" is taken from the opening line of William Shakespeare's play Richard III. It has been credited to Larry Lamb, then editor at The Sun, in an editorial on 3 May 1979. However, it was used earlier by Lord Lipsey in a 1978 Downing Street note and was credited to him in several obituaries.

== Background ==
The Winter of Discontent was driven by a combination of different social, economic and political factors which had been developing for over a decade.

=== Divisions in Labour Party over macroeconomic strategy ===
Under the influence of Anthony Crosland, a member of the more moderate Gaitskellite wing of the Labour Party in the 1950s, the party establishment came to embrace a more moderate course of action than it had in its earlier years before the Second World War. Crosland had argued in his book The Future of Socialism that the government exerted enough control over private industry that it was not necessary to nationalise it as the party had long called to do, and that the ultimate goals of socialism could be as readily achieved by assuring long-term economic stability and building out the social welfare state. His "revisionist" views became Labour's perspective on the post-war consensus, in which both they and the Conservative Party agreed in principle on a strong government role in the economy, strong unions and a welfare state as foundational to Britain's prosperity.

In the 1970s, following the surge in radical left-wing politics of the late 1960s, that view was challenged in another Labour figure's book, Stuart Holland's The Socialist Challenge. He argued that contrary to Crosland's assertions, the government could exercise little control over Britain's largest companies, which were likely to continue consolidating into an oligopoly that, by the 1980s, could raise prices high enough that governments following Keynesian economics would be unable to ensure their citizens the opportunity for full employment that they had been able to since the war, and exploit transfer pricing to avoid paying British taxes. Holland called for returning to nationalisation, arguing that taking control of the top 25 companies that way would result in a market with more competition and less inflation.

Holland's ideas formed the basis of the Alternative Economic Strategy (AES) promoted by Tony Benn, then Secretary of State for Industry in the Labour governments of Harold Wilson and James Callaghan as they considered responses to the 1976 sterling crisis. The AES called on Britain to adopt a protectionist stance in international trade, including reversing its recent decision to join the European Common Market, and impose no incomes policies to combat inflation. Benn believed that this approach was more in keeping with Labour's traditional policies and would have its strongest supporters in the unions, with them vigorously supporting the government against opposition from the financial sector and "commanding heights" of industry. It was ultimately rejected in favour of the social contract and extensive cuts in public spending as the condition of an International Monetary Fund loan that supported the pound after the sterling crisis.

The left wing of the Labour Party, while critical of the revisionist approach and the Social Contract, was not universally supportive of the AES either. Many thought it did not go far enough, or avoided the issue of nationalisation. Feminists in particular criticised it for its focus on traditionally male-dominated manufacturing jobs and ignoring the broader issues that the increasing number of women in the workforce faced, preferring a focus on broader social issues rather than just working conditions and pay, the traditional areas unions had negotiated with employers.

=== 1960s–70s labour law reforms ===
In 1968 Wilson's government appointed the Donovan Commission to review British labour law with an eye toward reducing the days lost to strikes every year; many Britons had come to believe the unions were too powerful despite the country's economic growth since the war. It found much of the problem to lie in a parallel system of 'official' signed agreements between unions and employers, and 'unofficial', often unwritten ones at the local level, between shop stewards and managers, which often took precedence in practice over the official ones. The government responded with In Place of Strife, a white paper by Employment Secretary Barbara Castle, which recommended restrictions on unions' ability to strike, such as requiring strikes take place after a member vote and fining unions for unofficial strikes.

The Trades Union Congress (TUC) vigorously opposed making Castle's recommendations law, and Callaghan, then Home Secretary, led a cabinet revolt which led to its abandonment. Callaghan did not believe it would be effective in curtailing unofficial strikes, that the proposals could not pass, and the effort would create unnecessary tension between the government and the unions that were key to its political strength.

After the Conservatives won the following year's election, they implemented their own legislation to address the issue. The Industrial Relations Act 1971, modeled in part on the U.S. Taft–Hartley Act, passed over determined union opposition, included many of the same provisions as In Place of Strife, and explicitly stated that formal collective bargaining agreements would have the force of law unless they had disclaimers to the contrary. It also created a National Industrial Relations Court to handle disputes and put unions under a central registry to enforce their rules.

New Prime Minister Edward Heath hoped that the new law would not only address the strike issue but the steep inflation plaguing the British economy (along with other industrial capitalist economies) at the time, eliminating the need for a separate incomes policy by having a moderating effect on pay increases demanded by unions. Ongoing union resistance to the Industrial Relations Act led to a House of Lords ruling in their favor over demonstrations and widespread unofficial strikes following the Pentonville Five's imprisonment for continuing to picket a London container depot in violation of a court order, which undermined the legislation. Coal miners officially went on strike for the first time in almost half a century in 1972; after two months the strike was settled with the miners getting a 21 per cent increase, less than half of what they had originally sought.

Heath turned to an incomes policy; inflation continued to worsen. The incomes policy was abandoned in 1973 when that year's oil embargo nearly doubled prices within months. To meet demand for heat in the wintertime, the government had to return to coal, giving the National Union of Mineworkers more leverage. The government declared a state of emergency that November, and at the beginning of 1974 limited all nonessential businesses to three days of electricity each week to conserve power. Miners, who had seen their rise from two years before turn into a pay cut in real terms due to the inflation the government had not brought under control, voted overwhelmingly to go on strike in late January.

Two weeks later, the government responded by calling an election, running on the slogan "Who Governs Britain?". At the end of the month the Conservatives no longer did; Labour and Wilson returned, but without a majority. They were able to pass the Health and Safety at Work etc. Act 1974, which repealed the Heath government's Industrial Relations Act.

In October Wilson won a majority of three seats; still they needed an agreement with the Liberal Party to have a majority on many issues. Callaghan, now Foreign Secretary, attended an informal meeting at Chequers alongside his fellow Cabinet members, where he speculated about the possibility of a "breakdown of democracy", joking with them that "[i]f I were a young man, I would emigrate."

=== Incomes policy ===
Wilson, and Callaghan, who succeeded him as prime minister after Wilson resigned for health reasons in 1976, continued to fight inflation, which peaked at 26.9 per cent in the 12 months to August 1975. While demonstrating to markets fiscal responsibility the government wished to avoid large increases in unemployment. As part of the campaign to bring down inflation, the government had agreed a "Social Contract" with the TUC which allowed for a voluntary incomes policy in which the pay rises for workers were held down to limits set by the government. Previous governments had brought in incomes policies backed by Acts of Parliament, but the Social Contract agreed that this would not happen.

==== Phases I and II ====
Phase I of the pay policy was introduced on 11 July 1975 with a white paper entitled The Attack on Inflation. This proposed a limit on wage rises of £6 per week for all earning below £8,500 annually. The TUC General Council accepted these proposals by 19 votes to 13. On 5 May 1976 the TUC accepted a new policy for 1976 increases, beginning 1 August, of between £2.50 and £4 per week with further years outlined. At the Annual Congress on 8 September 1976 the TUC rejected a motion which called for a return to free collective bargaining (which meant no incomes policy at all) once Phase I expired on 1 August 1977. This new policy was Phase II of the incomes policy.

==== Phase III ====
On 15 July 1977, the Chancellor of the Exchequer Denis Healey launched Phase III of the incomes policy in which there was to be a phased return to free collective bargaining, without "a free-for-all". After prolonged negotiations, the TUC agreed to continue with the modest increases recommended for 1977–78 under Phase II limits and not to try to reopen pay agreements made under the previous policy, while the government agreed not to intervene in pay negotiations. The Conservative Party criticised the power of the unions and lack of any stronger policy to cover the period from the summer of 1978. The inflation rate continued to fall through 1977 and by 1978 the annual rate was below 10 per cent.

At the end of the year Bernard Donoughue, Callaghan's chief policy advisor, sent him a memo analysing possible election dates. He concluded that the following October or November would be the best option, as the economy was likely to remain in good shape through then. After that, he wrote, the outlook was unclear, with pressure from the government's own incomes policy likely.

==== Five per cent limit ====
At a May 1978 Downing Street lunch with editors and reporters from the Daily Mirror, Callaghan asked if they believed it was possible that the planned Phase IV would succeed, as he believed it would if the unions and their members understood it was the best way to keep Labour in power. Most told him that it would be difficult, but not impossible. Geoffrey Goodman disagreed, saying in his view it would be impossible for the union leaders to keep their membership from demanding higher pay increases. "If that is the case, then I will go over the heads of the trade union leadership and appeal directly to their members—and the voters", the prime minister responded. "We have to hold the line on pay or else the government will fall."

On 21 July 1978 Chancellor of the Exchequer Denis Healey introduced a new white paper which set a guideline for pay rises of 5 per cent in the year from 1 August. Callaghan was determined to keep inflation down to single figures; however, trade union leaders warned the government that the 5 per cent limit was unachievable, and urged a more flexible approach with a range of settlements between 5 and 8 per cent. Terry Duffy, president of the AUEW, described the limit as 'political suicide'. Healey also privately expressed scepticism about the achievability of the limit. The TUC voted overwhelmingly on 26 July to reject the limit and insist on a return to free collective bargaining as they were promised.

It had been widely expected that Callaghan would call a general election in the autumn, and that the 5 per cent limit would be revised if Labour won. At a private dinner before that year's TUC conference, Callaghan discussed election strategy with the leaders of major unions. He asked whether he should call an autumn election; with the exception of Hugh Scanlon, the president of the Confederation of Shipbuilding and Engineering Unions, they all urged him to call for one no later than November. Any later, they said, and they could not guarantee their memberships would remain on the job and off the picket line through the winter.

Unexpectedly, however, on 7 September, Callaghan stated that he would not be calling a general election that autumn but seeking to go through the winter with continued pay restraint so that the economy would be in a better state in preparation for a spring election, therefore the 5 per cent limit stood. Although the government did not make the 5 per cent limit a legal requirement, it decided to impose penalties on private and public government contractors who broke the limit.

=== Changes in labour movement ===
Between 1966 and 1979, Britain's unions were changing and becoming more diverse. Most of the increase in union membership was driven by women returning to or entering the workforce—73 per cent of them joined a union during that period against 19.3 per cent of men newly in work, as manufacturing jobs, traditionally heavily male, disappeared. Black and Asian workers also filled union ranks; in 1977, 61 per cent of black men in work belonged to a union as opposed to 47 per cent of white men. Asian women became the face of the labour movement during the 1976–1978 Grunwick dispute over pay and conditions at a film processing plant in suburban London.

Within unions, power was also devolving to the rank and file. The political upheavals of the late 1960s in Europe and the United States had brought participatory democracy to the fore, and workers felt they should be taking decisions, including about when and whether to strike, that had hitherto been the province of union leadership. Hugh Scanlon, who took over as head of the Amalgamated Union of Engineering Workers (AUEW) in 1967, and Jack Jones, general secretary of the Transport and General Workers' Union (TGWU) from shortly afterwards, were known among union leaders as "the dubious duo" for their advocacy for devolution.

==== Dissatisfied public employees ====
Many new members were also coming from government jobs. In 1974, about half of the total British workforce was unionised, but 83.1 per cent of all public-sector workers were. In the health sector that reached 90 per cent. Many of the government workers joining unions were women.

The public employees were in a particularly difficult position with regard to incomes policy. Governments kept their employees' pay, already lower than their private-sector colleagues, low both because they could and because they wanted to set an example for the private sector, an example the private sector rarely followed. Their unions were also frustrated that their growing numbers had not yet translated into corresponding influence within the TUC.

These matters came to a head with the 1977 fire brigade strike, a strike that many firemen were conflicted about since they knew they would be abandoning their own profession's duty to protect life, but felt that they could no longer make ends meet with their pay packets. They asked for a 30 per cent increase, 20 per cent over the government's limit at the time, and a limit to 42 hours of work each week. The government responded by declaring a state of emergency and bringing in Army troops as replacements. The TUC voted late in the strike to not campaign in support of the firemen, in order to maintain its relationship with the government.

=== "Stepping Stones" and hardening of Conservative position on unionism ===
Margaret Thatcher was elected Conservative leader to succeed Heath in 1975. She had been known as a member of his Cabinet, where she served as Secretary of State for Education, for her advocacy of market-based solutions over government intervention in the economy, and had become convinced, as she wrote later, by that experience that the only thing more damaging to the British economy than Labour's socialist policies was her own party's attempts to emulate them. Influenced by writers such as Friedrich Hayek and Colm Brogan, she came to believe the power of British unions under the postwar consensus had come at the expense of Britain as a whole.

In 1977 two of her advisors, John Hoskyns and Norman Strauss, prepared a report called "Stepping Stones" which diagrammed the vicious cycle through which they believed the unions' influence exacerbated Britain's ongoing economic difficulties, such as unemployment and inflation. Thatcher made it available to her shadow cabinet with the authors' recommendation that they all read it. By the end of the year she had formed a steering group to develop a specific policy aimed at curbing union power under a Tory government, and a media strategy that would invest the public in this.

To implement the media strategy, the party hired the advertising firm of Saatchi & Saatchi, whose 1978 "Labour Isn't Working" campaign has been credited with persuading Callaghan not to hold an election that year. (Note: Like his counterpart Donoughue, Hoskyns had concluded that the optimal time for an election for Labour was earlier, in the spring of 1978, with autumn being still slightly favorable, but the economic prospects unclear after that. He also preferred a later election as it would give the party the time necessary to make its case for a radical change in Britain's relations with its unions.) In 1978 Britain's largest tabloid, The Sun, dropped its longtime support for Labour to instead embrace the Tories. Editor Larry Lamb met frequently with Thatcher's media advisor Gordon Reece to plan and refine strategy. During the later phases of the Grunwick dispute, as strikers took to the streets to march and sometimes clashed violently with the police, the Tories began using the media coverage to leverage the critique of unionism contained in "Stepping Stones".

== Ford negotiations ==
Although not an official guideline, the pay rise set by Ford of Britain was accepted throughout private industry as a benchmark for negotiations. Ford had enjoyed a good year, and could afford to offer a large pay rise to its workers. The company was, however, also a major government contractor. Ford's management therefore made a pay offer within the 5 per cent guidelines. In response, 15,000 Ford workers, mostly from the Transport and General Workers Union (TGWU), began an unofficial strike on 22 September 1978, which subsequently became an official TGWU action on 5 October. The number of participants grew to 57,000. The strike prevented the production of 115,000 vehicles which cost Ford around $885 million.

During the strike, Vauxhall Motors employees accepted an 8.5 per cent rise. After long negotiation in which they weighed the chances of suffering from government sanctions against the continued damage of the strike, Ford eventually revised their offer to 17 per cent and decided to accept the sanctions; Ford workers accepted the rise on 22 November.

== Political difficulties ==
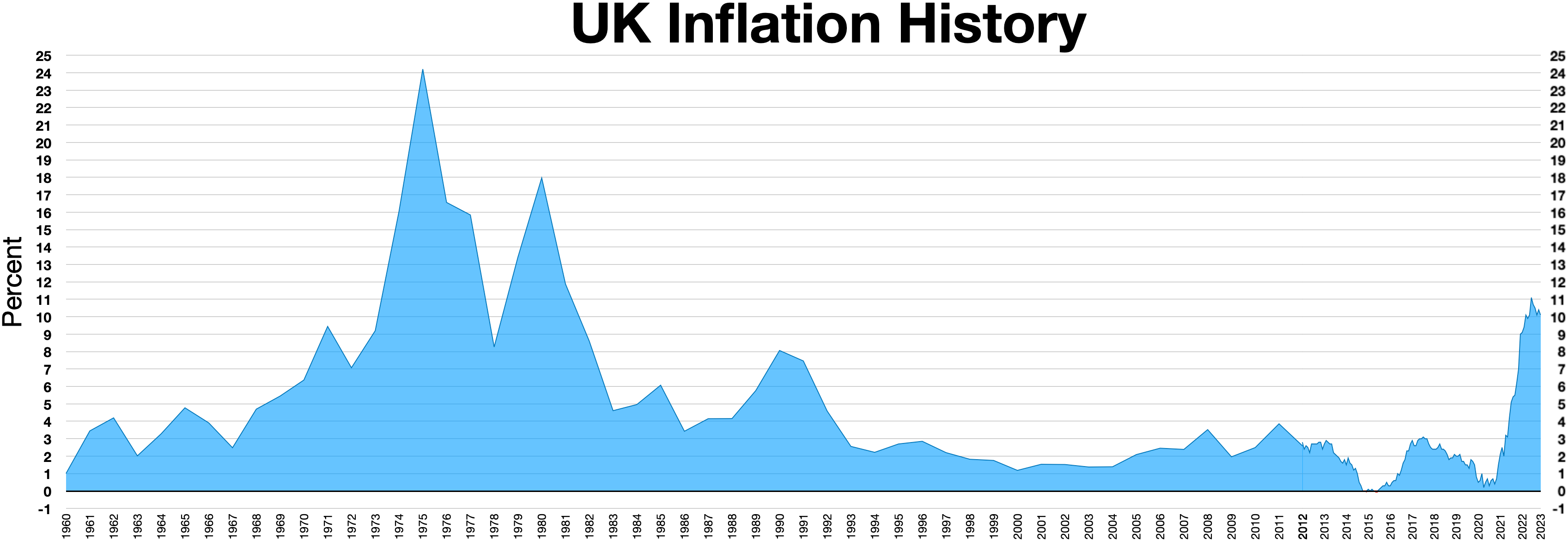
UK inflation history 1976 sterling crisis

As the Ford strike was starting, the Labour Party conference began at Blackpool. Terry Duffy, the delegate from Liverpool Wavertree Constituency Labour Party and a supporter of the Militant group, moved a motion on 2 October which demanded "that the Government immediately cease intervening in wage negotiations". Despite a plea from Michael Foot not to put the motion to the vote, the resolution was carried by 4,017,000 to 1,924,000. The next day, the Prime Minister accepted the fact of defeat by saying "I think it was a lesson in democracy yesterday", but insisted that he would not let up on the fight against inflation.

Meanwhile, the government's situation in the House of Commons was increasingly difficult; through by-elections it had lost its majority of three seats in 1976 and had been forced to put together a pact with the Liberal Party in 1977 in order to keep winning votes on legislation; the pact lapsed in July 1978. A decision to grant extra parliamentary seats to Northern Ireland afforded temporary support from the Ulster Unionist Party, but the Unionists were clear that this support would be withdrawn immediately after the bill to grant extra seats had been passed – it was through the Ulster Unionists agreeing to abstain that the government defeated a motion of no confidence by 312 to 300 on 9 November.

=== Further negotiation at the TUC ===
By the middle of November it was clear that Ford would offer an increase substantially over the 5 per cent limit. The government subsequently entered into intense negotiations with the TUC, hoping to produce an agreement on pay policy that would prevent disputes and show political unity in the run-up to the general election. A limited and weak formula was eventually worked out and put to the General Council of the TUC on 14 November, but its General Council vote was tied 14–14, with the formula being rejected on the chair's casting vote. One important personality on the TUC General Council had changed earlier in 1978 with Moss Evans replacing Jack Jones at the TGWU. Evans proved a weak leader of his union, although it is doubtful whether Jones could have restrained the actions of some of the TGWU shop stewards.

After Ford settled, the government on 28 November decided to impose sanctions on Ford, along with 220 other companies, for breach of the pay policy. This decision produced an immediate protest from the Confederation of British Industry which challenged the legality of the sanctions. The Conservatives put down a motion in the House of Commons to revoke the sanctions. A co-ordinated protest by left-wing Labour MPs over spending on defence forced the debate set for 7 December to be postponed; however, on 13 December an anti-sanctions amendment was passed by 285 to 279. The substantive motion as amended was then passed by 285 to 283. James Callaghan put down a further motion of confidence for the next day, which the government won by ten votes (300 to 290), but accepted that his government could not use sanctions. In effect this deprived the government of any means of enforcing the 5 per cent limit on private industry.

== Onset of severe winter weather ==
A mild autumn turned cold on the morning of 25 November when temperatures recorded at Heathrow Airport dropped from 14 °C (57 °F) to 0 °C (32 °F) overnight, with some snowflakes. Throughout most of the following month, the cold lingered, only for temperatures to rise well above 10 °C (50 °F) around Christmas. On 30 December, the temperature dropped again, along with rain that soon turned to snow; the next day 1978 ended with Heathrow recording a high of only −3 °C (27 °F) amid steady snowfall.

The effects were more severe outside of London. Ilfracombe and other towns in North Devon could only be reached by helicopter as many roads could not be adequately cleared. The Royal Automobile Club blamed local councils, who in turn pointed to unresolved issues with their unions and staff shortages; even around London local authorities were only able to clear main roads. Two Scottish trains near Stirling were stuck in the snow, leaving 300 passengers stranded; rail transport difficulties were exacerbated elsewhere in the country by a strike. Tanker drivers had also gone on strike in some areas from 18 December, causing some homeowners to have difficulties keeping their homes heated and limiting petrol supplies. Only three League football matches could take place over the New Year's holiday, and all rugby contests were cancelled. Three men drowned after falling through the ice on the Hampstead Heath pond in London.

== Lorry drivers' strike ==
With the government now having no way of enforcing its pay policy, unions which had not yet put in pay claims began to increase their aim. Lorry drivers, represented by the TGWU, had demanded rises of up to 40 per cent on 18 December; years of expansion in the industry had left employers short of drivers, and those drivers who had jobs often worked 70–80 hours a week for minimal pay. The Road Haulage Association (RHA), the industry trade group, had initially told Transport Secretary William Rodgers, a member of the Labour Party's right wing who had become sceptical of the public's appetite for the completion of the party's socialist programme, that it would stay within the 5 per cent ceiling but as 1979 began, the RHA, whom Rodgers saw as disorganised and easily intimidated by the TGWU, suddenly increased its offer to 13 per cent, in hopes of settling before strikes became widespread.

The offer had the opposite effect. Drivers, emboldened by memories of a strike the previous winter by South Wales hauliers that won participants a 20 per cent rise, decided they could do better by walking out. The union's national leadership was, as they had anticipated in their September dinner with Callaghan, doubtful they could restrain the local leaders. On 2 January Rodgers warned the Cabinet that a national road-haulage strike was about to happen, but cautioned against pressuring the RHA to improve their offer even more.

The next day an unofficial strike of all TGWU lorry drivers began. With petrol distribution held up, petrol stations closed across the country. The strikers also picketed the main ports. The strikes were made official on 11 January by the TGWU and 12 January by the United Road Transport Union. With 80 per cent of the nation's goods transported by road, and roads still not completely cleared from the earlier storm, essential supplies were put in danger as striking drivers picketed those firms that continued to work. While the oil tanker drivers were working, the main refineries were also targeted and the tanker drivers let the strikers know where they were going, allowing for flying pickets to turn them back at their destination. More than a million UK workers were laid off temporarily during the disputes.

In Kingston upon Hull, striking hauliers were able to blockade the city's two main roads effectively enough to control what goods were allowed into and out of the city, and companies made their case to their own nominal employees to get past the barricades. Newspaper headlines likened the situation to a siege, and the Battle of Stalingrad; fears that food supplies would also be impacted fuelled panic buying. Such coverage often exaggerated the reach of the strikers, which served both their interest and their employers'. It also helped the Conservatives disseminate the arguments of "Stepping Stones" about unionism out of control to the public; letters to the editor across the country reflected a growing public anger with the unions.

Due to the disruption of fuel supplies, the Cabinet Office prepared to implement previous plans for "Operation Drumstick", by which the Army were put on standby to take over from the tanker drivers. However, the operation would need the declaration of a state of emergency in order to allow conscription of the assets of the oil companies, and the government drew back from such a step on 18 January. Rodgers in particular was opposed to it, since the available troops could at best only make up for a very small portion of the striking drivers, and it might be possible to use them more effectively without declaring an emergency. Before the situation developed into a crisis the oil companies settled on wage rises of around 15 per cent.

The Cabinet also decided that same day that it would not take action to limit any hauling company's profits, thereby allowing them to increase their offer to the strikers. Rodgers was so disheartened by this that he wrote a resignation letter to Callaghan, saying "the Government is not even in the front line" and accusing it of "defeatism of a most reprehensible kind". He ultimately decided to remain in the Cabinet.

A further plan was drawn up to call a state of emergency and safeguard essential supplies through the Army, regarding which the government warned the TGWU leadership, which resulted in the union accepting on 12 January 1979 a list of emergency supplies which were officially exempt from action. In practice, what counted as an emergency was left up to local officials of the TGWU to determine, and practice across the country varied according to the views of the local shop stewards who established "dispensation committees" to decide. When strikers in Hull did not allow the correct mix of animal feed through to local farms, the farmers dropped the bodies of dead piglets and chickens outside the union offices; the union contended that the farmers had actually wrung the chicken's necks to kill them, and the piglets had been killed when the sow rolled over and crushed them.

Demonstrations against the strike took place in Liverpool and Manchester, met by counterdemonstrations in support. In Birmingham, violence erupted on 17 January when three hundred women working at the Cadbury Schweppes plant in Bournville heard that a flying picket was moving into place to attempt to block a delivery. Swinging their handbags and umbrellas, they quickly drove away the striking lorry drivers, whom they outnumbered by twenty to one. The incident made national news.

Some hauliers attempted to return to work without waiting for an offer. A group in the Shropshire town of Oakengates organised a convoy, but it was unable to leave town as the ungritted roads proved too slippery to drive.

On 29 January, lorry drivers in the South West accepted a deal awarded by an arbitration panel of a rise of up to 20 per cent, just £1 per week less than the union had been striking for; this settlement proved a model which was accepted throughout the country.

After the drivers returned to work, some media outlets took a second look at the shortages and found that they had been more a matter of fear than reality. The Economist reported that many predicted shortages of foods had not actually taken place. Douglas Smith of the Employment Department recalled years later that he only recalled certain breakfast cereals being out of stock, and Rodgers, too, agreed that the job losses had not been as severe as they seemed they would be but the fears of disruption had had an impact on the national mood even if little of what was feared had actually come to pass.

== Media response by Callaghan and Thatcher ==
=== "Crisis? What crisis?" ===
While Britain was dealing with the strike and the aftermath of the storm, Callaghan was in the Caribbean, attending a summit in Guadeloupe with U.S. President Jimmy Carter, German chancellor Helmut Schmidt and French president Valéry Giscard d'Estaing discussing the growing crisis in Iran and the proposed SALT II arms control treaty with the Soviet Union. He also spent a few days afterwards on holiday in Barbados, where he was photographed by the Daily Mail wearing a bathing suit and swimming in the sun. The newspaper used the images at the end of a lengthy leader lamenting the state of affairs in Britain.

On 10 January, as the temperature climbed above freezing in southern and low-lying areas of Britain for the first time since the storm, Callaghan returned. Having been tipped off that the press were present, his press secretary Tom McCaffrey advised him to say nothing and return immediately to work, but his political adviser Tom McNally thought that the image of Callaghan returning and declaring his intent to take control of the situation would be reassuring. Callaghan therefore decided to give a press conference at Heathrow Airport. To McNally's dismay Callaghan was jocular and referred to having had a swim in the Caribbean during the summit. On his first questions he was asked about the situation in Britain; he responded by angrily suggesting the press had exaggerated matters (Note: Callaghan was correct in the case of at least one newspaper. Two decades later, Daily Express editor Derek Jameson admitted that, having decided Callaghan and Labour had to go, he and his staff (and by implication some of the other tabloids) deliberately overstated the extent of the strike and the disruption it caused.) and perhaps did not truly love their country. McNally was chagrined; this was not how he had expected things to go.

Callaghan was then asked by a reporter from the Evening Standard, "What is your general approach, in view of the mounting chaos in the country at the moment?" Callaghan replied:

Well, that's a judgment that you are making. I promise you that if you look at it from outside, and perhaps you're taking rather a parochial view at the moment, I don't think that other people in the world would share the view that there is mounting chaos.

The next day's edition of The Sun headlined its story "Crisis? What crisis?" with a subheading "Rail, lorry, jobs chaos – and Jim blames Press", condemning Callaghan as being "out of touch" with British society. The phrase "Crisis? What crisis?" had entered public consciousness in the 1973 film The Day of the Jackal and had been further popularized by Supertramp's 1975 album of the same name.

While he had never used those exact words, Callaghan's speechwriter Roger Carroll agreed they were an effective paraphrase. "He asked for it, I'm afraid, and he got it." Callaghan would be closely associated with the phrase for the rest of his life.

=== Conservative response ===
Thatcher, the Leader of the Opposition, had been calling for the government to declare a state of emergency to deal with the strike during the first week of January. She also called for the immediate enactment of reforms that "Stepping Stones", and before it In Place of Strife had proposed: a ban on secondary picketing of third-party businesses not targeted directly by a strike, ending closed shop contracts under which employers can only hire those already members of a union, requiring votes by secret ballot before strikes and in the elections of union officials, and securing no-strike agreements with public-sector unions that provided vital public services, such as fire, health care and utilities.

A week later, as the cold returned and Britons had begun filing claims for unemployment benefit by the thousands, Thatcher addressed the situation in a party political broadcast. From a small sitting room she spoke, she said, not as a politician but as a Briton. "Tonight I don't propose to use the time to make party political points", she told viewers. "I do not think you would want me to do so. The crisis that our country faces is too serious for that."

The disruptions caused by the strikes had led Thatcher to "wonder what has happened to our sense of common nationhood and even of common humanity". She traced those to the unions' broad abilities to picket and strike, allowing almost any of them to "strangle the country". Most unionists, she allowed, did not support such extreme tactics.

=== Labour response ===
In its own party broadcast on 24 January, Labour ignored the situation entirely. Instead, a Manchester city councillor argued for increasing council housing in his city. Party members privately expressed great disappointment with Callaghan and his Cabinet for both failing to seize a crucial opportunity to win over the public and continuing to downplay the severity of the crisis. "How do you think that we the Party workers are going to go out and seek support from the public if this is the best you people can do at Transport House?" wrote one.

== Public sector employees ==
Bitter winter weather returned after a week of milder temperatures on 22 January. Freezing rain began falling across England at noon; by midnight temperatures dropped further and it turned to snow, which continued falling into the next day. Once again roads were impassable in the south; in the north and at higher elevations areas that had not yet recovered from the storm three weeks prior were newly afflicted.

A month earlier the public sector unions had set that day as the biggest individual day of strike action since the General Strike of 1926, and many workers stayed out indefinitely afterwards. With many in the private sector having achieved substantial rises, the public sector unions became increasingly concerned to keep pace in terms of pay. The government had already slightly weakened the policy on 16 January, which gave the unions cause for hope that they might win and use free collective bargaining. Train drivers belonging to ASLEF and the National Union of Railwaymen had already begun a series of 24-hour strikes, and the Royal College of Nursing conference on 18 January decided to ask that the pay of nurses be increased to the same level in real terms as 1974, which would mean a 25 per cent average rise. The public sector unions labelled the date the "Day of Action", in which they held a 24-hour strike and marched to demand a £60 per week minimum wage. It would later be recalled as "Misery Monday" by the media.

With the succession of strikes having been called and then won, many groups of workers began to take unofficial action – often without the consent or support of the union leaderships. Ambulance drivers began to take strike action in mid-January, and in parts of the country (London, West Midlands, Cardiff, Glasgow and the west of Scotland) their action included refusing to attend 999 emergency calls. In these areas, the Army was drafted in to provide a skeleton service. Ancillary hospital staff also went on strike. On 30 January, David Ennals, Secretary of State for Social Services, announced that 1,100 of 2,300 NHS hospitals were only treating emergencies, that practically no ambulance service was operating normally, and that the ancillary health service workers were deciding which cases merited treatment. The media reported with scorn that cancer patients were being prevented from getting essential treatment.

=== Gravediggers' strike ===
At a strike committee meeting in the Liverpool area earlier in January, it was reported that although local binmen were supportive of the strike, they did not want to be the first to do so as they had always been. The committee then asked Ian Lowes, convener for the General and Municipal Workers' Union (GMWU) local, to have the gravediggers and crematorium workers he represented take the lead instead. He accepted, as long as the other unions followed; and the GMWU's national executive approved the strike.

Those unions had never gone on strike before, Lowes recalled in 2006, and he had not expected that permission to be granted. "I knew how the press was going to latch on to it," he said, "and they totally underestimated the venom that headed our way." Larry Whitty, an executive official with the union, also agreed later that it had been a mistake to approve the strike. The GMWU at the time was also known as the most conservative and least militant of the public employee unions; frequently it had used its influence within the Labour Party to frustrate left-wing challenges to the leadership, and its officials rarely faced contested elections for their positions. Faced with the growing threat from the National Union of Public Employees (NUPE) and the Confederation of Health Service Employees (COHSE), both of which were growing more quickly, it was trying not to be what members of those unions called the 'scab union'.

The ensuing strike, in Liverpool and in Tameside near Manchester, was later frequently referred to by Conservative politicians. With 80 gravediggers being on strike, Liverpool City Council hired a factory in Speke to store the corpses until they could be buried. The Department of Environment noted that there were 150 bodies stored at the factory at one point, with 25 more added every day. The reports of unburied bodies caused concern with the public. On 1 February a persistent journalist asked the Medical Officer of Health for Liverpool, Dr Duncan Bolton, what would be done if the strike continued for months, Bolton speculated that burial at sea would be considered. Although his response was hypothetical, in the circumstances it caused great alarm. Other alternatives were considered, including allowing the bereaved to dig their own funeral's graves, deploying troops, and engaging private contractors to inter the bodies. The main concerns were said to be aesthetic because bodies could be safely stored in heat-sealed bags for up to six weeks. Bolton later reported being "horrified" by the sensationalised reportage of the strike in the mass media. The gravediggers eventually settled for a 14 per cent rise after a fortnight off the job.

In their later memoirs, Callaghan and Healey both blamed NUPE for letting the strike go on as long as it did, as would Conservatives. While the Tameside gravediggers had been members of that union, those in the Liverpool area were GMWU.

=== Waste collectors ===
With many collectors having been on strike since 22 January, local authorities began to run out of space for storing waste and used local parks under their control. The Conservative controlled Westminster City Council used Leicester Square in the heart of London's West End for piles of rubbish and, as the Evening Standard reported, this attracted rats and the available food led to an increase in their numbers. The media nicknamed the area Fester Square.

On 21 February, a settlement of the local authority workers' dispute was agreed, whereby workers got an 11 per cent rise, plus £1 per week, with the possibility of extra rises, should a pay comparability study recommend them. Some left-wing local authorities, among them the London Borough of Camden, conceded the union demands in full (known as the "Camden surplus") and then saw an investigation by the District Auditor, which eventually ruled it a breach of the fiduciary duty owed to the ratepayers (local taxpayers) of the area and therefore illegal. Camden Borough councillors, among them Ken Livingstone, avoided surcharge. Livingstone was Leader of the Greater London Council at the time the decision not to impose a surcharge was made.

== End of the strikes ==
By the end of January 90,000 Britons were receiving unemployment benefit. There were no more major storms, but temperatures remained bitterly cold. Many remote communities still had not quite recovered from the snowstorm at the beginning of the month. A 40-mile (64 km) section of the M6 north of Walsall was closed to traffic, and many other roads, even near London, had enforced temporary speed limits as low as 20 miles per hour (32 km/h). Plans to have the Army grit the roads were abandoned when NUPE official Barry Shuttleworth threatened an expanded strike of public employees in response.

Strikes by essential services dismayed many senior ministers in the Labour government who had been close to the trade union movement, who had thought it unlikely that trade unionists would take such action. Among these was Prime Minister James Callaghan himself, who had built his political career on his connection to the trade unions, and had practically founded one, the Inland Revenue Staff Federation. Callaghan called the actions of the strikers "free collective vandalism".

The government was negotiating with the senior union leaders and on 11 February came to an agreement on a proposal to be put to the TUC General Council. On 14 February, as thaws in the weather began to seem possible, the General Council agreed the concordat, published under the title "The Economy, the Government, and Trade Union Responsibilities". (Note: The significance of a comprehensive agreement on Valentine's Day was remarked upon by the press) By this stage union executives had limited control over their members and strikes did not immediately cease, although they began to wind down from this point. In total in 1979, 29,474,000 working days were lost in industrial disputes, compared with 9,306,000 in 1978.

Storms in late February prolonged the isolation of the remote communities where roads had not been cleared yet. January 1979, with an average temperature of −1.4 °C (29.5 °F), was the seventeenth coldest January since records began to be kept in 1659; in the years since only two other winter months in Britain (February 1986 and December 2010) have had average temperatures below freezing. The −0.1 °C (31.8 °F) average for both January and February has not ever been equalled by another two-month period since. Overall, the winter of 1979 was the twenty-eighth coldest ever, but the third coldest of the 20th century.

== Effect on general election ==
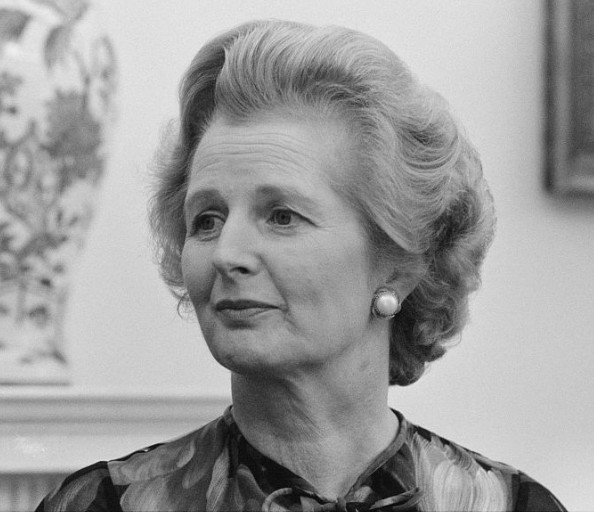
Margaret Thatcher, who won the 1979 general election and became Prime Minister

The strikes appeared to have a profound effect on voting intention. According to Gallup, Labour had a lead of 5 percentage points over the Conservatives in November 1978, which turned to a Conservative lead of 7.5 percentage points in January 1979, and of 20 percentage points in February. On 1 March, referendums on devolution to Scotland and Wales were held. That in Wales went strongly against devolution; that in Scotland produced a small majority in favour which did not reach the threshold set by Parliament of 40 per cent of that electorate. The government's decision not to press ahead with devolution immediately led the Scottish National Party to withdraw support from the government and on 28 March in a motion of no confidence the government lost by one vote, precipitating a general election.

Conservative Party leader Margaret Thatcher had already outlined her proposals for restricting trade union power in a party political broadcast on 17 January in the middle of the lorry drivers' strike. During the election campaign the Conservative Party made extensive use of the disruption caused during the strike. One broadcast on 23 April began with the Sun's headline "Crisis? What Crisis?" being shown and read out by an increasingly desperate voiceover interspersed with film footage of piles of rubbish, closed factories, picketed hospitals and locked graveyards. The scale of the Conservatives' victory in the general election has often been ascribed to the effect of the strikes, as well as their "Labour Isn't Working" campaign, and the party used film of the events of the winter in election campaigns for years to come.

== Legacy ==
Following Thatcher's election win, she brought the post-war consensus to a halt and made drastic changes to trade union laws (most notably the regulation that unions had to hold a ballot among members before calling strikes) and as a result strikes were at their lowest level for 30 years by the time of the 1983 general election, which the Conservatives won by a landslide.

American historian Tara Martin López has noted how many later memories of the Winter of Discontent exaggerate what occurred and confuse events of that time with other industrial disputes and their consequences during the 1970s. In The Filth and the Fury, a 2000 documentary about punk rock band the Sex Pistols, surviving members Steve Jones and John Lydon recall 1975, around the time of the band's founding, for "a garbage strike that went on for years and years and there was trash piled ten-foot high". One of López's own students in her classes at the University of Manchester identified the Winter of Discontent with the three-day week, which had actually been implemented during the 1974 miners' strike. She wrote: "The embeddedness of a memory infused with a mix of errors, political fact and evocative images is particularly interesting in understanding the Winter of Discontent because it intimates the broader historical significance of this series of events."

=== Within the Labour Party ===
The Winter of Discontent also had effects within the Labour Party. Callaghan was succeeded as leader by the more left-wing Michael Foot, who did not succeed in unifying the party. In 1981, still believing the party to have been too firmly controlled by the unions, William Rodgers, the former transport minister who had tried to mitigate the effect of the hauliers' strike, left with three dozen other disaffected Labourites to form the more centrist Social Democratic Party (SDP), a decision he recalls reaching with some difficulty. Similarly disillusioned, especially after a GMWU official assured him "we'll call the shots" after the winter ended, Tom McNally, Callaghan's advisor who had recommended the news conference that produced The Sun's "Crisis? What Crisis?" headline, left Labour for the SDP.

Some of the union officials involved, conversely, never changed their positions on the strikes. In 2006 Rodney Bickerstaffe, later general secretary of NUPE and its successor UNISON, said: "I would have to say if we had to do it all over again today, I would do it all over again". Ian Lowes, leader of the Liverpool gravediggers, concurred: "We had no choice". After the strikes, feeling betrayed by government denunciations of the strikers, he, too, moved away from the Labour Party—but further left. He found himself agreeing with the Trotskyist positions of The Militant newspaper distributed to strikers, and soon formally joined the local branch of the Militant Tendency, leaving them six years later when the Liverpool City Council, controlled by Militant, followed local governments across Britain in contracting out work normally done by government workers.

During the 1997 general election, with the Conservatives the besieged incumbent party, Conservative campaign operatives began claiming that Labour, once back in power, would again take its direction from the TUC and repeal all the laws Thatcher had passed to curb the tactics unions had used in 1979. Labour leader Tony Blair wrote an opinion piece for The Times denying all those charges and explaining that Labour had no plans to allow unballoted strikes, secondary pickets or closed shops, among other things, again. "I have staked my political reputation and credibility on making it clear that there will be no return to the 1970s", he wrote. "Indeed there is little appetite among trade unions for such a thing."

=== Response by the British left ===
After Labour's steep losses, including many seats the party had held for decades, in the 2019 election, during which Conservatives had again linked left-wing party leader Jeremy Corbyn to the 1970s and the Winter of Discontent, Matt Myers wrote in Jacobin that the British left had, by ceding to the right its narrative of that era, failed to confront "neoliberalism's founding myth, [which] continues to place a fundamental obstacle in the way of socialist advance in Britain ... The defeats of the 1970s have been internalized—even by those that had once been the most powerful counterforces to neoliberalism." This in his opinion came despite Labour's hold on the youth vote, much more in its favour than it had been in 1983, when voters aged 18–24 preferred Thatcher. The corresponding overwhelming lead of the Tories among older voters, whom he described as "passive beneficiaries of socialist transformation", in Labour's view, rather than "active subjects" made it easy for the right to appeal to their desire to protect the much greater wealth they had accumulated compared to the country's youth by evoking the 1970s.

Some leftists have joined the criticism of labour actions during the Winter of Discontent. Paul Foot, a lifelong socialist, described the strikes as "bloody-minded expressions of revenge and self-interest". John Kelly, another left-leaning academic, wrote that they were "an example of an almost purely economistic and defensive militancy".

Recognising the era's endurance as an albatross around Labour's neck, some leftists have attempted to rehabilitate the Winter of Discontent as the inevitable result of the Callaghan government's incomes policy. "[It] hardly fell out of a clear blue sky; rather, it was the culmination of a long series of strikes and struggles against drastic attacks on workers' standards of living", Sheila Cohen wrote for The Commune in 2010. Red Pepper, in a page on its website devoted to refuting the Tory narrative of the 1970s, echoes this and further blames the Bank of England's loosening of credit restrictions during and after the Heath government as driving inflation so high, rather than union pay demands; it also attributes the economic rebound under Thatcher to the revenues from North Sea oil instead of her labour law reforms.

Cohen also saw the Winter as having offended the ruling class through its demonstration of working-class power. "These prosaic struggles of tanker drivers, gravediggers and dustmen also displayed the only power that workers can have; they withdrew their labour, with a force and to an extent that seriously challenged the organisation and structure of society." Two years later, in the wake of the Great Recession and the austerity measures introduced by Conservative Prime Minister David Cameron, who had succeeded Brown at the 2010 election, Nick Cohen was not so sure that the strikes of 1979, which he agreed were the last time the working class was able to inconvenience the wealthy, should be remembered so badly: "With organised labour now emasculated, managers and owners can reward themselves without restraint and governments can stagger from blunder to blunder without a thought for those who must suffer the consequences."

=== As 21st-century Conservative talking point ===
In 2008, another Times piece raised the spectre of the Winter of Discontent in warning Labour, then in government with Gordon Brown as prime minister, not to allow the TUC to set the party's agenda again. Militant union rhetoric at the party's 2008 conference, Rachel Sylvester wrote, made it "a quaint but rather pointless vision of the past: Jurassic Park with an Abba soundtrack, a T-rex dressed in flares." Five years later, at the first Margaret Thatcher Annual Lecture given after her death, Boris Johnson lamented that British youth were getting an overwhelmingly negative impression of the late prime minister from "Russell Brand and the BBC" that those old enough to remember what came before her election did not. "[In 1979] Red Robbo [i.e. Derek Robinson] paralyzed what was left of our car industry and the country went into an ecstasy of uselessness called the winter of discontent: women were forced to give birth by candle-light, Prime Minister's Questions was lit by paraffin lamp and Blue Peter was all about how to put newspaper in blankets for extra insulation." Two years later, with another election looming, Johnson again said that Ed Miliband, Labour's then-leader, would take Britain back to the 1970s if he became prime minister.

After losing that election, Miliband was succeeded as Labour leader by Jeremy Corbyn, a surprise winner of the leadership election identified with the left wing of the party, who had been a NUPE activist before his election to Parliament in 1983; he was popular among younger voters. In the 2017 general election, the first contested with him as leader, the party did better than expected, gaining 30 seats, its first seat gains in 20 years. Daily Telegraph columnist Philip Johnston attributed this to Conservatives' failure to use the Winter of Discontent against Corbyn as an example for his youthful base of what his policies would likely lead to a repeat of. "It appears that the economic arguments we had as a nation in the Eighties will have to be joined all over again."

Two years later, in The Independent, Sean O'Grady recalled his experience of that winter, as a child. While conceding that some memories of it exaggerated its severity, "[t]here was a mood in the country that we couldn't carry on like this" and thus Thatcher was elected. O'Grady warned readers that if reforms to labour laws that her government had enacted in the wake of the Winter of Discontent were repealed, in addition with the enactment of legislation desired by unions to make it easier to organize, Britain could see a repeat of 1979. "We learned hard lessons about this sort of thing in that exceptionally cold and harsh winter of 1978–79", he wrote. "Don't let Britain have to learn those painful lessons again, the hard way."

"When deployed by the Right against the Left 'the 1970s' is a malleable field to which all the worst elements of the nation's past are consigned", Myers observed in Jacobin. Yet, "the more the specter of 'the 1970s' is raised in British political discourse, the less the reality of the past is actually discussed ... For modern British Conservatism, the 1970s can thus serve as an empty signifier, its power dependent on eternal repetition of a memory from which even those who lived it are excluded."

== See also ==
- United States strike wave of 1945–1946, in U.S., followed by the election of conservative Republican majorities in Congress who also passed laws restricting union activities
- 1981 air traffic controllers strike, ended when President Ronald Reagan fired thousands of striking controllers, and seen as setting the tone for more aggressive posture with unions by U.S. corporations
- 1983 Arizona copper mine strike, resulted in the company hiring permanent replacements and breaking the union, first of many setbacks for major American unions that decade
- 1984–1985 United Kingdom miners' strike, largely seen as a victory for Thatcher's government over union militancy
- Winter of 1946–47 in the United Kingdom
- 1970s commodities boom

== Bibliography ==
- Beckett, Andy (2009). When the Lights Went Out: Britain in the Seventies. 576pp. Excerpt and text search.
- Butler, David; Kavanagh, Dennis (1979). The British General Election of 1979. London: Macmillan. ISBN 0-333-26934-9.
- Hay, Colin (2009). "The Winter of Discontent Thirty Years On". The Political Quarterly. 80 (4): 545–552. doi:10.1111/j.1467-923X.2009.02052.x.
- Harrison, Brian (2011). Finding a Role?: The United Kingdom 1970–1990 (New Oxford History of England). Excerpt and text search; online. Major scholarly survey.
- Secret History: Winter of Discontent. Mentorn Productions for Channel Four (1998).
- Moore, Charles (2014). Margaret Thatcher: The Authorized Biography: Volume 1. London: Penguin. ISBN 978-0-140-27956-6.
- Rodgers, William (1984). "Government under Stress: Britain's Winter of Discontent 1979". The Political Quarterly. 55 (2): 171–179. doi:10.1111/j.1467-923X.1984.tb02595.x.
- Seldon, Anthony, ed. (2004). New Labour, Old Labour: The Wilson and Callaghan Governments 1974–79. London: Routledge. ISBN 0-415-31281-7.
- Shepherd, John (2013). Crisis? What Crisis?: The Callaghan Government and the British Winter of Discontent. Manchester: Manchester University Press. ISBN 978-0-7190-8247-4.
- Thomas, James (2007). "'Bound in by history': The Winter of Discontent in British politics, 1979–2004". Media, Culture & Society. 29 (2): 263–283. doi:10.1177/0163443707074257. S2CID 145626459.
- Turner, Alwyn W. (2009). Crisis? What Crisis?: Britain in the 1970s. 336pp. Excerpt and text search.
