= John Hoskyns (policy advisor) =

British businessman (1927–2014)

Sir John Hoskyns

Director of Number 10 Policy Unit
- In office May 1979 – April 1982
- Prime Minister: Margaret Thatcher
- Preceded by: Bernard Donoughue
- Succeeded by: Ferdinand Mount

Personal details
- Born: John Leigh Austin Hungerford Hoskyns; 23 August 1927 Farnborough, Hampshire
- Died: 20 October 2014 (aged 87) Suffolk
- Spouse(s): Miranda, Lady Hoskyns (nee Mott), m. 1956
- Children: 3
- Relatives: Benedict Hoskyns; Chandos Hoskyns
- Education: Winchester College

Military service
- Allegiance: United Kingdom
- Branch/service: British Army
- Years of service: 1945–1957
- Rank: Captain
- Unit: Rifle Brigade

Sir John Leigh Austin Hungerford Hoskyns (23 August 1927 – 20 October 2014) was best known as a Policy Advisor to Margaret Thatcher while head of the Prime Minister's Policy Unit from May 1979 to April 1982. Before this, he acted as a policy adviser to her and the Shadow Cabinet from 1975 to 1979, during which time he produced, together with Norman Strauss, a business executive from Unilever, the important "Stepping Stones" report of November 1977.

== Early life ==
Hoskyns was born in Farnborough, Hampshire, the son of an army officer, Chandos Hoskyns.

One grandfather, Benedict Hoskyns, was a Church of England clergyman, Dean of Christchurch and Archdeacon of Chichester.

The other grandfather, Austin Taylor (1858–1955), was a Conservative, later Liberal, politician, who in 1906 changed his party allegiance from Conservative to Liberal over the issue of free trade, alongside Winston Churchill.

Hoskyns's father was killed during the Siege of Calais in 1940, when Hoskyns was aged twelve. He was educated at Winchester College, Hampshire, a leading independent boarding school. In 1945, aged seventeen, he was commissioned into the Rifle Brigade, serving until 1957 and rising to the rank of Captain.

== Business career ==
On leaving the army in 1957, Hoskyns started a business career, joining IBM. In 1964, he founded the Hoskyns Group, an information technology services company in which he was chairman and managing director until 1975. He was Director-General of the Institute of Directors (1984–89) and served on the boards of several public companies.

== Stepping Stones Report, 1977 ==
Without any political experience, Hoskyns dedicated most of 1977 to analysing what was wrong with Britain. This work formed a large part of the "Stepping Stones Report", published together with Norman S. Strauss, a business executive from Unilever, in November 1977, created for the Conservative Party, then in opposition. The report included a diagram showing how the problems it identified were interlinked.

Hoskyns and Strauss claimed that trade union power increases unemployment, raising wages above market-clearing levels, which will eventually cause wages to be unsustainably and inefficiently high. This encourages politicians to run budget deficits and print money; this causes inflation, which makes unions more militant, as their members suffer under increased inflation, and also, workers will be more inclined to join unions for protection from the rising inflation. Thus, trade union power increases as the unions gain members. The report states: 'The one precondition for success will be a complete change in the role of the trade unions movement'. When Margaret Thatcher, who had read chemistry at Oxford, saw the diagram, she reportedly remarked that it looked like a chemical plant.

Thatcher admired Hoskyns, writing in her autobiography that "John's background was in business and computers, but over and above that experience, he had strong powers of analysis and had helped formulate our economic strategy in Opposition. He propagated the theory that a 'culture of decline' was the ultimate cause of many of Britain's economic problems... He kept our eye on the ball."

== After Downing Street ==
In March 1982, Hoskyns resigned from the Central Policy Review Staff (CPRS), frustrated by the slow pace of change, including the refusal to appoint certain people to the CPRS, because it was a non-political body. He was knighted in the 1982 Birthday Honours. Hoskyns became director general of the Institute of Directors from 1984 to 1989, strongly expressing views on current political matters.

He became chairman of the Burton Group in 1990, and, with former Thatcherite allies, he campaigned against the single European currency. In 2000, he published a memoir, Just in Time: Inside the Thatcher Revolution.

Hoskyns was interviewed about Stepping Stones and the rise of Thatcherism in Episode 2 of the 2006 BBC TV documentary series Tory! Tory! Tory!

In 2006, Hoskyns attacked the European Union's "out-of-touch politicians, undemocratic institutions, dubious electoral systems and legal processes, financial corruption, creative accounting, secrecy, administrative incompetence, mercantilist instincts, foreign-policy confusion, institutionalised animosity towards the United States and Charlemagne-flavoured delusions of empire."

== Personal life ==
In 1956 Hoskyns married Miranda Mott, and they had two sons and a daughter.

He died at home in Suffolk on 20 October 2014 and was buried in the churchyard of St Mary the Virgin, Edwardstone.

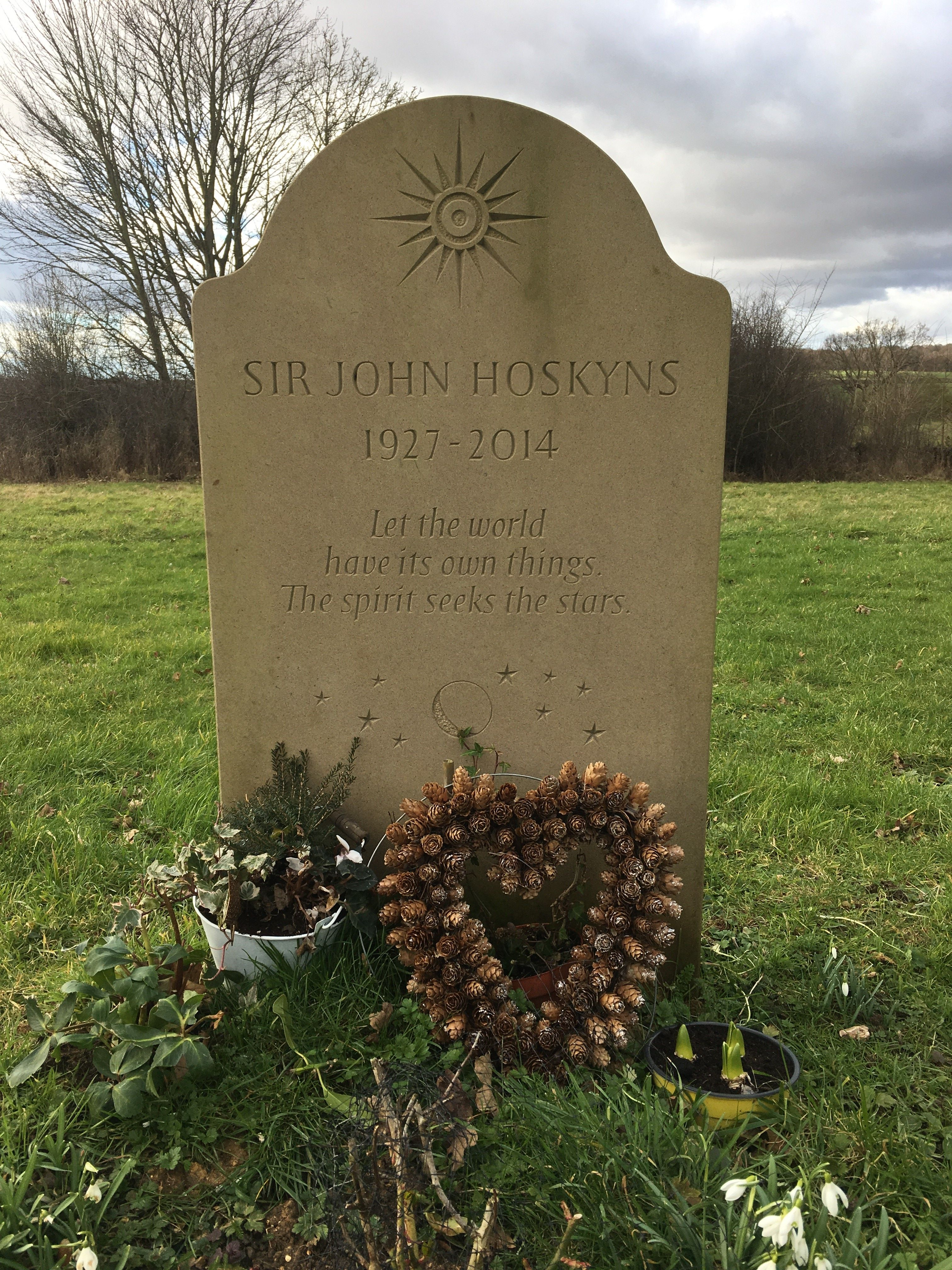
The grave of Hoskyns in Edwardstone churchyard

== Legacy ==
Hoskyns is reported to have been an inspiration for Dominic Cummings, adviser to some government ministers since 2011, and an influential adviser to Prime Minister Boris Johnson from 2019. Cummings wrote in 2015, "The best book I have read by someone who has worked in No 10 … is John Hoskyns' [memoir] Just In Time. Extremely unusually for someone in a senior position in No 10, Hoskyns both had an intellectual understanding of complex systems and was a successful manager."

== 30-year rule and official documents ==
At the end of 2011, the release of confidential documents under the UK Government's 30-year rule revealed Hoskyns' thoughts regarding the Liverpool Riots. He saw little point in spending more money on Liverpool, saying "this money is likely to be money wasted".

== See also ==
- Free Market
- New Right

Government offices
Preceded by Bernard Donoughue	Number 10 Policy Unit; 1979–1982	Succeeded by Ferdinand Mount
