= Benedict Hoskyns =

Benedict George Hoskyns (23 February 1856 – 11 September 1935) was an Anglican priest in the first third of the 20th century.

He was born on 23 February 1856 into an ennobled family: his father was Canon Sir John Leigh Hoskyns, 9th Bart. He was educated at Bradfield, Haileybury and Jesus College, Cambridge, where he graduated BA in 1878. He rowed in the 1877 Boat Race, notable for being the only dead heat in the race's history.

He was ordained in 1880 and was Curate of St Mary's, Southampton until 1888. He was then Vicar of St Denys in the same city until 1895, and also Chaplain to the 2nd Volunteer Battalion, Hampshire Regiment. After this he was a Canon Residentiary at Truro Cathedral and Diocesan Missioner until February 1902, when he was appointed Vicar of Brighton (and Chaplain to the 1st Sussex. Royal Garrison Artillery Volunteers). He was then Archdeacon of Hastings from 1915 until 1920. He was Archdeacon of Chichester from 1920 to 1934 and a Residentiary Canon at its cathedral. He died on 11 September 1935.

His grandson, Sir John Leigh Austin Hungerford Hoskyns was head of the Prime Minister's Policy Unit from 1979 until 1982.

== Notes ==
Church of England titles
Preceded by Theodore Townson Churton	Archdeacon of Hastings; 1915 – 1920	Succeeded by Arthur William Upcott
Preceded by Herbert Edward Jones	Archdeacon of Chichester; 1920 – 1934	Succeeded by Charles Philip Stewart Clarke
