= Arthur Upcott =

English archdeacon

The Ven Arthur William Upcott , DD, MA (6 January 1857 – 22 May 1922) was an Anglican priest and educationalist.

He was born in Cullompton on 6 January 1857 and educated at Sherborne and Exeter College, Oxford. Ordained in 1886, he was Chaplain then Head Master of St Mark's School, Windsor until 1891. He held two further headships: St Edmund's School, Canterbury (1891–1902); and Christ's Hospital ( 1902–1919).

He was Rector of Brightling and Archdeacon of Hastings from 1920 until his death on 22 May 1922.

== Notes ==
Church of England titles
Preceded by Benedict George Hoskyns	Archdeacon of Hastings; 1920 – 1922	Succeeded by Thomas William Cook
