= Dennis Talbot (British Army officer) =

British Army general (1908–1994)

Major-General Dennis Talbot CB CBE DSO MC
- Born: 23 September 1908; Norwood, Middlesex, England
- Died: 27 June 1994 (aged 85); Barham, Kent, England
- Military career
- Allegiance: United Kingdom
- Branch: British Army
- Service years: 1928−1964
- Rank: Major-General
- Service number: 40702
- Unit: Queen's Own Royal West Kent Regiment
- Commands: 7th Battalion, Royal Hampshire Regiment; 2nd Battalion, Queen's Own Royal West Kent Regiment; 18th Infantry Brigade; 99th Gurkha Infantry Brigade; East Anglian District; Rhine Army Troops, Germany
- Conflicts: Malayan Emergency; Second World War
- Awards: Companion of the Order of the Bath; Commander of the Order of the British Empire; Distinguished Service Order; Military Cross

Major-General Dennis Edmund Blaquiere Talbot, CB, CBE, DSO, MC (23 September 1908 – 27 June 1994) was a British Army officer.

== Military career ==
Educated at Tonbridge School and the Royal Military College, Sandhurst, Talbot was commissioned into the Queen's Own Royal West Kent Regiment in 1928. The first few years of his military career were spent with his regiment in India before returning to the United Kingdom where he commanded the Queen's Own Royal West Kent Regimental Depot.

After attending and later graduating from a shortened course at the Staff College, Camberley, from January to April 1940, he was made a brigade major of the 30th Infantry Brigade, commanded by Brigadier Claude Nicholson. The brigade was deployed to France in May and, despite fighting bravely against overwhelming odds at the siege of Calais, was mostly captured by German troops. Talbot managed to escape, however, crossing the English Channel and landing at Dover. After briefly serving as brigade major of the 47th (London) Infantry Division's 141st (5th London) Brigade, he then served at Combined Operations Headquarters in from 1941 to 1944, he became Commanding Officer of the 7th Battalion, the Hampshire Regiment, part of the 43rd (Wessex) Infantry Division, in North West Europe.

After the war, he became commanding officer of the 2nd Battalion, the Queen's Own Royal West Kent Regiment in the British Army of the Rhine (BAOR) in 1945 and attended the Royal Naval College, Greenwich the following year. He was then commander of the 18th Infantry Brigade in Malaya in October 1953 during the Malayan Emergency and then commander of 99th Gurkha Infantry Brigade also in Malaya in March 1955. After attending the Imperial Defence College, he went on to be General Officer Commanding East Anglian District in June 1958, Deputy Commander, British Army of the Rhine and Commander British Army Group Troops, Germany in April 1961 and Chief of Staff, British Army of the Rhine and General Officer Commanding Rhine Army Troops, Germany in 1963 before he retired in 1964.

== Family ==
In 1939, he married Barbara Pyper; they had three sons and two daughters.

Military offices
Preceded by Reginald Harding	GOC East Anglian District; 1958–1961	Succeeded by Ian Freeland
