= Ronald Cooke =

Ronald Cooke may refer to:

- Ronald Cooke (British Army officer) (1899–1971), British general
- Sir Ron Cooke (born 1941), an English professor of geography and geomorphology
- Ronnie Cooke, a South African rugby union player
