= Temple Gurdon =

Temple Gurdon may refer to:

- Edward Temple Gurdon (1854–1929), British rugby player
- Temple Gurdon (British Army officer) (1896–1959), British General
