= Reginald Harding =

British Army general (1905–1981)

Major-General Reginald Harding CB DSO
- Born: 3 July 1905
- Died: 27 December 1981 (aged 76)
- Military career
- Allegiance: United Kingdom
- Branch: British Army
- Service years: 1925–1958
- Rank: Major-General
- Service number: 31957
- Unit: 5th Royal Inniskilling Dragoon Guards
- Commands: 7th Armoured Brigade; Royal Armoured Corps Centre; 49th (West Riding) Armoured Division; East Anglian District
- Conflicts: Second World War
- Awards: Companion of the Order of the Bath; Distinguished Service Order

Major-General Reginald Peregrine Harding, CB, DSO (3 July 1905 – 27 December 1981) was a British Army officer.

== Military career ==
After graduating from the Royal Military College, Sandhurst, Harding was commissioned into the 5th/6th Dragoons on 29 January 1925. He was appointed a Companion of the Distinguished Service Order in the 1940 Birthday Honours for his services in the Second World War.

After the war, in October 1946, he became commander of 22nd Armoured Brigade which was re-designated 7th Armoured Brigade in January 1947; he then became Commandant of the Royal Armoured Corps Centre at Bovington Camp in August 1949. He went on to be General Officer Commanding 49th (West Riding) Armoured Division in December 1951 and General Officer Commanding East Anglian District in May 1955 before retiring in June 1958.

He was appointed a Companion of the Order of the Bath in the 1953 Coronation Honours.

In 1933, as an amateur jockey, he won the National Hunt Chase Challenge Cup on a horse known as "Ego" which had been trained by Lieutenant Colonel Morgan Lindsay.

Military offices
Preceded by Ronald Cooke	GOC 49th (West Riding) Armoured Division; 1951–1954	Succeeded by Ralph Younger
Preceded by Roger Bower	GOC East Anglian District; 1955–1958	Succeeded by Dennis Talbot
