= George Richards (British Army officer) =

British Army officer

Major-General George Richards CB CBE DSO* MC
- Born: 4 July 1898
- Died: 23 February 1978 (aged 79)
- Military career
- Allegiance: United Kingdom
- Branch: British Army
- Service years: 1916–1948
- Rank: Major-General
- Service number: 15298
- Units: Royal Welch Fusiliers; Machine Gun Corps; Royal Tank Regiment
- Commands: North Midlands District (1947–49); 49th (West Riding) Armoured Division (1947–49); 53rd (Welsh) Infantry Division (1946–47); 23rd Armoured Brigade (1942–43); 4th Armoured Brigade (1941–42); 49th Royal Tank Regiment (1940–41)
- Conflicts: First World War; Second World War
- Awards: Companion of the Order of the Bath; Commander of the Order of the British Empire; Distinguished Service Order & Bar; Military Cross; Mentioned in Despatches

Major-General George Warren Richards, CB, CBE, DSO & Bar, MC (4 July 1898 – 23 February 1978) was a British Army officer.

== Military career ==
After graduating from the Royal Military College, Sandhurst, Richards was commissioned into the Royal Welch Fusiliers on 16 August 1916. Attached to the Machine Gun Corps, he saw action at the Battle of Aleppo in October 1918 in the Middle Eastern theatre of the First World War. In 1918 he was awarded the Military Cross.

Remaining in the army during the interwar period, Richards transferred to the Royal Tank Corps (later the Royal Tank Regiment) in 1920 and was adjutant of the 4th Battalion, RTC in 1928. He married two years later. He attended the Staff College, Camberley from 1934 to 1935 and was then a senior instructor at the Tank School, Bovington, from 1939 to 1940.

Richards became commanding officer of the 49th Royal Tank Regiment at Catterick Garrison in Yorkshire in August 1940. In early 1941 he was sent to North Africa where he served as a staff officer with the 7th Armoured Division during Operations 'Battleaxe' and 'Crusader'. He was then promoted to Brigadier and given command of 4th Armoured Brigade in December 1941, and saw action at the Battle of Gazala in May 1942. He then became Commander of the 1st Army Tank Brigade in July 1942 and took part in the First Battle of Alamein later that month. After that he became commander of 23rd Armoured Brigade in August 1942 and commanded his brigade at the Second Battle of El Alamein in October 1942. He then became Major-General Royal Armoured Corps for 21st Army Group in 1944 and took part in the Normandy landings and the advance into North West Europe.

After the war Richards became General Officer Commanding the 53rd (Welsh) Infantry Division in June 1946 and General Officer Commanding 49th (West Riding) Armoured Division in January 1947 before retiring in December 1948.

Richards retired to Abergavenny and was a deputy lieutenant for Monmouthshire in 1965.

== Bibliography ==
- Smart, Nick (2005). Biographical Dictionary of British Generals of the Second World War. Barnesley: Pen & Sword. ISBN 1844150496.

Military offices
Preceded by Francis Matthews	GOC 53rd (Welsh) Infantry Division; 1946–1947	Succeeded by Philip Balfour
Preceded by Temple Gurdon	GOC 49th (West Riding) Armoured Division; 1947–1948	Succeeded by Ronald Cooke
