= Claude Nicholson (British Army officer) =

British Army officer (1898–1943)

Brigadier Claude Nicholson CB
- Born: 2 July 1898; Chelsea, London, England
- Died: 26 June 1943 (aged 44); Rotenburg an der Fulda, Germany
- Military career
- Allegiance: United Kingdom
- Branch: British Army
- Service years: 1916–1943
- Rank: Brigadier
- Service number: 15479
- Unit: 16th The Queen's Lancers
- Commands: 30th Infantry Brigade (1940); 16th/5th The Queen's Royal Lancers (1938–1939)
- Conflicts: First World War; Second World War: Siege of Calais
- Awards: Companion of the Order of the Bath

Claude Nicholson, CB (2 July 1898 – 26 June 1943) was a British Army officer who fought in the First World War and commanded the defence at the Siege of Calais in the Second World War.

== Early life and military career ==
Claude Nicholson was the elder son of Richard Francis Nicholson, a distiller from Hampshire, and was born on 2 July 1898 in Chelsea, London. He was educated at Winchester College and in 1915 entered the Royal Military College, Sandhurst. On being commissioned as an officer in 1916, he served with the 16th Lancers in France and Belgium during the First World War. He later served in Palestine, India and Egypt. After attending the Staff College, Camberley, from 1928 to 1929, he served at the War Office from 1930 to 1931 and then commanded cadets at the Royal Military College. He was promoted to brevet major in 1934. On 31 December 1935, he married Ursula Katherine Hanbury-Tracy.

In 1938, Nicholson was promoted to lieutenant colonel and taught at the Staff College, Camberley, and then commanded his regiment, the 16th/5th Lancers, in India from 1938 to 1939.

== Second World War ==
Following the outbreak of the Second World War, Nicholson was given command of the 30th Infantry Brigade, which was raised on 20 April 1940 to serve in Norway. Dennis Talbot, later a major general, was Nicholson's brigade major. Nicholson's brigade left Dover and reached Calais on 23 May 1940 to keep the Calais port open and relieve the defenders at the Battle of Boulogne. With the German advance, that became impossible and Nicholson held Calais.

The Germans advanced on the town and laid siege to it, shelling the town and drawing closer. This was just before the start of Operation Dynamo, the evacuation of the British Expeditionary Force (BEF) through Dunkirk. The next day, Nicholson was told that his brigade might be evacuated back to Britain. As the large German force fought through the town the same day, Nicholson ordered a staged withdrawal from the ramparts to more easily defensible places in the city, such as the Citadel and the Gare Maritime, a train station. On the morning of 25 May, the Germans sent the mayor of Calais to Nicholson to ask him to surrender, saying that if he did not, they would bomb and shell the town until it was razed. Nicholson said: "Surrender? No, I shall not surrender. Tell the Germans that if they want Calais they will have to fight for it." The Germans resumed their fire. Soon after, Nicholson received a telegram from Anthony Eden, Secretary of War: "Defence of Calais is of vital importance to our country and BEF and as showing our continued co-operation with France. The eyes of the whole Empire are upon the defence of Calais, and His Majesty’s government is confident that you and your gallant regiments will perform an exploit worthy of the British name." He received and refused another offer to surrender from the Germans: "The answer is no, as it is the British Army’s duty to fight as well as it is the Germans'." Nicholson continued visiting the troops at the front lines. That night, Winston Churchill telegrammed Nicholson:

Every hour you continue to exist is of the greatest help to the BEF. Government has therefore decided that you must continue to fight. Have greatest possible admiration for your splendid stand. Evacuation will not (repeat not) take place, and craft required for above purpose are to return to Dover.

Churchill later wrote that he felt physically sick after sending the telegram. On 26 May, the German barrage continued and in the afternoon, the Germans broke through, taking Nicholson and many soldiers prisoner. He was taken to a prisoner camp near Salzburg, then later to one in Hesse.

On 4 June 1940, Churchill spoke to Parliament about Nicholson's defence:

The Rifle Brigade, the 60th Rifles and the Queen Victoria’s Rifles, with a battalion of British tanks and one thousand Frenchmen – in all about four thousand strong – defended Calais to the last. The British Brigadier was given an hour to surrender. He spurned the offer, and four days of intense street fighting passed before silence reigned over Calais, which marked the end of a memorable resistance. Only thirty un-wounded survivors were brought off by the Royal Navy, and we do not know the fate of their comrades. Their sacrifice was not however in vain. At least two armoured divisions, which otherwise would have been turned against the British Expeditionary Force, had to be sent to overcome them. They have added another page to the glories of the Light Division and the time gained enabled the Gravelines Walnlieu to be flooded and to be held by French troops; and thus it was that the port of Dunkirk was kept open.

Nicholson was appointed a Companion of the Order of the Bath for his services at Calais in 1940.

== Katyn incident ==
While imprisoned, Nicholson was asked to be an independent witness that the Germans did not perpetrate the Katyn massacre, where around 20,000 Polish officers and intelligentsia were killed by the Soviets. Nicholson, the senior British officer at his camp, and the senior American officer, Colonel John H. Van Vliet Jr (later the author of the "Van Vliet report" implicating the Soviets in the massacre), refused, not wanting to be part of a German propaganda effort. Van Vliet and another American officer were later forced to go.

== Death ==
Nicholson died in captivity in 1943, in the German city of Rotenburg an der Fulda where he was kept as a prisoner of war. According to his death certificate, he threw himself out of a window after suffering from depression, suffering a skull fracture. He was taken to the city hospital, where he died in the early morning hours of 26 June; he was buried at Rotenburg Civil Cemetery. His date of death is given as 26 or 27 June in his obituary in The Times. His family and fellow officers in the camp dispute the cause of death.

== Historical reaction ==
In 1949, Churchill wrote that the defence of Calais led by Nicholson delayed the German attack on Dunkirk, helping to save the British Expeditionary Force, a claim that German General Heinz Guderian contradicted in 1951. In 1966, Lionel Ellis, the British official historian, wrote that three panzer divisions had been diverted by the defence of Boulogne and Calais, giving the Allies time to rush troops to close a gap west of Dunkirk. In 2006, Karl-Heinz Frieser wrote that the halt order issued to the German unit commanders because of the Anglo-French attack at the Battle of Arras (21 May) had a greater effect than the siege. Hitler and the higher German commanders panicked because of their fears of flank attacks, when the real danger was of the Allies retreating to the coast before they could be cut off. Reinforcements sent from Britain to Boulogne and Calais arrived in time to forestall the Germans and hold them off when they advanced again on 22 May.

== Portrayal ==
Nicholson is portrayed by Richard Glover in the film Darkest Hour (2017) about Winston Churchill during the War Cabinet Crisis in 1940. In the film, Churchill orders Nicholson to hold out and delay the Germans so that the bulk of the British Expeditionary Force can be evacuated from Dunkirk. Churchill's dictating of the telegram, and Nicholson's receipt of this communication in his bunker defences, feature as notable scenes in the film.
