= Siege of Calais (1940) =

1940 battle during the Nazi German invasion of France

- Part of The Battle of France
- The Battle of France, situation 21 May – 4 June 1940
Date	22–26 May 1940
Location	Calais, France 50°57′22″N 1°50′29″E
Result	German victory

Belligerents
United Kingdom; France; Belgium	Germany

Commanders and leaders
(United Kingdom) Claude Nicholson (POW) (France) Charles de Lambertye † (France) Raymond Le Tellier (POW)	(Nazi Germany) Ferdinand Schaal

Strength
c. 4,000 men 40 tanks	1 panzer division

Casualties and losses
POW: 3,500 British; 16,000 French, Belgian and Dutch	
- Calais in Northern France, a sub-prefecture of the department of Pas-de-Calais

The siege of Calais (1940) was a battle for the port of Calais during the Battle of France. The siege was fought at the same time as the Battle of Boulogne, just before Operation Dynamo, the evacuation of the British Expeditionary Force (BEF) through Dunkirk. After the Franco-British counter-attack at the Battle of Arras (21 May), German units were held back to be ready to resist a resumption of the counter-attack on 22 May, despite the protests of General Heinz Guderian, the commander of the XIX Armee Korps, who wanted to rush north up the Channel coast to capture Boulogne, Calais and Dunkirk. An attack by part of the XIX Armee Korps was not authorised until 12:40 a.m. on the night of 21/22 May.

By the time the 10th Panzer Division was ready to attack Calais, the British 30th Infantry Brigade and 3rd Royal Tank Regiment (3rd RTR) had reinforced the French and British troops in the port. On 22 May, the British troops had established roadblocks outside the town and French rearguards skirmished with German armoured units, as they advanced towards Calais. British tanks and infantry had been ordered south to reinforce Boulogne but were too late. They then received orders to escort a food convoy to Dunkirk but found the road blocked by German troops. On 23 May, the British began to retire to the old Calais walls (built in the 1670s) and on 24 May, the siege began. The attacks by the 10th Panzer Division were mostly costly failures and by evening, the Germans reported that about half their tanks had been knocked out and a third of the infantry were casualties. The German attacks were supported by the Luftwaffe, while the Allied defenders were supported by their navies delivering supplies, evacuating wounded and bombarding German targets around the port.

On the night of 24/25 May, the defenders were forced to withdraw from the southern enceinte, to a line covering the Old Town and Citadel; attacks next day against this shorter line were repulsed. The Germans tried several times to persuade the garrison to surrender but orders had been received from London to hold out, because an evacuation had been forbidden by the French commander of the northern ports. More German attacks early on 26 May failed and the German commander was given an ultimatum that if Calais was not captured by 2:00 p.m., the attackers would be pulled back and the town levelled by the Luftwaffe. The Anglo-French defences began to collapse in the early afternoon and at 4:00 p.m. the order "every man for himself" was given to the defenders, as Le Tellier, the French commander surrendered. Next day, small naval craft entered the harbour and lifted about 400 men, while aircraft of the RAF and Fleet Air Arm dropped supplies and attacked German artillery emplacements.

In 1949, Churchill wrote that the defence of Calais delayed the German attack on Dunkirk, helping to save the 300,000 soldiers of the BEF, a claim that Guderian contradicted in 1951. In 1966, Lionel Ellis, the British official historian, wrote that three panzer divisions had been diverted by the defence of Boulogne and Calais, giving the Allies time to rush troops to close a gap west of Dunkirk. In 2006, Karl-Heinz Frieser wrote that the halt order issued to the German unit commanders because of the Anglo-French attack at the Battle of Arras had a greater effect than the siege. Hitler and the higher German commanders panicked because of their fears of flank attacks, when the real danger was of the Allies retreating to the coast before they could be cut off. Reinforcements sent from Britain to Boulogne and Calais arrived in time to forestall the Germans and hold them off when they advanced again on 22 May.

== Background ==
=== Calais ===
Topography south of Calais

The term Channel Ports refers to Calais, Boulogne and Dunkirk (and sometimes Ostend in Belgium). The ports are the nearest to Cap Gris Nez, the shortest crossing from England and are the most popular for passenger traffic. Calais is built on low ground with low sand dunes on either side and is enclosed by fortifications. There was a citadel in the old town surrounded by water and in 1940 on the east side, the moat was still wet but elsewhere had become a dry ditch. Surrounding the town was an enceinte, a defensive fortification, which originally consisted of twelve bastions linked by a curtain wall, with a perimeter of 8 mi (13 km), built by Vauban from 1667 to 1707.

In many places, the enceinte was overlooked by suburban buildings built in the nineteenth century. Two of the southern bastions and the wall linking them had been demolished to make way for railway lines, leading to railway sidings and quays of the Gare Maritime in the harbour. About 0.99 miles (1.6 km) outside the enceinte to the west was Fort Nieulay. Two other forts to the south and east were derelict or had disappeared. Outside the town, low ground to the east and south is cut by ditches, which limit the landward approach to roads raised above ground level. To the west and south-west, there is a ridge of higher ground between Calais and Boulogne, from which Calais is overlooked.

=== BEF ===
When plans for the deployment of the British Expeditionary Force (BEF) were made, the British Imperial General Staff drew from experience in the First World War. The British Expeditionary Force had used the Channel Ports as their entrepôts for supplies, even though they were only 32 km (20 mi) from the Western Front. Had the German spring offensive of 1918 succeeded in breaking through the front and capturing or even threatening the ports, the BEF would have been in a desperate position. During the Phoney War (September 1939 – 10 May 1940), the BEF had been supplied through ports further to the west, such as Le Havre and Cherbourg but the Channel Ports came into use, once mine barrages had been laid in the English Channel in late 1939, to reduce the demand for ships and escorts. When leave from the BEF began in December, Calais was used for communication and for troop movements, especially for men granted compassionate leave.

=== The Battle of France ===
On 10 May 1940, the Germans began Fall Gelb an offensive against France, Belgium and the Netherlands. Within a few days, Army Group A (Generaloberst Gerd von Rundstedt) broke through the French Ninth Army (General André Corap) in the centre of the French front near Sedan and drove westwards down the Somme river valley, led by Panzergruppe Kleist comprising XIX Armee Korps under Generalleutnant Heinz Guderian and the XLI Armee Korps (Generalleutnant Georg-Hans Reinhardt). On 20 May, the Germans captured Abbeville at the mouth of the Somme River, cutting off the Allied troops in Northern France and Belgium. The Battle of Arras, a Franco-British counter-attack on 21 May, led the Germans to continue to attack north towards the channel ports, rather than advance southwards over the Somme. Apprehension about another Franco-British counter-attack led to the "Arras halt order" being issued by the German higher commanders on 21 May. The neighbouring XV Korps (General Hermann Hoth) was held back in reserve and a division of the XLI Korps was moved eastwards, when the corps was only 31 miles (50 km) from Dunkirk.

== Prelude ==
=== German preparations ===
Map of the Côte d'Opale

Late on 21 May, Oberkommando des Heeres (OKH) rescinded the halt order; Panzergruppe Kleist was to resume the advance and move about 50 mi (80 km) north, to capture Boulogne and Calais. The next day, Guderian gave orders for the 2nd Panzer Division (Generalleutnant Rudolf Veiel) to advance to Boulogne on a line from Baincthun to Samer, with the 1st Panzer Division (Generallautnant Friedrich Kirchner) as a flank guard on the right, advancing to Desvres and Marquise in case of a counter-attack from Calais; the 1st Panzer Division reaching the vicinity of the port during the late afternoon. The 10th Panzer Division (Generalleutnant Ferdinand Schaal) was detached to guard against a possible counter-attack from the south. Parts of the 1st Panzer Division and 2nd Panzer Division were also held back to defend bridgeheads on the south bank of the Somme.

=== Allied preparations ===
Calais had been raided by Luftwaffe bombers several times, which caused disruption to military movements, confusion and traffic jams, with refugees making for Calais meeting refugees fleeing the port. The French army units in Calais were commanded by Commandant (Major) Raymond Le Tellier and the northernmost bastions and fortifications were manned by French naval reservists and volunteers commanded by the Commandant du Front de Mer (Capitaine de frégate Charles de Lambertye). Various army stragglers, including infantry and a machine-gun company had arrived in the town. On 19 May, Lieutenant-General Douglas Brownrigg, the Adjutant General of the BEF, appointed Colonel Rupert Holland to command the British troops in Calais and to arrange the evacuation of non-combatant personnel and wounded. The British contingent consisted of a platoon of the Argyll and Sutherland Highlanders (A&SH) who were guarding a radar site, the 2nd Anti-Aircraft Regiment RA, 58th (A&SH) Light Anti-Aircraft Regiment RA and the 1st Searchlight Regiment RA.

When the Germans captured Abbeville on 20 May, the War Office in Britain ordered troops to be despatched to the Channel Ports as a precaution. The 20th Guards Brigade was sent to Boulogne. The 3rd Royal Tank Regiment (3rd RTR, Lieutenant-Colonel R. Keller), the 1st Battalion Queen Victoria's Rifles (QVR, Lieutenant-Colonel J. A. M. Ellison-Macartney), the 229th Anti-Tank Battery RA and the new 30th Motor Brigade (Brigadier Claude Nicholson), were ordered to Calais. Most of the units dispatched to Calais were unprepared for action in some respects.

The 3rd RTR was part of the 1st Heavy Armoured Brigade (Brigadier John Crocker) and had been about to leave for Cherbourg, to join the 1st Armoured Division, which was assembling at Pacy-sur-Eure in Normandy. Their tanks had already been loaded aboard SS City of Christchurch in Southampton. Lieutenant-Colonel Keller received orders on the night of 21/22 May at Fordingbridge to move the 3rd RTR to Southampton but during the journey the personnel train was diverted to Dover. Keller was briefed at Dover to go to Calais and given sealed orders for the British port commander (although he was not told who this was). The personnel embarked aboard SS Maid of Orleans.

The QVR was a Territorial Army motor-cycle battalion, nominally the divisional cavalry for the 56th (London) Division. They had briefly been attached to the 30th Motor Brigade in April but then were returned to the 56th (London) Division for home defence, being deprived of their twenty-two scout cars. They were stationed near Ashford in Kent and late on 21 May, the QVR was ordered to proceed by train to Dover to embark for France; the motor-cycle combinations and other vehicles were to be left behind. After a confused move it was realised that there had been a staff error and that there was room for the motor-cycle combinations aboard the TSS Canterbury but they did not arrive before the ship sailed.

Maid of Orleans and City of Canterbury carrying the personnel of the 3rd RTR and the QVR departed Dover at 11:00 a.m. They arrived at Calais around 1:00 p.m., under a pall of smoke from buildings on fire in the town. The QVR landed without motorcycles, transport or 3-inch mortars and only smoke bombs for the 2-inch mortars. Many of the men were armed only with revolvers and had to scavenge for rifles from those dumped on the quay by personnel hastily departing for England.

While they waited for their vehicles to arrive, the men of the 3rd RTR were ordered to disperse in the sand dunes and were bombed soon after. Keller met Holland who told him to take orders from the BEF GHQ but at 5:00 p.m., Brownrigg arrived in Calais and ordered Keller to move the 3rd RTR south-west as soon as it had unloaded, to join the 20th Guards Brigade at Boulogne. After Brownrigg left, Major Ken Bailey turned up from GHQ with orders for the 3rd RTR to go to St Omer and Hazebrouck, 29 mi (47 km) east of Boulogne, to make contact with GHQ. Brownrigg had gone to Dover, unaware that his orders at Calais had been superseded. He met Nicholson and briefed him to relieve Boulogne with the 30th Infantry Brigade and the 3rd RTR.

SS City of Canterbury, with the 3rd RTR tanks, arrived from Southampton at 4:00 p.m. but unloading was very slow, as 7,000 imp gal (32,000 L) of petrol had been loaded on deck and had to be moved using only the ship's derricks, as a power cut had immobilised the cranes on the docks. A power cut and a strike by the ship's crew for 4 1/2 hours during the night of 22/23 May, added to the delay. The captain intended to leave the harbour without waiting, until he was held up at gunpoint by a 3rd RTR officer. The dock workers were exhausted, having been at work unloading rations for the BEF for many hours and it was not until the following morning that the vehicles had been unloaded and refuelled. The cruiser tanks had been loaded first and had to be unloaded last. More delay was caused by the tank guns having been coated in a preservative and loaded separately. The guns had to be cleaned before they could be remounted.

The 30th Motor Brigade had been formed on 24 April 1940, from the 1st Support Group, to take part in the Norwegian Campaign. After these orders were cancelled, the brigade was posted to East Anglia to meet a supposed threat of invasion. The main body of the brigade were the 1st Battalion, the Rifle Brigade (1st RB, Lieutenant Colonel Chandos Hoskyns) and the 2nd Battalion, King's Royal Rifle Corps (2nd KRRC, Lieutenant Colonel Euan Miller). These were both highly trained units, each about 750 strong. They were ordered late on 21 May to move by road to Southampton. They arrived on 22 May and were embarked in a rather chaotic fashion; the vehicles aboard SS Kohistan and SS City of Canterbury which proceeded directly to Calais, the KRRC aboard MV Royal Daffodil and the RB and brigade headquarters aboard SS Archangel. They sailed on 23 May, at first for Dover, where they were joined by an "Auto Carrier" containing the 229th Anti-Tank Battery RA, which had moved from Sheffield but had to leave four of the twelve anti-tank guns behind as there was no room for them on the ship. The 30th Brigade's personnel arrived at Calais in the afternoon of 23 May. They then had to wait, like the 3rd RTR, until the evening for the vehicle ships to arrive and be unloaded.

== Battle ==
=== 22 May ===
Authie river valley

The 3rd RTR had been assembling its 21 Light Tank Mk VI and 27 cruiser tanks at Coquelles on the Calais–Boulogne road according to the orders received from Brownrigg and a patrol of light tanks was sent down the St. Omer road according to the orders received from GHQ via Bailey. The patrol found the town empty, under bombardment and illuminated by the fires of burning buildings, at which the patrol returned to Coquelles at about 8:00 a.m. in the morning of 23 May. (The patrol was fortunate to miss the 6th Panzer Division, which had laagered around Guînes, west of the St. Omer road for the night.)

Calais was within the range of RAF aircraft based in Britain and at 6:00 a.m., Hawker Hurricanes of 151 Squadron shot down a Junkers Ju 88 bomber between Calais and Boulogne and Spitfires of 74 Squadron shot down another Ju 88, both from Lehrgeschwader 1 (LG 1). Fighters from 54 Squadron and 92 Squadron claimed five Messerschmitt Bf 109s of Jagdgeschwader 27 (JG 27, Fighter Wing 27) for one Spitfire during the morning and in the afternoon, 92 Squadron lost two Spitfires shot down to Messerschmitt Bf 110s of Zerstörergeschwader 26 (ZG 26) and Zerstörergeschwader 76 (ZG 76). From 21–22 May, LG 1 lost five aircraft over the Channel ports before II./Jagdgeschwader 2 was assigned to the group as escorts while JG 27 lost 10 Bf 109s. Six British fighters were lost. Sturzkampfgeschwader 77 (StG 77, Dive Bomber Wing 77) lost five on this date. No. 2 Group RAF flew support sorties in the area from 21 to 25 May, losing 13 bombers.

The German advance resumed in the morning and at 8:00 a.m. the panzers crossed the Authie. During the afternoon, French rearguards, with some parties of British and Belgian troops, were met at Desvres, Samer and the vicinity of Boulogne. The Allied air forces were active and made bombing and strafing attacks on the German forces, with little opposition from the Luftwaffe. The 10th Panzer Division was released from its defensive role and Guderian ordered the 1st Panzer Division, which was near Calais, to turn east towards Dunkirk and the 10th Panzer Division to move from Doullens to Samer and thence to Calais. (Note: The division had lost more than half its armoured vehicles and one third of its transport to battle casualties, mechanical breakdown and attacks by RAF bombers since the Battle of Stonne a week earlier and Schaal complained that his division was tired but was over-ruled.) The 1st Panzer Division was to advance eastwards to Gravelines at 10:00 a.m. the next day. The 10th Panzer Division advance was delayed around Amiens, because infantry units which were to relieve the division in the bridgehead on the south bank of the Somme, arrived late and the British reinforcements sent to Calais forestalled the Germans.

=== 23 May ===
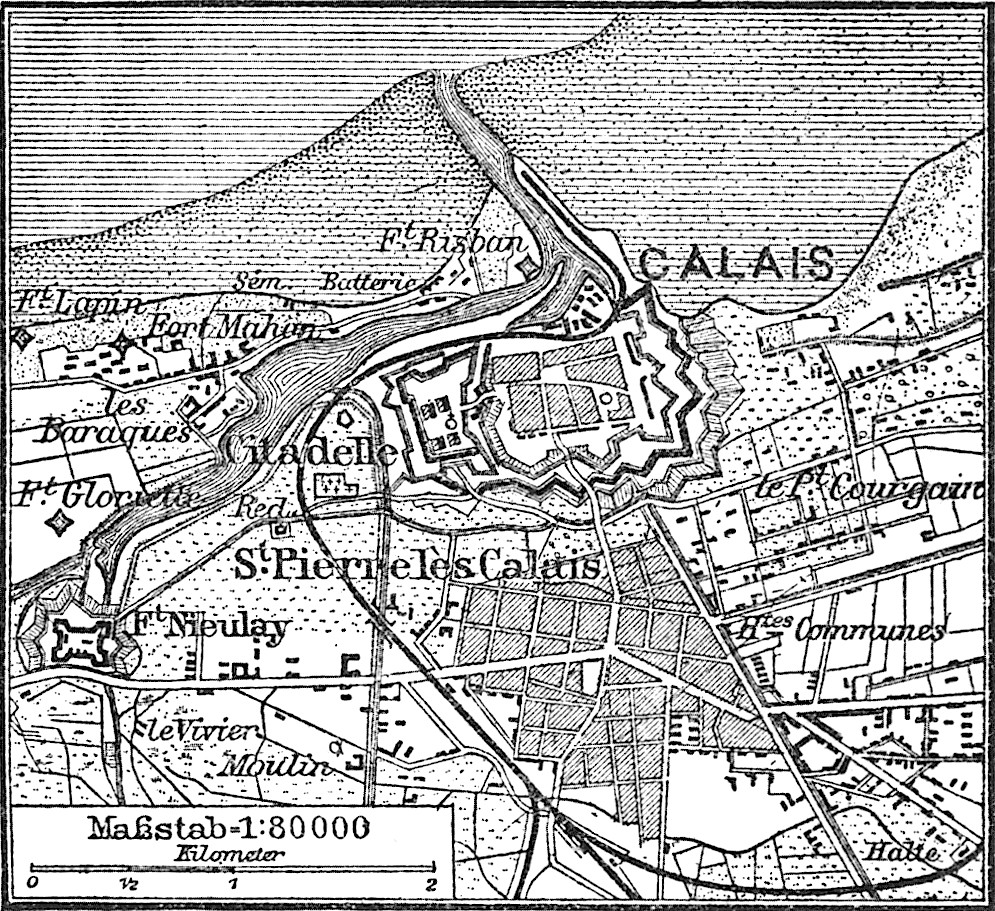
C19th map of Calais, showing coastal sands, fortifications and railway lines

On 23 May, the threat to the German flanks at Cambrai and Arras had been contained and Fliegerkorps VIII (Generaloberst Wolfram Freiherr von Richthofen) became available to support the 10th Panzer Division at Calais. Most of the Junkers Ju 87 Stuka dive-bombers were based around St Quentin, after leap-frogging forward in the wake of the advance but Calais was at the limit of their range. As units moved forward they had also come within the range of Fighter Command aircraft in England and Richthofen assigned I JG 27 (I Wing, Fighter Group 27) to Saint-Omer for fighter cover. Among the Geschwader (groups) flying in support of the 10th Panzer Division were StG 77, StG 1 (Oberstleutnant [Lieutenant-Colonel] Eberhard Baier), StG 2 (Geschwaderkommodore [Group Commander] Oskar Dinort) and the medium bombers of Kampfgeschwader 77 (KG 77, Oberst [Colonel] Dr. Johan-Volkmar Fisser).

The Luftwaffe units engaged RAF fighters and 92 Squadron shot down four Bf 109s; three I JG 27 pilots were taken prisoner, one was killed in action and 92 Squadron lost three Spitfires with their pilots. To reinforce the German fighters, I Jagdgeschwader 1, which was also based nearby to the south, was called on to escort Ju 87 units attacking Calais. Flying from forward airfields at Monchy-Breton, Hauptmann (Captain) Wilhelm Balthasar led JG 1 against the British Spitfires and claimed two of the four from his unit but lost one pilot killed.

The 3rd RTR received the report of the reconnaissance patrol and Bailey went back to GHQ with a light tank escort. Bailey became separated from the escort, ran into the advanced guard of the 1st Panzer Division at a crossroads on the St. Omer road and the driver was killed. The Germans were driven off by the men of a Royal Army Service Corps (RASC) petrol convoy, which had arrived on the scene. Bailey and the wounded passenger returned to Calais at about noon and told Keller that another attempt should be made, since the Germans had retired. Keller had already received information from the French that German tanks were moving towards Calais from Marquise. Despite doubts, Keller sent the rest of the 3rd RTR to follow the light tanks from Coquelles towards St. Omer at 2:15 p.m. When about 1 mi (1.6 km) south-east of Hames-Bources, the rearguard tanks and anti-tank guns of the 1st Panzer Division were spotted on the Pihen-les-Guînes road (guarding the rear of the division as the main body moved north-east towards Gravelines).

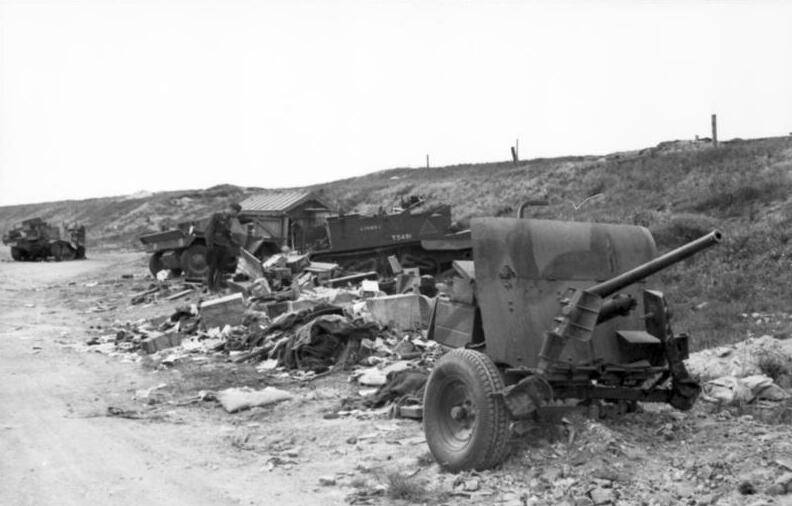
A destroyed British gun and Bren carrier on the side of a road outside Calais.

The 3rd RTR drove back German light tanks on the St. Omer road but despite losses, the heavier German tanks and anti-tank gun screen knocked out 7–12 British tanks, before Nicholson ordered the 3rd RTR back to Calais. Other units of the 1st Panzer Division moving on Gravelines met about fifty men of C Troop, 1st Searchlight Regiment at Les Attaques, about 3 mi (4.8 km) south-east of Bastion 6 in the Calais enceinte. C Troop had built a roadblock with a bus and a lorry, covered by Bren guns, rifles, and Boys anti-tank rifles and held out for about three hours before being overrun. German tank and infantry parties then attacked a post at Le Colombier 1 mi (1.6 km) further along the St.Omer–Calais road but were caught in crossfire from other posts and the guns of the 58th Light Anti-Aircraft Regiment on high ground near Boulogne. The Germans were repulsed until the post was withdrawn at 7:00 p.m. Calais was not the objective of the 1st Panzer Division but Oberst Kruger, commanding the battlegroup which was engaged at Guînes, Les Attaques and Le Colombier, had orders to take Calais from the south-east, if this could be achieved by a coup de main. As night fell the division reported that Calais was strongly held and broke off its attacks to resume the advance on Gravelines and Dunkirk.

Earlier, at 4:00 p.m. Schaal had ordered the main body of the 10th Panzer Division, consisting of the 90th Panzer Regiment (two tank battalions) and 86th Rifle Regiment (two infantry battalions) supported by a battalion of medium artillery, to advance up the main road from Marquise to the high ground around Coquelles, which would give them good observation over Calais. Meanwhile, on the right flank, a battlegroup based on the division's 69th Rifle Regiment (two infantry battalions) was to advance from Guînes to the centre of Calais.

When Nicholson had arrived in Calais in the afternoon with the 30th Infantry Brigade, he had discovered that the 3rd RTR had already been in action and had considerable losses, and that the Germans were closing on the port and had cut the routes to the south-east and south-west. Nicholson ordered the 1st RB to hold the outer ramparts on the east side of Calais and the 2nd KRRC to garrison the west side, behind the outposts of the QVR and the anti-aircraft units outside the town, which began a retirement to the enceinte from about 3:00 p.m. and continued during the night. Just after 4:00 p.m. Nicholson received an order from the War Office to escort a truck convoy carrying 350,000 rations to Dunkirk to the north-east, which was to supersede any other orders. Nicholson moved some troops from the defence perimeter to guard the Dunkirk road, while the convoy assembled but the 10th Panzer Division arrived from the south and began to bombard Calais from the high ground.

At 11:00 p.m. the 3rd RTR sent a patrol of a Cruiser Mk III (A13) and three light tanks to reconnoitre the convoy route, which ran into the 1st Panzer Division roadblocks covering the road to Gravelines. The tanks drove through the first barricade, then found many Germans beyond the third road block, who mistook the tanks for German, even when one of the tank commanders asked if they "Parlez-vous Anglais?" The British tanks drove on for about 2 mi (3.2 km), were inspected by torchlight and then stopped at a bridge over the Marck, to clear a string of mines which had been laid across the road. Two mines were blown up by 2-pounder fire and the rest dragged clear, the tanks then becoming fouled by coils of anti-tank wire, which took twenty minutes to cut free. The tanks then drove on and reached the British garrison at Gravelines but the radio in the A13 failed to transmit properly and Keller received only garbled fragments of messages, suggesting that the road was clear. A force of five tanks and a composite company of the Rifle Brigade led the truck convoy at 4:00 a.m. Near Marck, about 3 mi (4.8 km) east of Calais, they encountered a German road block which they outflanked but at daylight it was clear they would soon be surrounded and they withdrew to Calais.

=== 24 May ===
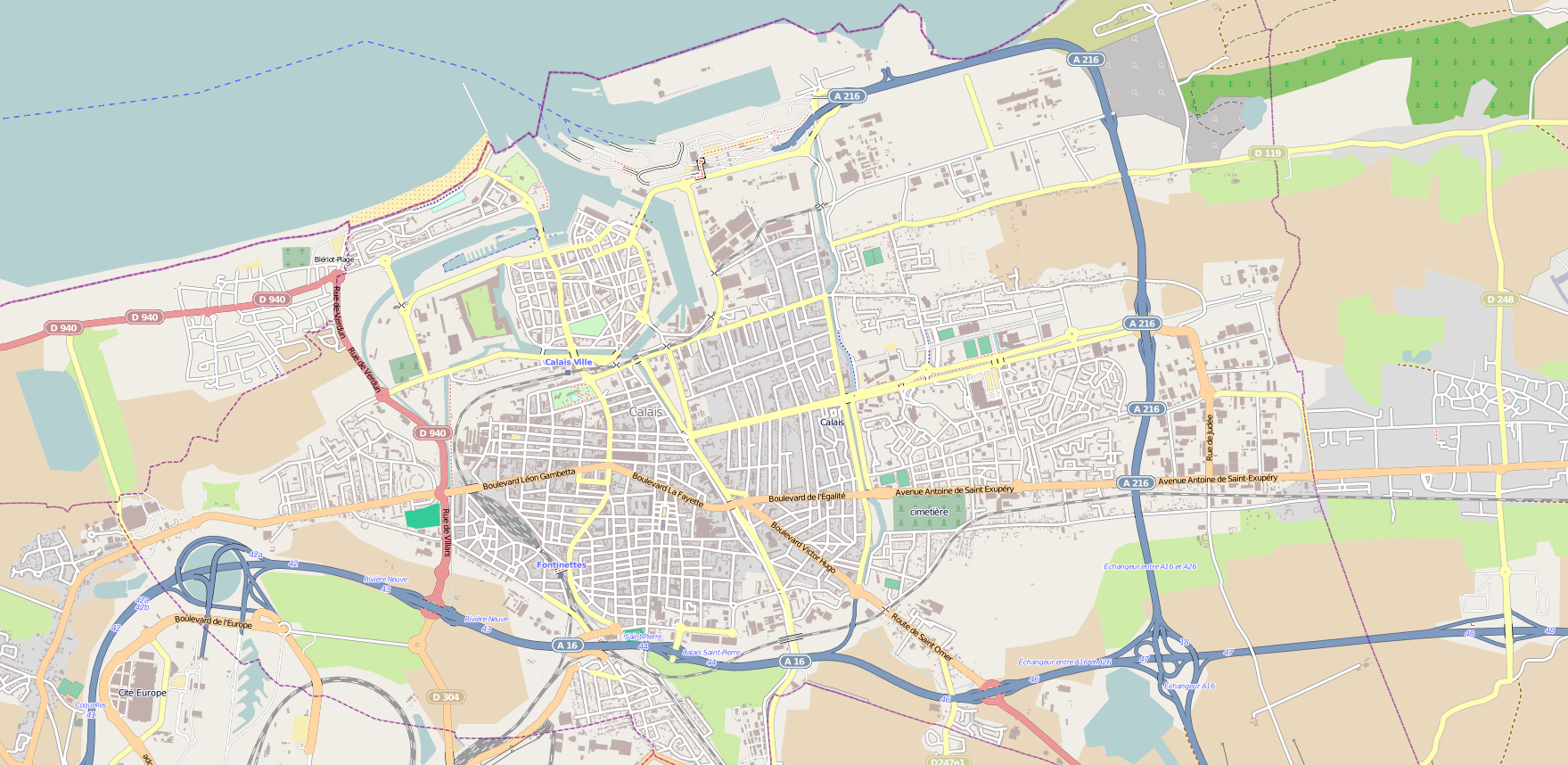
Modern map of Calais

At 4:45 a.m. the French coastal guns opened fire and German artillery and mortar fire began falling on the port at dawn, particularly on French gun positions, preparatory to an attack by the 10th Panzer Division against the west and south-west parts of the perimeter. The retirement of the QVR, searchlight and anti-aircraft troops from the outlying roadblocks had continued overnight until about 8:30 a.m., when the troops completed their withdrawal to the enceinte. Further west, B Company of the QVR was ordered back from Sangatte, about 5 mi (8.0 km) west of Calais at 10:00 a.m. and had retired slowly to the western face of the enceinte by 10:00 p.m. and a C Company platoon out on a road east of Calais, also stayed out until 10:00 p.m. but before midday, the main defensive line had been established on the enceinte. The first German attacks were repulsed except in the south, where the attackers penetrated the defences until forced back by a hasty counter-attack by the 2nd KRRC and tanks of the 3rd RTR. The German bombardment was extended to the harbour, where there was a hospital train full of wounded waiting to be evacuated. The harbour control staff ordered the wounded to be put aboard the ships, which were still being unloaded of equipment for the infantry battalions and rear echelon of the tank regiment. The dock workers and rear-area troops were also embarked and the ships returned to England, with some of the equipment still on board.

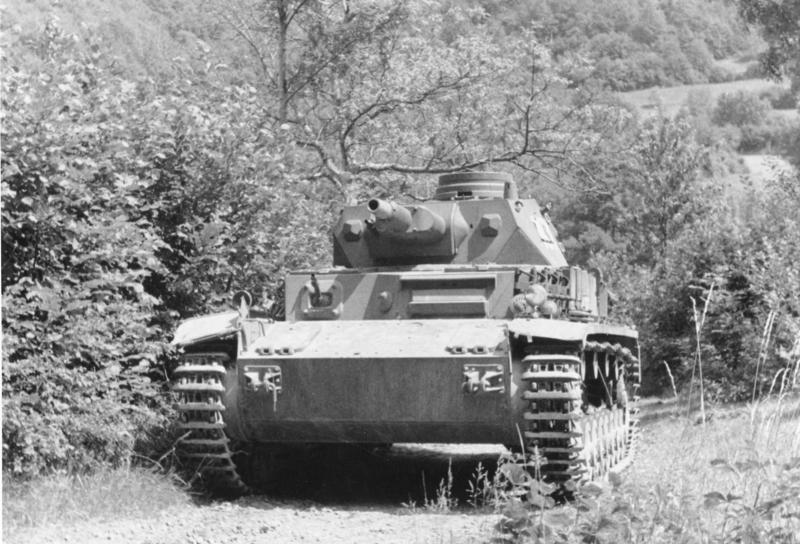
Panzer IV in France, 1940

During the afternoon the Germans attacked again on all three sides of the perimeter, with infantry supported by tanks. The French garrison of Fort Nieulay, outside the western ramparts surrendered after a bombardment. French marines in Fort Lapin and the coastal artillery emplacements spiked the guns and retreated. On the southern perimeter the Germans broke in again and could not be forced back, the defence being hampered by fifth columnists sniping from the town. The German troops who broke in began to fire in enfilade on the defenders from the houses they had captured. The defenders on the ramparts ran short of ammunition and the 229th Battery was reduced to two operational anti-tank guns. The Germans had great difficulty in identifying British defensive positions and by 4:00 a.m., had managed only a short advance. At 7:00 p.m. the 10th Panzer Division reported that a third of the equipment, vehicles and men were casualties, along with half of the tanks.

The Royal Navy had continued to deliver stores and take off wounded. The destroyers HMS Grafton, Greyhound, Wessex, Wolfhound, Verity and the Polish Okręt Rzeczypospolitej Polskiej (ORP) ORP Burza bombarded shore targets. The Ju 87 Stuka units made a maximum effort during the day, Wessex was sunk and Burza was damaged by StG 2 and StG 77 during a raid at 4:42 p.m. StG 2 were ordered to attack shipping; Dinort attacked Wessex but the destroyer made an elusive target and he missed after bombing on the second dive; the other two groups made a forty-strong formation which hit Wessex several times. The German crews had little training on anti-shipping operations but in the absence of British fighters, dived from 12,000 ft (3,700 m); as the Stukas departed they were attacked by Spitfires of 54 Squadron which shot down three of the dive-bombers and lost three Spitfires to the Bf 109 escorts. (Note: Foreman listed 13 claims for aircraft destroyed by 54 Squadron on 24 May and two damaged, all Bf 109s, though this might be a typographical error.)

Wolfhound put into Calais and the captain reported to the Admiralty that the Germans were in the southern part of town and that the situation was desperate. Nicholson had received a message from the War Office at 3:00 a.m. that Calais was to be evacuated and that once unloading was complete, non-combatants were to be embarked; at 6:00 p.m. Nicholson was told that the fighting troops would have to wait until 25 May. Lacking a reserve to counter-attack at the perimeter, Nicholson ordered a retirement to the Marck canal and Avenue Léon Gambetta; during the night, the defenders retreated to the Old Town and the area to the east, inside the outer ramparts and the Marck and Calais canals, while holding the north–south parts of the enceinte on both sides of the port. Le Tellier had set up the French headquarters in the Citadel on the west side of the Old Town but command of the French forces remained divided, with Lambertye still in charge of the naval artillery.

It had been arranged that French engineers would prepare the bridges over the canals for demolition but this had not occurred and the British had no explosives to do it themselves. Nicholson was informed by a signal at 11.23 p.m. from General Edmund Ironside the Chief of the Imperial General Staff (CIGS) that General Robert Fagalde, the French commander of the Channel Ports since 23 May, had forbidden an evacuation and that the Calais defenders must comply. As the harbour had lost its significance, Nicholson was to choose the best position from which to fight on; ammunition would be sent but no reinforcements. Nicholson was told that the 48th Division (Major-General Andrew Thorne) had begun to advance towards Calais to relieve the defenders. (Note: The 48th Division was never ordered to march on Calais, being used in the defence of Cassel and Hazebrouck near Dunkirk.) From 10:30–11:30 p.m. the French naval gunners spiked most of their guns and made their way to the docks to embark on French ships. Lambertye refused to go, despite being ill, and asked for volunteers from the 1,500 navy and army personnel to stay behind, about fifty men responding despite being warned that there would be no more rescue attempts. The volunteers took over Bastion 11 on the west side and held it for the duration of the siege.

=== 25 May ===
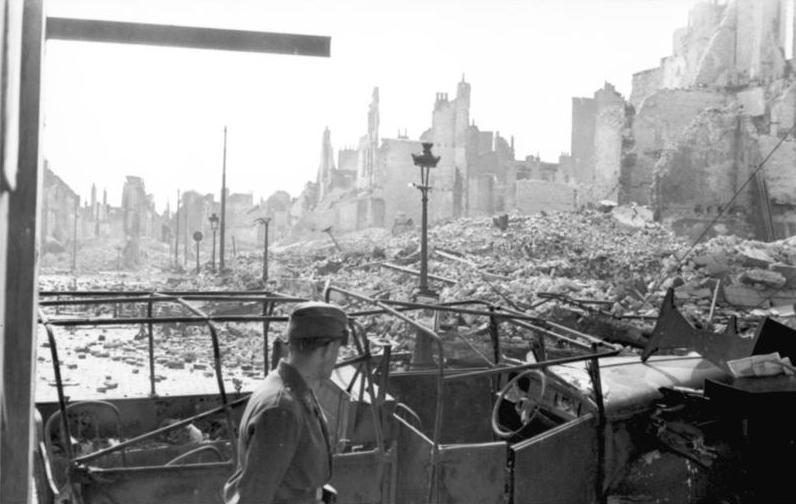
A German soldier in Calais stands next to a knocked-out vehicle with destroyed houses in the background.

During the night, Vice-Admiral James Somerville crossed from England and met Nicholson, who said that with more guns he could hold on for a while longer and they agreed that the ships in the port should return. At dawn on 25 May, the German bombardment resumed, concentrating on the old town, where buildings fell into streets, high winds fanned fires everywhere and smoke from explosions and the fires blocked the view. The last guns of the 229th Anti-Tank Battery were knocked out and only three tanks of the 3rd RTR remained operational. Distribution of rations and ammunition was difficult and after the water mains were broken, derelict wells were the only source. At 9:00 a.m. Schaal sent the mayor, André Gerschell, to ask Nicholson to surrender who refused. At noon, Schaal offered another opportunity to surrender and extended the 1:00 p.m. deadline to 3:30 p.m., when he found that his emissaries had been delayed, only to be refused again. (Note: Nicholson sent the reply "The answer is no, as it is the British Army's duty to fight as well as it is the German's") The German bombardment increased during the day, despite attempts by Allied ships to bombard German gun emplacements.

In the east, the 1st Rifle Brigade and parties of the QVR on the outer ramparts and the Marck and Calais canals repulsed a determined attack. The French then eavesdropped on a German wireless message, which disclosed that the Germans were going to attack the perimeter on the west side, held by the 2nd KRRC. At 1:00 p.m., Nicholson ordered a counter-attack and eleven Bren carriers and two tanks with the 1st RB were withdrawn and assembled for a sortie. The attackers were to depart from the enceinte north of the Bassin des Chasses de l'Ouest and rush round to the south to get behind the Germans. Hoskyns, the 1st RB commander objected, since the plan required the withdrawal of tanks and men from where the Germans were close to breaking through. Hoskyns was over-ruled and it took too long to contact Nicholson, because telephone and radio communication had been lost. The attack went ahead but the carriers bogged in the sand and the attempt failed. At about 3:30 p.m., the units holding the Canal de Marck were overwhelmed and Hoskyns was mortally wounded by a mortar bomb. Major A. W. Allan, the second-in-command of 1st RB, took over the battalion which then made a fighting withdrawal northwards through the streets, to the Bassin des Chasses, the Gare Maritime and the quays. In the south-east corner, at the 1st RB positions near the Quai de la Loire, a rearguard was surrounded and a counter-attack to extricate them was repulsed. Some of the rearguard broke out in a van driven by a fifth columnist at gunpoint but he stopped before reaching safety and few of the wounded reached cover. Only 30 men of the 150 in the area escaped.

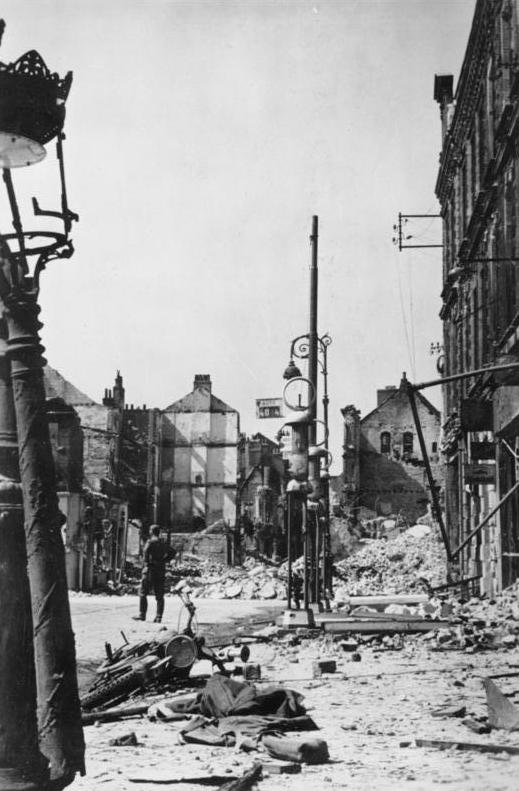
Damage inflicted on Calais by German artillery.

The units of the RB and QVR withdrawing from the northern part of the enceinte gained a respite when German artillery mistakenly shelled their own troops (II Battalion, Rifle Regiment 69) who were forming up in a small wood to the east of Bastion No. 2. In the afternoon, a German officer with a captured French officer and Belgian soldier, approached under a flag of truce to demand a surrender, which Nicholson refused. (Note: The 10th Panzer Division war diary recorded the reply: 1. The answer is no as it is the British Army's duty to fight as well as it is the German's. 2. The French captain and the Belgian soldier having not been blindfolded cannot be sent back. The Allied commander gives his word that they will be put under guard and will not be allowed to fight against the Germans.) The German attack was resumed and continued until the German commander decided that the defenders could not be defeated before dark. In the old town the KRRC and more parties of the QVR fought to defend the three bridges into the Old Town from the south but at 6:00 p.m. the German artillery ceased fire and tanks attacked the bridges. Three panzers attacked Pont Faidherbe and two were knocked out, the third tank retiring. At Pont Richelieu, the middle bridge, the first tank drove over a mine and the attack failed. At Pont Freycinet, near the Citadel, the attempt succeeded and the bridge was captured by tanks and infantry, who took cover in houses north of the bridge, until counter-attacked by the 2nd KRRC. Parties of French and British troops held a bastion, the French in the Citadel lost many men repulsing the attacks and Nicholson established a joint headquarters with the French.

Shortly after Hoskyns (commanding the 1st RB) was mortally wounded, Lieutenant Colonel Keller, commanding the 3rd RTR, decided that his few remaining tanks under shellfire near the Bastion de l'Estran, could no longer play a useful part in the defence. He ordered them to withdraw eastwards through the sand dunes north of the Bassin des Chasses while he himself tried to evacuate 100 wounded men from Bastion No. 1 to the sand dunes; the wounded were captured a short time later. Riding on a light tank, Keller later reached C Company of the 1st RB north-east of the bassin, where he suggested that they and his tanks withdraw to Dunkirk but his last tanks broke down or ran out of fuel and were destroyed by their crews. At nightfall Keller and some of the crews made their way on foot to Gravelines. Keller and one of his squadron commanders were able to cross the Aa River; next morning they contacted French troops and were later evacuated to Dover.

At 10:30 a.m. GMT, 17 Squadron claimed three Stukas destroyed over Calais and three damaged, plus a Do 17. Air cover was maintained by 605 Squadron, which claimed four Ju 87s and a Hs 126 destroyed with another five unconfirmed claims, after an engagement at 5:54 p.m. while escorting Bristol Blenheim on a reconnaissance sortie. The formation of 40 to 50 Stukas attacked shipping near the port. 264 Squadron flew escort operations in the afternoon without incident. On 25 May, 11 Group flew 25 Blenheim bomber and 151 fighter sorties, losing two Blenheims and two fighters, against 25 Luftwaffe aircraft shot down and nine damaged to all causes. RAF Bomber Command flew 139 sorties against land targets on 25 May. StG 2 lost four Ju 87s and one damaged. All eight of the crews shot down were captured but released after the French surrender.

=== 26 May ===
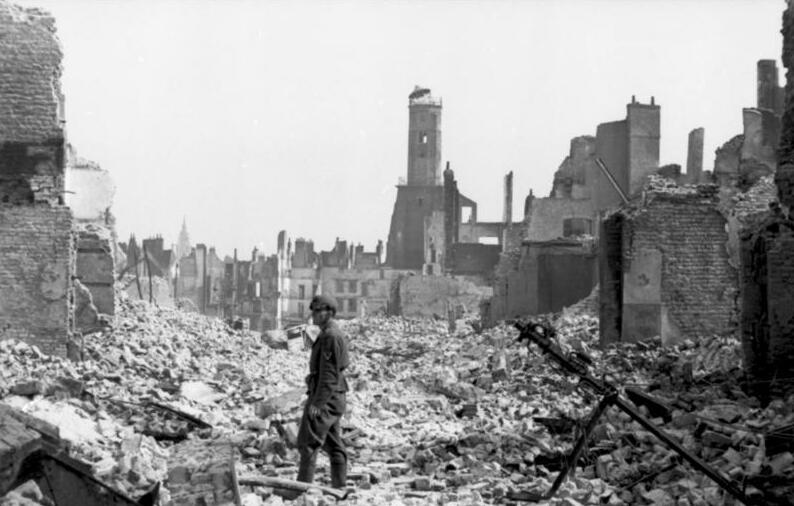
German soldier amidst the ruins of Calais.

In case Fagalde relented, fifteen small naval vessels towing boats, with room for about 1,800 men waited offshore, some sailed into Calais harbour without an evacuation order and one vessel delivered another order for Nicholson to continue the battle. At 8:00 a.m. Nicholson reported to England that the men were exhausted, the last tanks had been knocked out, water was short and reinforcement probably futile, the Germans had got into the north end of town. The resistance of the Calais garrison had led the German staff to meet late on 25 May, when Colonel Walther Nehring, the XIX Armee Korps Chief of Staff, suggested to Schaal that the final attack should be postponed until 27 May, when more Stukas would be available. Schaal preferred to attack, rather than give the British time to send reinforcements.

At 5:00 a.m., the German artillery resumed its bombardment. Several artillery units had been brought up from Boulogne, doubling the numbers of guns available to Schaal. From 8:30–9:00 a.m., the old town and citadel were attacked by artillery and up to 100 Stukas, after which the infantry attacked, while the German guns and StG 77 and StG 2 subjected the Citadel to heavy assaults for another thirty minutes. The 2nd KRRC continued to resist the German infantry attacks at the canal bridges. Schaal was told that if the port had not been surrendered by 2:00 p.m., the division would be ordered back until the Luftwaffe had levelled the town. The Germans began to break through around 1:30 p.m., when Bastion 11 was captured after the French volunteers ran out of ammunition. On the other side of the harbour, the 1st RB held positions around the Gare Maritime, under attack from the south and east. Major Allan, in command, held on in the belief that the 2nd KRRC might withdraw north-east to the Place de Europe to make a joint final defence of the harbour. At 2:30 p.m. the Germans finally overran the Gare Maritime and the Bastion de l'Estran. The survivors of the 1st RB made a last stand on and around Bastion No. 1, before being overwhelmed at 3:30 p.m.

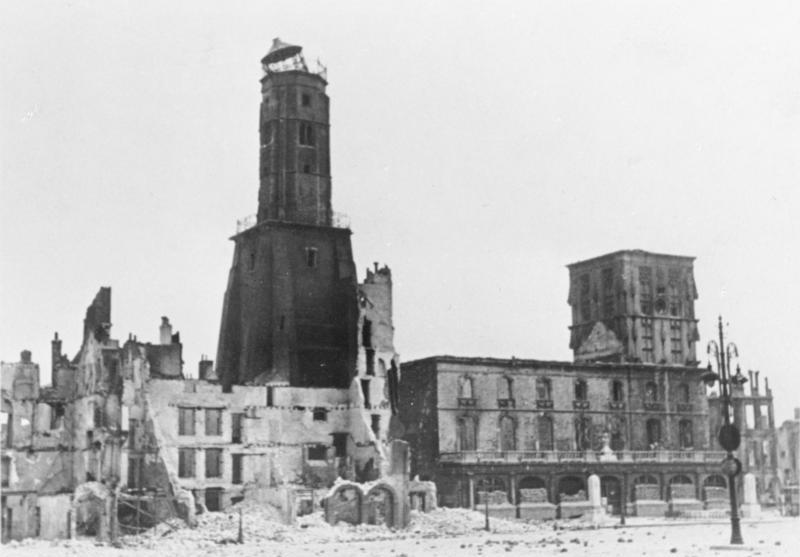
A church and houses in Calais, demolished by Stukas.

The 2nd KRRC retreated from the three bridges between the old and new towns, to a line from the harbour to the cathedral between Rue Notre Dame and Rue Maréchaux, 600 yd (549 m) from one of the bridges. Troops in the Citadel began to show white flags. German tanks crossed Pont Freycinet and British troops dispersed, having no weapons to engage tanks. At 4:00 p.m. the new line collapsed and the 2nd KRRC was given the order "every man for himself", after which only B Company fought as a unit, not having received orders to retreat to the harbour. The occupants of the Citadel realised that the German artillery had ceased fire and found themselves surrounded around 3:00 p.m.; a French officer arrived, with news that Le Tellier had surrendered.

During the day, the RAF flew 200 sorties near Calais, with six fighter losses from 17 Squadron, which attacked Stuka dive-bombers of StG 2, claimed three, a Dornier Do 17 and a Henschel Hs 126. Fleet Air Arm (FAA) Fairey Swordfish aircraft, bombed German troops near Calais and the escorts from 54 Squadron claimed three Bf 110s and a Bf 109, for the loss of three aircraft. At noon 605 Squadron claimed four Stukas from StG 77 and a Hs 126 for a loss of a Hurricane. JG 2 protected the Ju 87s, fought off the attacks from 17 Squadron and there appear to have been no German losses, while they shot down Blenheim on a reconnaissance sortie. I Jagdgeschwader 3 were able to conduct fighter sweeps over Calais after noon, with the battle almost over. Seven Bf 109s engaged a flight of Hurricanes, the dogfight extending over Calais; one Hurricane was shot down for no loss to JG 3.

== Aftermath ==
=== Analysis ===
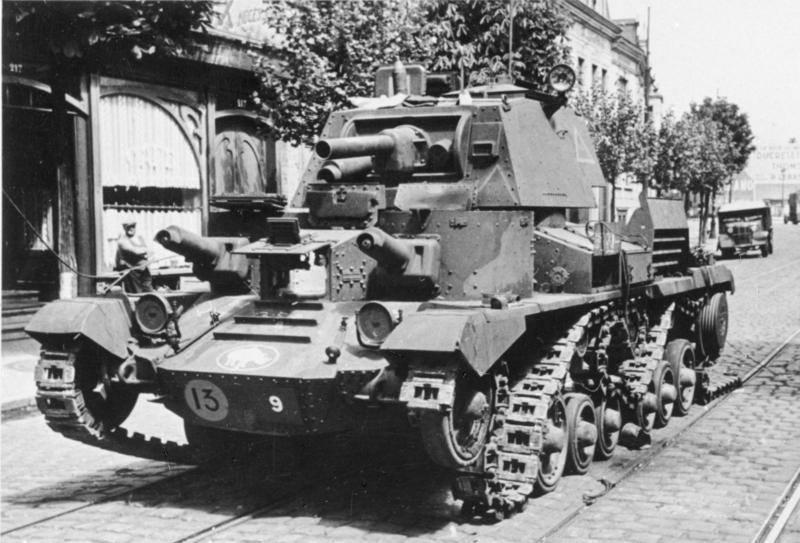
A damaged Cruiser Mk I CS abandoned in Calais, 1940.

In 2006, Sebag-Montefiore wrote that the defence of the advanced posts outside Calais, by inexperienced British troops against larger numbers of German troops, may have deterred the 1st Panzer Division commanders from probing the Calais defences further and capturing the port. In the early afternoon of 23 May, it was unlikely that the British troops on the Calais enceinte were prepared to receive an attack, the 2nd KRRC and 1st RB having disembarked only an hour earlier at 1:00 p.m. The unloading of the 2nd KRRC vehicles was delayed until 5:00 p.m. and half of the battalion did not arrive at its positions until 6–6:30 p.m. An attack on Calais in the early afternoon would only have met the QVR.

The day after Calais surrendered, the first British personnel were evacuated from Dunkirk. In Erinnerungen eines Soldaten (1950, English edition 1952), Guderian replied to a passage in Their Finest Hour (1949) by Winston Churchill, that Hitler had ordered the panzers to stop outside Dunkirk in the hope that the British would make peace overtures. Guderian denied this and wrote that the defence of Calais was heroic but made no difference to the course of events at Dunkirk. In 1966, Lionel Ellis, the British official historian, wrote that the defence of Calais and Boulogne diverted three panzer divisions from the French First Army and the BEF; by the time that the Germans had captured the ports and reorganised, III Corps (Lieutenant-General Ronald Adam) had moved west and blocked the routes to Dunkirk.

In 2005, Karl-Heinz Frieser wrote that the Franco-British counter-attack at Arras on 21 May, had a disproportionate effect on the Germans, because the German higher commanders were apprehensive about flank security. Ewald von Kleist, the commander of Panzergruppe Kleist perceived a "serious threat" and informed Colonel-General Franz Halder (Chief of the General Staff of OKH), that he had to wait until the crisis was resolved before continuing. Colonel-General Günther von Kluge, the 4th Army commander, ordered the tanks to halt, an order supported by Rundstedt, the commander of Army Group A. On 22 May, when the Anglo-French attack had been repulsed, Rundstedt ordered that the situation at Arras must be restored before Panzergruppe Kleist moved on Boulogne and Calais. At Oberkommando der Wehrmacht (OKW, High Command of the Armed Forces) the panic was worse and Hitler contacted Army Group A on 22 May, to order all mobile units to operate either side of Arras and further west; infantry units were to operate to the east of the town.

The crisis among the higher staffs of the German army was not apparent at the front and Halder formed the same conclusion as Guderian, the real threat was that the Allies would retreat to the channel coast and a race for the channel ports began. Guderian had ordered the 2nd Panzer Division to capture Boulogne, the 1st Panzer Division to take Calais and the 10th Panzer Division to seize Dunkirk, before the halt order. Most of the BEF and the French First Army were still 62 miles (100 km) from the coast but despite delays, British troops were sent from England to Boulogne and Calais just in time to forestall the XIX Corps panzer divisions on 22 May. Had the panzers advanced at the same speed on 21 May as they had on 20 May, before the halt order stopped their advance for 24 hours, Boulogne and Calais would have fallen easily. (Without a halt at Montcornet on 15 May and the second halt on 21 May, after the Battle of Arras, the final halt order of 24 May would have been irrelevant, because Dunkirk would have already fallen to the 10th Panzer Division.)

=== Casualties ===
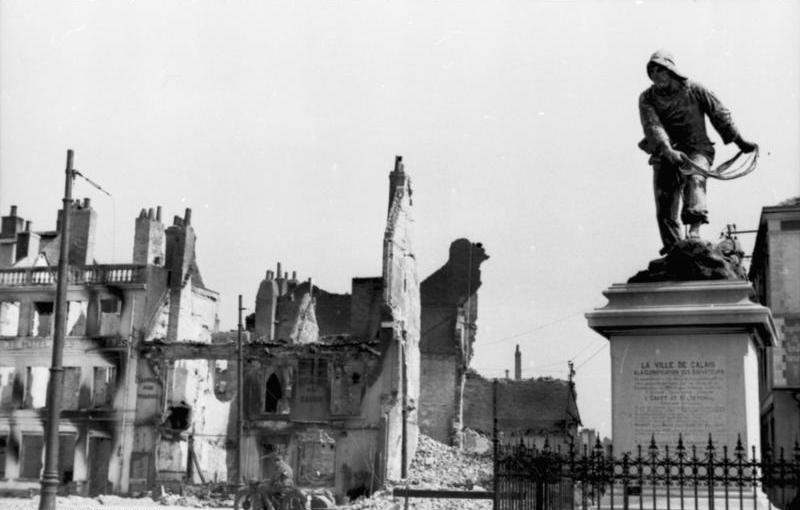
Calais in ruins after the siege

In 1952, Guderian wrote that the British surrendered at 4:45 p.m. and that 20,000 prisoners were taken, including 3,000–4,000 British troops, the remainder being French, Belgian and Dutch, most of whom had been "locked in cellars by the British" after they had ceased to fight. In 2006, Sebag-Montefiore wrote that German casualties killed and wounded during the battle were not recorded but probably amounted to several hundred. Brigadier Nicholson was never able to give his views as he died in captivity on 26 June 1943 aged 44. Lieutenant-Colonel Chandos Hoskyns, commanding the Rifle Brigade, was mortally wounded on 25 June and died in England. Capitaine de frégate Charles de Lambertye, commanding the French contingent, died of a heart attack while touring the defences of Calais on 26 May. (Note: Airey Neave was a troop commander in the 1st Searchlight Regiment, Royal Artillery when he was taken prisoner.) German situation reports recorded 160 aircraft lost or damaged from 22 to 26 May; the RAF lost 112 aircraft.

=== Subsequent operations ===
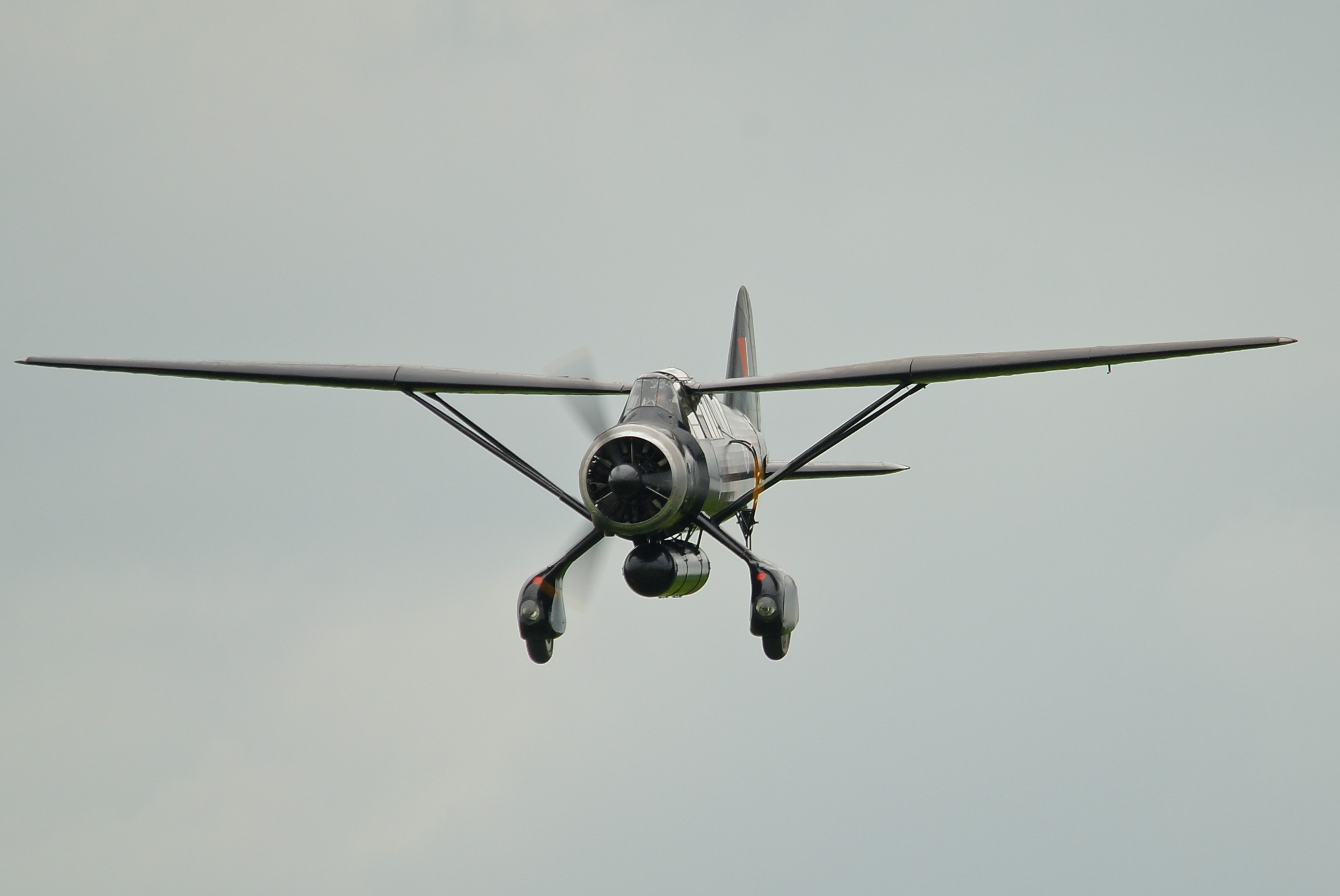
Westland Lysander flying in 2013

When the evacuation of troops was stopped, the Vice-Admiral Dover, Vice-Admiral Bertram Ramsay sent smaller craft to remove surplus men and the launch Samois made four journeys to take wounded back to England. The yacht HMY Conidaw entered the harbour on 26 May and ran aground. The yacht was refloated on the afternoon tide and brought away 165 men, as other vessels took on more casualties. During the night of 26/27 May Ramsay had the motor yacht HMY Gulzar painted with red crosses and sailed to Calais to recover wounded. At 2:00 a.m., Gulzar entered the harbour and docked at the Gare Maritime pier; a party went ashore and was fired on.

The party ran back and the boat cast off, as Gulzar was fired on from around the harbour. British troops on the eastern jetty called out and shone torches, which were seen by the crew; Gulzar turned back, the fugitives jumped aboard as the yacht was still under fire and escaped. On 27 May, the RAF responded to a War Office request the evening before, to drop supplies to the Calais garrison and sent twelve Westland Lysander aircraft to drop water at dawn. At 10:00 a.m. 17 Lysanders dropped ammunition on the Citadel, as nine Swordfish of the FAA bombed German artillery emplacements. Three Lysanders were shot down and a Hawker Hector was damaged.

== Commemoration ==
Calais 1940 was awarded as a battle honour to the British units in action.

== Orders of battle ==
Data from Routledge (1994) Farndale (1996) and Ellis (2004) unless indicated.

XIX Corps

- Panzergruppe Kleist (General of Cavalry Ewald von Kleist, Chief of Staff: Brigadier-General Kurt Zeitzler)
- XIX Korps (General of Cavalry Heinz Guderian)
  - 1st Panzer Division (Major-General Friedrich Kirchner)
  - 2nd Panzer Division (Major-General Rudolf Veiel)
  - 10th Panzer Division (Major-General Ferdinand Schaal)
- XLI korps (Major-General Georg-Hans Reinhardt)
  - 6th Panzer Division (Brigadier-General Werner Kempf)
  - 8th Panzer Division (Colonel Erich Brandenberger)

Calais garrison

- 30th Motor Brigade (Brigadier C. N. Nicholson)
  - 1st Battalion, Rifle Brigade (Prince Consort's Own)
  - 2nd Battalion, King's Royal Rifle Corps
  - 7th Battalion, King's Royal Rifle Corps (1st Battalion, Queen Victoria's Rifles)
  - 3rd Royal Tank Regiment (under command)
  - 229th Anti-Tank Battery (less a troop) 58th Anti-Tank Regiment, RA (under command)
  - 6th Heavy Anti-Aircraft Battery, 2nd Heavy Anti-Aircraft Regiment, RA (under command)
  - 172nd Light Anti-Aircraft Battery, 58th (Argyll and Sutherland Highlanders) Light Anti-Aircraft Regiment, RA (under command)
  - 1st and 2nd Searchlight Batteries, 1st Searchlight Regiment, RA (under command)
  - Elements, 2nd Searchlight Regiment, RA

== See also ==
- List of British military equipment of World War II
- List of French military equipment of World War II
- List of German military equipment of World War II
