= 30th Infantry Brigade (United Kingdom) =

Infantry brigade of the British Army

The 30th Infantry Brigade was an infantry brigade of the British Army in the First and Second World Wars.

== History ==
=== First World War ===
The Brigade was formed at Curragh Camp, Ireland, in August 1914 as part of the 10th (Irish) Division. It originally comprised the 6th and 7th (service) battalions of the Royal Munster Fusiliers and the 6th and 7th (service) battalions of the Royal Dublin Fusiliers. The brigade served with the 10th (Irish) Division throughout the First World War.

=== Second World War ===
The brigade was reformed on 24 April 1940 in the United Kingdom, as the 30th Infantry Brigade, commanded by Brigadier Claude Nicholson. It contained two regular army motor infantry battalions and a Territorial motorcycle reconnaissance battalion. It was intended to be part of the 1st Armoured Division, then forming in Normandy, but on 22 May it was hastily sent to Calais in France to defend the port against a German panzer division. After a siege there, lasting three days, the brigade was overrun late on 26 May.

The brigade was reformed again on 17 October 1940 as the 30th Independent Brigade Group (Guards), and later converted to the 6th Guards Tank Brigade.

==== Order of battle ====
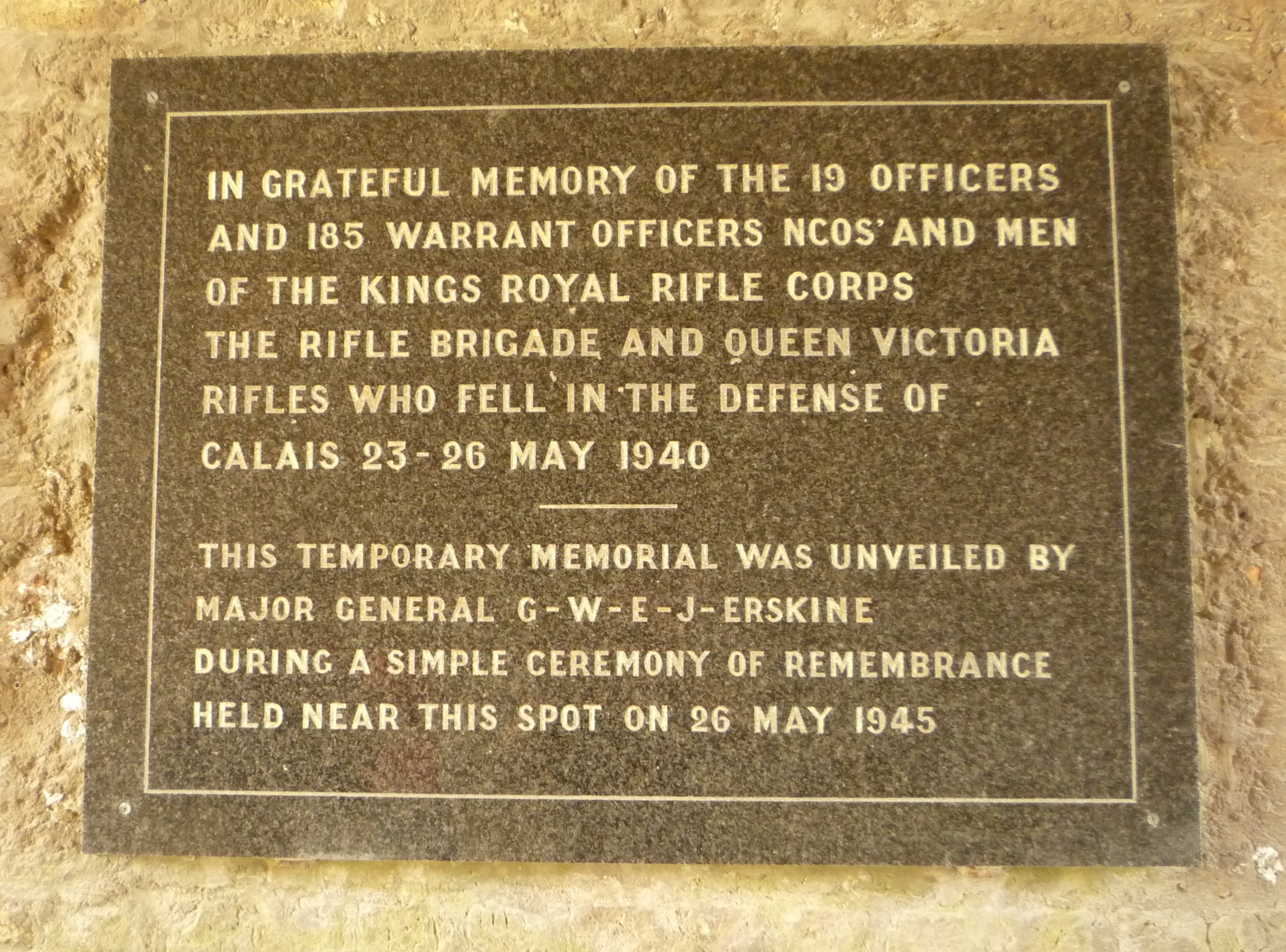
30 Brigade memorial plaque inside the gatehouse of Calais Citadel, scene of the epic defence in May 1940.

(At Calais)

- 1st Battalion, Rifle Brigade (Prince Consort's Own)
- 2nd Battalion, King's Royal Rifle Corps
- 7th Battalion, King's Royal Rifle Corps (1st Battalion, Queen Victoria's Rifles)
- 3rd Royal Tank Regiment (under command)
- 229th Anti-Tank Battery, Royal Artillery (under command)

(As 6th Guards Tank Brigade)

- 4th Battalion, Coldstream Guards
- 3rd Battalion, Scots Guards
- 4th Battalion, Grenadier Guards
