= Ronald Cooke (British Army officer) =

British Army general

Major-General Ronald Cooke CB CBE DSO
- Born: 1 September 1899
- Died: 26 March 1971 (aged 71)
- Military career
- Allegiance: United Kingdom
- Branch: British Army
- Service years: 1918−1955
- Rank: Major-General
- Service number: 403
- Unit: 17th Lancers
- Commands: East Riding of Yorkshire Yeomanry; 9th Independent Armoured Brigade; 8th Armoured Brigade; 49th (West Riding) Armoured Division
- Conflicts: First World War; Second World War
- Awards: Companion of the Order of the Bath; Commander of the Order of the British Empire; Distinguished Service Order

Major-General Ronald Basil Bowen Bancroft Cooke, CB, CBE, DSO (1 September 1899 – 26 March 1971) was a British Army officer.

== Military career ==
Cooke was commissioned into the 17th Lancers on 21 August 1918 during the First World War. He served in the Second World War as commanding officer of the East Riding of Yorkshire Yeomanry from 1940, as Brigadier Royal Armoured Corps for the 1st Army from 1942 and as Brigadier on the General Staff of X Corps in 1943 before becoming commander of the 9th Independent Armoured Brigade in Italy from October 1944 during the Italian campaign.

After the war he became Chief of Staff at the Allied Control Commission in Austria in 1946, commander of 8th Armoured Brigade in August 1947 and General Officer Commanding 49th (West Riding) Armoured Division in December 1948. His last appointment was as Director of Royal Armoured Corps at the War Office in August 1952 before retiring in August 1955.

After leaving the army he became Director of Civil Defence for Wales and then, from 1960, Commandant of the Civil Defence College at Sunningdale Park.

Military offices
| Preceded by George Richards | GOC 49th (West Riding) Armoured Division; 1948–1951 | Succeeded by Reginald Harding |
