= Temple Gurdon (British Army officer) =

British Army general (1896–1959)

Major-General Temple Gurdon CB CBE MC
- Born: 20 October 1896; Middlesex, England
- Died: 15 December 1959 (aged 63)
- Military career
- Allegiance: United Kingdom
- Branch: British Army
- Service years: 1914–1948
- Rank: Major-General
- Service number: 8822
- Units: East Yorkshire Regiment; Rifle Brigade (The Prince Consort's Own); Black Watch
- Commands: 1st Battalion, Black Watch; 25th Infantry Brigade; 49th (West Riding) Infantry Division; Salisbury Plain District
- Conflicts: First World War; Second World War
- Awards: Companion of the Order of the Bath; Commander of the Order of the British Empire; Military Cross; Mentioned in dispatches

Major-General Edward Temple Leigh Gurdon, CB, CBE, MC (20 October 1896 – 15 December 1959) was a British Army officer.

== Military career ==
After being educated at Rugby School, Gurdon, the son of a bishop, entered the Royal Military College at Sandhurst, from where he was commissioned into the East Yorkshire Regiment in 1914 but transferred to the Rifle Brigade (The Prince Consort's Own) on 12 May 1915, during the First World War. His service in the war was mainly in the East African campaign and he ended the war in 1918 having been mentioned in dispatches and awarded the Military Cross (MC), the citation for which reads:

For conspicuous gallantry in action. When all his senior officers became casualties he took command of the battalion, and showed great ability, coolness and courage throughout the day.

He remained in the army during the difficult interwar period and was made Private Secretary to Robert Coryndon, then the Governor of Uganda, from 1919−1920. He transferred to the Black Watch in 1922 and was married in 1923. He attended the Staff College, Camberley from 1929−1930 and returned there, this time as an instructor, a few years later.

He served in the Second World War as commanding officer of the 1st Battalion, the Black Watch from 1940, as commander of the 25th Infantry Brigade from January 1941 and as Brigadier on the General Staff at Eastern Command in India in August 1942 before becoming Director of Military Training at Army Headquarters, India in April 1943.

After the war he became General Officer Commanding (GOC) the 49th (West Riding) Infantry Division in September 1945 and General Officer Commanding, Salisbury Plain District in January 1947 before retiring in October 1948.

== Bibliography ==
- Smart, Nick (2005). Biographical Dictionary of British Generals of the Second World War. Barnsley, South Yorkshire: Pen and Sword Books. ISBN 1844150496.

Military offices
Preceded by Stuart Rawlins	GOC 49th (West Riding) Infantry Division; 1945–1947	Succeeded by George Richards
